= Hochberg (Haardt) =

Mountain in Germany

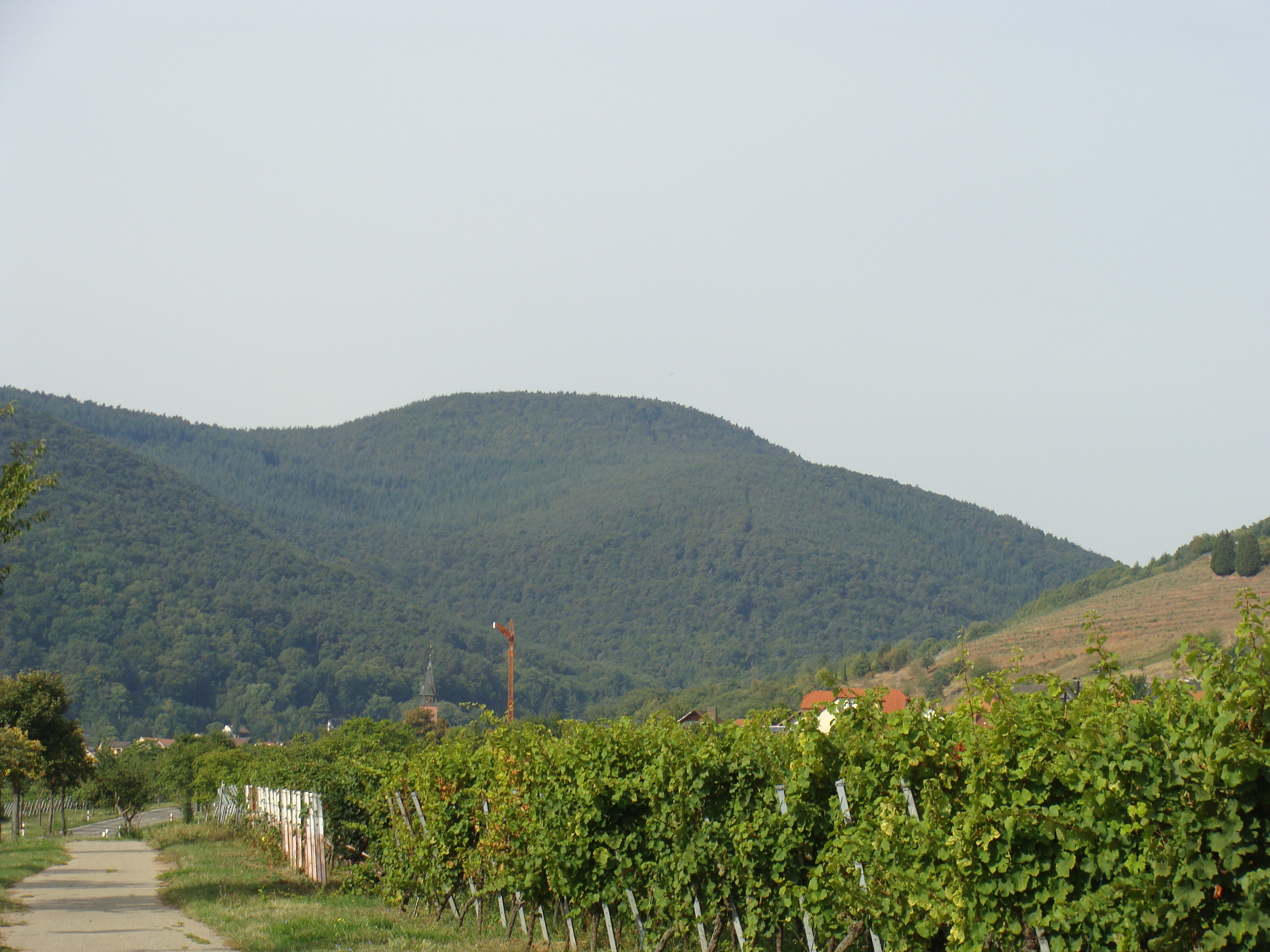

Highest point
- Elevation: 635.3 m above sea level (NN) (2,084 ft)
- Coordinates: 49°17′59″N 8°04′19″E

Geography
- Location within Rhineland-Palatinate
- Location: Palatine Forest, Rhineland-Palatinate, Germany
- Parent range: Haardt

The Hochberg (German pronunciation: [ˈhoːxˌbɛʁk]) is a 635.3-metre-high mountain in the central Haardt in the Palatine Forest in Germany. It lies on the territory of the municipality of Sankt Martin (Palatinate) in the county of Südliche Weinstraße in the state of Rhineland-Palatinate. After the Kalmit (673 m), the Kesselberg (662 m) and the Roßberg (637 m) it is the fourth highest peak in the Palatine Forest.

== Location ==
The mountain lies south of two other mountains, the Breitenberg and the Hüttenberg, that are also part of the Kalmit massif and are located between the valleys of St. Martiner Tal in the north and Edenkobener Tal in the south. In addition to the main summit there is also a subpeak to the southeast, the Straußenberg (583 m). To the east the massif drops down to the Rhine Plain, its foothills including the Kropsburg (334 m), the Heidelberg (338 m) and the Werderberg (350 m) with its peace monument. To the west of the mountain is the Schafkopf (617 m), with which it is linked via a saddle by the St. Martiner Hut (486 m). On the tree-covered summit there is a stone cairn, the Steinernes Köppl. Not far from the summit is a rock outcrop, the Schornsteinfelsen, from which it is possible to see the Rhine Plain.

== Natural region ==
The Hochberg is part of the natural region of the Palatine Forest that, in the system by Emil Meynen and Josef Schmithüsen published in the Handbuch der naturräumlichen Gliederung Deutschland and its successor publications is classified as a major region of the 3rd order. Within the mountain range itself, it belongs to the Central Palatine Forest.

== Access and footpaths ==
The mountain summit may be climbed on signed hiking trails from the Kropsburg to the east or from the Wegspinne by the St. Martiner Hut to the west.

== Gallery ==
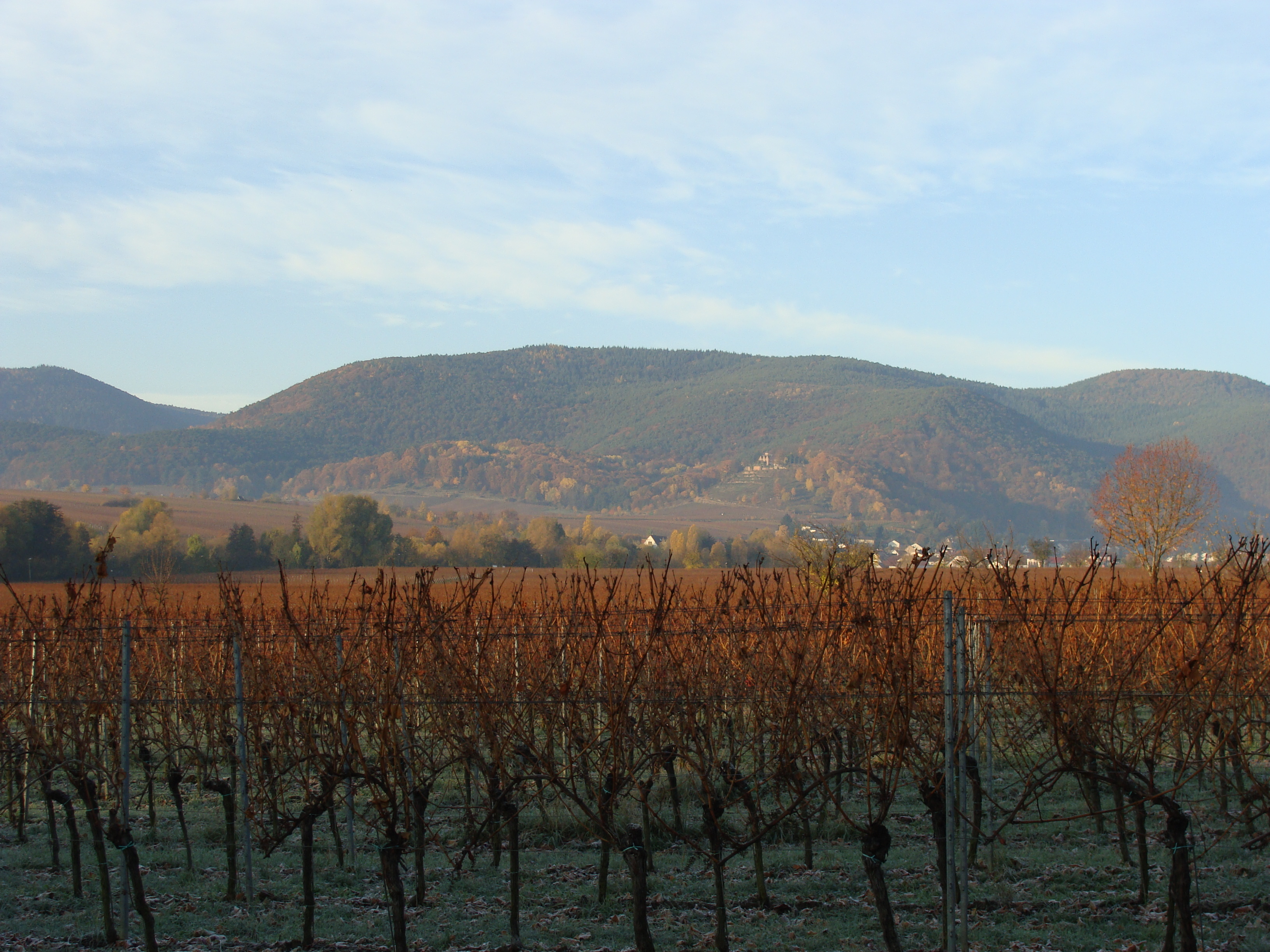
Straußenberg

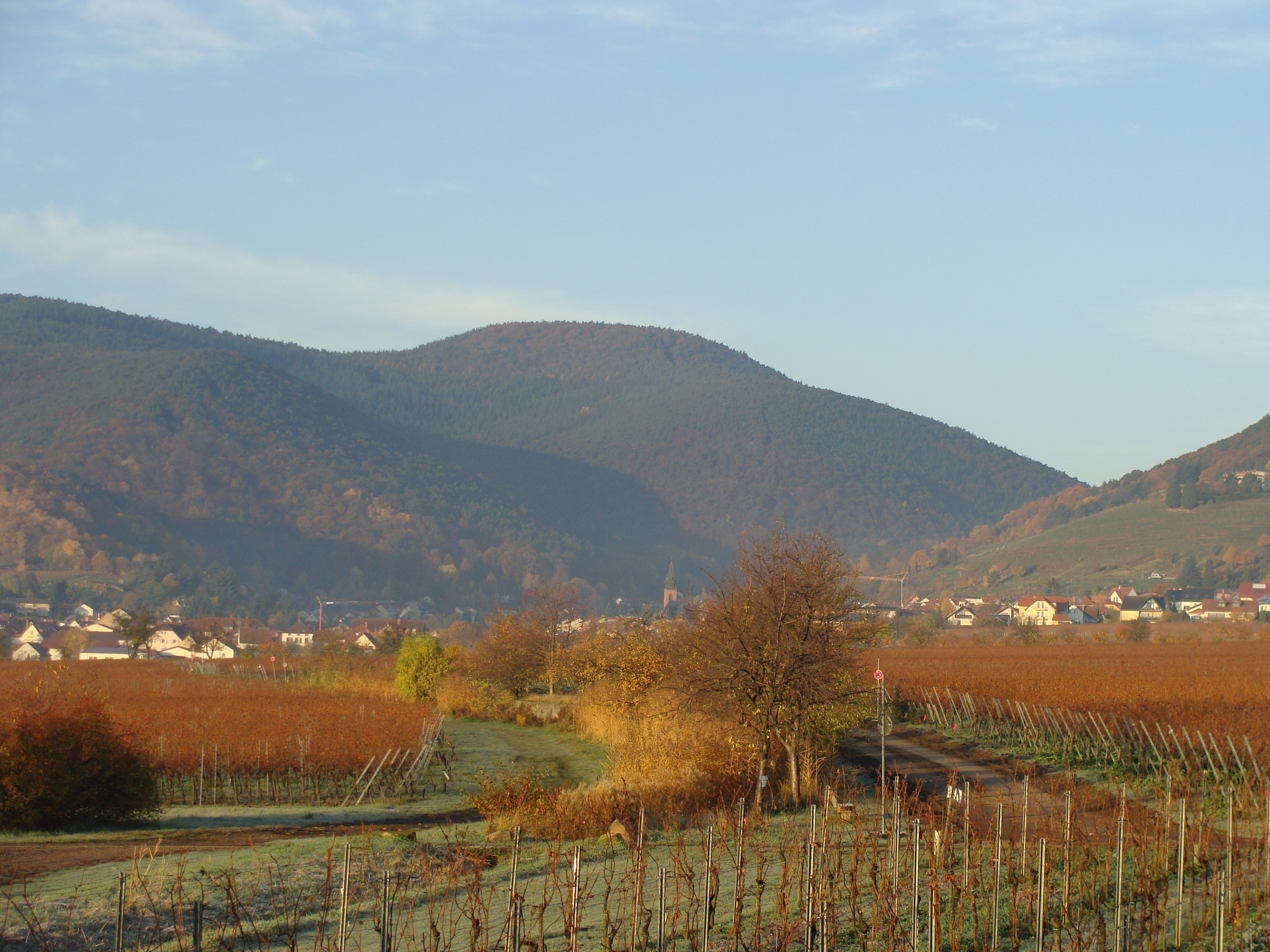
Hochberg

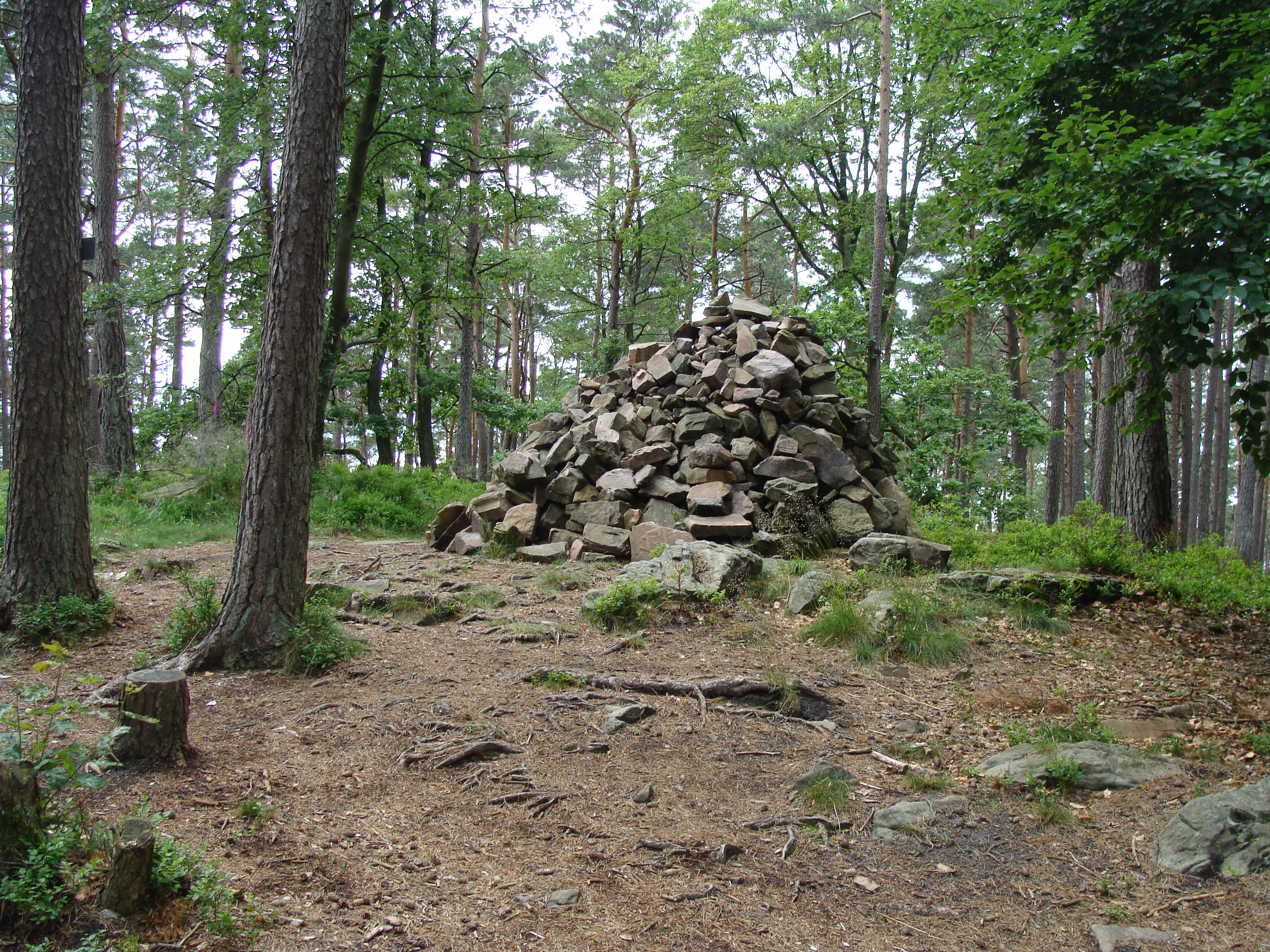
The Steinernes Köppl at the summit in summer

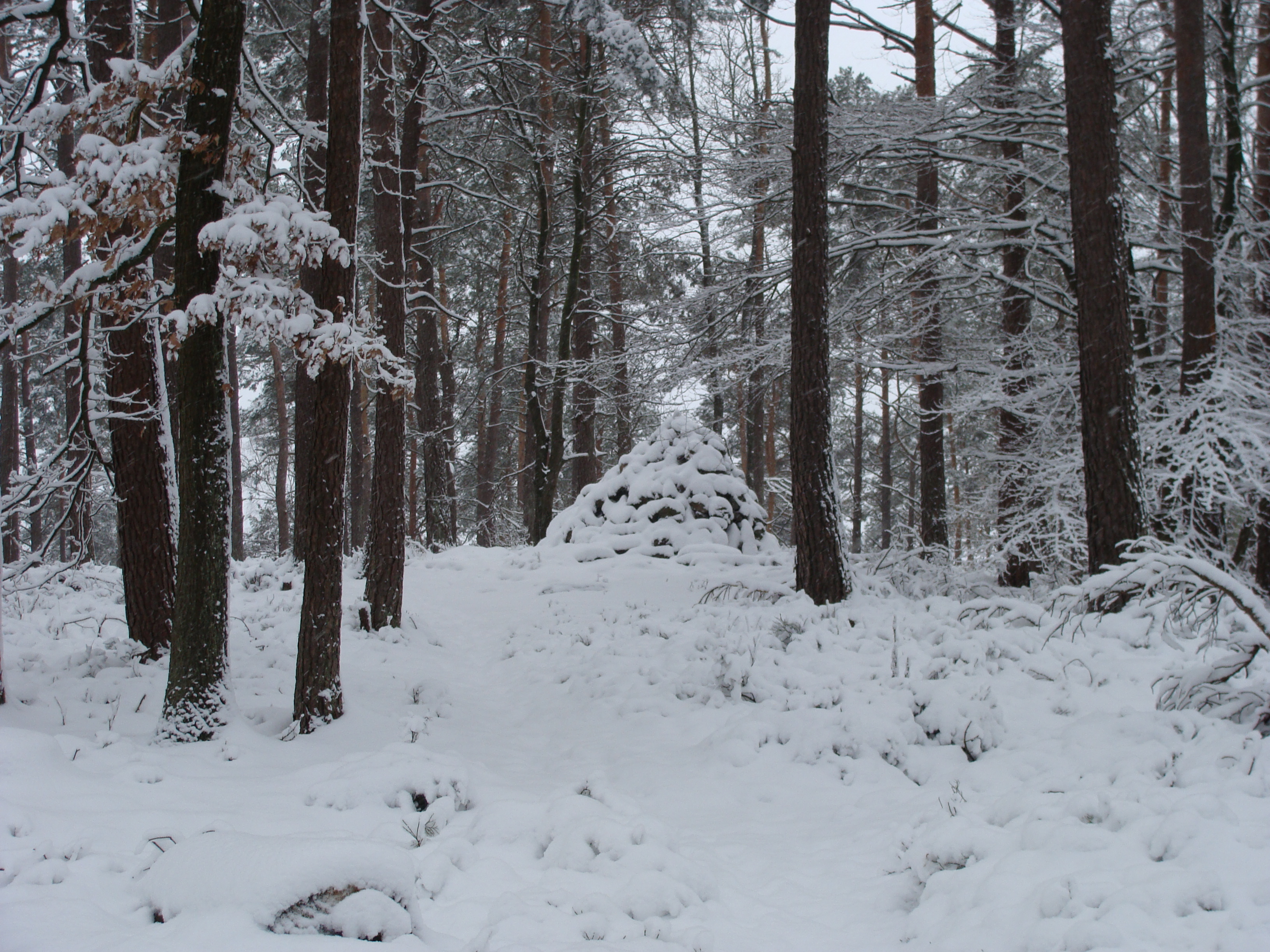
The Steinernes Köppl at the summit in winter

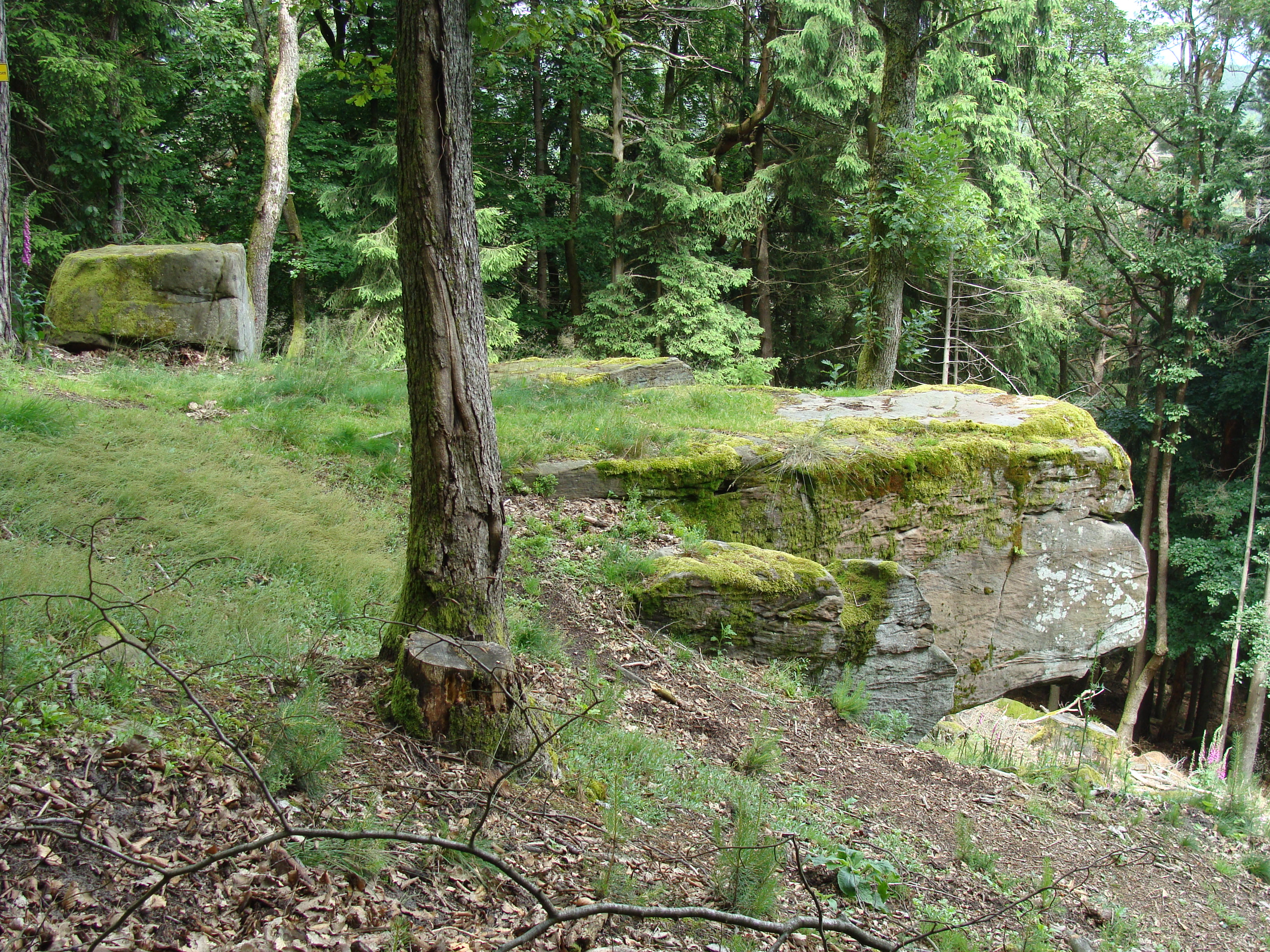
The Schornsteinfelsen rocks

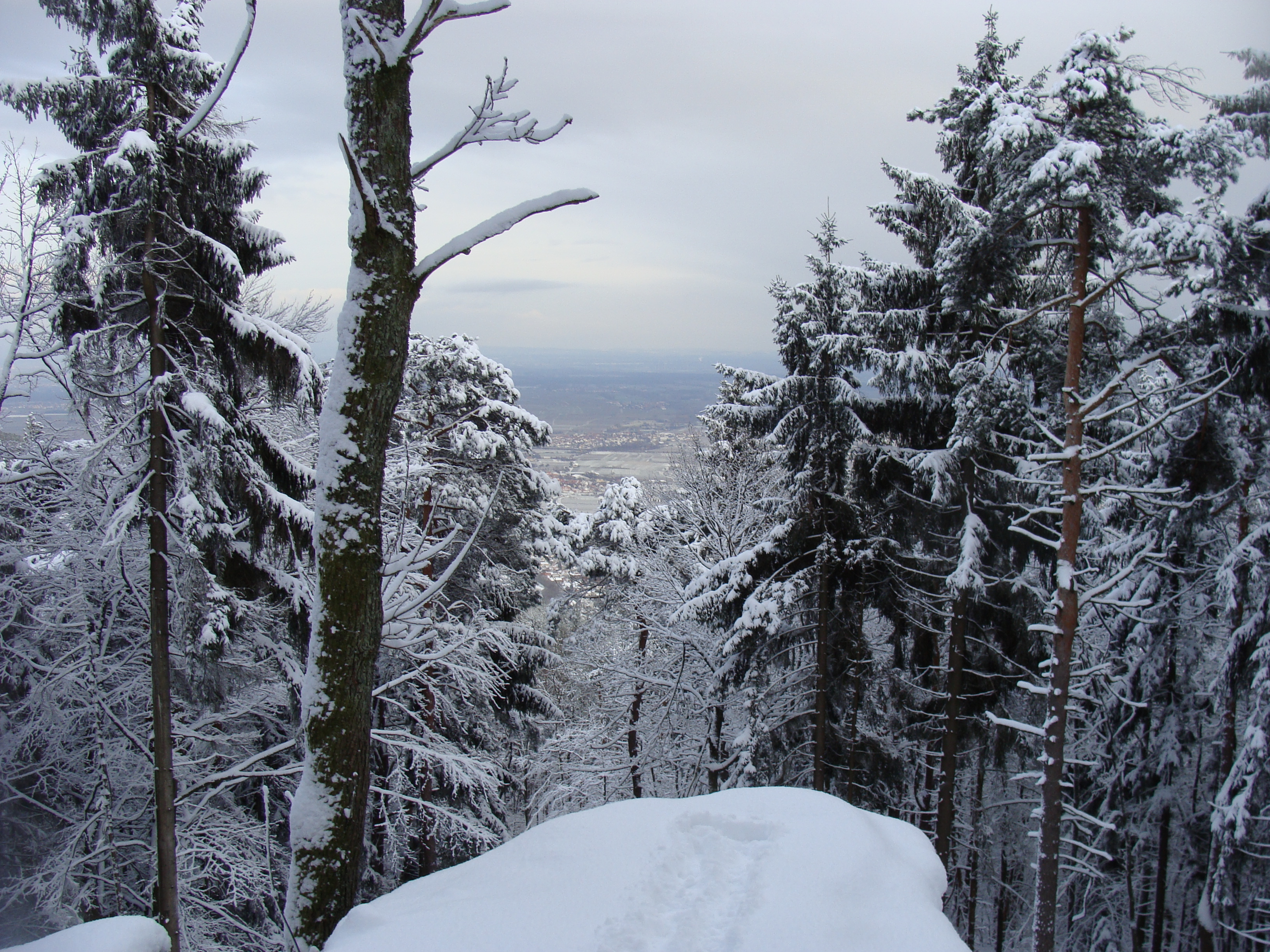
View from the Schornsteinfelsen rocks
