= Wetterkreuzberg =

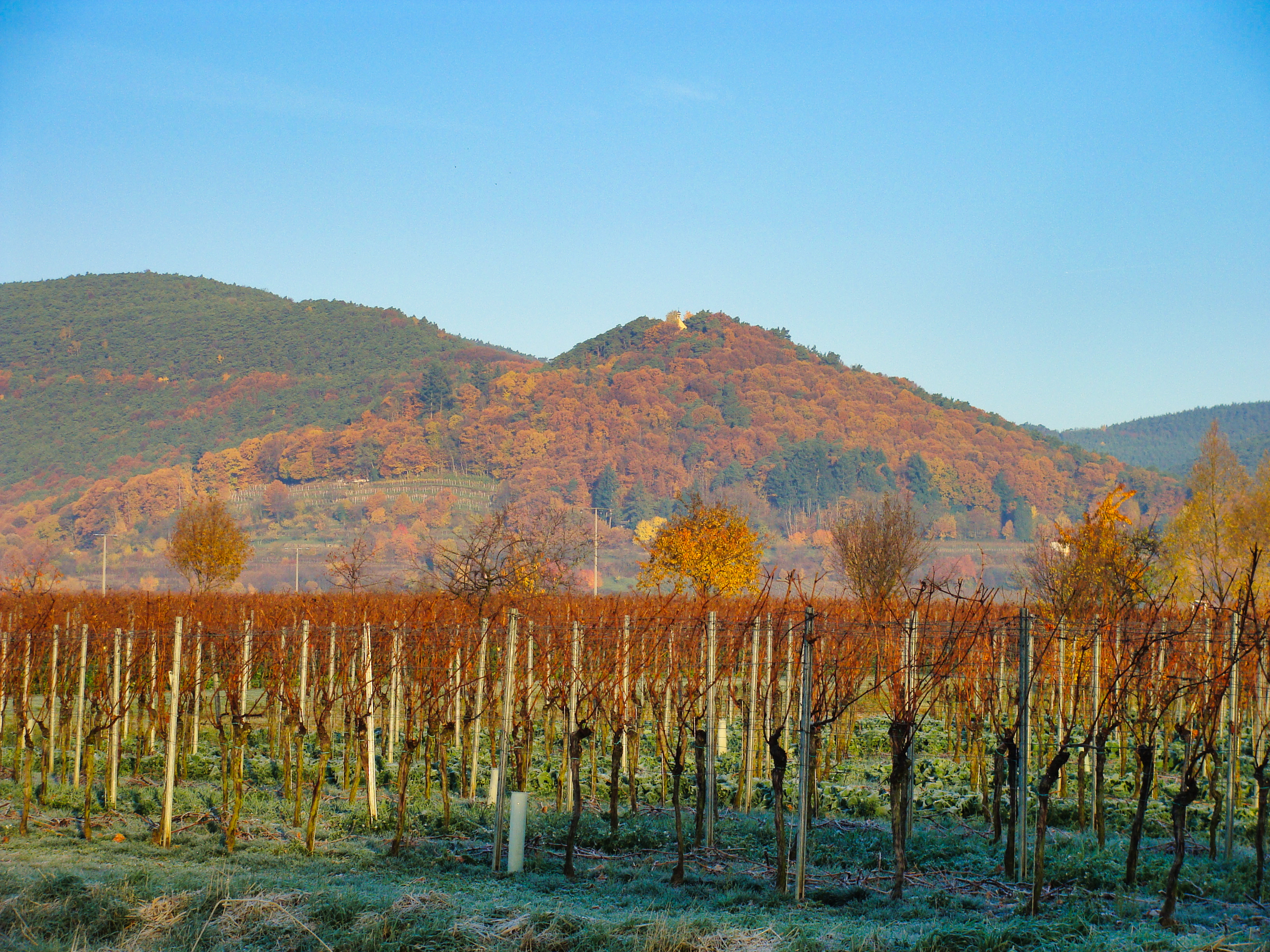
- The Wetterkreuzberg seen from Maikammer

Highest point
- Elevation: 400.7 m above sea level (NHN) (1,315 ft)
- Coordinates: 49°18′45″N 8°06′26″E

Geography
- Location within Rhineland-Palatinate
- Location: Rhineland-Palatinate, Germany
- Features: Chapel of Maria-Schutz-Kapelle
- Parent range: Haardt, Palatine Forest

The Wetterkreuzberg (400.7 m above NHN) is a hill in the Haardt range on the eastern edge of the Palatine Forest in the German state of Rhineland-Palatinate.

== Location ==
The Wetterkreuzberg, like the Breitenberg (545.2 m), the Taubenkopf (603.8 m) and the Kanzel (531.7 m), is one of the outlying peaks of the Kalmit massif (672.6 m). It is located in an exposed location right on the edge of the Haardt so that, despite its low elevation, it is seen from places in the Rhine Plain as a prominent peak. To the north the hill is linked to the Kanzel over a shallow saddle. At the summit is a chapel to St. Mary (the Maria-Schutz-Kapelle) which is visible from a long way off. The hill belongs to the parish of Maikammer.

The Kalmitstraße road, which runs from Maikammer to the Hüttenhohl runs across the hill. Just below the summit there is a walker's car park. The summit may be gained on footpaths from the Maikammer hamlet of Alsterweiler, from St. Martin or even from the Klausental Hut.

== Gallery ==
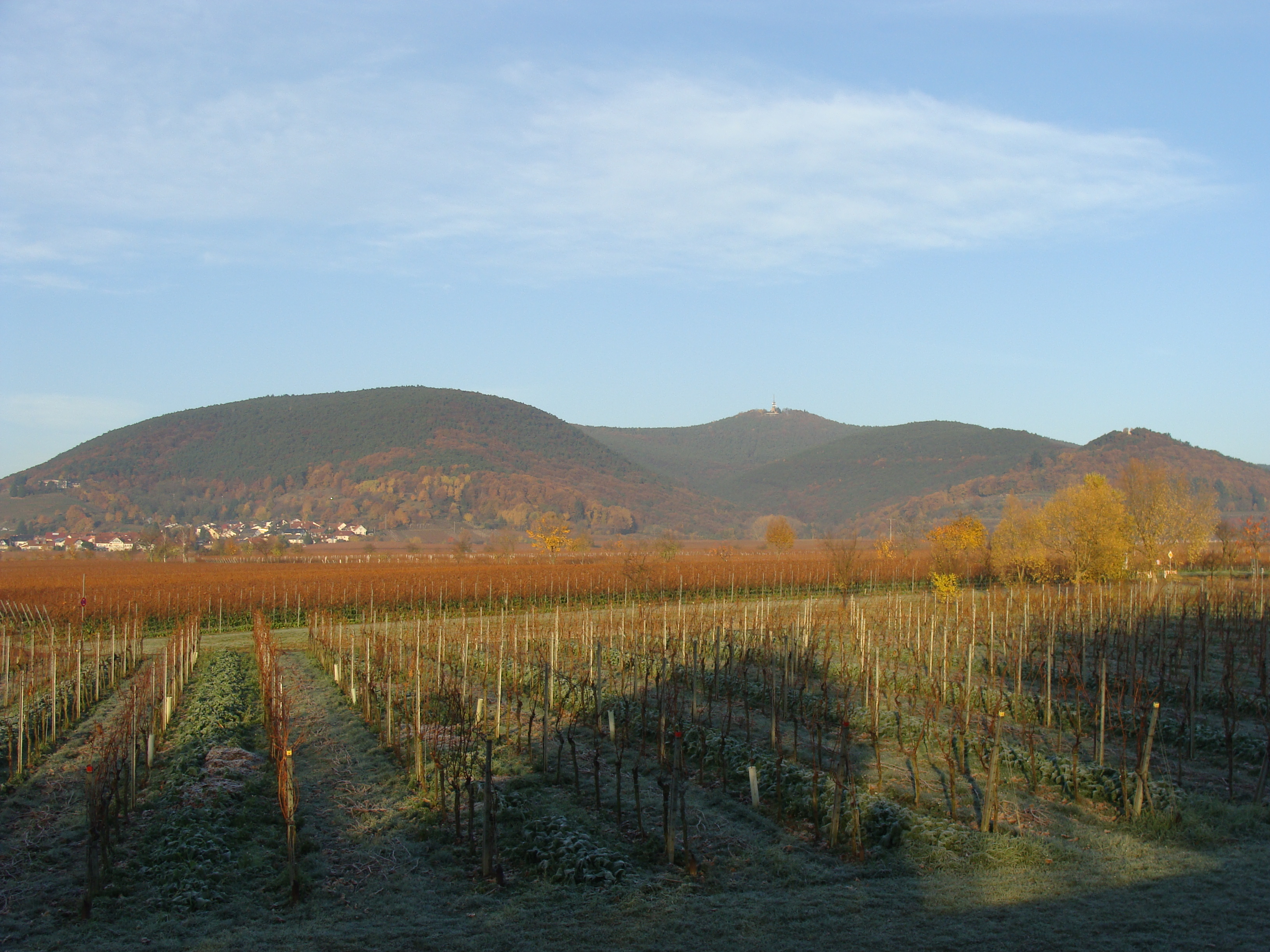
The Kalmit Massif seen from Maikammer with the Breitenberg, Kalmit, Kanzel and Wetterkreuzberg

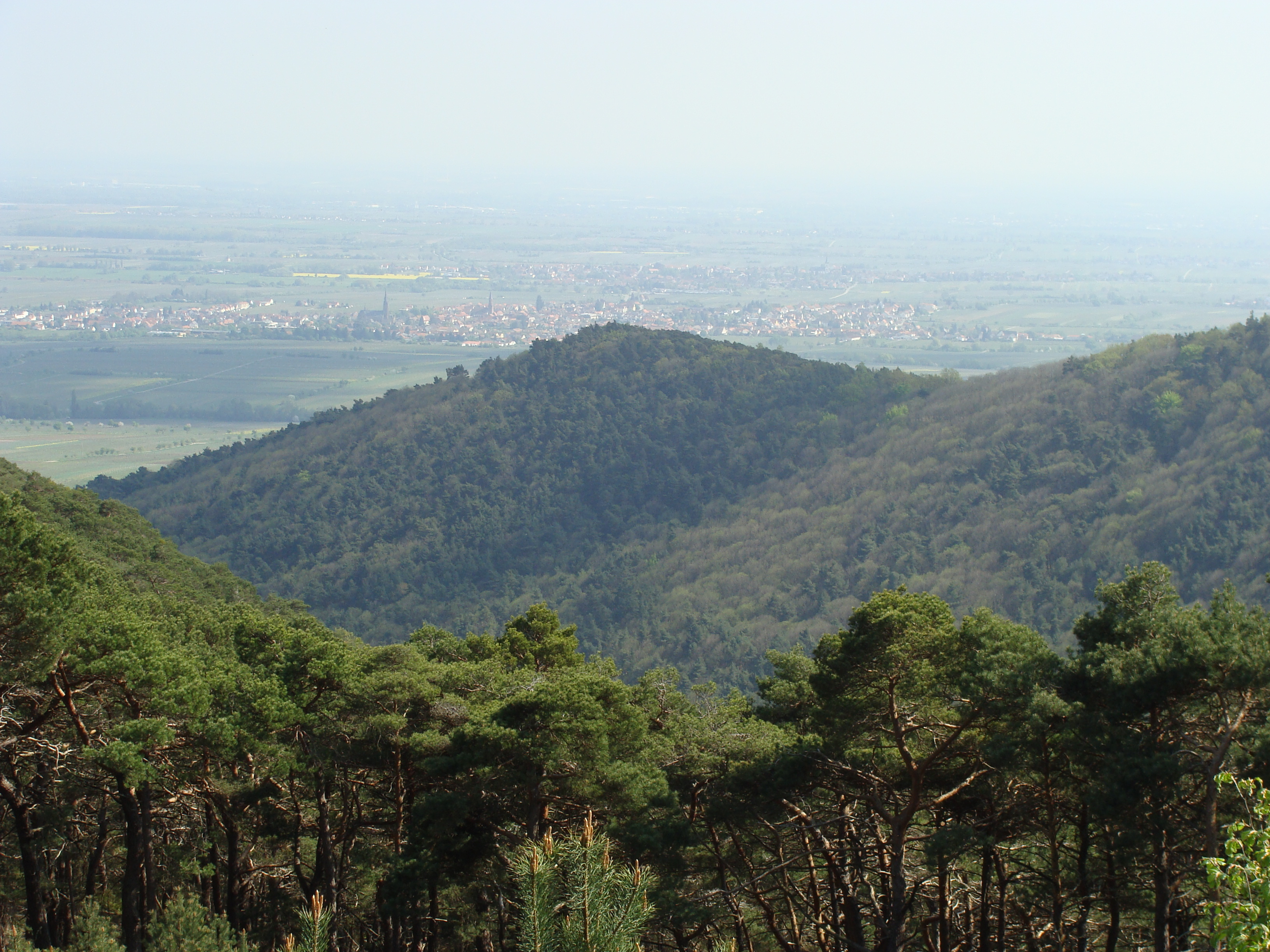
The Wetterkreuzberg seen from Sommerberg

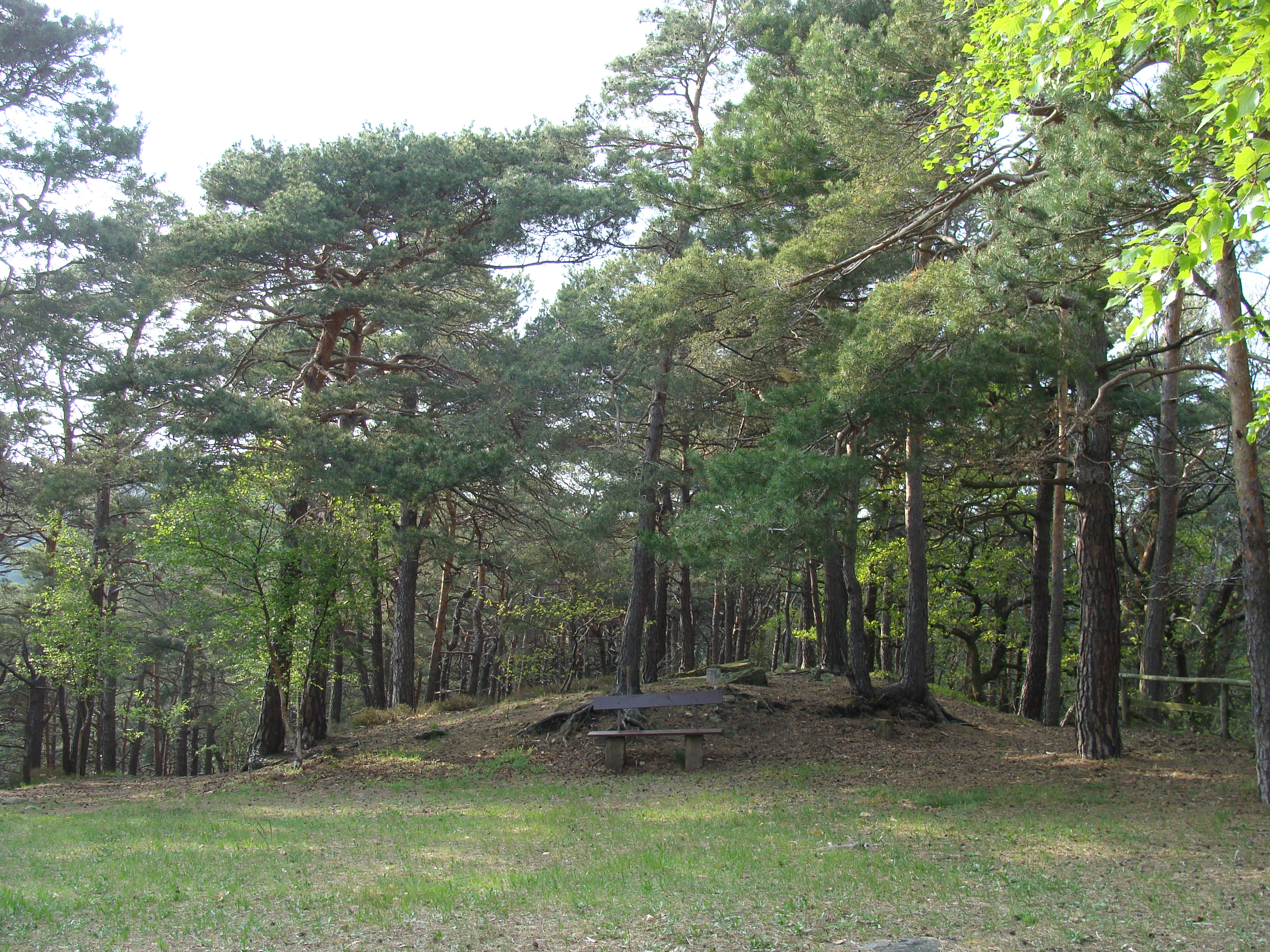
The summit

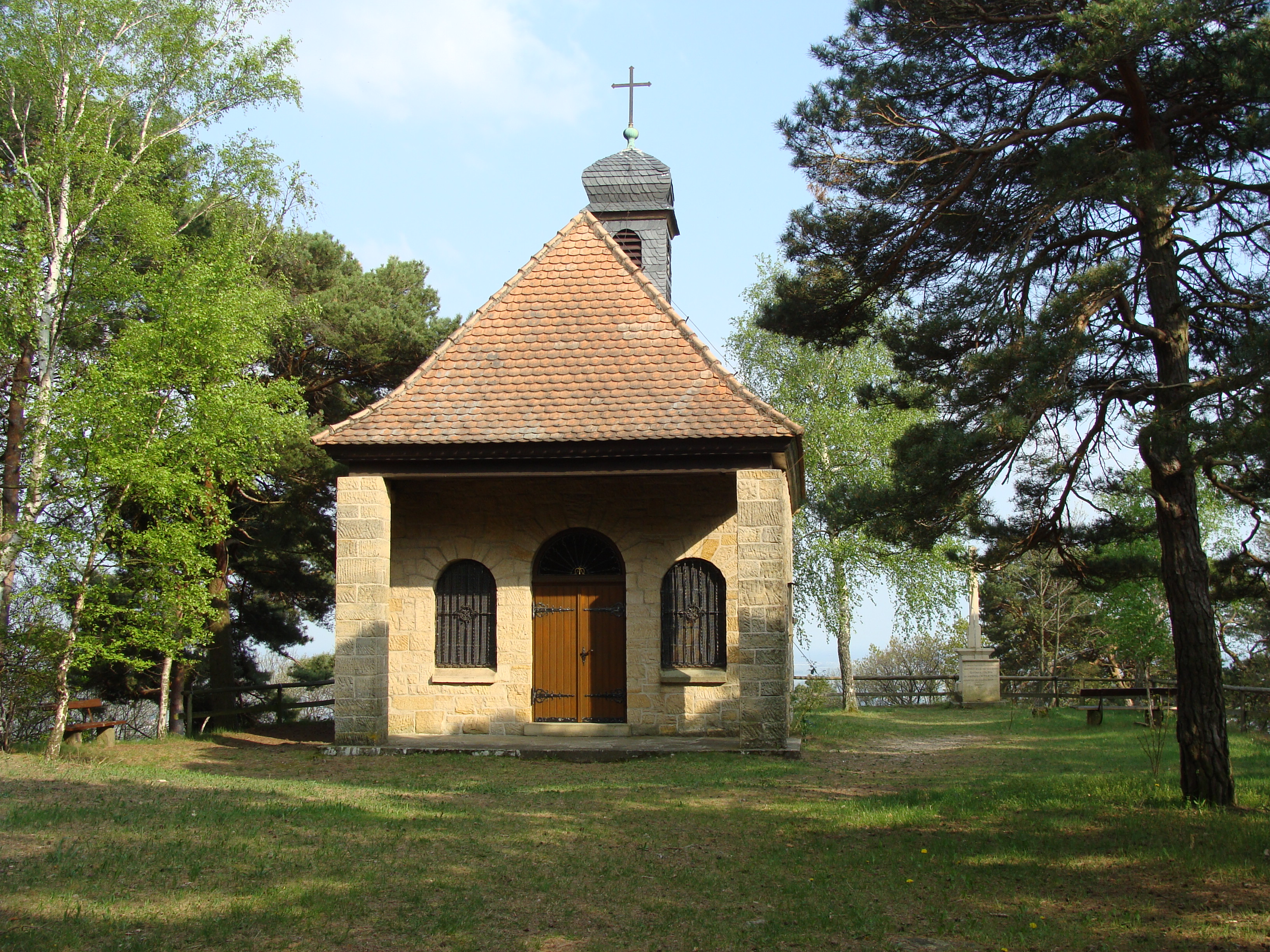
The chapel on the Wetterkreuzberg

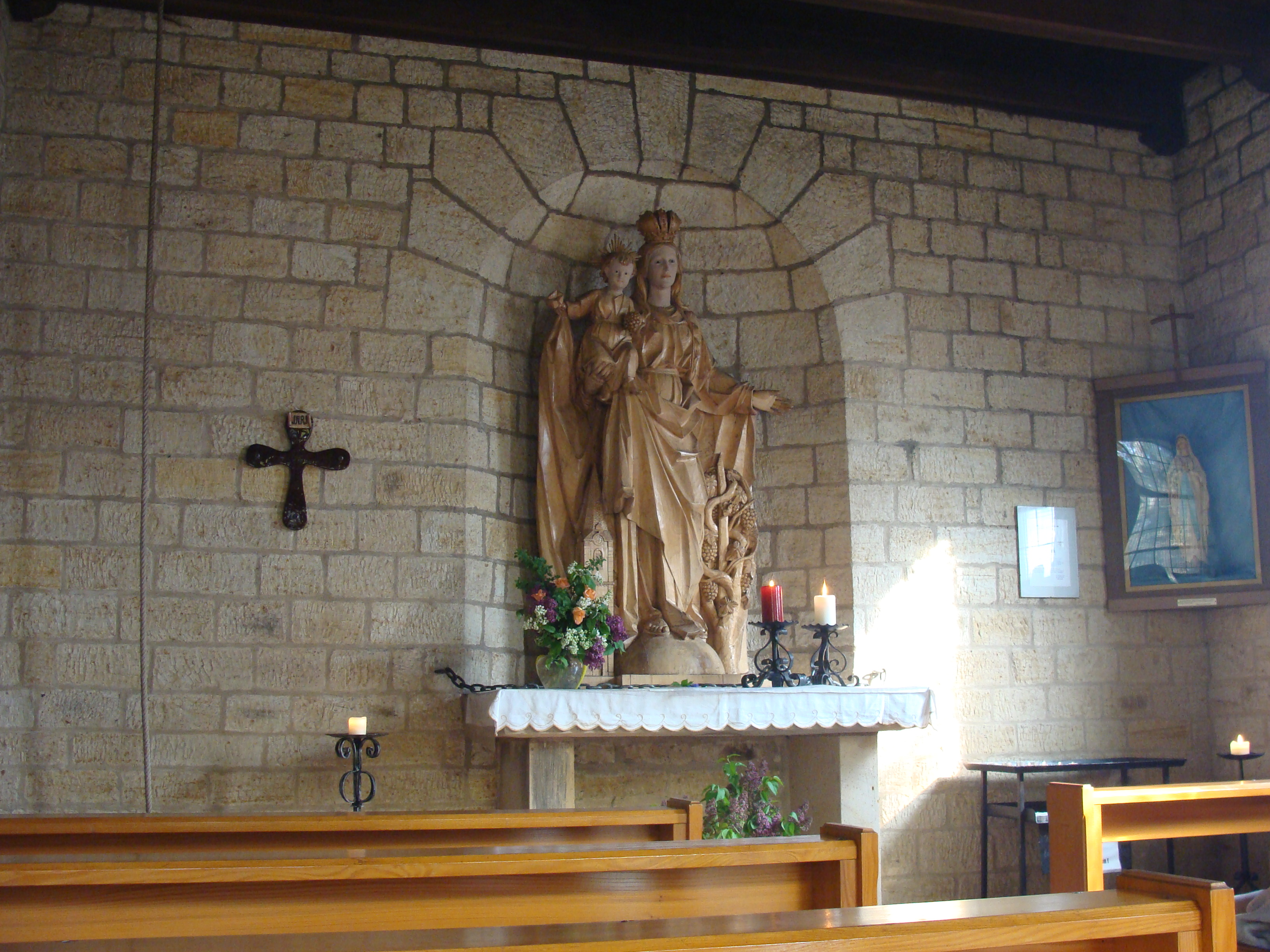
Altar of the chapel on the Wetterkreuzberg

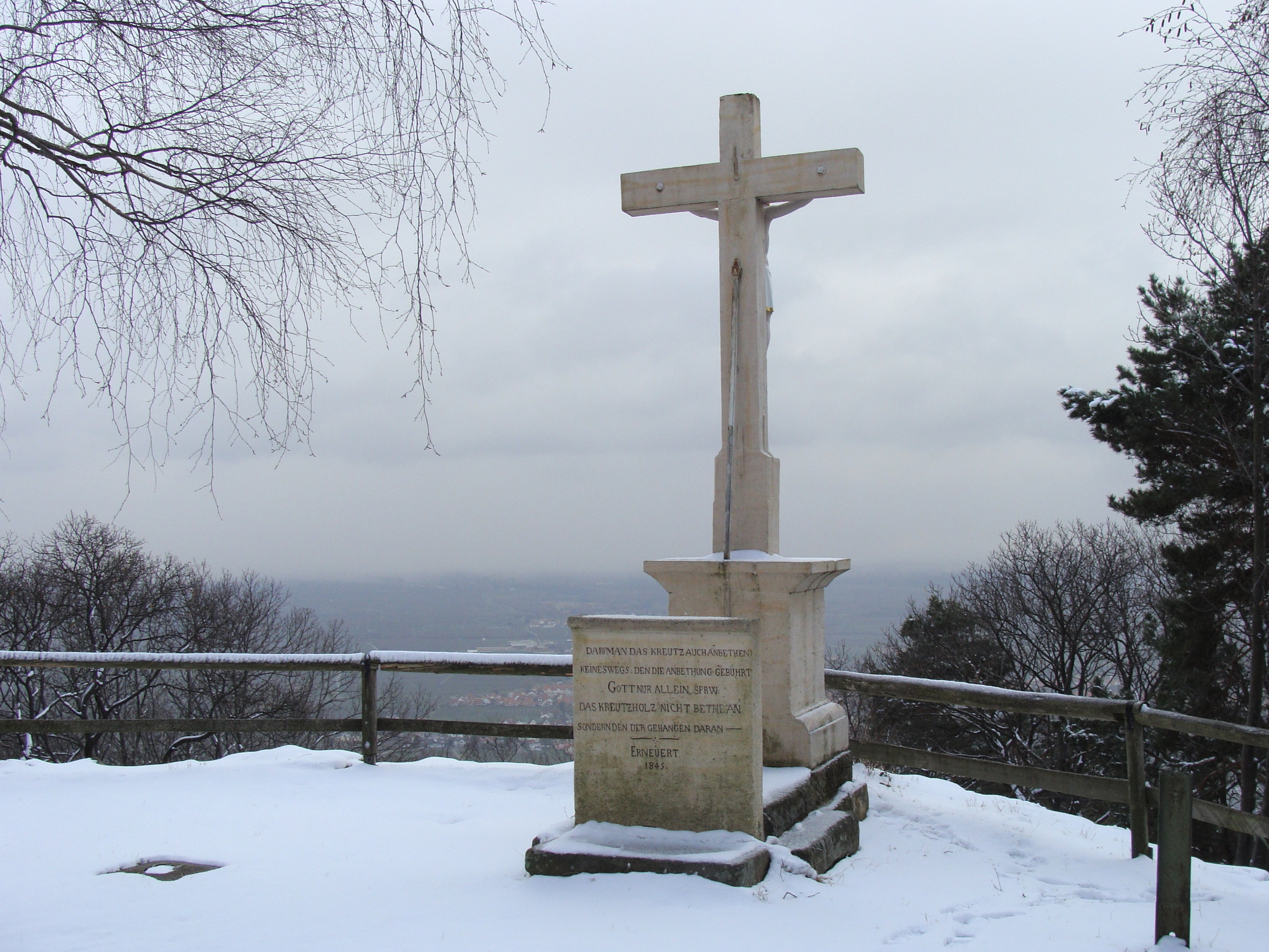
The Wetterkreuz
