= Taubenkopf =

Taubenkopf is the name of the following hills in Germany:

- Taubenkopf (Haardt), a hill in the Haardt mountains of Rhineland-Palatinate
- Taubenkopf (Sickingen Heights), a hill in the northern part of the Sickingen Heights
