= Hohe Loog =

Hohe Loog may refer to the following places in Germany:

- Hohe Loog (Haardt), a mountain in the Haardt range near Neustadt an der Weinstraße
- a high point on the Eselsohler Berg
- part of the plain of Hohe Ebene near Neidenfels

See also

- Loog
