= Breitenberg (Haardt) =

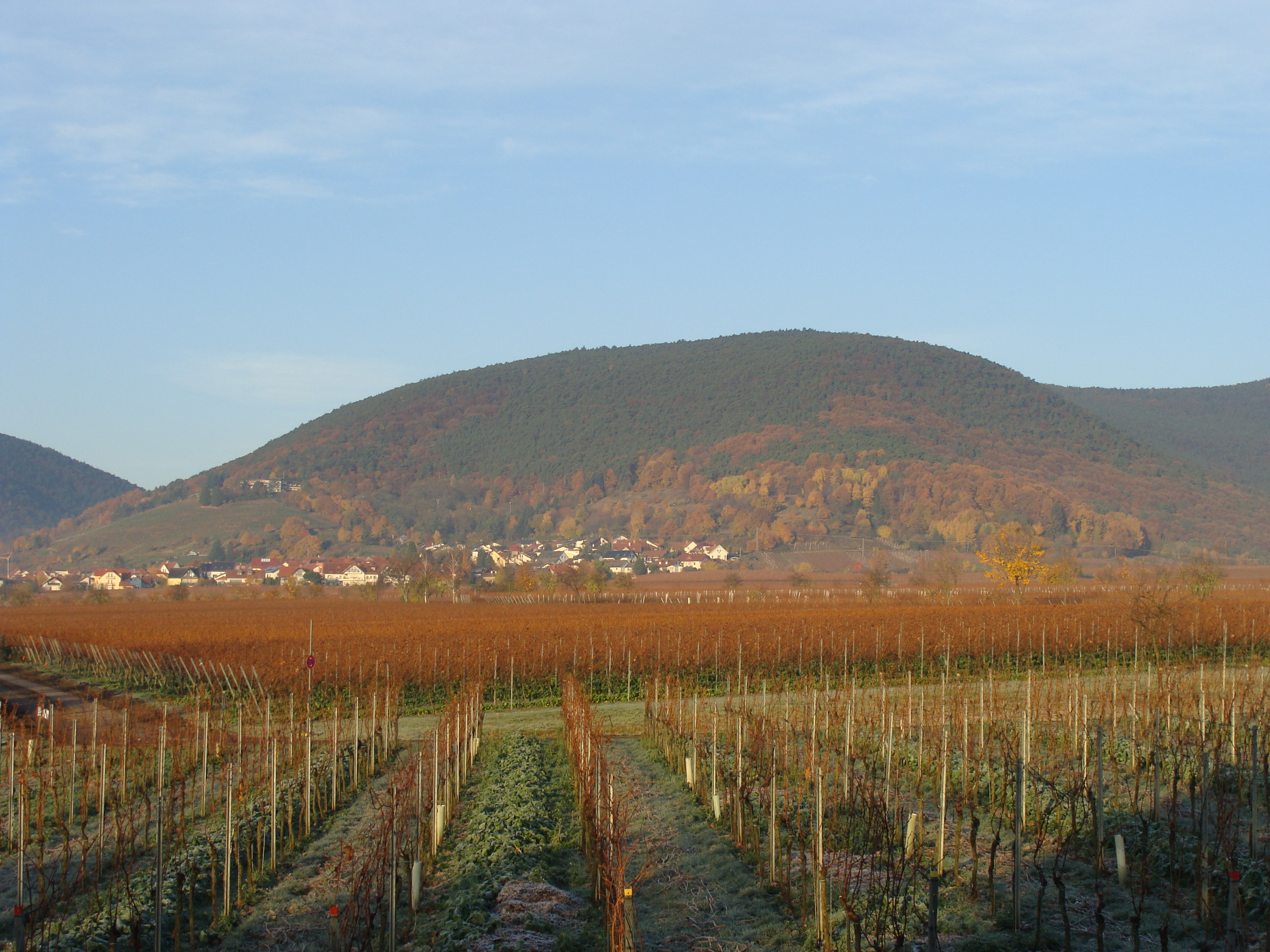
- View from Maikammer of the Breitenberg with the village of Sankt Martin at its southeastern foot

Highest point
- Elevation: 545.2 m above sea level (NHN) (1,789 ft)
- Coordinates: 49°18′32″N 8°05′25″E

Geography
- Location within Rhineland-Palatinate
- Location: near Sankt Martin; Südliche Weinstraße, Rhineland-Palatinate (Germany)
- Parent range: Haardt, Pfälzerwald

The Breitenberg near Sankt Martin in the Rhineland-Palatinate county of Südliche Weinstraße is a hill, 545.2 m above sea level (NHN), and subpeak of the Kalmit, the highest mountain in the Palatinate Forest. It is part of the Haardt mountains.

== Geography ==
=== Location ===
The Breitenberg lies within both the Palatinate Forest-North Vosges Biosphere Reserve and the Palatinate Forest Nature Park. Its summit rises 1.3 km northwest of Sankt Martin and 3 km west-northwest (both as the crow flies) of Maikammer, whose joint territorial boundary runs over the completely wooded hill. Like the Stotz (603.2 m), with which it is linked to the northwest over a gentle saddle (ca. 535 m), the Wetterkreuzberg (400.7 m), the Taubenkopf (603.8 m), the Hüttenberg (620.1 m) and the Kanzel (531.7 m) the Breitenberg is one of the subpeaks of the Kalmit massif (672.6 m). It is located in an exposed location on the eastern edge of the Haardt, so that it appears as a prominent hill despite its relatively low height above places in the Upper Rhine Plain.

== Transport and walking routes ==
The Kalmithöhenstraße, which runs inter alia past the Kalmit to the Hüttenhohl and is part of the Landesstraße 515 from Maikammer, crosses the highland northwest of the Breitenberg summit. Also northwest of the summit is a car park for walkers. The Breitenberg may be climbed from the Maikammer village of Alsterweiler, from Sankt Martin or from the Sankt Martin valley.

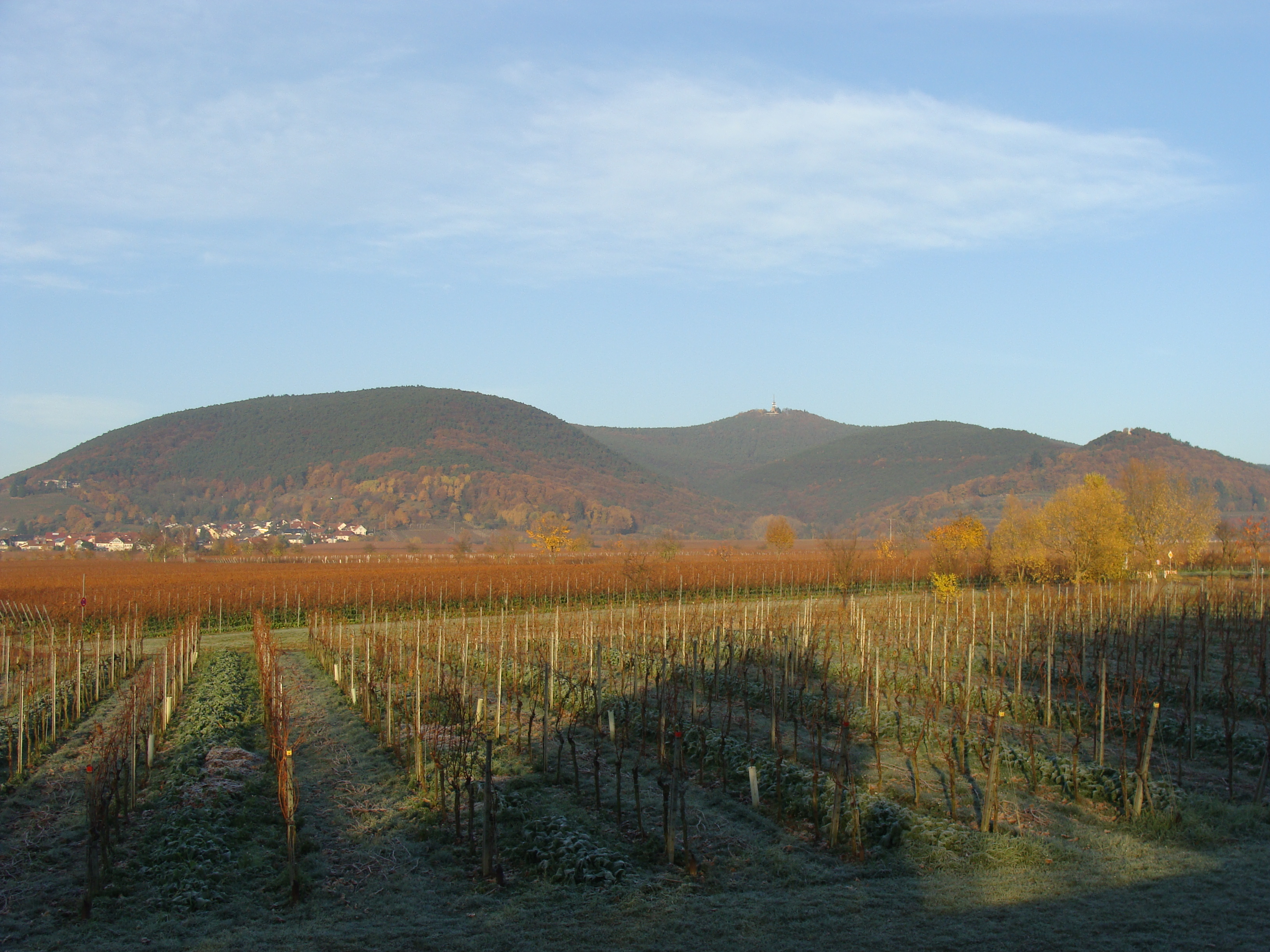
The Kalmit massif seen from Maikammer with the Breitenberg, Kalmit main summit, Kanzel and Wetterkreuzberg

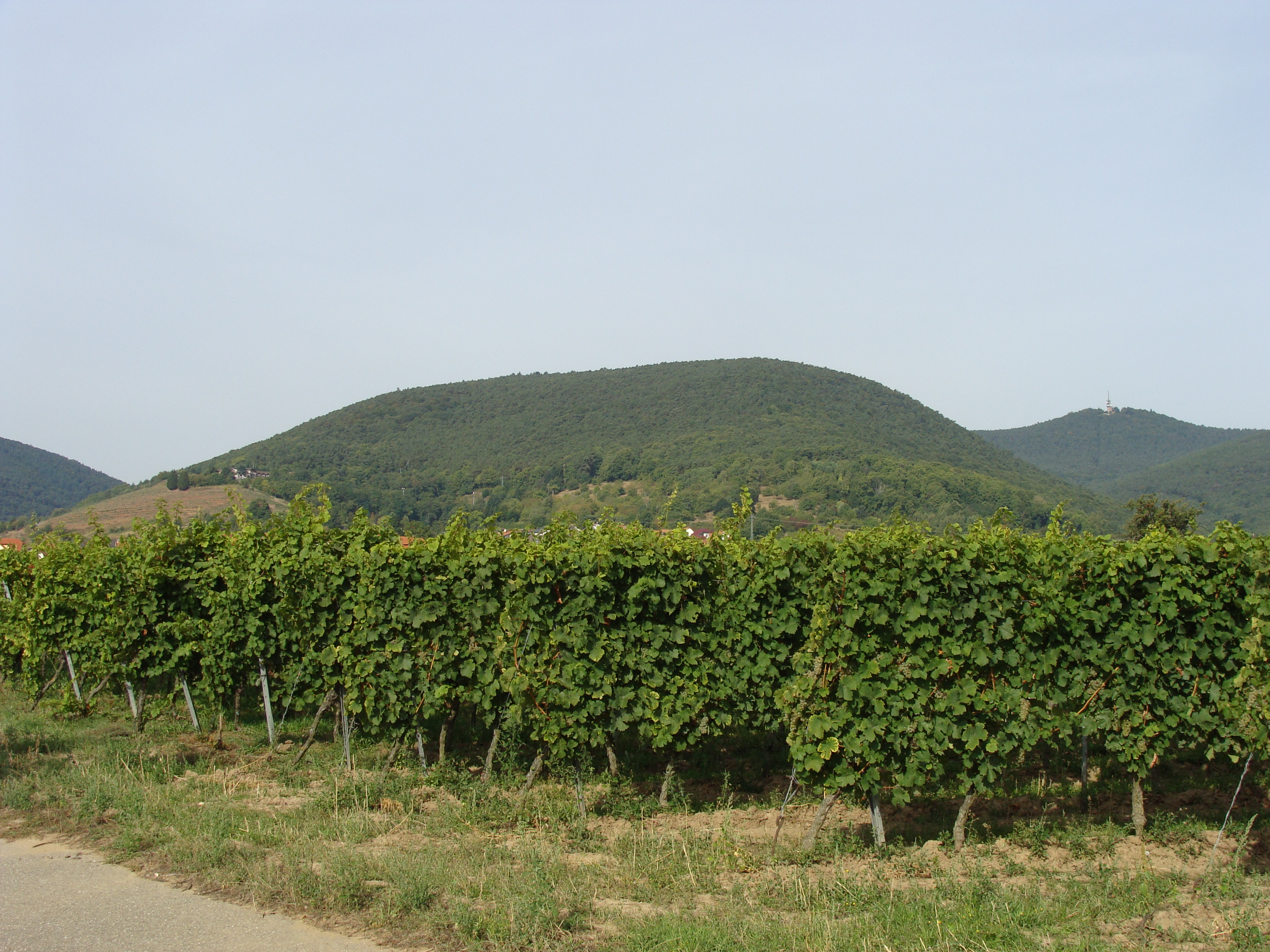
The Breitenberg
