= Stoppomat =

Time measure system for cyclists

The Stoppomat is a time measure system for cyclists.

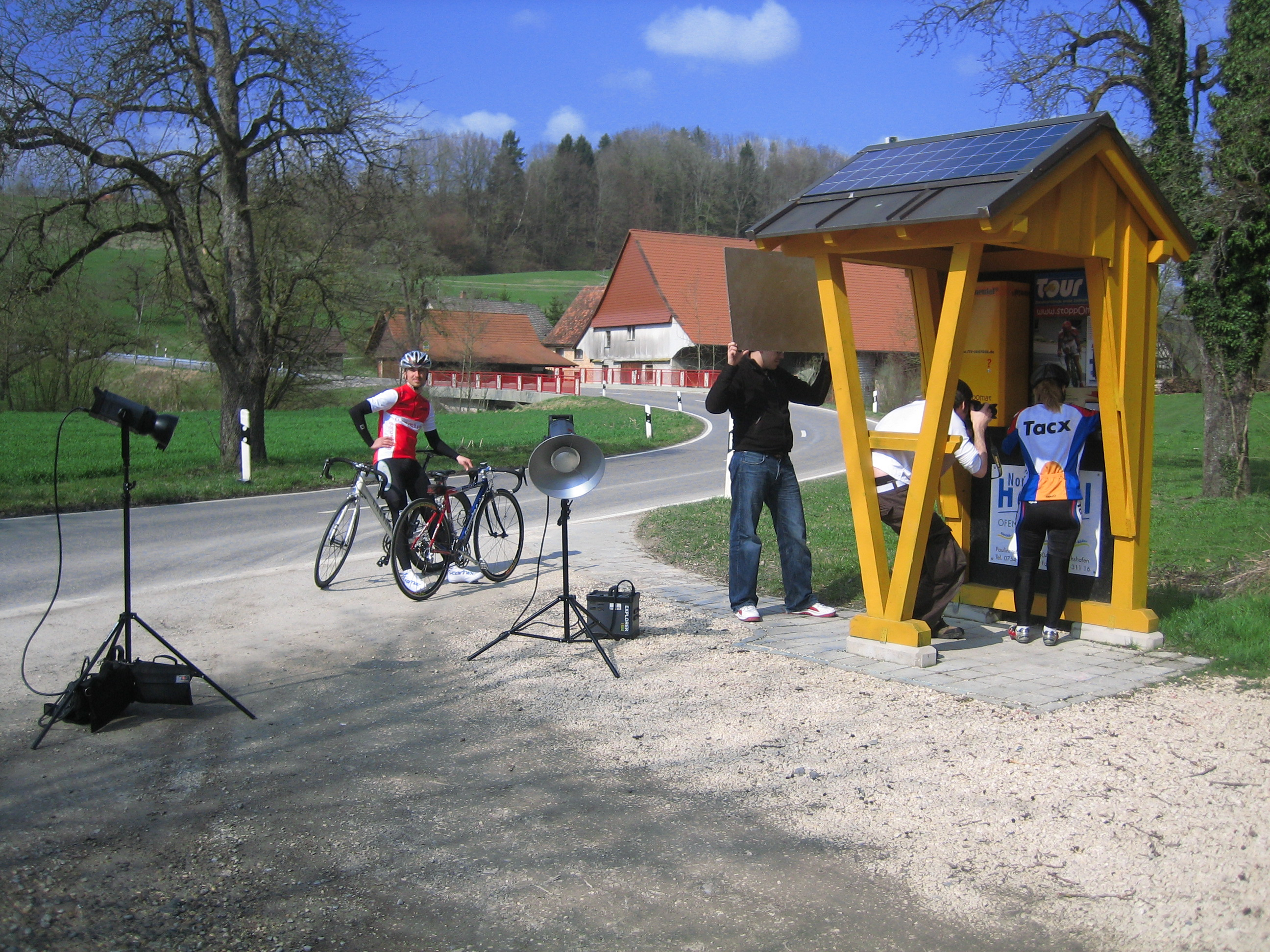
Start device at Urnau in Germany

== History ==
The Stoppomat was devised in Germany in 2005. The first installation was put into service in spring 2006. Similar devices have been manufactured in Switzerland and Austria. The Swiss Trophy, since 2003, uses three mobile plants at nine locations. Units have been used at Grossglockner and on Albulapass.

The first plant in Germany is on the Höchsten at 833 meters of altitude, the highest point in the District of Lake Constance. The start area is 499 meters above sea level.

The start house and the mountain station were planned in spring 2006 by the cycling club RSV Seerose e.V. from Friedrichshafen, built and put into operation. On the 8.2-kilometer-long stretch, 360 meters of elevation must be overcome to the summit. The course record is held by cyclist Jörg Ludewig of Wiesenhof–Felt with 16:09 minutes. This is an average speed of 30.46 kilometers per hour.

The main event at the plant is the annualLightweight Uphill. With 560 participants in 2006 and 620 participants in 2007, the competition is Germany's biggest cycling time trial. In the years 2006, 2007 and 2008, cyclists used the facility approximately 11,800 times to document their training times or entwine permit. Each year 22,000 athletes use the Stoppomat system. About 55% use the registration and each comes to use the system 2.5 times each year.

2013 First plant for mountainbikes opened in black forest in the valley of Renchtal. A combinated plant for racebikers and mountainbiker on two tracks.

== Handling ==
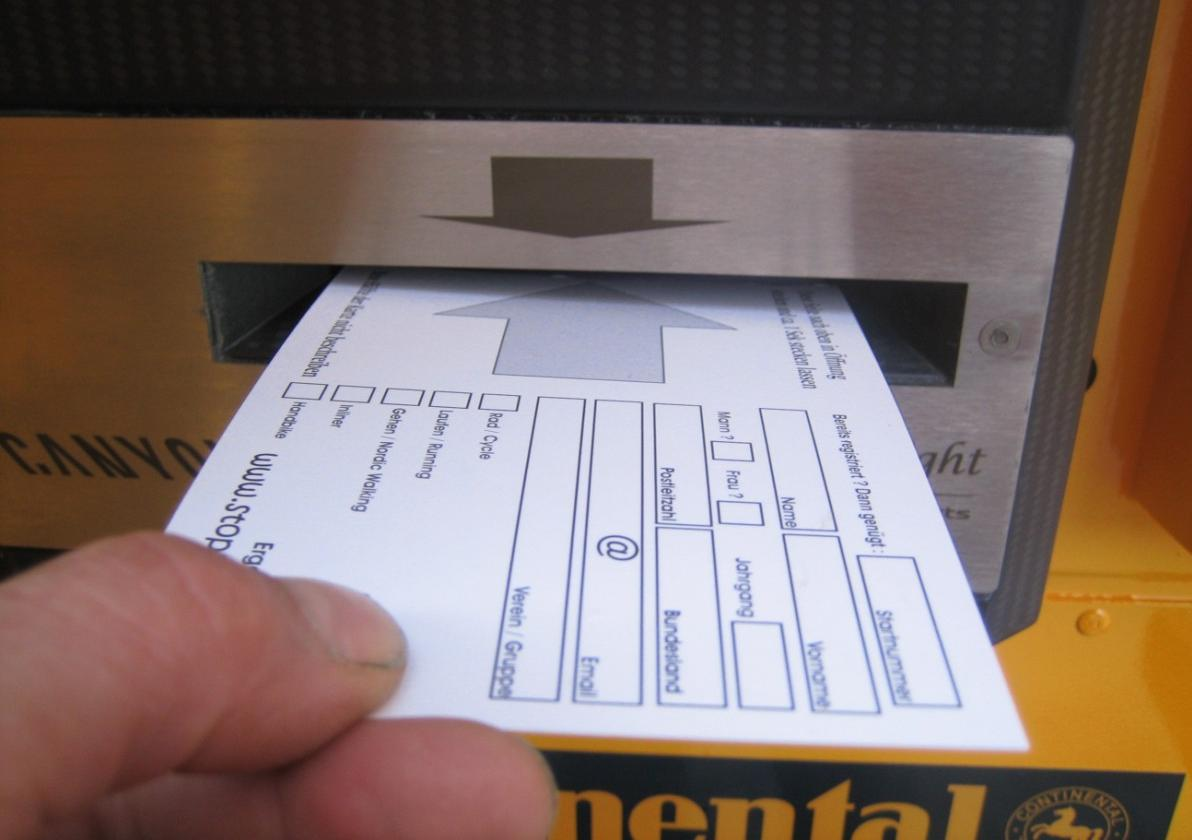
How to handle the card

The device enables the documentation of run results for cyclists.

- The athlete draws a card from the card dispenser,
- For the start timing the card is stamped with the time,
- The card is stamped at the destination,
- The athlete leaves the card in a box. This is regularly emptied and the data entered into a database. The results are available on a website for retrieval.

== Components of Stoppomat ==
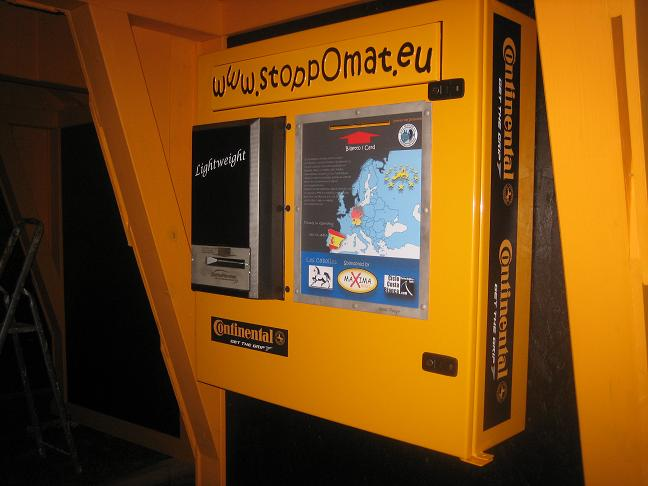
Housing of the Spanish Stoppomat

- The device consists of a metal casing and at least two radiocontrolled clocks. It can stamp time cards in various formats.
- The documented start, intermediate and end times can be further processed.
- The Stoppomat is equipped with electronics with printing function, a stopwatch with a DCF77 radio receiver and an independent power supply for a buffer period of one week.
- It is constructed to be resistant to vandalism, rain and temperature extremes.
- It is based on the Linux input and output software. It sorts scores, by age, sex, origin, association membership, shows, zip codes and sports equipment.

Second generation

- The case has a carbon housing for the stamp unit.
- The station is protected by a shelter from excessive weather.

== Inventor and developer ==
The inventor and developer of Stoppomat is Roland Hecht, who lives at the lakeside of the Lake Constance. Developer of the datasystem, homepage and value system is Dr.Th.Bischof also living at the lake.

== TOUR Stoppomat Challenge ==
Since winter of 2007/2008 several new plants have been built, which are operated by volunteers from sports clubs and by local sponsors. Since the introduction of a nationwide seriesTOUR Stoppomat-Challenge in 2008, 25.000 athletes have participated.

Plants have been put into operation at:

- Hoher Meissner (Werra-Meißner-Kreis)
- Kalmit (Haardt) | Kalmit (Neustadt an der Weinstrasse)
- Königsstuhl (Odenwald/Germany) | Königsstuhl (District of Heidelberg)
- Hirschhorn (District Bergstrasse)
- Pfullingen (Reutlingen)
- Höchsten (District lake of constance)
- Gauernitz (Meissen)
- Parcent (Alicante / Spain)
- Suderburg / ( Lüneburger Heide )
- Fuchshofen (District Adenau)
- Nitztal (District Mayen)
- Renchtal (District Oppenau) racebicycle and first mountainbike
- Grosser Feldberg (District Taunus) racebicycle and mountainbike
- Göllheim
- Roenckhausen (Sauerland)
- Koenigsstein (Elbsandsteingebirge)

To obtain the average of a series of ratings, an investment analysis software generates and sets this ratio to 100. The personal journey is set in relation to plant ratios and then added up in the series standings. Thus, the athlete can increase overall ratings by the use of multiple route.
