= Kalmit =

Highest peak in the Palatinate Forest, Germany

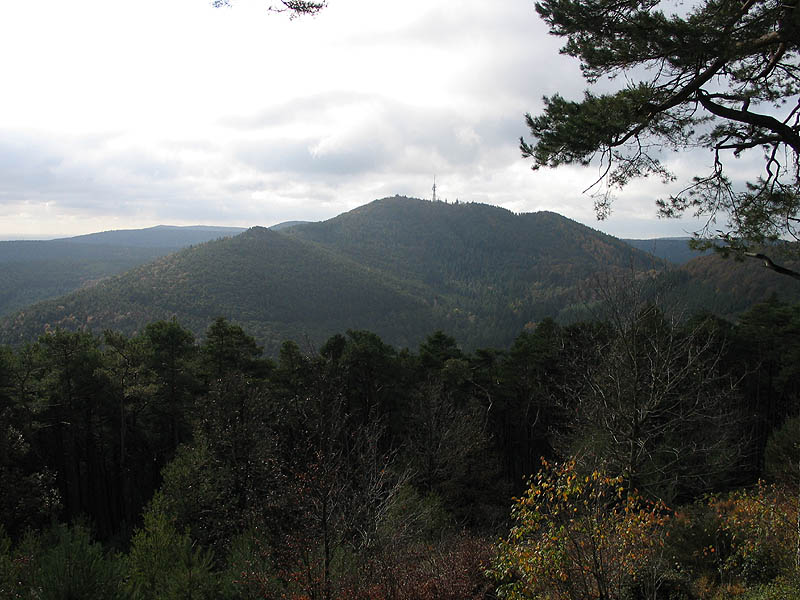
- The Kalmit

Highest point
- Elevation: 672.6 m above sea level (NN) (2,207 ft)
- Listing: Highest peak in the Palatine Forest
- Coordinates: 49°19′08″N 8°04′58″E

Geography
- Location within Rhineland-Palatinate
- Location: Palatine Forest (Rhineland-Palatinate, Germany)
- Parent range: Haardt

Geology
- Mountain type: Bunter Sandstone

The Kalmit is the highest peak in the Palatinate Forest and the second highest (after the Donnersberg) in the Palatinate region of Germany. It is 672.6 m above sea level (NHN) and located 5.5 kilometres (3.4 mi) south of the town of Neustadt an der Weinstraße.

The mountain attracts many tourists thanks to the numerous footpaths leading to its summit, its mountaintop restaurant, extensive views over the Palatinate wine region and striking rock formations on its forest-clad mountainsides.

== Geography ==
=== Location ===
The mountain lies within the municipal forest of the wine village of Maikammer and 6 kilometres (3.7 miles) southwest of the independent town of Neustadt an der Weinstraße. Several lower peaks are grouped around the main summit, including the Zwergberg (589.3 m) to the north, the Taubenkopf (603.8 m) to the northeast, the Kanzel (531.7 m) and the Wetterkreuzberg (400.7 m) to the southeast, the Breitenberg (545.2 m) to the south and the Hüttenberg (591.2 m) to the southwest. On the Hüttenberg ridge there is a blockfield or felsenmeer, which also bears that name, with great boulders of bunter sandstone on the surface of the terrain.

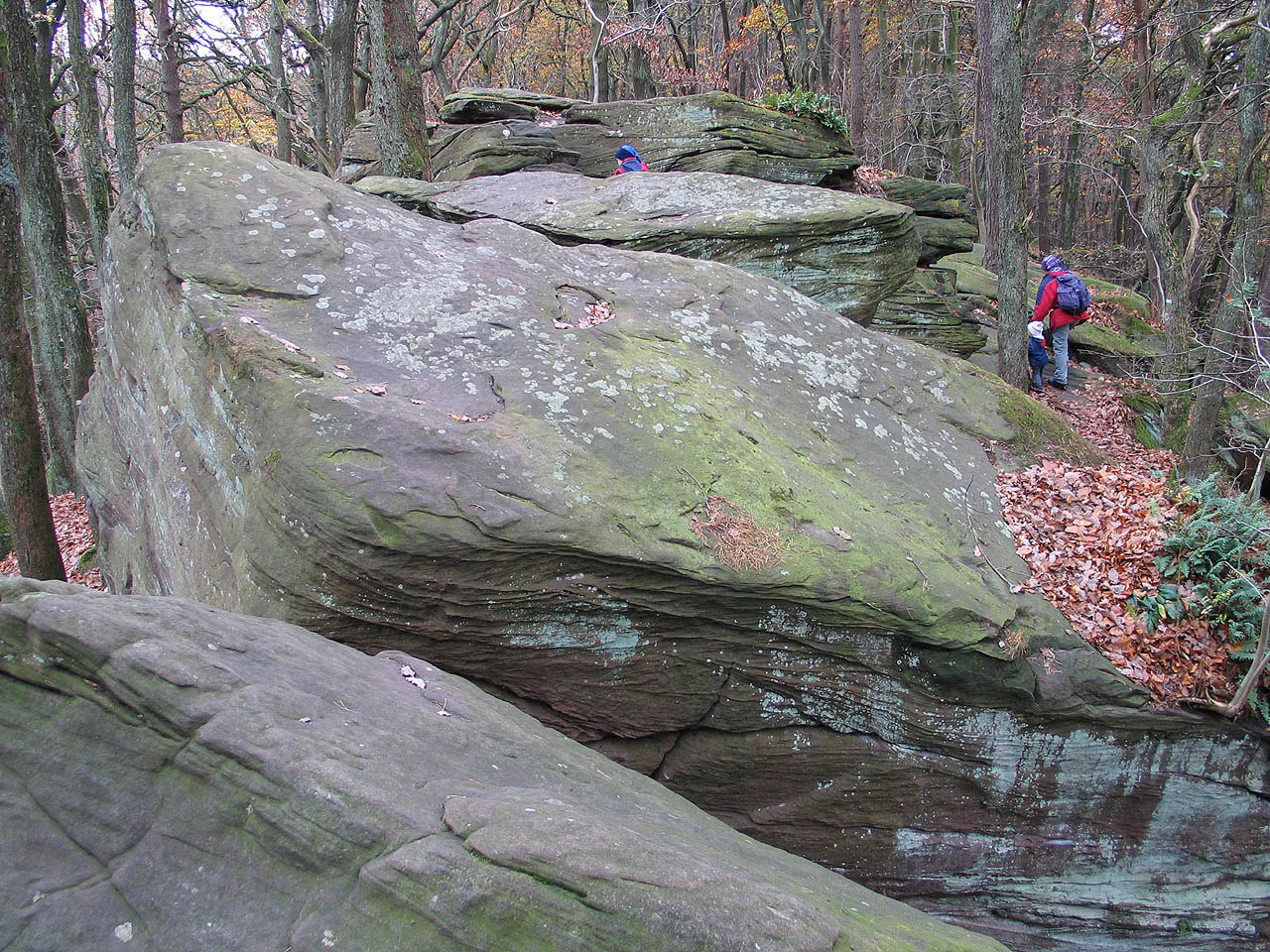
The Felsenmeer on the Hüttenberg on the Kalmit

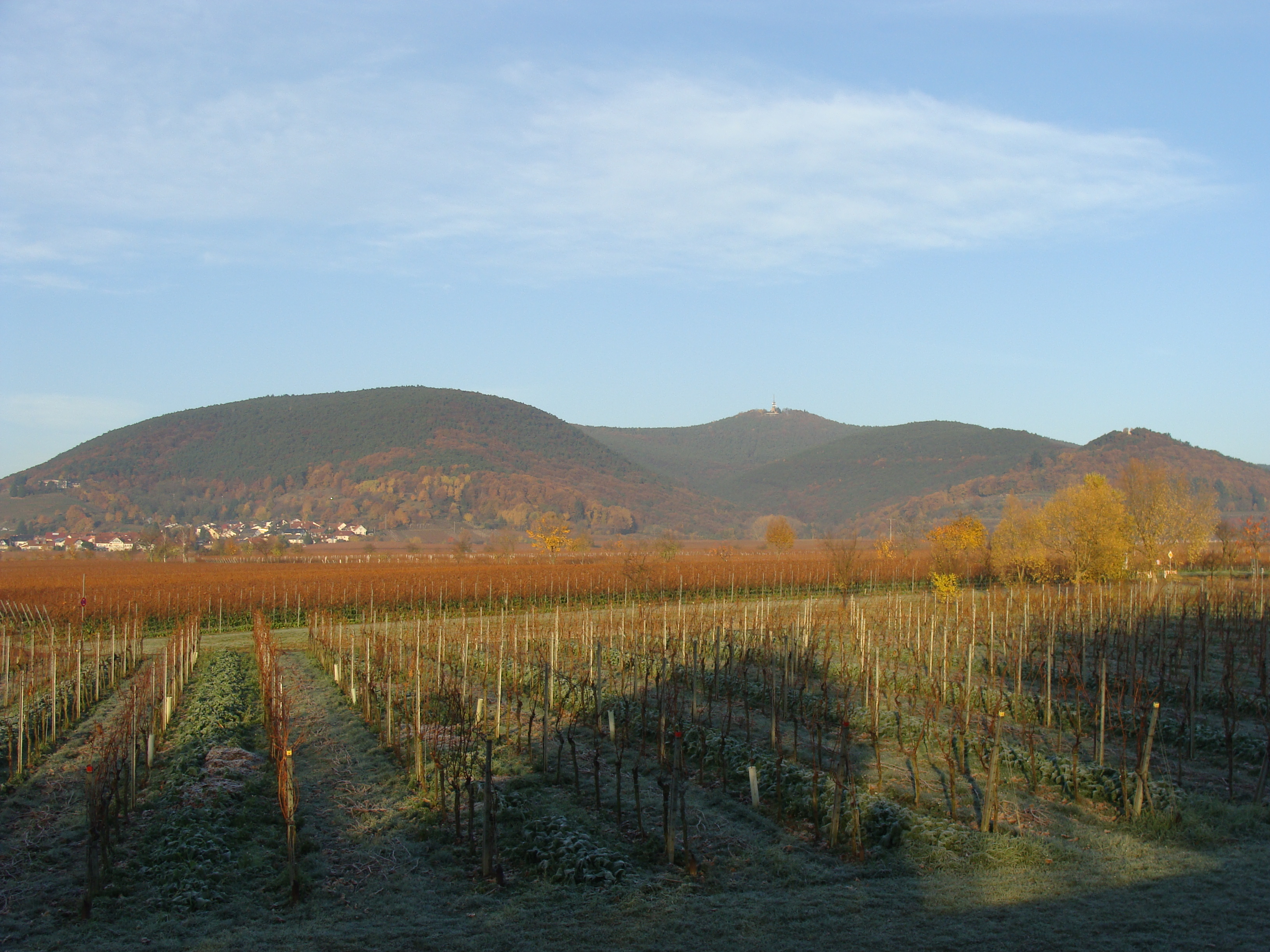
The Kalmit massif. From left to right: the Blättersberg, the Kalmit, the Kanzel and the Wetterkreuzberg

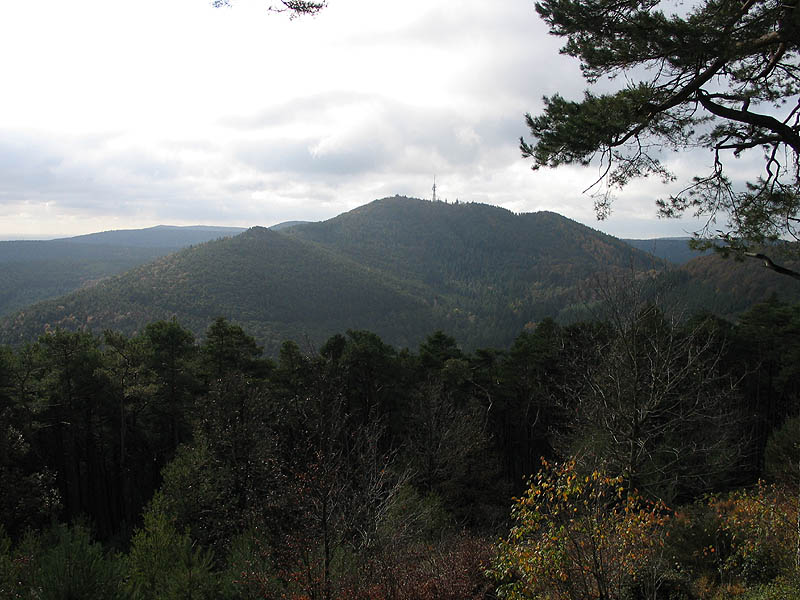
The Kalmit with the Taubenkopf in the foreground. View of the Hohe Loog

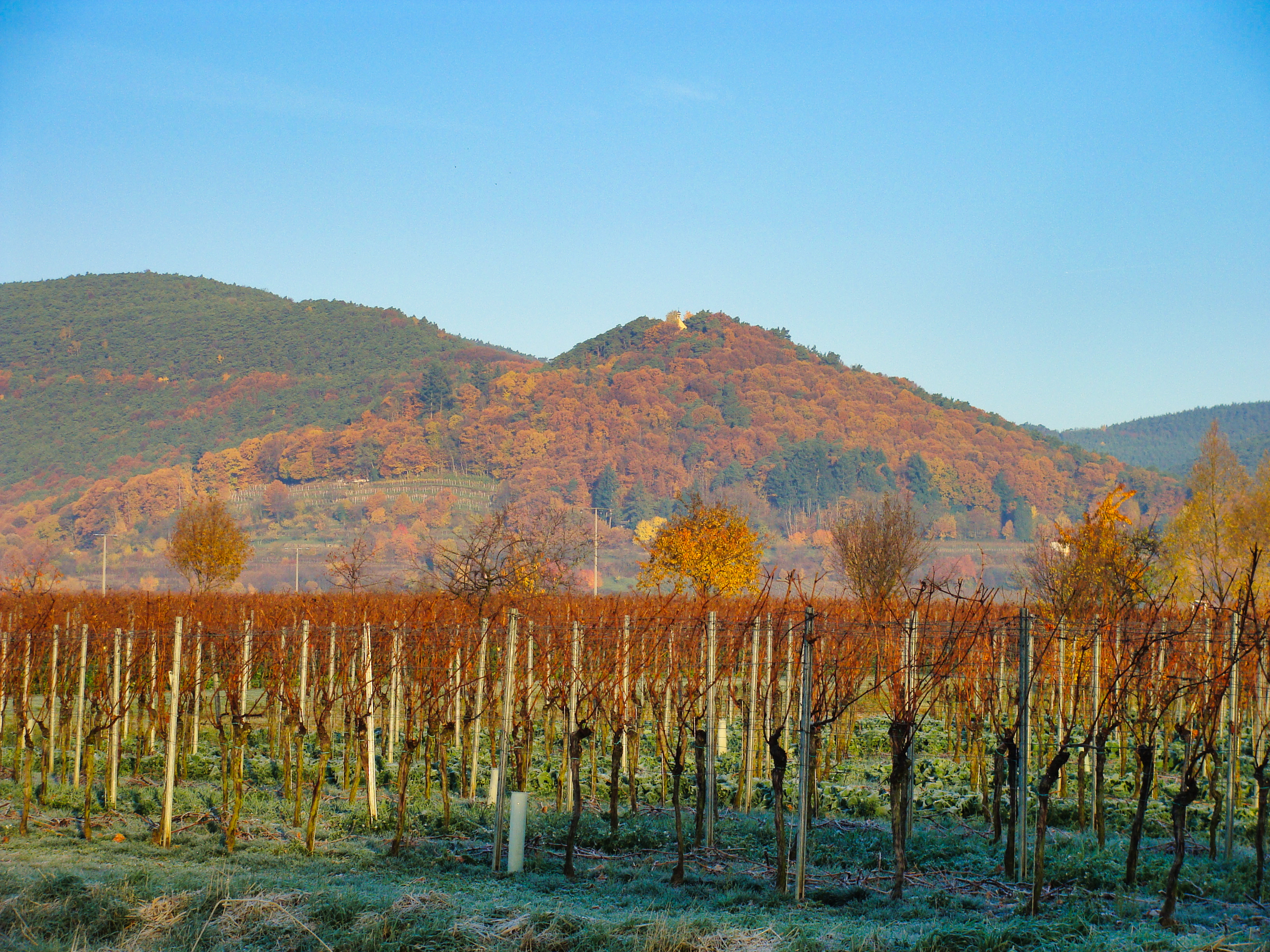
The Wetterkreuzberg and Maria Schutz Chapel

The Kleine Kalmit ("Little Kalmit"), which is only 270.5 m high and is designated as a nature reserve lies just outside the Palatine Forest and is about 15 kilometres (9.3 miles) to the south.

=== Natural region grouping ===
The Kalmit belongs to the natural region known as the Palatine Forest which, in the system published by Emil Meynen and Josef Schmithüsen in their Handbook of the Natural Region Divisions of Germany and its successor publications is classified as a major region of the 3rd order. Within the internal classification of the natural region, it belongs to the Central Palatine Forest and the mountain range of the Haardt, which forms the boundary of the Palatine Forest with the Upper Rhine Plain.

In summary the natural regional classification of the Kalmit is as follows:

1. Primary natural region: Scarpland either side of the Upper Rhine Graben
2. Secondary natural region: Palatine-Saarland Scarplands
3. Tertiary natural region: Palatine Forest
4. 4th order region (major unit): Central Palatine Forest
5. 5th order region: Haardt

== Summit ==
=== Infrastructure ===
On the summit is the Kalmithaus, a hut managed by the Palatine Forest Club mainly at weekends and public holidays. There is also a weather station and a free-standing, steel-framed radio tower, the Kalmit Transmitter (Sender Kalmit).

=== Viewing tower ===
==== Panorama ====
After the 1868 viewing tower on the exposed summit had collapsed, in 1928/29 a new 21-metre-high observation tower was built by the Palatine Forest Club, which, from the outset was fitted with living accommodation, electric light and running water. From this tower there was a comprehensive panoramic view that not only took in the entire Palatine Forest and the Vosges to the south, but also, on clear days, the ranges of the Hunsrück, Taunus, Odenwald and Black Forest. According to contemporary sources, the Kalmit was thus "the most beautiful viewing mountain in the Palatinate". Since then, in and around the tower, various survey and radio-technical facilities have been added so that it was periodically and then generally placed out of bounds to the public.

==== Transmitter station ====
The Kalmit Transmitter is used to broadcast the RPR1 103.6 MHz and BigFM 106.7 MHz radio stations. Amateur radio hams also use the height and location of the Kalmit. A branch of the German Amateur Radio Club, Ortsverband Z22, erected a relay station on the summit with the call sign, DB0XK, which was authorized on 30 November 1971 by the present-day Federal Network Agency with a frequency of 145.700 MHz. The amateur radio relay is housed in the tower next to the Kalmithaus.

==== Visibility measuring station ====
Since 2012 there has been a special facility on the Kalmit for measuring visibility; its task is to record visibility in the Palatine Forest-North Vosges Biosphere Reserve. Whilst at many, unmanned, weather stations, visibility measurements are made automatically for the range 0 to 10 km which is relevant to traffic safety, the measurement station on the Kalmit is designed for the range 10 to 390 km, which is relevant in assessing the fine dust content of the air. Measurements and survey photographs are obtainable through the "Fern-Sehen Project" (Projekt Fern-Sehen) in the Palatine Forest, which is managed by the House of Sustainability in Johanniskreuz, a department of the Rhineland-Palatinate State Forestry Commission. Another feature is that the values were introduced to alert nature lovers, because exceptional visibility is very rare and difficult to forecast.

=== Views ===
The summit has a good view of the Rhine Plain, over 500 m below, as well as the nearby villages of Maikammer and St. Martin. There are views of the cities of Ludwigshafen, Mannheim on the plain and also of Speyer and Philippsburg. In the far distance, the southwestern part of the Odenwald forest near Heidelberg and the first foothills of the northern Black Forest may be made out.

Schwetzingen Castle, 36 kilometres away, is exactly west-southwest of the Kalmit.

To the north-northwest, also 36 kilometres distant, is the highest summit in the Palatinate, the 686.5 m high Donnersberg in the North Palatine Uplands.

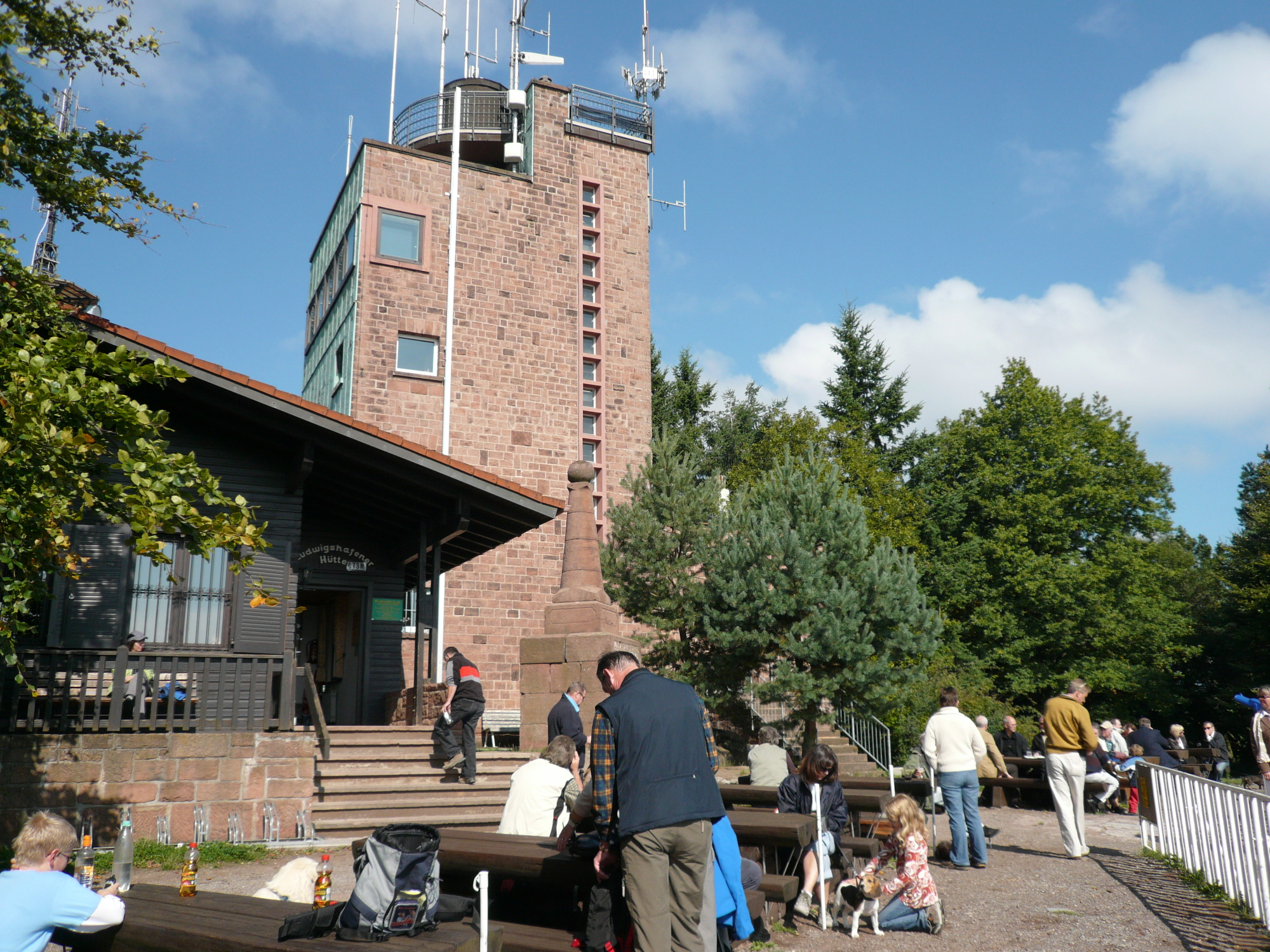
The Kalmithaus (left) and weather station

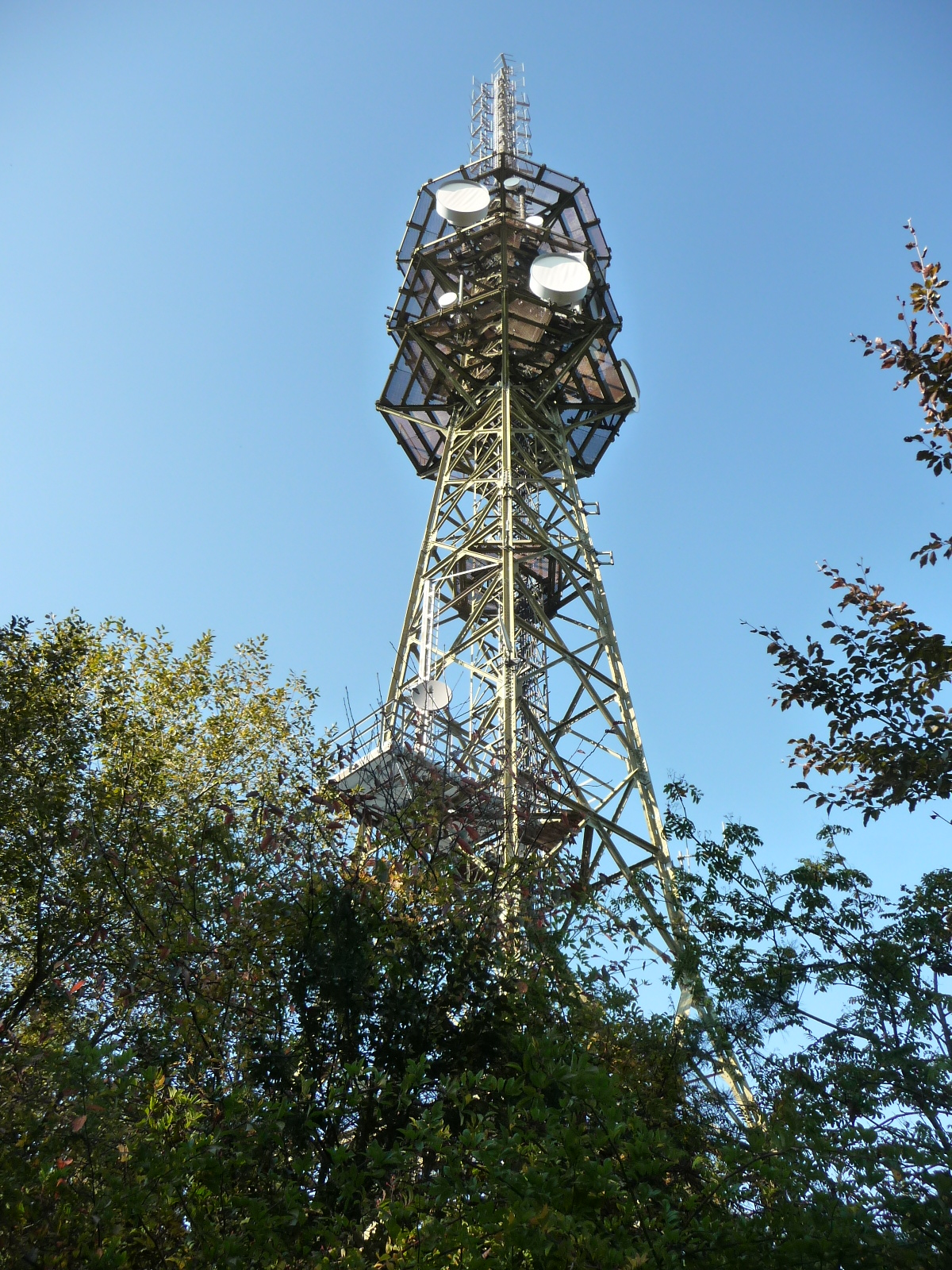
Kalmit Transmitter

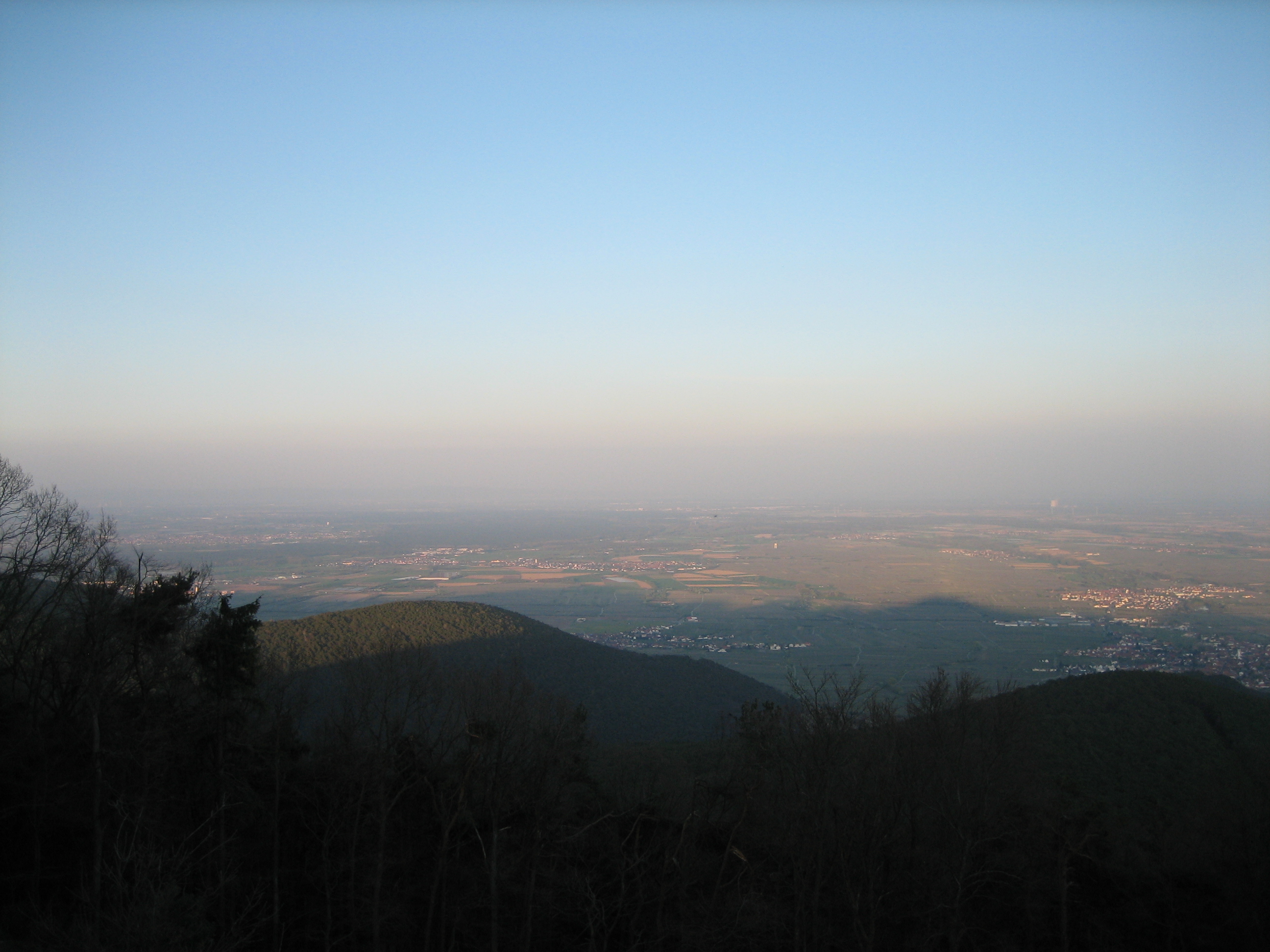
View looking east

== Hüttenberg Felsenmeer ==
On the Kalmit's subpeak, the Hüttenberg, is the Hüttenberg Felsenmeer. Here, large pieces of rock from the Middle Bunter, the so-called Karlstal beds, lie on the surface. These blocks were formed during the various ice ages, but frost action has broken down the once uniform layer of rock into a felsenmeer or blockfield.

== Sport ==
=== General ===
The steeply climbing Kalmitstraße road is also used for sporting events like mountain running competitions and road bicycle racing. Since Mai 2008 a so-called Stoppomat, an automatic timer, has been available for the use of sports cyclists, runners and skaters; the starting apparatus is at the western exit of Maikammer village (about 170 m), the finish apparatus at the Kalmit car park just below the summit, 5.75 kilometres away.

On 23 and 24 August 2009 the endurance athlete, Christoph Fuhrbach, ran 488 kilometres (303 miles) on the Kalmitstraße within 24 hours, climbing a total of 17,615 metres in height. He ran the just under 6 kilometre-long stretch between Maikammer and the Kalmit car park 42 times there and back; on the 43rd ascent he reached the 400 metre sign at the 24‑hour point. Fuhrbach thus beat the hitherto best German performance by Rainer Klaus, who climbed 15,458 metres in height in 1996.

The Felsenmeer on the Hüttenberg is a well-known bouldering area.

=== Regular sporting events ===
- The Kalmit Folding Bicycle Cup has been held here since 1991. Only folding bikes without gears are allowed. The competition takes place on the first Saturday in September.
- The Kalmit Mountain Run (Kalmit-Berglauf), which has taken place since 1992, happens in November and is the seventh and final run of the year in the Palatinate for the Palatine Mountain Running Cup (Pfälzer Berglaufpokal). Over 600 runners regularly participate in this mountain run. The route is 8,100 metres long and climbs 505 accumulated metres in height; at 2,800 and 6,200 metres there are intermediate ratings.
- Since 2006 the cycle route of the Mußbach Triathlon, a competition for the BASF Rhine-Neckar Triathlon Cup, has started at Neustadt, ascended the Kalmit and then descended again to Maikammer.

=== Walking routes ===
The Kalmit is a waypoint on several circular walks as well as the following long distance paths in the Palatine Forest:

- a footpath signed with red dots runs from Neustadt Central Station over the Hohe Loog, or alternatively from St. Martin via the Wolselquelle and Felsenmeer, each taking about 1½ hours and climbing through a height of around 500 m.
- the footpath waymarked with white and green bars runs from Maikammer to the Kalmit.

== Transport links ==
Private cars may approach the area from the A 65 motorway (from Ludwigshafen am Rhein to Karlsruhe), leaving at the Edenkoben exit. After 3 kilometres on the B 38 federal highway to Maikammer, there are signs for the Kalmit. After another six kilometres the Kalmitstraße road runs roughly from east to west past the summit of the Kalmit to the north. On a plateau on the mountainside there is a large walker's car park which is only a few minutes walk from the summit itself.

From May to October, the local public transport services operate a "walkers' bus" (Wanderbuslinie) from Neustadt (Weinstraße) Central Station to the Kalmit. The journey time is about 35 minutes; these buses are shown on the local rail service timetable. Special tickets, such as the Rhineland-Palatinate Ticket (Rheinland-Pfalz-Ticket) are accepted on these buses.
