= Taubenkopf (Haardt) =

Hill in Rhineland-Palatinate, Germany

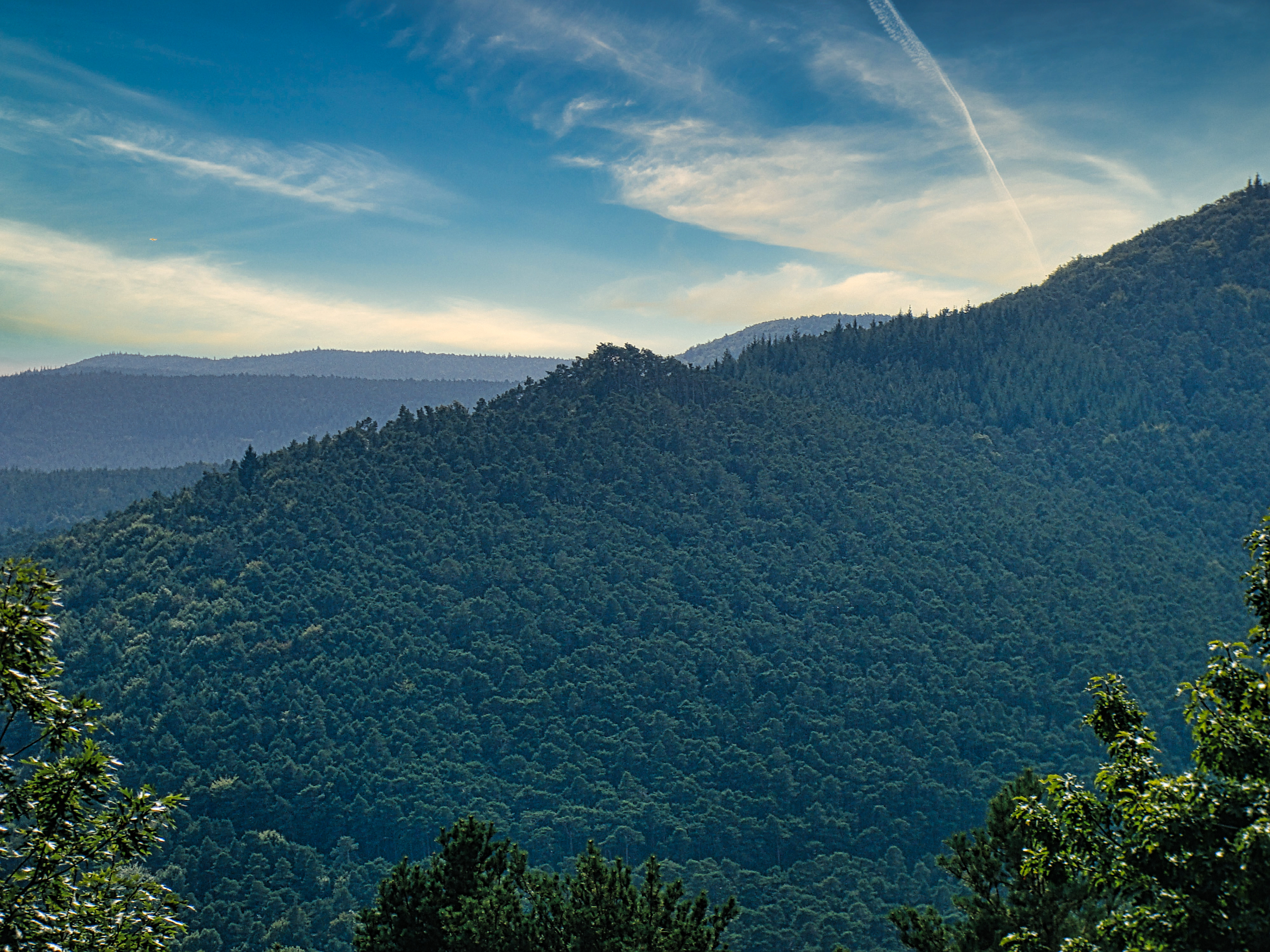

Highest point
- Elevation: 603.8 m above sea level (NHN),
- Coordinates: 49°19′21″N 8°05′24″E

Geography
- Location within Rhineland-Palatinate
- Location: Diedesfeld
- Parent range: Palatine Forest (Rhineland-Palatinate, Germany)

The Taubenkopf is a hill, 603.8 m above sea level (NHN), in the German state of Rhineland-Palatinate. It is part of the mountain chain of the Haardt in the Palatine Forest and lies in the municipal territory of Diedesfeld in the borough of Neustadt an der Weinstraße.

== Geography ==
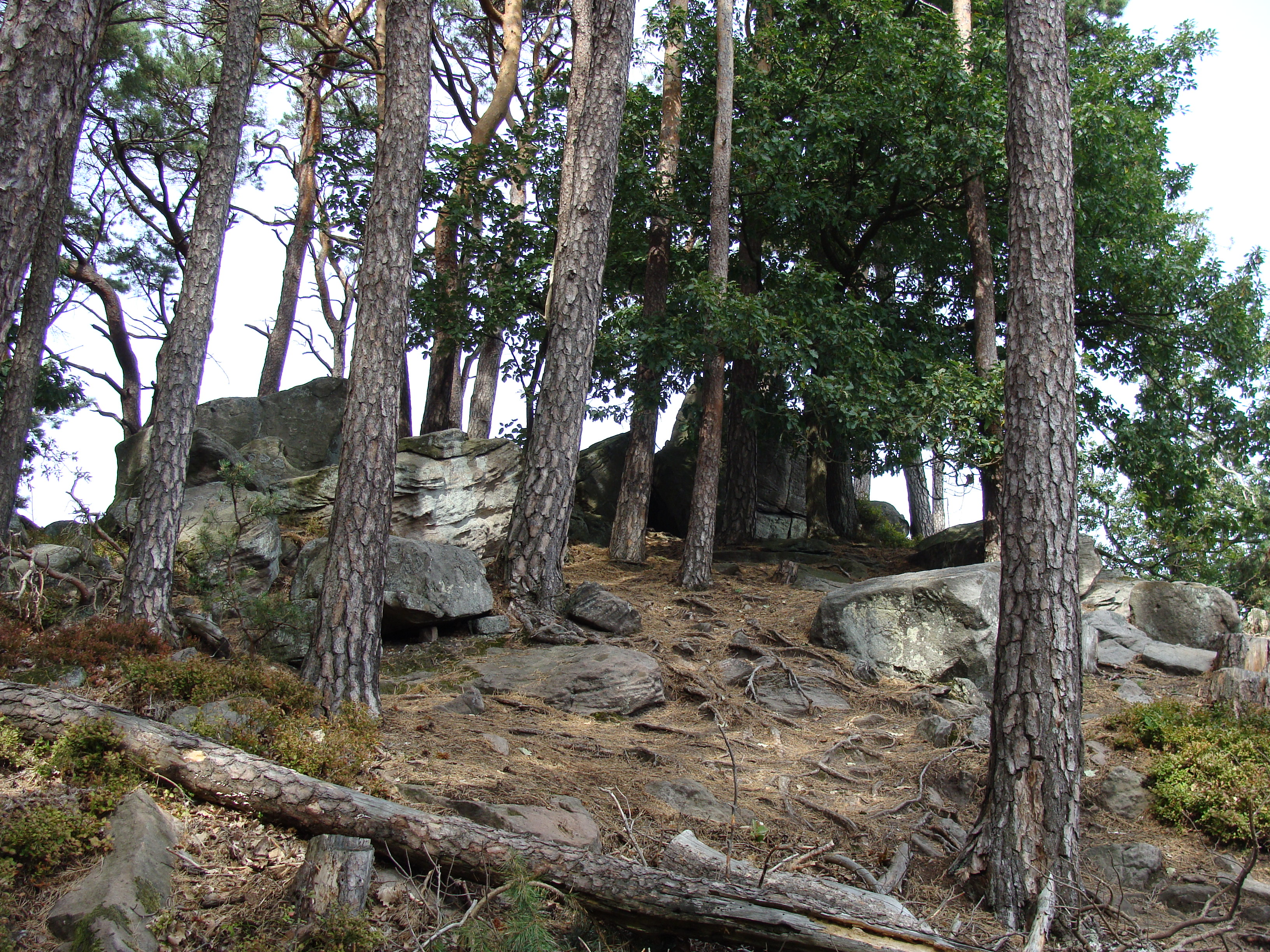
Summit of the Taubenkopf

The Taubenkopf, like the hills of Breitenberg (545.2 m), Wetterkreuzberg (400.7 m), Hüttenberg (591.2 m) and the Kanzel (531.7 m), is one of the outlying peaks on the Kalmit massif (672.6 m). Its summit lies 100 metres (110 yd) from the Kalmitstraße road (L515) and ca. 500 metres (550 yd) northeast of the summit of the Kalmit itself, the highest peak in the Palatine Forest region. Before storm damage and the subsequent removal of wood, the summit dome was in the shape of a dove's head (Taubenkopf). Following the deforestation there is a 270 degree outlook from west (into the Palatine Forest) through north (Hohe Loog) to east (Klausental, Sommerberg and the Rhine Plain). Few hilltops of this height so close to the Rhine Plain have been cleared of trees.

== Tourism ==
The Taubenkopf is an important hub for several walking routes, which converge 20 metres in height below the summit. These are the blue and white waymarked path from the Totenkopf via the Hahnenschritt, the white and green main trail from Maikammer and the unmarked Klausental to Diedesfeld footpath (the Hinkelstein Path).

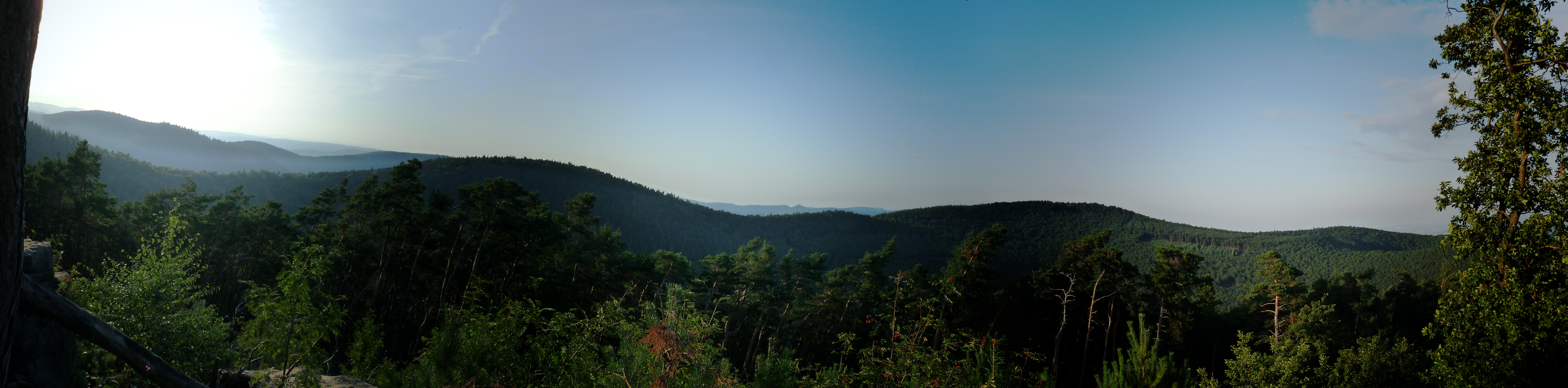
The panorama from the Taubenkopf
