= Hohe Loog (Haardt) =

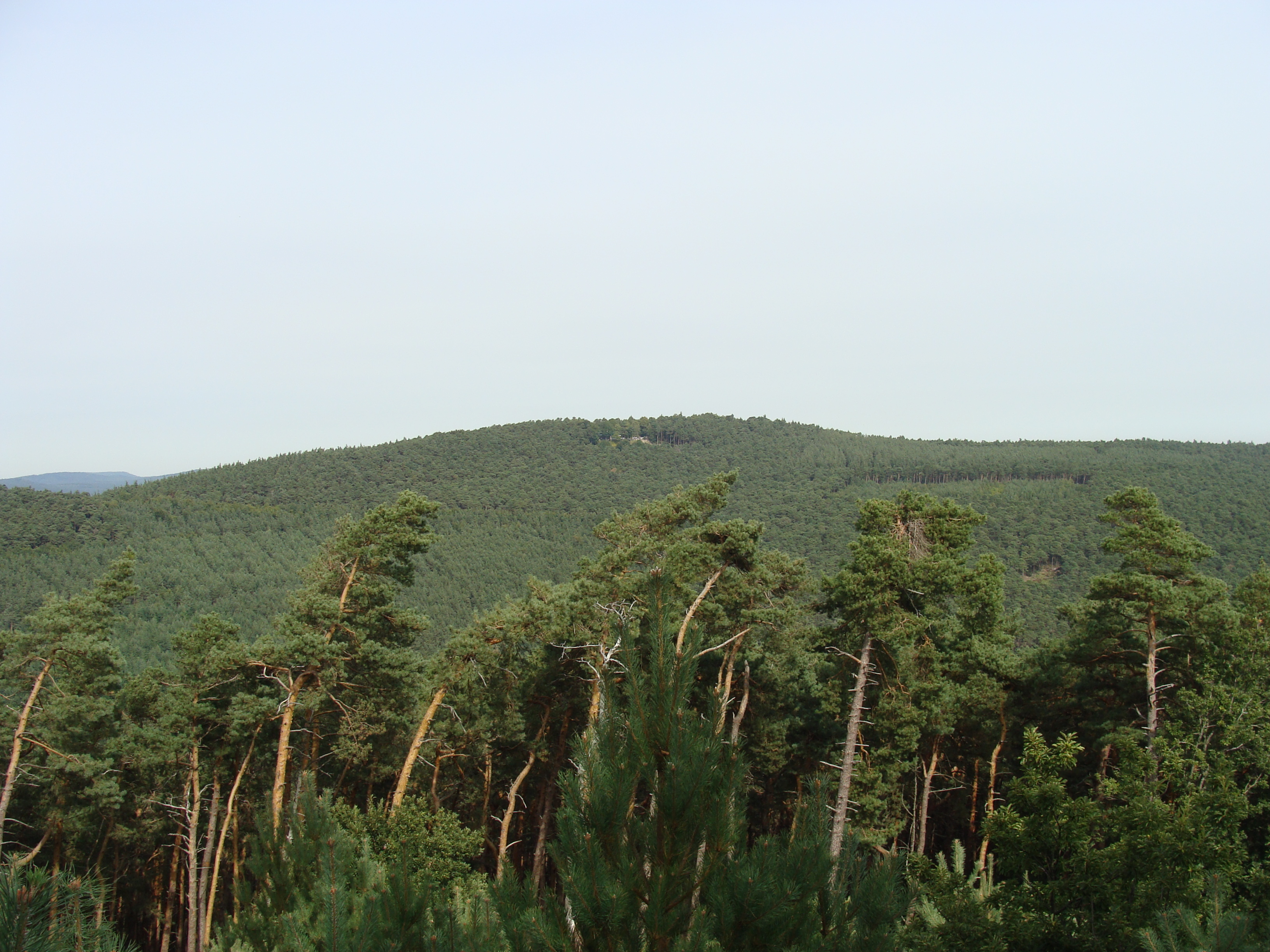

Highest point
- Elevation: 619 m above sea level (NN) (2,031 ft)
- Coordinates: 49°20′01″N 8°05′48″E

Geography
- Location within Rhineland-Palatinate
- Location: Neustadt an der Weinstraße
- Parent range: Haardt (Palatinate), Palatine Forest

The Hohe Loog is a mountain, 619 m above sea level (NN), in the Haardt, the eastern rim of the Palatine Forest in Germany. The mountain lies within the borough of Neustadt an der Weinstraße in the southern part of the state of Rhineland-Palatinate.

== Location ==
The Hohe Loog lies west of Neustadt an der Weinstraße and 1.7 km northeast of the Kalmit, the highest mountain in the Haardt. Its name is derived from Loog ("border sign"). On its entirely wooded summit are several sandstone rock outcrops, but the tree cover means that no views of the surrounding area are possible from here. To the east of the summit is a flat area, almost 2 square kilometres in area, called the Hohe-Loog-Ebene ("Hohe Loog Plain") at a height of about 580 m above NN. The Hohe Loog has a northeastern outlier, the Rutschsteinberg. Its southeastern counterpart is the Rittersberg, with its conciliation cross (Sühnekreuz); the Rittersberg in turn leads to the Schlossberg, the hill on which Hambach Castle stands. To the north the Hohe Loog drops into the valley of Kaltenbrunnertal. Near the summit is the Hohe Loog House, managed by the Palatine Forest Club, which has an outstanding view of the Kalmit massif and the Rhine Valley.

== Routes to the summit ==
The Hohe Loog may be climbed on several signed trails established by the Palatine Forest Club. From Neustadt the route runs along the Kaltenbrunner Tal or via the Nollenkopf. The mountain is also accessible from Diedesfeld via Hambach Castle and the Rittersberg. Another ascent is possible through the Klausental valley from Maikammer. The shortest route to the summit runs from the hiker's car park on the Hahnenschritt saddle below the Kalmit.

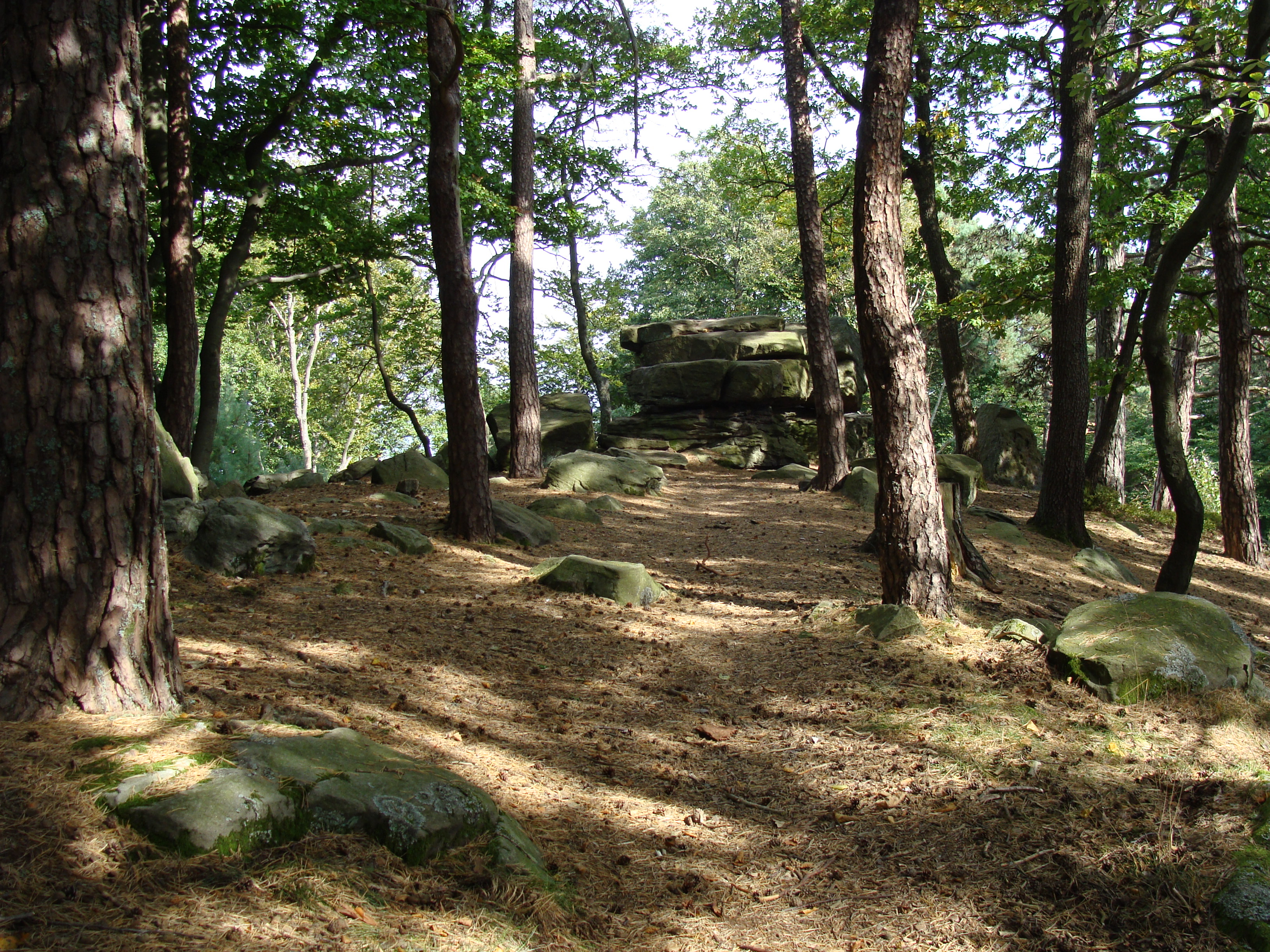
The summit

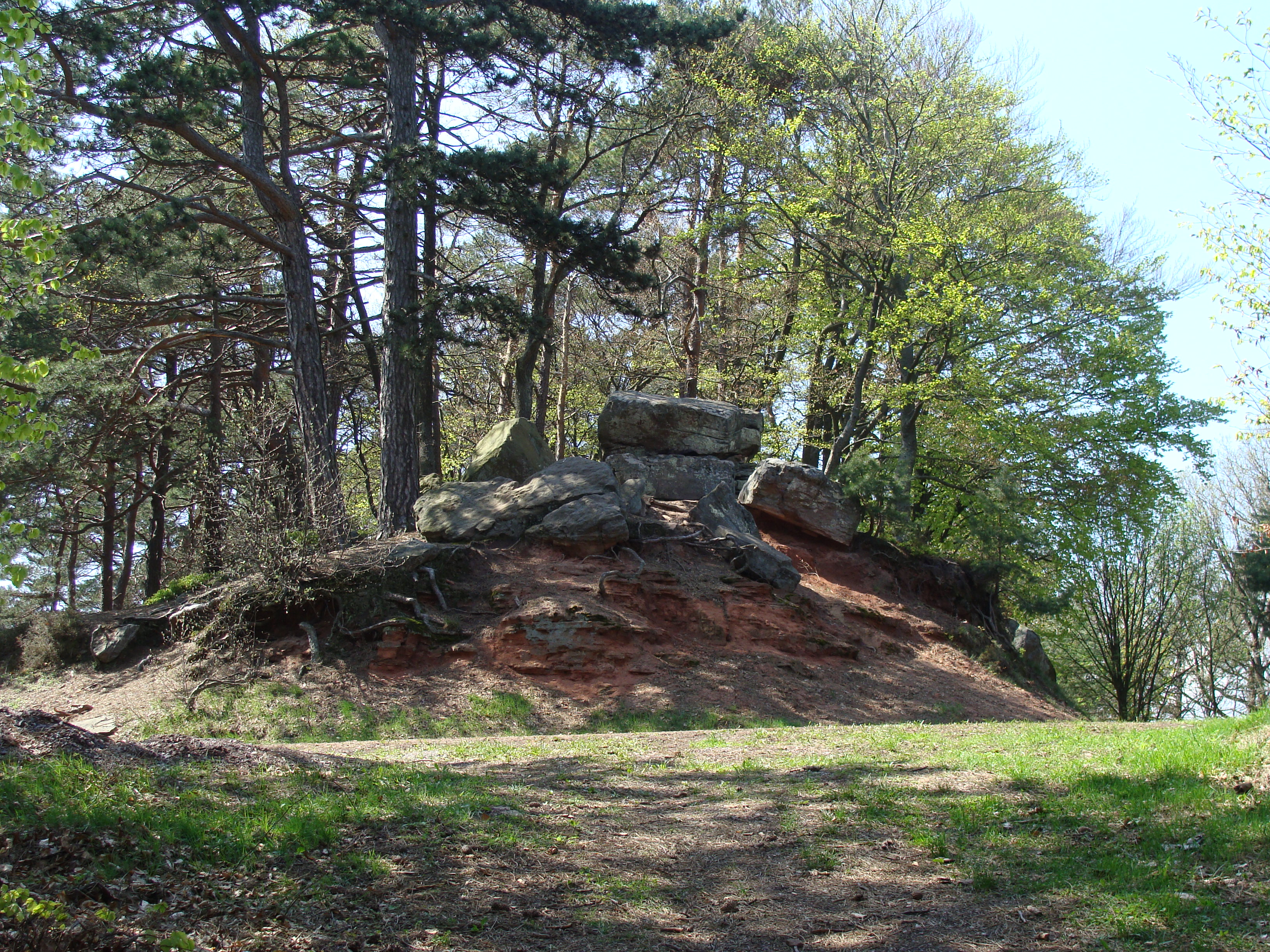
The summit

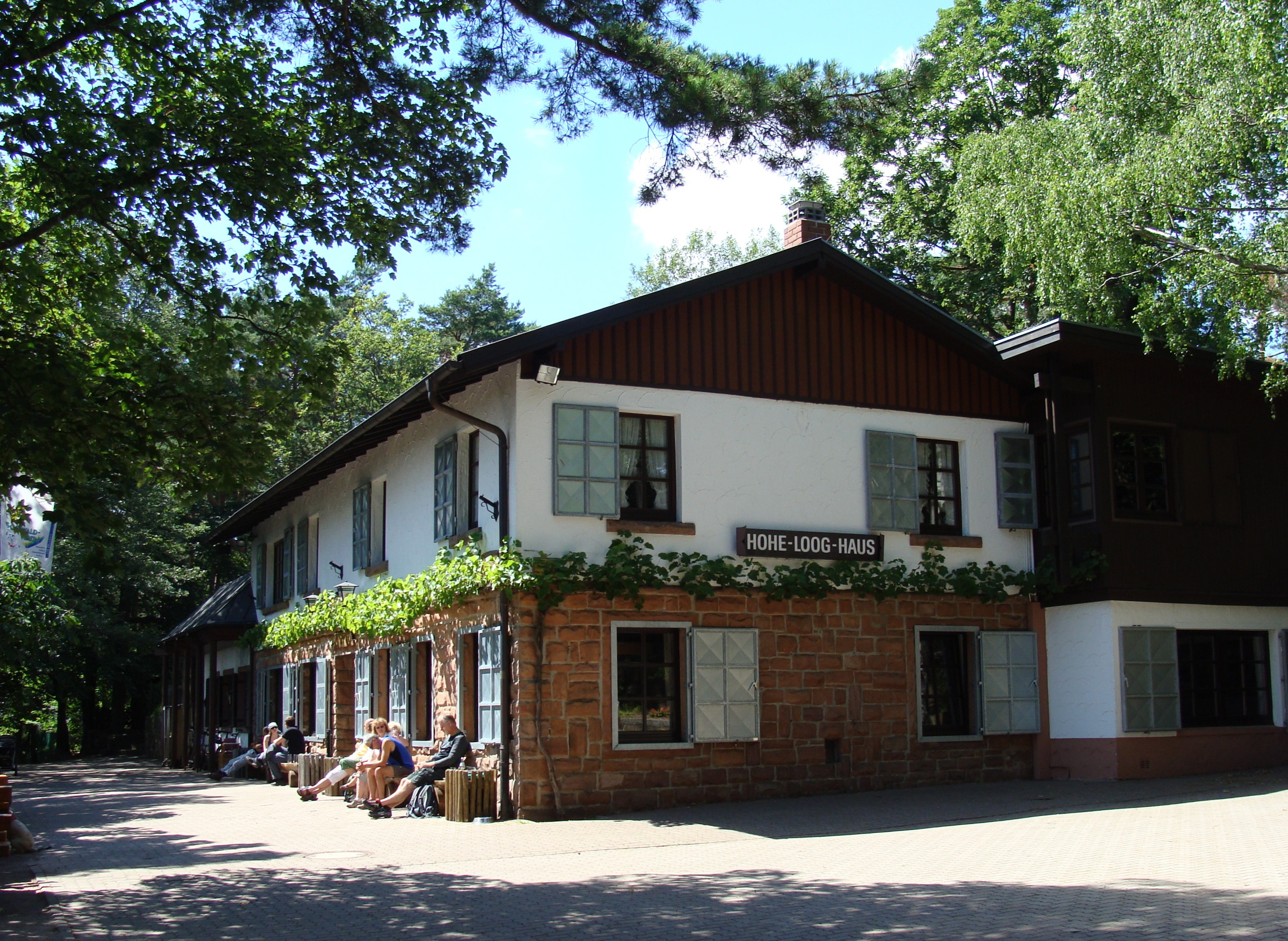
The Hohe Loog House

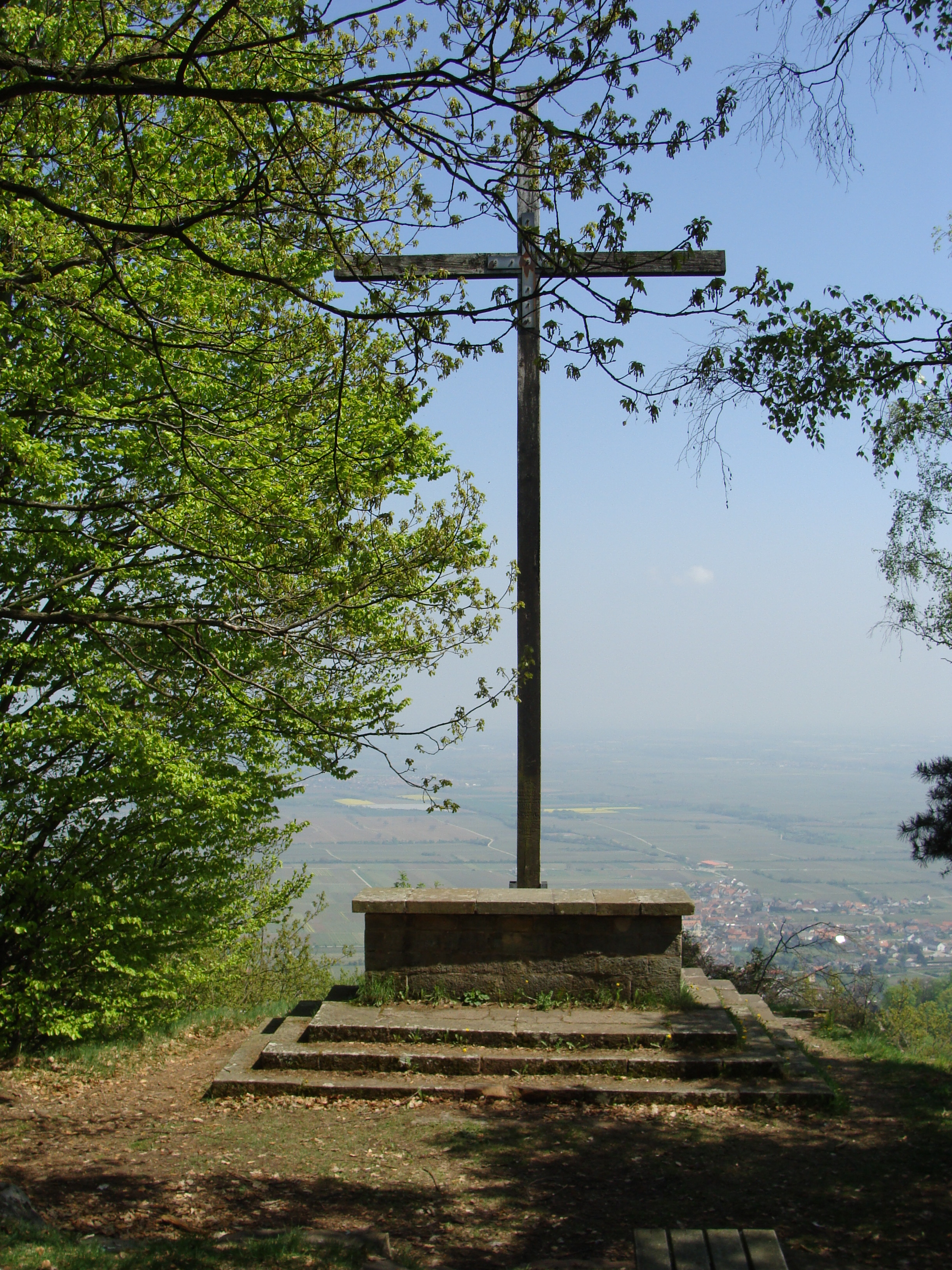
The conciliation cross on the Rittersberg

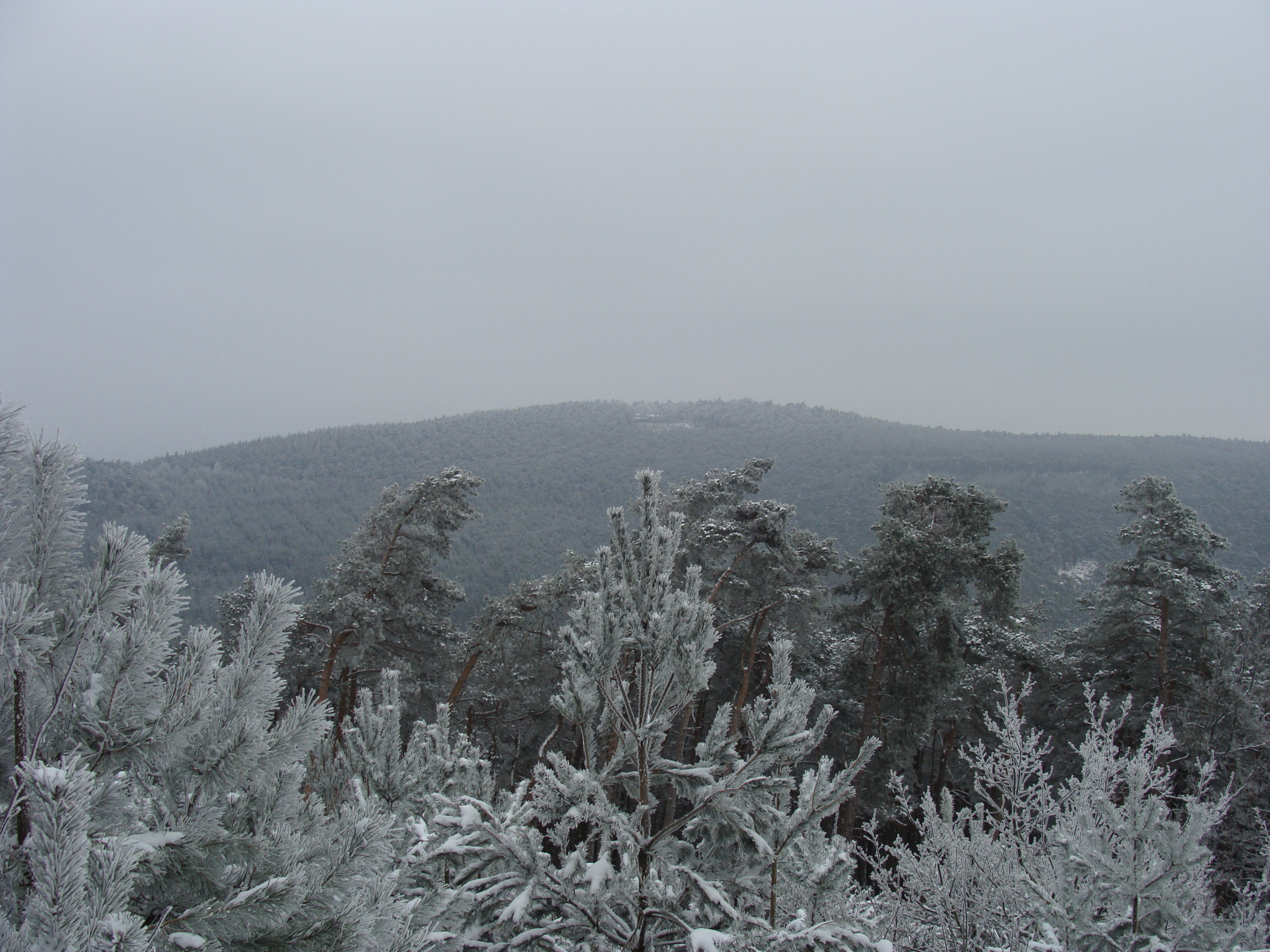
The Hohe Loog seen from the Taubenkopf (Haardt)

== See also ==
- Bergstein (Hohe Loog), a rock formation and natural monument on the Hohe Loog massif
