= Sankt Martin, Germany =

Sankt Martin
- Municipality
- Coat of arms

- Location of Sankt Martin within Südliche Weinstraße district
- Interactive map of Sankt Martin
- Location within Germany Location within Rhineland-Palatinate
- Coordinates: 49°18′03″N 8°06′12″E
- Country: Germany
- State: Rhineland-Palatinate
- District: Südliche Weinstraße
- Municipal assoc.: Maikammer

Government
  - Mayor (2019–24): Timo Glaser (CDU)

Area
  - Total: 11.2 km^{2} (4.3 sq mi)
- Elevation: 225 m (738 ft)

Population (2025-12-31)
  - Total: 1,651
  - Density: 147/km^{2} (382/sq mi)
- Time zone: UTC+01:00 (CET)
  - Summer (DST): UTC+02:00 (CEST)
- Postal codes: 67487
- Dialling codes: 06323
- Vehicle registration: SÜW
- Website: www.sankt-martin.de

Sankt Martin (German pronunciation: [zaŋkt ˈmaʁtiːn]) is a municipality in Südliche Weinstraße district, in Rhineland-Palatinate, Germany.

== Buildings ==
The medieval center is worth seeing and is since 1980 under Cultural heritage management. St. Martin, Martin of Tours, is also the patron of Catholic parish church of St. Martin. In addition to a Late Gothic net vault in choir, there are other art treasures of Gothic sculpture, such as the tomb of Hanns von Dalberg († 1531) and his wife Catherine von Cronberg (UNESCO - plaque).
