= Ulrich =

Ulrich (German pronunciation: [ˈʊl.ʁɪç]) is a Germanic given name derived from Old High German Uodalrich, Odalric. It is composed of the elements uodal- meaning "heritage" and -rih meaning "king, ruler". Attested from the 8th century as the name of Alamannic nobility, the name is popularly given from the high medieval period in reference to Saint Ulrich of Augsburg (canonized 993).

Ulrich is also a surname. It is most prevalent in Germany and has the highest density in Switzerland. This last name was found in the United States in the year 1727 when Christof Ulrich landed in Pennsylvania. Most Americans with the last name were concentrated in Pennsylvania, which was home to many German immigrant communities. Nowadays in the United States, the name is distributed largely in the Pennsylvania-Ohio region.

== History ==
Documents record the Old High German name Oadalrich or Uodalrich from the later 8th century in Alamannia. The related name Adalric (Anglo-Saxon cognate Æthelric) is attested from the 6th century (Athalaric King of the Ostrogoths; Æthelric of Bernicia). The name of Agilolfing duke Odilo (fl. 709–748) may represent a short form of the name.

Count Udalrich I (fl. 778–814), a son of Gerold of Anglachgau, founded the Alamannic Udalriching dynasty, ancestral to the counts of Bregenz. The given name occurred frequently in the Alamannic Hunfriding dynasty in the 9th to 10th centuries; examples include Odalric, Count of Barcelona (fl. 850s) and Odalric, Count of Thurgau (fl. 920s). The name is recorded in an Icelandic form as Óðalríkr only in the later medieval period.

In the Middle High German period, the name generally commemorated Saint Ulrich, Bishop of Augsburg (c. 890 – 4 July 973), who twice defended Augsburg from attacks by Magyars.

The Swiss Reformer Ulrich Zwingli etymologized his given name as Huldrych (Huldricus, Huldaricus), i.e. "rich in grace". In the wake of Zwingli, during the 16th century and well into the 18th century, it became a fashion - especially for Protestant writers - to Latinise the given name Ulrich as Huldricus.

The name was popularly given in 20th-century Switzerland, especially from the 1940s to the 1960s, peaking at rank 16 in 1947, but dropping below rank 100 in 1972. In Czechoslovakia, Oldřich was popularly given in the 1940s to 1950s, peaking at rank 18 during 1946–1951.

== Variants ==
The Germanic given name was adopted in Czech and Slovak as Oldřich and Oldrich, respectively, and in Scandinavian languages as Ulrik, in Slovenian as Urh, in Polish as Ulryk[pl], in Latvian as Uldis.

Common German hypocoristics are Uli or Ulli (Swiss Ueli) and historically Utz. Czech/Slovak hypocorisms are Olda, Oldík, and Volek, and a Polish one Ryczek.

Feminine forms Ulrikke and Ulrika have been recorded from the early modern period. A Czech form is Oldřiška.

In Italian, there are also many forms, as surnames, such as Orrico, D'Orrico, D'oricchio, Ulrico, Urrico, Orrigo, Origo, Orrigoni, Orrici, and Ulrici.

== People with the given name ==
=== Medieval to early modern ===
Ordered chronologically

- Udalrich I, count in Alamannia (fl. 778–814), son of Gerold of Anglachgau
- Udalrich II, son of Udalrich I, count in Alamannia (fl. 800/803)
- Ulrich of Augsburg (c. 890–973), bishop and saint
- Ulric Manfred II of Turin (died 1034), Count of Turin and Margrave of Susa
- Ulric I of Carniola (died 1070), the Margrave of Carniola and Carinthia
- Ulric II of Carniola (died 1112), the Margrave of Istria
- Ulrich I, Bishop of Passau (c. 1027–1121)
- Ulrich of Zell (1029–1093), abbot and saint
- Ulrich I Bishop of Eichstätt (r. 1075–1099)
- Ulrich of Bamberg (fl. 1100), priest and chronicler
- Ulrich II von Bogen, Bishop of Eichstätt (r. 1112–1125)
- Oldřich of Olomouc (died 1177), duke in Bohemia
- Ulrich von Zatzikhoven, late 12th century author of the Arthurian romance Lanzelet
- Ulrich II (bishop of Passau) (died 1221)
- Ulrich von Liechtenstein (1200–1275), medieval writer, poet and knight
- Ulrich III, Duke of Carinthia (c. 1220–1269)
- Ulrich II, Count of Württemberg (c. 1254–1279)
- Ulrich III, Count of Württemberg (after 1286–1392)
- Ulrich II von Graben (before 1300–c. 1361), Austrian nobleman
- Ulrich III, Lord of Hanau (c. 1310–1369 or 1370)
- Ulrich IV, Count of Württemberg (after 1315–1366)
- Ulrich von Jungingen (1360–1410), 26th Grand Master of the Teutonic Knights
- Ulrich II, Count of Celje (1406–1456)
- Ulrich I, Count of East Frisia (1408–1466)
- Ulrich III von Nussdorf, Bishop of Passau (r. 1451–1479)
- Ulrich V, Count of Württemberg (1413–1480)
- Ulrich II, Duke of Mecklenburg-Stargard (probably before 1428–1471)
- Ulrich Fugger the Elder (1441–1510), German businessman and member of the Fugger family
- Ulrich Rülein von Calw (1465–1523), mayor of Freiberg, Saxony
- Ulrich of Hardegg (after 1483–1535), Count of Hardegg
- Ulrich Zwingli (1484–1535), leader of the Reformation in Switzerland
- Ulrich, Duke of Württemberg (1487–1550)
- Ulrich von Hutten (1488–1523), German knight, scholar, poet and reformer during the Knights' War
- Ulrich Hugwald (1496–1571), Swiss reformer
- Ulrich, Duke of Mecklenburg (1527–1603)
- Ulrik of Denmark (1578–1624), administrator of the Prince-Bishopric of Schwerin
- Ulrich, Duke of Pomerania (1589–1622)
- Ulrik of Denmark (1611–1633), administrator of the Prince-Bishopric of Schwerin
- Ulrich Grappler von Trappenburg, Bishop of Passau (r. 1646–1658)

=== Late modern era ===
- Ulrich, 10th Prince Kinsky of Wchinitz and Tettau (1893–1938), titular pretender
- Ulrich Braukmann (born 1959), German economics professor
- Ulrich Daldrup (born 1947), German scientist and mayor of Aachen
- Ulrich Eberl (born 1962), German science and technology journalist
- Ulrich Ellis (1904–1981), Australian writer
- Ulrich Graf (1878–1950), member of Hitler's inner circle
- Ulrich Herbert (born 1951), German historian
- Ulrich Leyendecker (1946–2018), German composer of contemporary classical music
- Ulrich Marida, Central African Republic basketball coach
- Ulrich Matthes (born 1959), German actor
- Ueli Maurer (born 1950), Swiss politician
- Ulrich Mühe (1953–2007), German actor and director
- Ulrich Noethen (born 1959), German actor
- Ulrich Ochsenbein (1811–1890), Swiss politician
- Ulrich Salchow (1877–1949), German figure skater and inventor of the salchow jump
- Ulrich Schindel (1935–2025), German classical philologist
- Ulrich Schmid-Maybach, philanthropist, real estate developer and entrepreneur
- Ulrich Schnauss (born 1977), German musician
- Ulrich Wilhelm Graf Schwerin von Schwanenfeld (1902–1944), a key conspirator in the failed 20 July plot to assassinate Hitler in 1944
- Ulrich Siegmund (born 1990), German politician
- Ulrich Steinhilper (1918–2009), World War II Luftwaffe ace credited by some with the concept of word processing
- Ulrich Thoden (born 1973), German politician
- Ulrich von Wilamowitz-Moellendorff (1848–1931), German classical philologist
- Ulrich Wild (born 1969), American record producer
- Ulrich Friedrich Wilhelm Joachim von Ribbentrop (1893–1946), more commonly known as Joachim von Ribbentrop, Foreign Minister of Nazi Germany
- Ulrich Frédéric Woldemar, Comte de Lowendal (1700–1755), German-born French soldier and statesmen

== People with the surname ==
- Alexander Ulrich (born 1971), German politician
- Anne Ulrich (born 1966), German biochemist
- Barbara Ulrich (born 1945), Canadian actress and filmmaker
- Benjamin Ulrich (born 1988), German rugby union international
- Bob Ulrich (born 1944), American businessman
- Bob Ulrich (mayor) (born 1933), American politician
- Brian Ulrich (born 1971), American photographer
- Bror Ludvig Ulrich (1818–1887), Swedish military and colonial governor
- Carl Ulrich (1853–1933), German politician
- Caroline Ulrich (born 2002), Swiss ski mountaineer
- Carolyn F. Ulrich (1881–1969), American librarian
- Celeste Ulrich (1924–2011), American educator
- Charles Frederic Ulrich (1858–1908), American painter
- Christian Ulrich (1836–1909), Austrian architect
- Christin Ulrich (born 1990), German weightlifter
- Chuck Ulrich (1929–2006), American football player
- Cornelia Ulrich (born 1967), German-American epidemiologist
- Curt von Ulrich (1876–1946), German politician
- D. K. Ulrich (born 1944), American race car driver/owner
- Dario Ulrich (born 1998), Swiss footballer
- Dave Ulrich (born 1953), American academic and speaker
- Dieter Ulrich (born 1958), Swiss musician and historian
- Donald Ulrich aka Don Rich (1941–1974) American country music musician
- Dutch Ulrich (1899–1929), American baseball player
- Edward Oscar Ulrich (1857–1944), American invertebrate paleontologist
- Einer Ulrich (1896-1969), Danish tennis player
- Emilie Ulrich (1872-1952), Danish soprano
- Eric Ulrich (born 1985), American politician from New York City
- Erika Ulrich (born 1943), Swiss archer
- Eugene Ulrich (born 1938), American Dead Sea Scrolls scholar
- Ferdinand Ulrich (1931–2020), German philosopher and professor
- Fernando Ulrich (born 1952), Portuguese economist and banking administrator
- Fredrik Carl Ulrich (1808–1868), Swedish colonial governor
- Friedrich-Wilhelm Ulrich (born 1953), East German rower
- George Ulrich (American geologist) (born 1934), American geologist and volcanologist
- George Ulrich (baseball) (1869–1918), American baseball player
- George Henry Frederick Ulrich (1830–1900), New Zealand mineralogist and academic
- Günther Ulrich (born 1936), Austrian fencer
- Hans Herbert Ulrich (1886–1971), German film producer
- Henry G. Ulrich III, United States Navy admiral who retired in 2007
- Herbert Ulrich (1921–2002), Austrian ice hockey player
- Hermiene Ulrich (1885–1956), Australian academic
- Hub Ulrich (1920–1974), American football player
- Hugo Ulrich (1827–1872), German composer and educator
- Jack Ulrich (1890–1927), Canadian ice hockey player
- Jakob Ulrich (1856–1906), Swiss romanist
- Jan Ullrich (born 1973), German race cyclist
- Jayden Ulrich (born 2002), American athlete
- Jennifer Ulrich (born 1984), German actress
- Jing Ulrich (born 1967), American banker
- Jochen Ulrich (1944–2012), German choreographer and dancer
- Johann Jakob Ulrich (1798–1877), Swiss painter and graphic artist
- Joe Ulrich (born 1961), American former soccer player
- John Ulrich, U.S. Army general
- Jørgen Ulrich (1935–2010), Danish tennis player
- Kim Johnston Ulrich, American actress
- Kurt Ulrich (1905–1967), German film producer
- Lars Ulrich (born 1963), Danish drummer for the heavy metal band Metallica
- Laurel Thatcher Ulrich (born 1938), American historian and writer
- Laurent Ulrich (born 1951), French Catholic archbishop
- Laurin Ulrich (born 2005), German footballer
- Lester J. Ulrich (1908–1991), American lawyer and politician
- Lisa Ullrich (1900–1986), German politician
- Ľubomír Ulrich (born 1989), Slovak footballer
- Luca Ulrich (born 2003), German-American soccer goalkeeper
- Mabel S. Ulrich (1876–1945), American medical doctor and health educator
- Madame Ulrich (born c. 1665 – died after 1707), French playwright and writer
- Marek Ulrich (born 1997), German swimmer
- Maria Ulrich (1908–1988), Portuguese educationalist
- Marshall Ulrich (born 1951), American ultramarathon runner
- Martin Ulrich (born 1969), Austrian ice hockey player
- Matt Ulrich (1981–2023), American football player
- Peter Ulrich (born 1958), British songwriter and recording artist
- Philippe Ulrich (born 1951), French composer and programmer
- Rainer Ulrich (1949–2023), German footballer
- Ray Ulrich (1898–1950), American football player
- Renato Ulrich (born 1983), Swiss freestyle skier
- Richard Ulrich (born 1942), German board game designer
- Richard Ulrich (American football), American former football coach
- Robert J. Ulrich (casting director), American casting director
- Rudolf Ulrich (1922–1997), German actor
- Rudolph Ulrich (1840–1906), German-American landscape gardener
- Shari Ulrich (born 1951), American-Canadian musician and songwriter
- Skeet Ulrich (born 1970), American actor
- Theodore Friederick Ulrich (1888–1963), Australian Army officer
- Thomas Ulrich (born 1975), German boxer
- Torben Ulrich (1928–2023), Danish writer and tennis pro
- Tracy Ulrich (born 1966), aka Tracii Guns, guitarist and musician
- Wally Ulrich (1921–1995), American golfer
- Werner Ulrich (canoeist) (born 1940), East German sprint canoer
- Werner Ulrich (born 1948), Swiss social scientist and practical philosopher
- William M. Ulrich (born ca. 1956), American management consultant
- Wolf-Christian Ulrich (born 1975), German TV journalist, host and correspondent

== Fictional characters ==
- Ulrich Stern, on the French animated TV series Code Lyoko
- Ulrich von Bek, the hero of The War Hound and the World's Pain and other novels by Michael Moorcock

== See also ==
- Ulric (disambiguation)
- Huldreich (disambiguation)
