= List of The New York Times number-one books of 1932 =

This is a list of books that topped The New York Times best-seller list in 1932. When the list began in 1931 through 1941 it only reflected sales in the New York City area.

== Fiction ==
The following list ranks the number-one best-selling fiction books.

The two most popular books that year were The Fountain, by Charles Langbridge Morgan, which held on top of the list for 10 weeks, and Mary's Neck by Booth Tarkington, which was on top of the list for 7 weeks.

Date	Book	Author
January 4	Maid in Waiting	John Galsworthy
January 11	The Harbourmaster	William McFee
January 18	The Harbourmaster	William McFee
January 25	Mr. and Mrs. Pennington	Francis Brett Young
February 1	Mr. and Mrs. Pennington	Francis Brett Young
February 8	The End of Desire	Robert Herrick
February 15	Mary's Neck	Booth Tarkington
February 22	Mary's Neck	Booth Tarkington
February 29	Mary's Neck	Booth Tarkington
March 7	Mary's Neck	Booth Tarkington
March 14	Mary's Neck	Booth Tarkington
March 21	Mary's Neck	Booth Tarkington
March 28	Mary's Neck	Booth Tarkington
April 4	Magnolia Street	Louis Golding
April 11	Magnolia Street	Louis Golding
April 18	Magnolia Street	Louis Golding
April 25	Magnolia Street	Louis Golding
May 2	Bright Skin	Julia Peterkin
May 9	A Modern Hero	Louis Bromfield
May 16	The Good Earth	Pearl S. Buck
May 23	The Good Earth	Pearl S. Buck
May 30	The Good Earth	Pearl S. Buck
June 6	District Nurse	Faith Baldwin
June 13	The Fountain	Charles Langbridge Morgan
June 20	The Fountain	Charles Langbridge Morgan
June 27	The Fountain	Charles Langbridge Morgan
July 4	The Fountain	Charles Langbridge Morgan
July 11	The Fountain	Charles Langbridge Morgan
July 18	The Fountain	Charles Langbridge Morgan
July 25	The Fountain	Charles Langbridge Morgan
August 1	The Fountain	Charles Langbridge Morgan
August 8	The Fountain	Charles Langbridge Morgan
August 15	Faraway	J. B. Priestley
August 22	Lark Ascending	Mazo De La Roche
August 29	The Fountain	Charles Langbridge Morgan
September 5	A New York Tempest	Manuel Komroff
September 12	The Sheltered Life	Ellen Glasgow
September 19	The Sheltered Life	Ellen Glasgow
September 26	The Sheltered Life	Ellen Glasgow
October 3	Sons	Pearl S. Buck
October 10	Sons	Pearl S. Buck
October 17	Sons	Pearl S. Buck
October 24	Sons	Pearl S. Buck
October 31	Sons	Pearl S. Buck
November 7	Sons	Pearl S. Buck
November 14	Invitation to the Waltz	Rosamond Lehmann
November 21	Flowering Wilderness	John Galsworthy
November 28	Flowering Wilderness	John Galsworthy
December 5	Flowering Wilderness	John Galsworthy
December 12	Flowering Wilderness	John Galsworthy
December 19	Flowering Wilderness	John Galsworthy
December 26	Flowering Wilderness	John Galsworthy

== Nonfiction ==
The following list ranks the number-one best-selling nonfiction books.

Date	Book	Author
January 4	The Epic of America	James Truslow Adams
January 11	The Epic of America	James Truslow Adams
January 18	The Epic of America	James Truslow Adams
January 25	The Epic of America	James Truslow Adams
February 1	Only Yesterday	Frederick Lewis Allen
February 8	Only Yesterday	Frederick Lewis Allen
February 15	A Fortune to Share	Vash Young
February 22	Only Yesterday	Frederick Lewis Allen
February 29	The Story of My Life	Clarence Darrow
March 7	The Story of My Life	Clarence Darrow
March 14	Once A Grand Duke	Grand Duke Alexander Mikhailovich of Russia
March 21	Only Yesterday	Frederick Lewis Allen
March 28	Only Yesterday	Frederick Lewis Allen
April 4	The Epic of America	James Truslow Adams
April 11	Only Yesterday	Frederick Lewis Allen
April 18	Recovery	Arthur Salter, 1st Baron Salter
April 25	Only Yesterday	Frederick Lewis Allen
May 2	Recovery	Arthur Salter, 1st Baron Salter
May 9	Recovery	Arthur Salter, 1st Baron Salter
May 16	Only Yesterday	Frederick Lewis Allen
May 23	Only Yesterday	Frederick Lewis Allen
May 30	20,000 Years in Sing Sing	Lewis E. Lawes
June 6	20,000 Years in Sing Sing	Lewis E. Lawes
June 13	20,000 Years in Sing Sing	Lewis E. Lawes
June 20	20,000 Years in Sing Sing	Lewis E. Lawes
June 27	20,000 Years in Sing Sing	Lewis E. Lawes
July 4	Only Yesterday	Frederick Lewis Allen
July 11	A New Way to Better Golf	Alex J. Morrison
July 18	20,000 Years in Sing Sing	Lewis E. Lawes
July 25	20,000 Years in Sing Sing	Lewis E. Lawes
August 1	20,000 Years in Sing Sing	Lewis E. Lawes
August 8	What We Live By	Ernest Dimnet
August 15	What We Live By	Ernest Dimnet
August 22	20,000 Years in Sing Sing	Lewis E. Lawes
August 29	What We Live By	Ernest Dimnet
September 5	A Princess in Exile	Grand Duchess Maria Pavlovna of Russia
September 12	More Merry-Go-Round	Anonymous (Drew Pearson and Robert S. Allen)
September 19	More Merry-Go-Round	Anonymous (Drew Pearson and Robert S. Allen)
September 26	More Merry-Go-Round	Anonymous (Drew Pearson and Robert S. Allen)
October 3	More Merry-Go-Round	Anonymous (Drew Pearson and Robert S. Allen)
October 10	Death in the Afternoon	Ernest Hemingway
October 17	Death in the Afternoon	Ernest Hemingway
October 24	Death in the Afternoon	Ernest Hemingway
October 31	Van Loon's Geography	Hendrik Willem van Loon
November 7	The March of Democracy	James Truslow Adams
November 14	The March of Democracy	James Truslow Adams
November 21	The March of Democracy	James Truslow Adams
November 28	Van Loon's Geography	Hendrik Willem van Loon
December 5	Van Loon's Geography	Hendrik Willem van Loon
December 12	Van Loon's Geography	Hendrik Willem van Loon
December 19	Van Loon's Geography	Hendrik Willem van Loon
December 26	Van Loon's Geography	Hendrik Willem van Loon

== See also ==
- Publishers Weekly list of bestselling novels in the United States in the 1930s
