= Udalricus =

Udalricus is the Latin form of the German name Ulrich and the forename of the following people:

- Ulrich of Augsburg, saint and Bishop of Augsburg
- Ulrich of Bamberg (also: Udalrich of Bamberg or Udalricus Babenbergensis; died probably 1127), Roman Catholic priest and chronicler in Bamberg
- Ulrich Han (or Haan, also Udalricus Gallus; born probably around 1425; died not before 1478), one of the earliest German Inkunabeldrucker mit einer Offizin im Ausland
- Johannes Ulrich von Federspiel (Johannes Udalricus of Federspill; 1739–1794), South Tyrolese impresario and playwright from Laas
- Ulrich of Lustnau (Udalricus de Lustnow; around 1102), around 1100 witness to a donation to Hirschau Abbey
- Ulrich of Minden, (also Uldalricus of Minden), German Bishop of Minden
- Ulrich Zasius (also: Huldrichus or Udalricus Zasius; 1461–1535), German lawyer and Christian humanist

the name of the church in Aspach in the county of Gotha, Germany

Seh also:

- Ulrich, Udalrich
