= Ulrikke =

- Gender: Female
- Language: Norwegian, Danish
- Name day: 24 March (Norway)

Origin
- Region of origin: Scandinavia

Other names
- Related names: Ulrike, Ulrika, Ulrica, Ulla (female); Ulrik, Ulrich, Ullrich, Ulerich, Ullerich (male)

Ulrikke is a feminine given name found primarily in Denmark and Norway. It is a feminine form of the masculine name Ulrik. Notable people named Ulrikke include:

- Ulrikke Brandstorp (born 1995), Norwegian singer
- Ulrikke Dahl (1846–1923), Norwegian writer
- Ulrikke Hansen Døvigen (born 1971), Norwegian actress
- Ulrikke Eikeri (born 1992), Norwegian tennis player
- Ulrikke Greve (1868–1951), Norwegian textile artist in the early 20th-century
- Ulrikke Høyer, Danish fashion model

== See also ==
- Ulrikke, a short story by Jorge Luis Borges
- Ulrike, people known by the given name
- Ulrica / Ulrika, people known by the given name
