= Ulrica =

Ulrica, also spelled Ulrika, is a female given name of Germanic origins. Its male equivalent is Ulric, Ulrich or Ulrik.

Ulrike and Ulrikke are alternative names derived from Ulrica. A German diminutive thereof is Ullie, Swedish Ulla.

Ulrica may refer to:

== People ==
- Ulrika Eleonora, Queen of Sweden (1688–1741)
- Ulrica Elisabeth von Liewen (1747–1775), rumored parent (along with King Adolf Frederick of Sweden) of Lolotte Forssberg
- Ulrika Åberg (1771–1852), Swedish ballerina
- Ulrica Arfvidsson (1734–1801), Swedish fortune teller
- Ulrika Björn (born 1973), Swedish footballer
- Ulrika Ericsson, Playboy Playmate of the Month for November 1996
- Ulrika von Fersen (1749–1810), Swedish socialite, a known figure of the Gustavian age, the inspiration of a poem
- Ulrika Heindorff (born 1983), Swedish politician
- Ulrika Jonsson (born 1967), Swedish personality on British television
- Ulrika Knape (born 1955), Swedish diver
- Ulrika Melin (1767–1834), Swedish artist
- Ulrika Pasch (1735–1796), Swedish painter
- Ulrika Eleonora Stålhammar (1688–1733), Swedish soldier
- Ulrika Ulla Stenberg (1774–1854), Swedish artist
- Ulrika von Strussenfelt (1801–1873), Swedish writer
- Ulrika Ulla Tessin (1711–1768), Swedish lady in waiting, writer and dilettante artist
- Ulrika Widström (1764–1841), Swedish poet
- Ulrica Wilson, African-American mathematician
- Ulrika R. "Ullie" Akerstrom (1864–1941), American actress

== Fictional characters ==
- Ulrica, in Walter Scott's 1819 novel Ivanhoe and in the 1891 opera Ivanhoe
- Ulrica, in Verdi's 1859 opera Un ballo in maschera
- Sister Ulrica, a nun in the 1980s TV series Tenko
- Ulrica, the title character of the short story "Ulrikke" (original Spanish title: "Ulrica"), by Jorge Luis Borges

== See also ==
- Ulrike, given name
- Ulrikke, given name
