= Udalrich =

Udalrich or Uodalrich is a German personal name and is derived from the Old High German word elements uodal ("allodium") and richi ("mighty", "ruler"). The modern form of the name is Ulrich.

== Notable bearers of the name ==
- Oldřich (d 1034), Duke of Bohemia
- Udalrichinger, a Frankish-Alemannic aristocratic family who lived from the 8th the 11th century
- Ulrich of Brünn (d 1113), Duke of Brünn and Znaim
- Udalrich I (d 1099), Bishop of Eichstätt from 1075
- Ulrich I of Passau (also: Udalrich; b around 1027, d 1121), monastery founder and Bishop of the Diocese of Passau
- Udalrich II of Eichstätt (d 1125), Bishop of Eichstätt from 1112
- Udalrich I (count), Frankish-Alemannic count and primogenitor of the Udalrichingers
- Udalrich I of Scheyern
- Udalrich II Birker, abbot of Waldsassen Abbey from 1479 to 1486
- Udalrich II of Moravia (1134–1177), Duke of Brünn and Königsgrätz
- Udalrich of Graz, Hochfreier, d after 1156
- Udalrich of Graz (Dunkelstein), burggrave, d after 1164
- Ulrich of Zell (around 1029–1093), monk and saint
- Ulrich of Bamberg (also: Udalrich of Bamberg or Udalricus Babenbergensis; d probably 1127), Roman Catholic priest and chronicler in Bamberg
- Udalrich Schaufelbühl (1789–1856), Swiss politician
