= Ulla =

Female given name

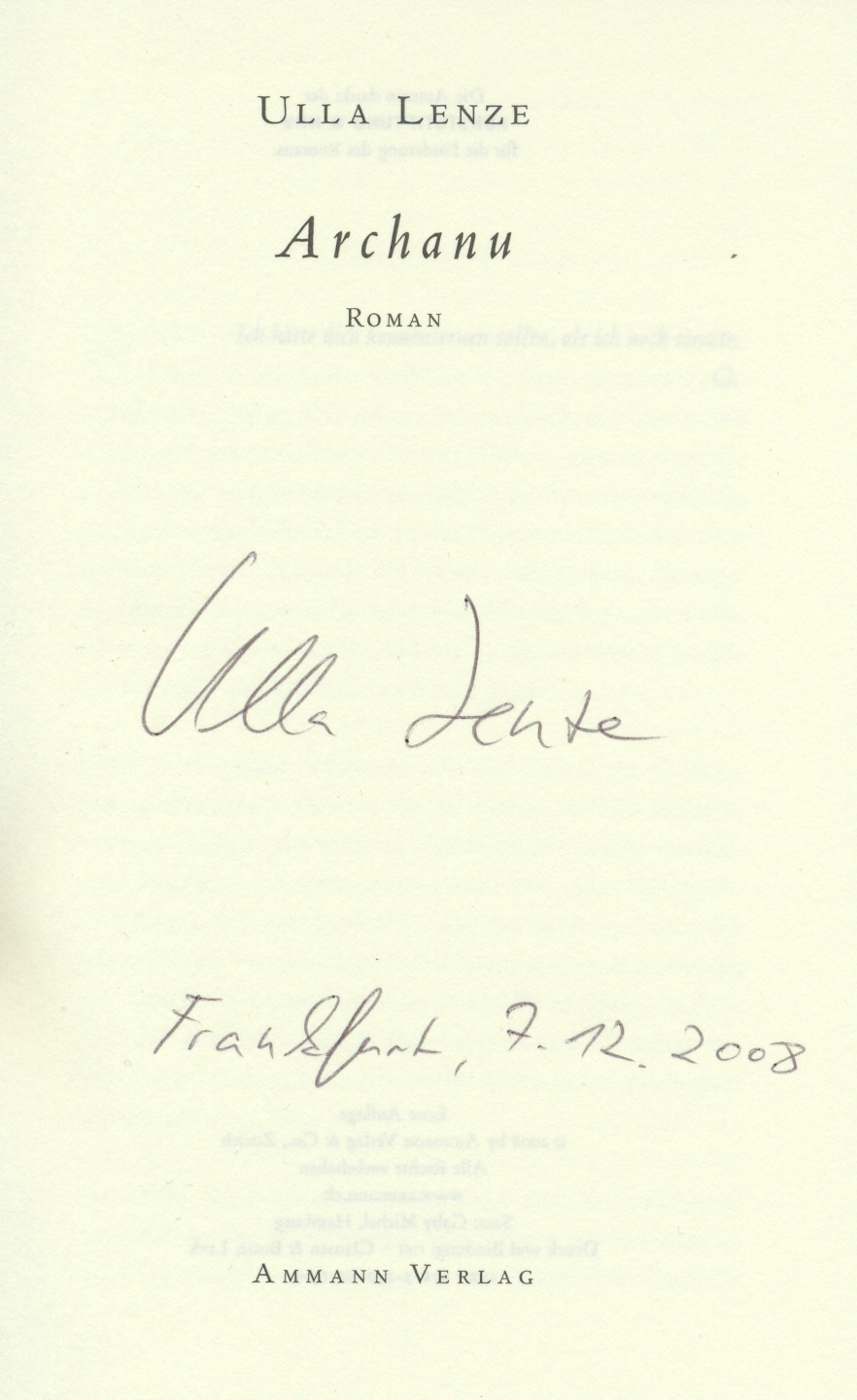
Ulla Lenze's autograph (German writer)

Ulla is a given name. It is short for Ursula in German-speaking countries and Ulrika/Ulrikke in Scandinavian countries. As of 31 December 2011, there were 61,043 females named Ulla in Sweden, with the name being most popular during the 1930s and 40s, and as of 7 June 2010, there were 25,959 females named Ulla in Finland, most born between 1940 and 1979.

== People ==
=== Pre-20th century ===
- Ulla (Talmudist) (3rd-4th centuries AD), a rabbi mentioned in the Talmud
- Ulla Adlerfelt (1736–1765), Swedish painter and noble, member of the Royal Swedish Academy of Arts
- Ulla von Höpken (1749–1810), Swedish lady-in-waiting, leading socialite and noble
- Ulrika Pasch (1735–1796), Swedish painter and miniaturist also known as Ulla Pasch
- Johanna Ulrica Ulla Stenberg (1792–1858), Swedish damask maker
- Ulla Tessin (1711–1768), Swedish lady-in-waiting, letter writer, dilettante artist and countess, relative of Ulla von Höpken

=== Modern period ===
- Ulla Andersson (born 1946), Swedish former high fashion model and ex-wife of music producer Quincy Jones
- Ulla Andersson (politician) (born 1963), Swedish politician
- Ulla Anttila (born 1963), Finnish politician
- Ursula Ulla Burchardt (born 1954), German politician
- Ulla Dinger (born 1955), Swedish mathematician
- Ulla Essendrop (born 1976), Danish television presenter
- Ulla Hahn (born 1946), German poet and novelist
- Ulla Håkanson (born 1937), Swedish equestrian and Olympic medalist
- Ulla Hoffmann (born 1942), Swedish politician
- Ulla Isaksson (1916–2000), Swedish author and screenplay writer
- Ulla Jacobsson (1929–1982), Swedish actress
- Ursula Ulla Jelpke (born 1951), German journalist and politician
- Ulla Jürß (1923-?), German concentration camp guard convicted of war crimes
- Ulla Engeberg Killias (1945–1995), Swedish-born painter
- Ulla Lindkvist (1939–2015) Swedish orienteering competitor, first individual female world champion
- Ulla Lindström (1909–1999), Swedish journalist and politician, first woman acting Prime Minister of Sweden
- Ulla Lock (1934–2012), Danish film actress
- Ulla Löfgren (born 1943), Swedish politician
- Ulla Mitzdorf (1944–2013), German scientist in diverse fields
- Ulla Orring (born 1926), Swedish politician
- Ulla Pirttijärvi-Länsman (born 1971), Sami joik singer from Angeli, Finland
- Ulla Poulsen (1905–2001), Danish ballerina and actress
- Ulla Preeden (born 1980), Estonian geologist, academic and politician
- Ulla Saar (born 1975), Estonian illustrator, product designer, graphic artist, and interior designer
- Ulla Salzgeber (born 1958), German equestrian and Olympic (team) champion
- Ulla Sandbæk (born 1943), Danish politician
- Ursula Ulla Schmidt (born 1949), German politician, former Federal Minister for Health
- Ulla Sjöblom (1927–1989), Swedish film actress
- Ulla Smidje (1925–1972), Swedish actress
- Ulla Strand (1943–2007), Danish badminton player, member of the Badminton Hall of Fame
- Ulla Strömstedt (1939–1986), Swedish-born actress
- Ulla Tørnæs (born 1962), Danish politician, former Minister for Education and former Minister for Development Cooperation of Denmark
- Ulla Trenter (1936–2019), Swedish author
- Ulla Vuorela (1945–2011), Finnish professor of social anthropology
- Ulla Weigerstorfer (born 1967), Austrian Miss World pageant winner in 1987
- Ulla Werbrouck (born 1972), Belgian politician and Olympic judo champion
- Ulla Wester (born 1953), Swedish politician

== Biblical figures ==
- Ulla, an Asherite mentioned in 1 Chronicles 7:39 in the Bible

== Fictional characters ==
- Ulla (The Producers), in Mel Brooks' film and musical The Producers
- Ulla Winblad, in many of Carl Michael Bellman's works

== Other meanings ==
- Úlla, or Oola, a village in County Limerick, Ireland
