= Oldřišov =

- Municipality
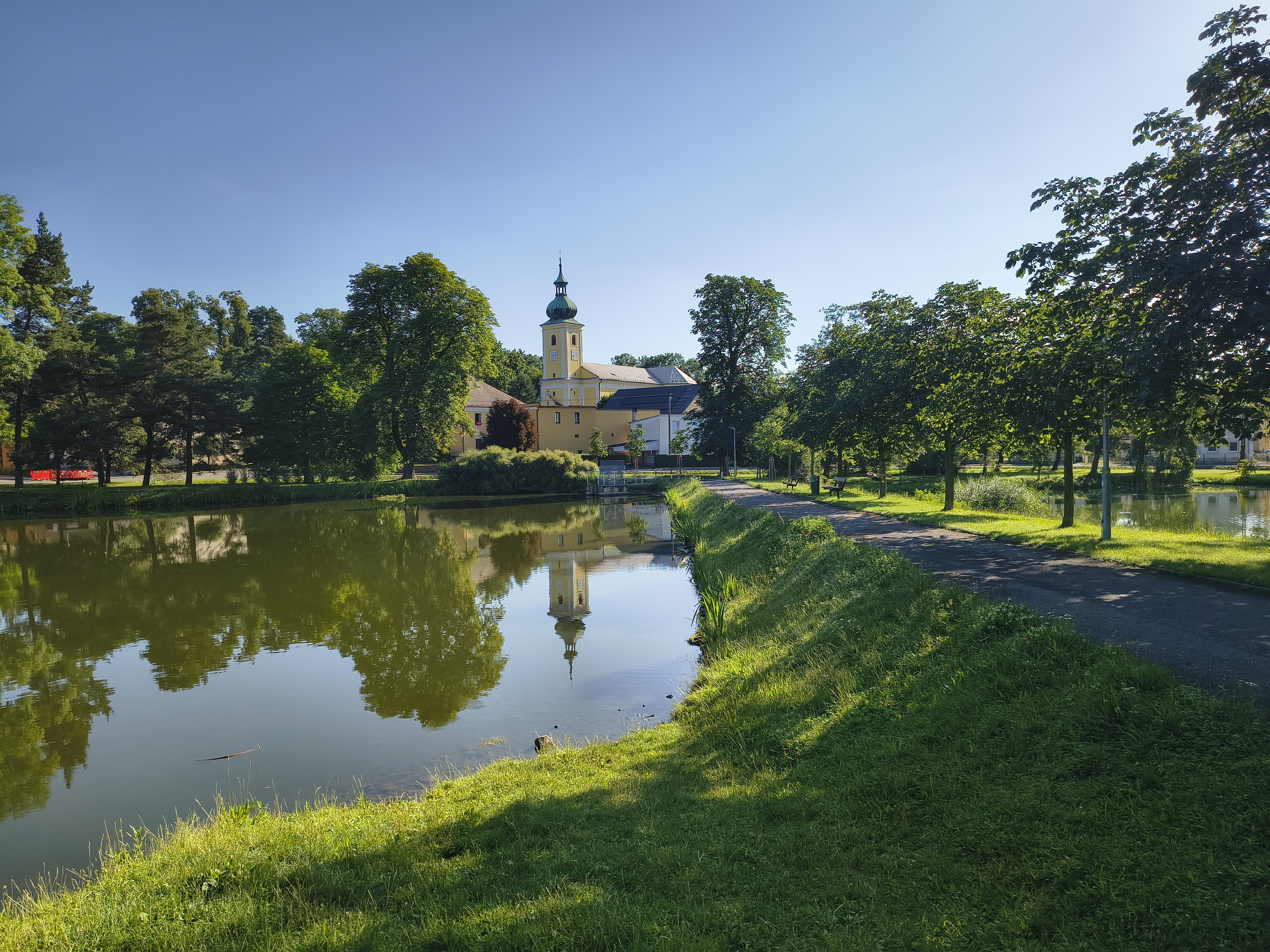
- Centre of Oldřišov

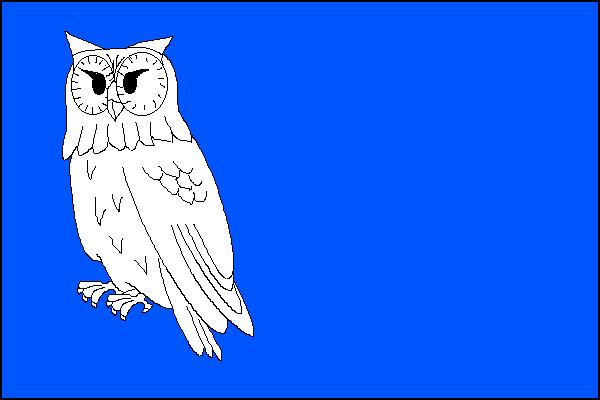
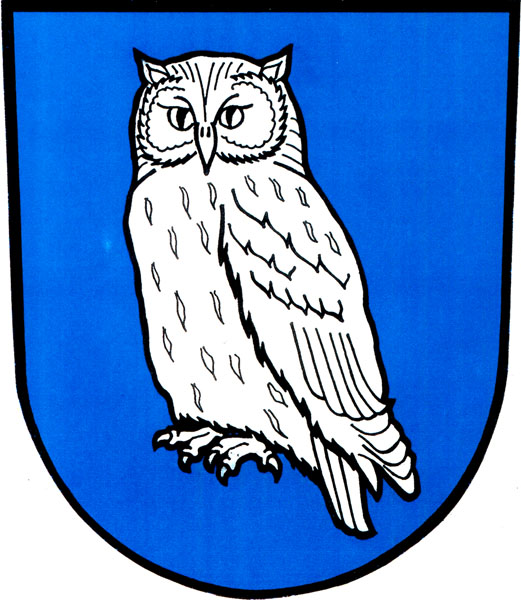
- Flag Coat of arms

- Location in the Czech Republic
- Coordinates: 49°59′29″N 17°57′39″E
- Country: Czech Republic
- Region: Moravian-Silesian
- District: Opava
- First mentioned: 1234

Area
  - Total: 15.78 km^{2} (6.09 sq mi)
- Elevation: 283 m (928 ft)

Population (2026-01-01)
  - Total: 1,438
  - Density: 91.13/km^{2} (236.0/sq mi)
- Time zone: UTC+1 (CET)
  - Summer (DST): UTC+2 (CEST)
- Postal code: 747 33
- Website: www.oldrisov.cz

Oldřišov (German: Odersch) is a municipality and village in Opava District in the Moravian-Silesian Region of the Czech Republic. It has about 1,400 inhabitants. It is part of the historic Hlučín Region.

== Etymology ==
The name is derived from the personal name Oldřiš (a pet form of the given name Oldřich).

== Geography ==
Oldřišov is located about 7 kilometres (4 mi) northeast of Opava, on the border with Poland. It lies in the Opava Hilly Land. The highest point is at 314 m (1,030 ft) above sea level.

== History ==
The village was founded in the 12th century. The first written mention of Oldřišov is from 1234. Until 1526, it was owned by the Hradisko Monastery in Olomouc. In 1543, Oldřišov was promoted to a market town, but it lost this title several decades later. During the Thirty Years' War in 1626 and 1639, Oldřišov was looted by Danish and Swedish armies.

From 1742 to 1918, after Empress Maria Theresa had been defeated, the village belonged to Prussia. In 1920, the municipality was annexed to Czechoslovakia.

== Demographics ==
Historical population

Year	Pop.	±%
1869	1,174	—
1880	1,282	+9.2%
1890	1,345	+4.9%
1900	1,441	+7.1%
1910	1,428	−0.9%

Year	Pop.	±%
1921	1,378	−3.5%
1930	1,328	−3.6%
1950	1,199	−9.7%
1961	1,302	+8.6%
1970	1,247	−4.2%

Year	Pop.	±%
1980	1,296	+3.9%
1991	1,238	−4.5%
2001	1,334	+7.8%
2011	1,311	−1.7%
2021	1,383	+5.5%

Source: Censuses

== Transport ==
The I/46 road from Opava to the Czech–Polish border in Sudice runs through the municipal territory.

== Sights ==
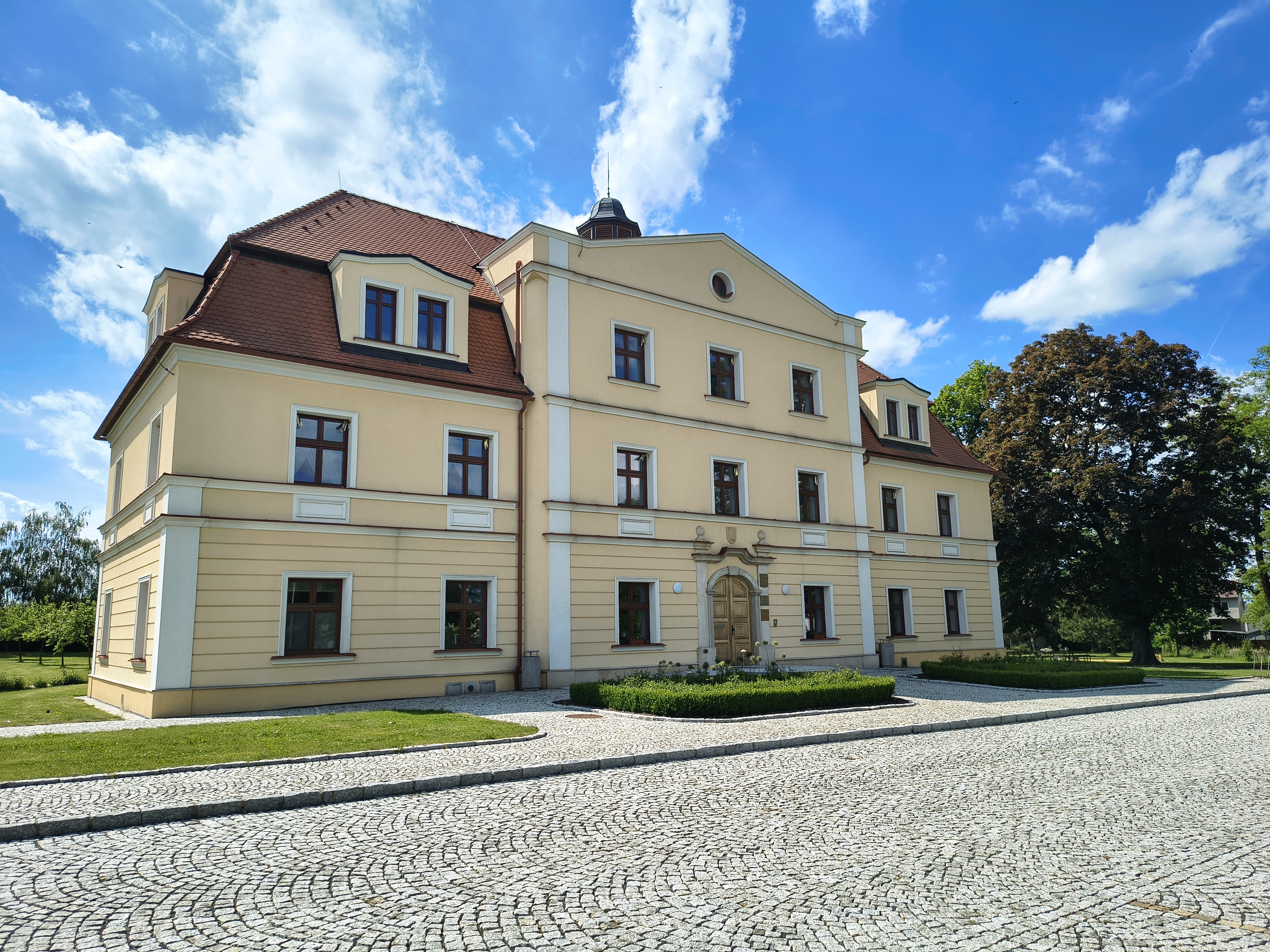
Oldřišov Castle

There are no protected cultural monuments in the municipality.

The Church of the Nativity of the Virgin Mary was built in 1803–1809 and extended at the beginning of the 20th century. It was severely damaged during World War II and had to be reconstructed.

The Oldřišov Castle was originally a fortress from the year 1526, rebuilt into a Baroque residence in 1659. The castle fell into disrepair after World War II and lost its historical value during modern reconstructions. Today it houses the municipal office, a library and a cultural centre.
