= Ulric =

Ulric is an English language, masculine given name. It is regarded as both a derivative of the Old English male name Wulfric and, in later English language contexts, also derived from the separate name Ulrich, which originated in Germany. Ulric may refer to:

== People with the name ==
See Ulrich for a list of historical individuals whose name may be anglicized as Ulric.

Modern era

- Lenore Ulric (1892–1970), a star of the Broadway stage and Hollywood silent films
- Ulric Browne, UK-based actor who plays Winston in EastEnders
- Ulric Cross (1917–2013), Trinidadian jurist, diplomat and Royal Air Force navigator
- Ulric Dahlgren (1842–1864), Union Army colonel
- Ulric Ellerhusen (1879–1957), German-American sculptor and teacher
- Ulric Guttinguer (1787–1866), French novelist
- Ulric Haynes (1931–2020), former United States Ambassador to Algeria
- Ulric Neisser (1928–2012), American psychologist
- Ulric Nisbet (1897–1987), British writer

== Fictional characters ==
- Nyx Ulric, the main protagonist in Kingsglaive: Final Fantasy XV

== See also ==
- Ulrica
- Ulrich
- Ullrich
- Ulrik
