= Oldrich =

Oldrich is a masculine given name which may refer to:

- Oldrich Kotvan (born 1990), Slovak ice hockey player
- Oldrich Majda (1930–2006), Slovak artist, painter, illustrator and sculptor
- Oldřich, a list of people with the given name
