= Aurick =

Aurick or Aurik is a masculine Germanic name, meaning protecting ruler or noble leader. Its feminine form is Aurika. It is a variant of Adalric.
