= Ulrike =

- Gender: Female
- Language: German
- Name day: 8 May

Origin
- Region of origin: Germanic countries

Other names
- Related names: Ulrikke, Ulrich, Ulrica, Ullrich, Ulerich, Ullerich

Ulrike is a Germanic female given name. Notable people named Ulrike include:

- Princess Ulrike Friederike Wilhelmine of Hesse-Kassel (1722–1787), German noble
- Ulrike von Levetzow (1804–1899), German noble and friend of Johann Wolfgang von Goethe
- Ulrike Louise of Solms-Braunfels (1731–1792), German noble
- Ulrike Adeberg (born 1970), German speed skater
- Ulrike Arnold (born 1950), German artist
- Ulrike Bahr (born 1964), German politician
- Ulrike Baumgartner (born 1974), Austrian former cyclist
- Ulrike Beisiegel (born 1952), German biochemist
- Ulrike Bruns (born 1953), German track and field athlete
- Ulrike Denk (born 1964), German sprint hurdler
- Ulrike Deppe (born 1953), German slalom canoeist
- Ulrike Diebold (born 1961), Austrian physicist and educator
- Ulrike Draesner (born 1962), German author
- Ulrike Felt (born 1957), Austrian social scientist
- Ulrike Fitzer, née Flender (born 1982), German Air Force pilot
- Ulrike Folkerts (born 1961), German actress
- Ulrike Frank (born 1969), German actress
- Ulrike Goldmann (born 1980), German singer for the group Blutengel
- Ulrike Gräßler (born 1987), German ski jumper
- Ulrike Grossarth (born 1952), German artist, dancer and academic
- Ulrike Guérot (born 1964), German political scientist
- Ulrike Haage (born 1957), German pianist and composer
- Ulrike Henschke (1830–1897), German pioneer of women's education
- Ulrike Hiller (born 1965), German politician
- Ulrike Hoffmann-Richter (1958–2024), German psychiatrist
- Ulrike Holmer (born 1967), German sports shooter
- Ulrike Holzner (born 1968), German bobsledder
- Ulrike Jurk (born 1979), German volleyball player
- Ulrike Klees (born 1955), German swimmer
- Ulrike Kleindl (born 1963), Austrian long-jumper
- Ulrike Klotz (born 1970), German gymnast
- Ulrike Koch (born 1950), German sinologist and filmmaker
- Ulrike Krumbiegel (born 1961), German actress
- Ulrike Liedtke (born 1958), German musicologist and politician
- Ulrike Lienbacher (born 1963), Austrian artist
- Ulrike Lunacek (born 1957), Austrian politician
- Ulrike Mai (born 1960), German actress
- Ulrike Maisch (born 1977), German long-distance runner
- Ulrike Malmendier (born 1973), German economist and professor
- Ulrike Mathesius (born 19??), German plant microbiologist
- Ulrike Meinhof (1934–1976), German left-wing militant and co-founder of the Red Army Faction
- Ulrike Meyfarth (born 1956), German high jumper
- Ulrike Müller (politician) (born 1962), German politician
- Ulrike Müller (artist) (born 1971), Austrian visual artist
- Ulrike Müßig (born 1968), German jurist and legal historian
- Ulrike Ottinger (born 1942), German filmmaker, documentarian photographer and professor
- Ulrike Poppe (born 1953), German politician
- Ulrike Reinhard (born 1960), German publisher and author
- Ulrike Richter (born 1959), German swimmer
- Ulrike Rodust (born 1949), German politician
- Ulrike Rosenbach (born 1943), German video artist
- Ulrike Sarvari (born 1964), German sprinter
- Ulrike Schmetz (born 1979), German footballer
- Ulrike Schwerdtner (born 1973), German volleyball player
- Ulrike Sennewald (born 1989), German rower
- Ulrike Stange (born 1984), German handballer
- Ulrike Stanggassinger (born 1968), German alpine skier
- Ulrike Tauber (born 1958), German swimmer
- Ulrike Theusner (born 1982), German artist
- Ulrike Tillmann (born 1962), German mathematician
- Ulrike Urbansky (born 1977), German track and field athlete
- Ulrike Weichelt (born 1977), German cyclist
- Ulrike Werner (born 19??), Austrian slalom canoeist
- Ulrike Winter (born 1940), Australian fencer

== See also ==
- Ulrikke, people known by the given name
- Ulrica / Ulrika, people known by the given name
