= Huldricus =

Huldricus (also Huldaricus, Huldrych, Huldreich) is a variant of the given name Ulrich first introduced by Zwingli in the early 16th century and occasionally used as a variant of the name since.

- Huldrych Zwingli (1484–1531), leader of the Swiss Reformation
- Huldaricus Mutius, latinized name of Ulrich Hugwald (1496–1571)
- Fridericus Huldaricus, latinized name of Frederick Ulrich, Duke of Brunswick-Lüneburg (1591–1634)
- Huldaricus Schönberger (Johann Ulrich Schönberger, 1601–1649), German blind organist, organ builder and polymath
- Huldreich Georg Früh (1903–1945), Swiss composer
- Jakob Huldreich Bachmann (1843–1915), Swiss politician

== See also ==
- Ulrich § History
