= Only Yesterday =

Only Yesterday may refer to:

- Only Yesterday (1933 film), an American drama starring Margaret Sullavan
- Only Yesterday (1991 film), a 1991 Japanese anime film
- "Only Yesterday" (song), a song by the Carpenters
- Only Yesterday (album), a greatest hits album by the Carpenters
- Only Yesterday: The Carpenters Story, a 2007 British TV documentary
- Only Yesterday: An Informal History of the 1920s, a 1931 work of non-fiction by Frederick Lewis Allen
- Only Yesterday (novel), a 1945 novel by S. Y. Agnon
