= Vash =

Vash may refer to:

- Vash (Star Trek), a fictional character in the Star Trek franchise
- Vash the Stampede, the protagonist of the manga series Trigun
- Vash Young (1889–1965), American motivational writer
- Vash, a 2023 Indian Gujarati-language film
  - Vash: Level 2, 2025 direct sequel to the film
- Vash: Possessed by the Obsessed, a 2023 Indian Hindi-language film
- Veterans Affairs Supportive Housing (VASH); see HUD-VASH

== See also ==
- Vaush (born 1994), American political YouTuber and Twitch streamer
