= Hugh Nisbet =

Hugh Nisbet may refer to:

- Hugh Bryan Nisbet (1902–1969), Scottish chemist and principal of Heriot-Watt University
- Hugh Barr Nisbet (1940–2021), British literary scholar
- Ulric Nisbet (Hugh Ulric Swinscow Nisbet, 1897–1987), British writer
