= Ceridwen (disambiguation) =

Ceridwen or Cerridwen is a legendary Welsh female figure.

The name may also refer to:

- Ceridwen Dovey (born 1980), South African-Australian social anthropologist and author
- Ceridwen Fraser (born 1979), Australian bio-geographer
- Ceridwen Peris, pseudonym of Alice Gray Jones (1852–1943), Welsh writer and editor
- Cerridwen Fallingstar (born 1952), American wiccan priestess, shamanic witch, and author

== See also ==
- Ceredwen, a Welsh musical duo of the 1990s
