= George Ulrich =

George Ulrich may refer to:

- George Ulrich (baseball) (1869–1918), American baseball outfielder
- George Henry Frederick Ulrich (1830–1900), New Zealand mineralogist and professor
- George Ulrich (American geologist) (born 1934), American geologist and volcanologist
