= Uldis =

Latvian masculine given name

- Gender: Male

Origin
- Region of origin: Latvia

Other names
- Related names: Ulrich

Uldis is a Latvian male given name that is a variant of the Germanic name Ulrich, which means "powerful heritage". The name may refer to:

- Uldis Augulis (born 1972), Latvian politician
- Uldis Bērziņš (1944–2021), Latvian writer
- Uldis Briedis (born 1942), Latvian politician
- Uldis Ģērmanis (1915–1997), Latvian historian
- Uldis Osis (born 1948), Latvian economist
- Uldis Pūcītis (1937–2000), Latvian actor
- Uldis Saulīte (born 1980), Latvian rugby union footballer
- Uldis Sesks (born 1962), Latvian politician
