= Ulrike (disambiguation) =

Ulrike is a German feminine given name. It may also refer to:

- Ulrike (genus), a genus of snakefly
- 885 Ulrike, a minor planet orbiting the Sun
