= Chris Greening =

Biochemist, microbiologist, and academic (born 1987)

- Born: February 25, 1987 (age 39); Warrington, UK
- Occupations: Biochemist, microbiologist, academic, journalist
- Awards: Discovery Early Career Researcher Award (DECRA) Fellowship, Australian Research Council (ARC); Emerging Leader 2 (EL2) Fellowship, National Health and Medical Research Council (NHMRC); Fellow (FASM), Australian Society for Microbiology; Fenner Medal, Australian Academy of Science; Life Scientist of the Year, Prime Minister's Prizes for Science

Academic background
- Education: University of Oxford; University of Otago

Academic work
- Institutions: Monash University
- Website: http://www.greeninglab.com

Chris Greening (born February 25, 1987) is a biochemist, microbiologist, academic, and journalist. He is a professor of microbiology and leads the One Health Microbiology group and Global Change Research Program of the Biomedicine Discovery Institute at Monash University in Melbourne, Australia. He is most known for his work on the basis, role, and significance of the microbial metabolism of trace gases such as hydrogen, methane, carbon monoxide, and carbon dioxide. He has held prestigious fellowships from the CSIRO (2014–2016), Australian Research Council (2017–2019), and National Health and Medical Research Council (2020–2024) and was awarded the Fenner Medal 2022 from the Australian Academy of Science. Greening was awarded the Prime Minister's Prize for Life Scientist of the Year in 2023.

== Early life and education ==
Greening was born in a working-class family, and grew up in Wallasey, Clevedon, and Nailsea. He completed his secondary education at Nailsea School and received scholarships to attend St. Catherine's College, University of Oxford. He graduated with a degree in molecular and cellular biochemistry in 2010. After emigrating to New Zealand, he earned his Ph.D. in microbiology and immunology from the University of Otago in 2014. His dissertation, "Physiological roles of the three [NiFe]-hydrogenases in Mycobacterium smegmatis", was primarily supervised by Gregory Cook and was formally recognized as "exceptional".

Between 2002 and 2017, he served as a staff member for various video game music websites. While still studying at Nailsea School, he was the co-webmaster for SquareSound, a website dedicated to music from Square Enix games., and later founded Square Enix Music Online in 2006 and VGM Online in 2014. These websites featured a database of soundtracks, news articles, soundtrack reviews, interviews with composers, and composer biographies. He also served as a publicist for video game concerts and documentaries, as well as an author of an academic book on the topic.

== Career ==
After receiving his doctorate, Greening gained postdoctoral and lecturing experience with short-term positions at the University of Otago, CSIRO, and Australian National University. In 2016, he established his research group at Monash University's School of Biological Sciences and completed an environmentally-focused ARC DECRA Fellowship. After being awarded a medically focused NHMRC EL2 Fellowship, he became an associate professor at Monash University's Department of Microbiology in 2020 and was promoted to full professor in 2022. He is the environmental microbiology advisor for the Australian Society for Microbiology, and serves as an editor for the journals mSystems and Microbial Genomics.

== Research ==
Greening has studied the use of microbiology to address global challenges, including climate change, infectious disease, and food and water security. His group and collaborators integrate the fields of microbial biochemistry, physiology, genetics, ecology, biogeochemistry, and biotechnology. This depends on using techniques such as metagenomics, gas chromatography, cryo-electron microscopy, and CRISPR interference.

Greening co-discovered that atmospheric trace gases are major energy sources for microorganisms. He provided the first genetic proof that microorganisms mediate the major biogeochemical process of atmospheric hydrogen oxidation. Through microbial genetics and biochemistry, he identified the unique hydrogenase enzymes that mediate this process, demonstrated that they are important for long-term survival of dormant bacteria, and resolved their structure and mechanism at atomic detail. At the ecosystem scale, he has demonstrated that atmospheric trace gas oxidation is mediated by multiple bacterial and archaeal phyla, and helps sustain biodiversity and productivity of terrestrial and aquatic ecosystems. Notably, his team have revealed that some extreme environments such as Antarctic desert soils are driven primarily by atmospheric energy sources, rather than photosynthesis. His work has also confirmed the basis and role of atmospheric carbon monoxide oxidation.

Greening has also worked on methane emissions. He has revealed complex metabolic interactions between bacteria and archaea control methane emissions from a range of systems, including soils, oceans, livestock, geothermal springs, hydrocarbon seeps, tree stems, and termite mounds. Through this work, he has also identified novel methanotrophic bacteria that consume methane at elevated or atmospheric concentrations, including "Candidatus Methylotropicum kingii" from the phylum Gemmatimonadota.

Greening is also a chief investigator of several research programs, namely SAEF: Securing Antarctica's Environmental Future, RISE: Revitalising Informal Settlements and their Environments, the ARC Research Hub for Carbon Utilisation and Recycling, and the Centre to Impact Antimicrobial Resistance. For the RISE program, he developed quantitative PCR cards that enable rapid and sensitive detection of multiple bacterial, viral, protist, and helminth pathogens across any given human, animal, or environmental sample. In the medical space, he has identified new drug targets and antimicrobial resistance mechanisms for tuberculosis, for example by resolving the biosynthesis pathway of the coenzyme F_{420}.

== Selected publications ==
- Greening, C., Berney, M., Hards, K., Cook, G. M., & Conrad, R. (2014). A soil actinobacterium scavenges atmospheric H2 using two membrane-associated, oxygen-dependent [NiFe] hydrogenases. Proceedings of the National Academy of Sciences, 111(11), 4257–4261.
- Greening, C., Biswas, A., Carere, C. R., Jackson, C. J., Taylor, M. C., Stott, M. B., ... & Morales, S. E. (2016). Genomic and metagenomic surveys of hydrogenase distribution indicate H2 is a widely utilised energy source for microbial growth and survival. The ISME journal, 10(3), 761–777.
- Ji, M., Greening, C., Vanwonterghem, I., Carere, C. R., Bay, S. K., Steen, J. A., ... & Ferrari, B. C. (2017). Atmospheric trace gases support primary production in Antarctic desert surface soil. Nature, 552(7685), 400–403.
- Greening, C., Geier, R., Wang, C., Woods, L. C., Morales, S. E., McDonald, M. J., ... & Mackie, R. I. (2019). Diverse hydrogen production and consumption pathways influence methane production in ruminants. The ISME journal, 13(10), 2617–2632.
- Grinter, R., Ney, B., Brammananth, R., Barlow, C. K., Cordero, P. R., Gillett, D. L., ... & Greening, C. (2020). Cellular and structural basis of synthesis of the unique intermediate dehydro-F420-0 in mycobacteria. Msystems, 5(3), e00389-20.
- Lappan, R., Henry, R., Chown, S. L., Luby, S. P., Higginson, E. E., Bata, L., ... & McCarthy, D. (2021). Monitoring of diverse enteric pathogens across environmental and host reservoirs with TaqMan array cards and standard qPCR: a methodological comparison study. The Lancet Planetary Health, 5(5), e297-e308.
