= The Founding of New England =

History book by James Truslow Adams

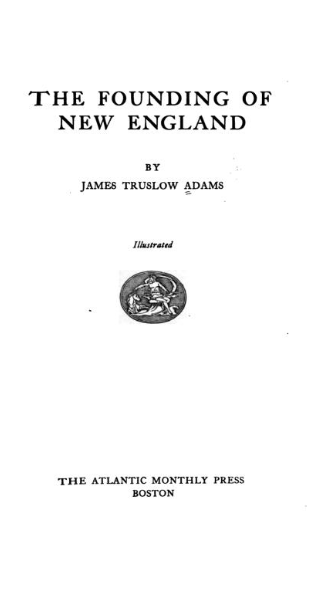
- Author: James Truslow Adams
- Language: English
- Genre: Non-fiction
- Publication date: 1921
- Publication place: United States

The Founding of New England is a history book by James Truslow Adams. It won the 1922 Pulitzer Prize for History.
