= Wulfric =

Wulfric or Wolfric is an Old English masculine given name, composed of wulf "wolf" and the suffix -ric "realm, power". In some English language contexts, Ulric is a derivative of Wulfric (although Ulric may also be a variant of Ulrich). Wulfric is a cognate of the Norse name Rikiwulf.

== People ==
- Wulfric Spot (died c. 1004), Earl of Mercia and Chief Councillor of State to King Ethelred
- Wulfric of Holme, Hermit and Saint
- Wulfric of Haselbury (c. 1080 - 1154), hermit and miracle worker

== Fictional characters ==
- The chief protagonist in Wulfric the Weapon Thane by Charles W. Whistler
- One of the middle names of Albus Dumbledore, a main character in J. K. Rowling's Harry Potter series
- Wulfric Bedwyn, Duke of Bewcastle, in Mary Balogh's Slightly series
- Wulfric, one of the main characters in Outlander (film)
- Wulfric, a main character in World Without End (Follett novel) by Ken Follett
- Wulfric, the eighth and last Gym Leader to be challenged in Pokémon X and Y
- Wulfric the Wild, a common-born ally of the King Alfred the Great, primary protagonist in Gary Whitta's novel Abomination
- Wulfric, a rare blade awakened from the Beastly Core Crystal in Xenoblade Chronicles 2.
