= Ulrik =

Ulrik is a male name, a Scandinavian form of Ulrich. Ulrik may refer to:

- Ulrik Frederik Christian Arneberg (1829–1911), Norwegian politician for the Conservative Party
- Albert Ulrik Bååth (1853–1912), Swedish poet
- Ulrik Balling (born 1975), Danish professional football player
- Ulrik of Denmark (1578–1624)
- Ulrik of Denmark (1611–1633)
- Johan Ulrik Sebastian Gripenberg (1795–1869), Finnish politician
- Christian Ulrik Gyldenløve (1611–1640), Danish diplomat and military officer
- Hans Ulrik Gyldenløve (1615–1645), Danish diplomat
- Ulrik Christian Gyldenløve (1630–1658), illegitimate child of Christian IV of Denmark and Vibeke Kruse
- Ulrik Christian Gyldenløve, Count of Samsø (1678–1719), Danish navy Admiral and son of Christian V of Denmark
- Ulrik Frederik Gyldenløve, Count of Laurvig (1638–1704), King Frederick III of Denmark's illegitimate son
- Ulrik Huber (1636–1694), professor of law at the University of Franeker and a political philosopher
- Ulrik Imtiaz Rolfsen (born 1972), Pakistani Norwegian movie director
- Ulrik Jansson (born 1968), Swedish footballer
- Ulrik Johansen (born 1980), Danish professional football player
- Per-Ulrik Johansson (born 1966), Swedish golfer
- Christian Ulrik Kastrup (1784–1850), Norwegian jurist, military officer and politician
- Ulrik Knudsen (born 1978), Danish politician
- Ulrik Frederik Lange (1808–1878), Norwegian politician
- Ulrik Laursen (born 1976), Danish professional footballer
- Ulrik le Fevre (born 1946), Danish former professional football player and manager
- Kaj Ulrik Linderstrøm-Lang (1896–1959), Danish protein scientist and director of the Carlsberg Laboratory
- Ulrik Lindgren (born 1955), Swedish Christian democratic politician
- Ulrik Lindkvist (born 1981), Danish professional football (soccer) player
- Lars Ulrik Mortensen, Danish harpsichordist and conductor
- Ulrik Anton Motzfeldt (1807–1865), Norwegian jurist and politician
- Ulrik Munther (born 1994), Swedish singer
- Ulrik Neumann (1918–1994), Danish film actor and musician
- Ulrik Nilsson (born 1963), Swedish politician
- Ulrik Olsen (1885–1963), Norwegian Minister of Local Government Affairs
- Ulrik Saltnes (born 1992), Norwegian footballer
- Ulrik Samnøy (born 2002), Norwegian freestyle skier
- Harald Ulrik Sverdrup (politician) (1813–1891), Norwegian priest and politician
- Søren Ulrik Thomsen (born 1956), Danish poet
- Ulrik Torsslow (1801–1881), Swedish actor and theatre director
- Søren Ulrik Vestergaard (born 1987), Danish professional football player
- Adolf Ulrik Wertmüller (1751–1811), Swedish painter
- Ulrik Frederik Cappelen (1797–1864), Norwegian jurist and politician
- Ulrik Wilbek (born 1958), Danish team handball coach
- Claes-Ulrik Winberg (1925–1989), Swedish industrialist and business executive

== See also ==
- Ulric (disambiguation)
- Ulrica
- Ulrich
- Ulrike (disambiguation); feminine form
- Ullrich
