= Lester J. Ulrich =

American politician (1908–1991)

Lester Julius Ulrich (November 15, 1908 – November 25, 1991) was an American lawyer and politician.

Ulrich was born in Willow Creek, Blue Earth County, Minnesota. He graduated from Amboy High School in Amboy, Minnesota in 1926. Ulrich went to Macalester College and then received his law degree from University of Minnesota Law School. He lived in Amboy, Minnesota and practiced law in Amboy, Minnesota. Ulrich served in the Minnesota House of Representatives in 1933 and 1934. Ulrich died at his home in Crosslake, Crow Wing County, Minnesota.
