= Katherine Belov =

Australian geneticist

Katherine Belov AO FAA FRSN
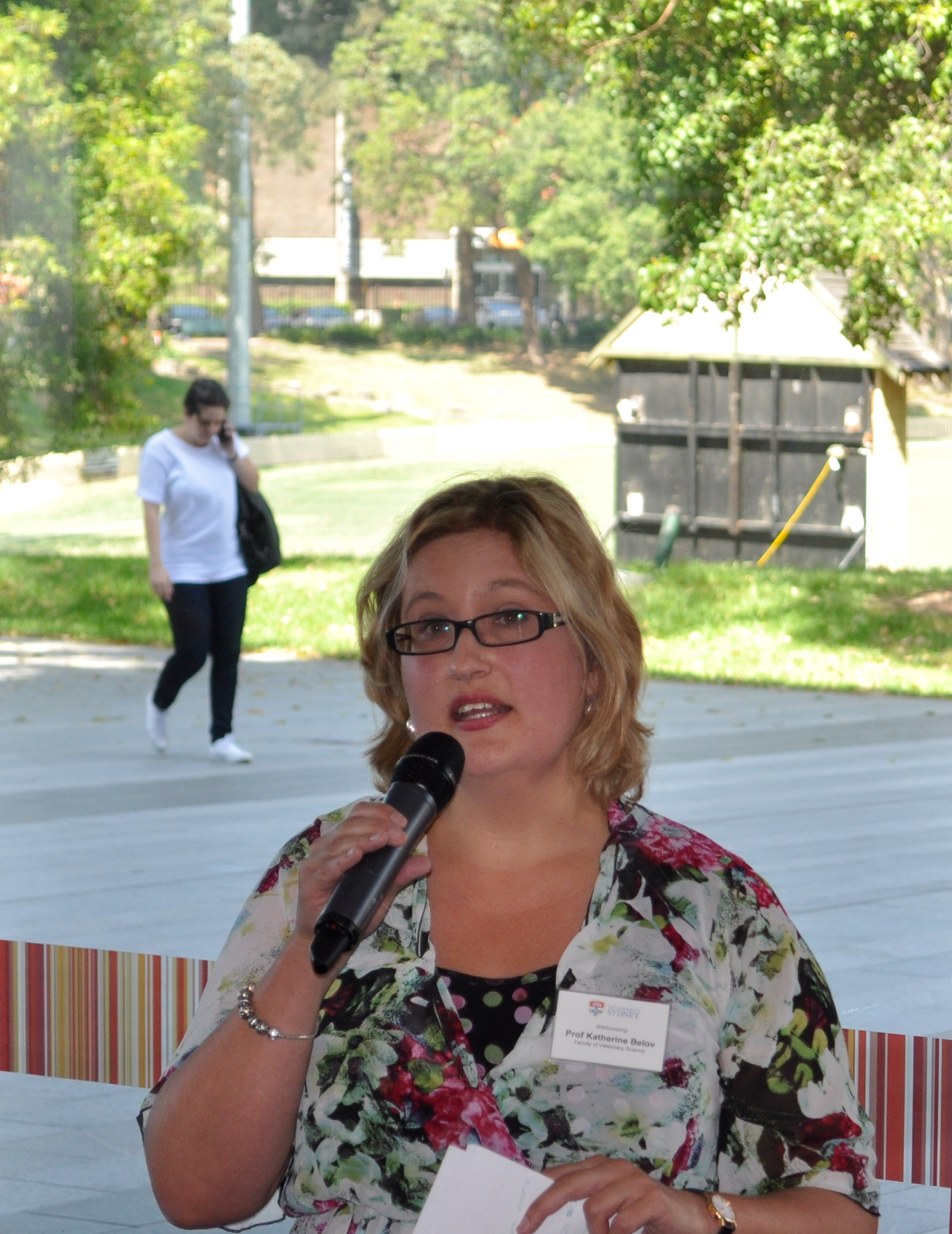
- Katherine Belov in 2014
- Born: 1973 (age 52–53); Sydney, Australia
- Awards: The Australian Institute of Policy and Science (AIPS) Tall Poppy award (2008), Received People's Choice Award, at the 20th Australian Museum Eureka Prizes (2009), Australian Research Council Future Fellowship (2009), Australian Museum Eureka Prize for Research and Innovation, Environmental Research (2011)

Academic background
- Education: Macquarie University

Academic work
- Institutions: The University of Sydney
- Main interests: Genetics, genomics, marsupial and monotreme genomics, evolution of the adaptive immune system
- Notable works: Genetics of Tasmanian devil facial tumor disease

Katherine Belov (born 1973) is an Australian geneticist, professor of comparative genomics in the School of Life and Environmental Sciences and Pro Vice Chancellor of Global Engagement at the University of Sydney. She is head of the Australasian Wildlife Genomics Group and research expert in the area of comparative genomics and immunogenetics, including Tasmanian devils and koalas, two iconic Australian species that are threatened by disease processes. Throughout her career, she has disproved the idea that marsupial immune system is primitive, characterized the South American gray short-tailed opossum's immune genes, participated in the Platypus Genome Project, led research identifying the properties of platypus venom, and identified the cause of the spread of the Tasmanian devil's contagious cancer.

Belov is an advocate for Women in STEM and leads a research team of largely female students and post-doctoral students.

== Biography ==
Katherine Belov was born in Sydney, Australia in 1973 to Nick and Larissa Belov. Both of her parents were immigrants to Australia and of Russian heritage. Belov grew up in West Ryde, New South Wales and pursued her undergraduate degree at Macquarie University in human genetics. She was persuaded to change from human genetics to animal genetics by Professor Des Cooper who would become her PhD supervisor, and initially worked on grey kangaroos, but quickly changed to the study of marsupials. She challenged a theory by another researcher who believed that marsupials did not have a highly developed immune system and proved that they had sophisticated immune systems comparable to our own. The research inspired her to enroll in a PhD program on marsupial immunology at Macquarie University. She earned her PhD in 2002, and began her postdoctoral work at the Australian Museum with an Australian Research Council Fellowship.

In 2004, as part of the team, Belov became one of the primary researchers to sequence the genome of the platypus. The results, involving the work of over 100 international scientists, were published in Nature in May 2008. Among the findings were that the platypus has unique anti-microbial peptides with broad-spectrum potential for fighting a variety of bacteria and viruses, and possibly staph infections in humans. Belov's research continued and she now leads her own team of researchers from the University of Sydney, they began to characterise the platypus venom, which has no antivenom and causes severe pain to humans. They were able to complete the analysis in 18 months, verifying seven snake-like zinc metalloproteinases, seven toxins similar to the alpha-latrotoxins of black widow spiders, six cysteine-rich secretory proteins (CRISPs) like those found in some lizards and gila monsters, as well as some minor components similar to those of sea anemone venom.

In 2007, Belov accepted a lectureship position at the Faculty of Veterinary Science at the University of Sydney, after failing to secure a position elsewhere at the university, and began to focus on the contagious cancer, devil facial tumour disease, which started spreading through the Tasmanian devil population in 1996. She worked with many others who proposed that the problem was that devils lack major histocompatibility complex gene diversity. Belov proved her hypothesis, that devils do not mount an immune response to the cancer because the tumour's genetic makeup is so similar to their own.

Belov became a full Professor of Comparative Genomics at the University of Sydney and has received an Australian Research Council (ARC) Future Fellow award to continue her research in identifying genes, not only for devils and platypuses, but for other native Australian species like skinks and wallabies. In 2014, she was awarded the Fenner Medal for research in biology from the Australian Academy of Science.

In 2016, she was appointed to the new role of Pro-Vice-Chancellor (Global Engagement) at the University of Sydney as part of its DEI initiatives. This role includes responsibility for managing the development and execution of the University's global engagement strategy.

Belov's research team made some prominent discoveries in 2016. Firstly, new research that proved antimicrobial peptides (called cathelicidins) in Tasmanian devil's milk can kill the deadliest bacteria and fungi, an important discovery in the fight against superbugs. The second was the discovery of nine new genetic variants in the remote South West Tasmanian devil population.

Belov has published over 170 peer-reviewed papers, mostly as passive author, including papers in Nature, Proceedings of the National Academy of Sciences and PLoS Biology.

Now, her team, the Australasian Wildlife Genomics Group, studies the molecular genetics and evolution of gene families and genomes of our native wildlife. Research is focused on the immune system, evolutionary conservation genetics and applications for conservation management.

Belov promotes Women in STEM and sits on the University of Sydney SAGE Advisory Council.

Belov received the Officer of the Order of Australia in recognition of her service as an academic and researcher to higher education (especially comparative genomics).

== Honours ==
- 2008 – The Australian Institute of Policy and Science (AIPS) Tall Poppy award
- 2009 – People's Choice Award, at the 20th Australian Museum Eureka Awards
- 2010 – Sydney Magazine Top 100 most influential Sydney-siders
- 2011 – Eureka Awards Research and Innovation, Environmental Research, The Devils' Advocates
- 2014 – The Genetics Society of Australasia "Ross Crozier Medal"
- 2014 – Australian Academy of Science, Fenner Medal for Research in Biology (Excluding the Biomedical Sciences)
- 2018 – Fellow of the Royal Society of New South Wales
- 2019 – Officer of the Order of Australia
- 2022 – Fellow of the Australian Academy of Science
- 2024 – University of Glasgow Honorary Doctor of Science (DSc)
