= Fortunes for All =

1959 book by Vash Young

Fortunes for All is the final work by Vash Young, a celebrated American author of four self-help books popular during the Great Depression. Written and first published in 1959, long after his earlier books were out of print, Fortunes for All encapsulates and expands on his earlier books with all the benefit of long hindsight. In his book Vash sets out the philosophy and methods he used to attain his own success and sets them in the context of his personal history and of the social and economic environment of the times.

== Synopsis ==
The opening chapters of Fortunes for All set out Vash Young's credentials: the long, happy and rewarding life that he has enjoyed - his 'Fortune' - through taking his own advice and living by the rules he formulated as a young man. Vash then turns to his early life of hardship, poverty, hunger and deprivation and candidly reveals how he squandered early opportunities as a young man through self-doubt and moral weakness.

Vash Young then describes the flash of insight the enabled him to re-invent himself. This was the defining point in his life when Vash the failure changed virtually overnight into Vash the success.

The bulk of the book explains in detail the methods he used to give himself the mindset needed to find his Fortune. These lessons are amply illustrate by anecdotes taken from his own life and from those of people he encountered. Vash goes out of his way to show that what he did is relevant to anyone at any time or place. The title shows his intent: Fortunes for All is intended to be a handbook for everyone.
