= Fenner Medal =

The Fenner Medal, named after the Australian virologist Frank Fenner, is awarded each year by The Australian Academy of Science for distinguished research in biology (excluding the biomedical sciences) by a scientist up to 10 years post-PhD in the calendar year of nomination.

The award is restricted to Australian residents or for biologists whose research was conducted mainly in Australia.

== Recipients ==
Source: Fenner Medal Awardees Australian Academy of Science

Year	Recipient
2024	Ana Martins Sequeira
2023	Emily Wong
2022	Chris Greening
2021	Eve McDonald-Madden
2020	Michael Bode
2019	Daniel Falster
2018	Ceridwen Fraser
2017	Simon Ho
2016	Jane Elith
2015	Ian Wright
2014	Katherine Belov
2013	Ulrike Mathesius
2012	A Harvey Millar
2011	Bryan Fry
2010	Robert Brooks
2009	Sean Connolly
2008	Michael McCarthy
2007	Peter Dodds
2006	Barry Brook
2005	Brett Neilan
2004	Greg Edgecombe
2003	Andrew Young
2002	Sandra Orgeig
2001	Barry Pogson
2000	Hugh Possingham

== See also ==
- List of academic awards
