= Volek =

Volek (Czech feminine: Volková) is a surname. Notable people with the surname include:

- Billy Volek (born 1976), American football player
- David Volek (born 1966), Czech ice hockey player
- Jaroslav Volek (1923–1989), Czech musicologist
- Zdeněk Volek (born 1985), Czech footballer

Fictional characters

- Nika Volek, a minor character on the American television series Prison Break
