= The March of Democracy =

Book by James Truslow Adams

- Title page for The March of Democracy (1932)
- Author: James Truslow Adams
- Language: English
- Genre: Non-fiction
- Publisher: C. Scribner's Sons
- Publication date: 1932, 1933
- Publication place: United States

The March of Democracy is a five-volume book by James Truslow Adams, published in 1932 and 1933 by C. Scribner's Sons. It is a chronicle with full title The March of Democracy: A History of the United States.

The first volume covers America from its discovery and early settlement to the American Revolution to 1800.

The second volume begins with the election of Thomas Jefferson as U.S. president in 1801, the War of 1812, the election of Andrew Jackson, the Mexican–American War through to the period before the American Civil War.

The third volume begins with the election of Abraham Lincoln, the states seceding, the Civil War and its aftermath, the Industrial Revolution, railroad growth and cattle kingdoms on through Grover Cleveland's term.

The fourth volume begins with the election of Benjamin Harrison, the Spanish–American War, the building of the Panama Canal, World War I, the era of great prosperity and then Great Depression and the election of Franklin D. Roosevelt.

The fifth volume picks up with Roosevelt's New Deal, financial changes and manipulations, the great Dust Bowl, the Social Security Act, the "G" men, the Supreme Court expansion attempt, the Neutrality Bill, the recession to depression era, build-up of defense and involvement with foreign issues and entry into World War II.
