= Only Yesterday: An Informal History of the 1920s =

1931 history book about the 1920s in the United States

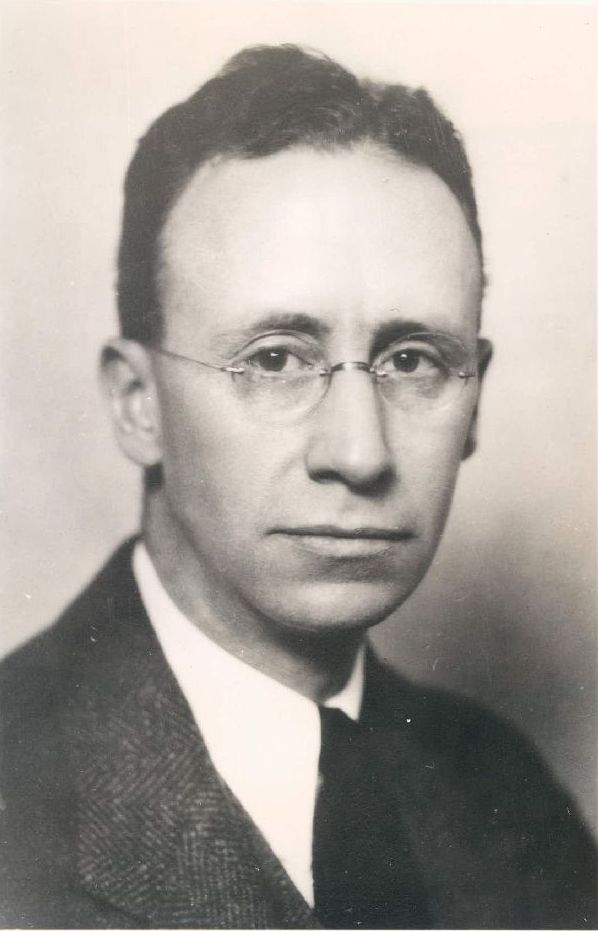
Author Frederick Lewis Allen in 1932

Only Yesterday: An Informal History of the Nineteen-Twenties is a popular history book written by Frederick Lewis Allen, published by Harper & Brothers in 1931 and reissued in 1957. Only Yesterday was a Book of the Month selection, sold 1 million copies, and was frequently assigned as college reading.

== Summary ==
The book covers events in the United States between November 11, 1918 (the end of World War I) and November 13, 1929 (which Allen described as the culmination of the Wall Street crash of 1929). Allen, who identified himself as a "retrospective journalist" rather than a historian, warns that "A contemporary history is bound to be anything but definitive". Throughout the book, Allen's focus is on "the changing state of the public mind".

The Book-of-the-Month Club bulletin recommended Only Yesterday with this summary:

Those events, those styles in dresses and hair, those headlines in the newspapers, those fads and fancies and moods and happenings, that made up so jumbled a hodgepodge as we lived along through them, are revealed now as having a sequence, an inner coherence, a logic and meaning, which we did not dream of. It adds to our mental stature thus to look back into the past not only resuscitated in every detail, but so presented that it is an understandable segment of human experience and history. Readers of this portrait of the last ten years will find in their hands many clues to a better comprehension of the next ten.

== Reception and impact ==
Only Yesterday was one of the first books to treat a decade as a significant unit of history, inspiring other writers and pundits to characterize and label successive decades. Allen's informal writing style became the pattern for "popular history" books. Only Yesterday was credited by historian Maury Klein in 2001 as a major influence on those writing years later about the stock market crash of 1929. Klein described Allen's book as "remarkable for how much he got right about the era and its people". Historian J. Leonard Bates singled out Only Yesterday as one of the most influential sources perpetuating the view that the American public was apathetic to "the spectacle of corruption and maladministration" during the Teapot Dome scandal.

On its publication, Only Yesterday was widely praised. Fanny Butcher, literary critic for the Chicago Tribune, called Only Yesterday "superb synthetic journalism" (clarifying that she is referring to synthesis in the scientific sense) and wrote "What Mr. Allen has done is to codify the written records and statistics with the unrecorded emotional memories of the period". Addie May Swan, literary editor of the Davenport Times, describes Allen as "a calm, genial, shrewd observer" and Only Yesterday as conveying its subject skillfully, interestingly, and with humor. Mark Rhea Byers, editor of The Herald Times Reporter, recommended the book to his readers "who wish to understand their country in its present fading mood of reaction and disillusion":

There is little in it that is new, except the connections the author traces between apparently unrelated events. The connection is through the rosy spectacles of the state of mind into which we were all hypnotized by the reckless inflation of everything, from real estate to bootleg liquor.

In the Spokane Daily Chronicle, Bob Hill announced its reissue in 1957, writing "His was the book that blew the mustiness out of historical writing". In a review of Darwin Payne's biography, The Man of Only Yesterday, historian Nelson M. Blake criticized Allen's use of secondary materials and overemphasis on fads and styles. Historian Robert K. Murray believed Allen's reliance on newspaper headlines resulted in an "alarmingly defective" presentation of the Harding years.

Historian David M. Kennedy credits Only Yesterday with shaping "our understanding of American life in the 1920s" for more than half a century. Kennedy's 1986 analysis of the book points out gaps in Only Yesterday, noting that Allen fails to examine the lives and stories of immigrants, the Blacks remaining in the south, or the millions of farmers and rural residents. Kennedy wrote, "What Allen did see with vivid clarity were the lifestyles of Harper's readers." He compares Only Yesterday unfavorably to William Preston Slosson's The Great Crusade and After, saying that the continuing popularity of the former "sadly suggests that the reading public prefers style to substance in its historians".

In 1981, historian William E. Ellis characterized Only Yesterday as "one of the most popular and influential books to span nearly a half century of historiography". Historian Kenneth S. Lynn writes: "Allen's misreadings of the twenties—of its social history no less than its political history—are ultimately traceable to an inadequately critical attitude toward the gargoyle journalism of the era."
