= Frederick Lewis Allen =

American historian (1890–1954)

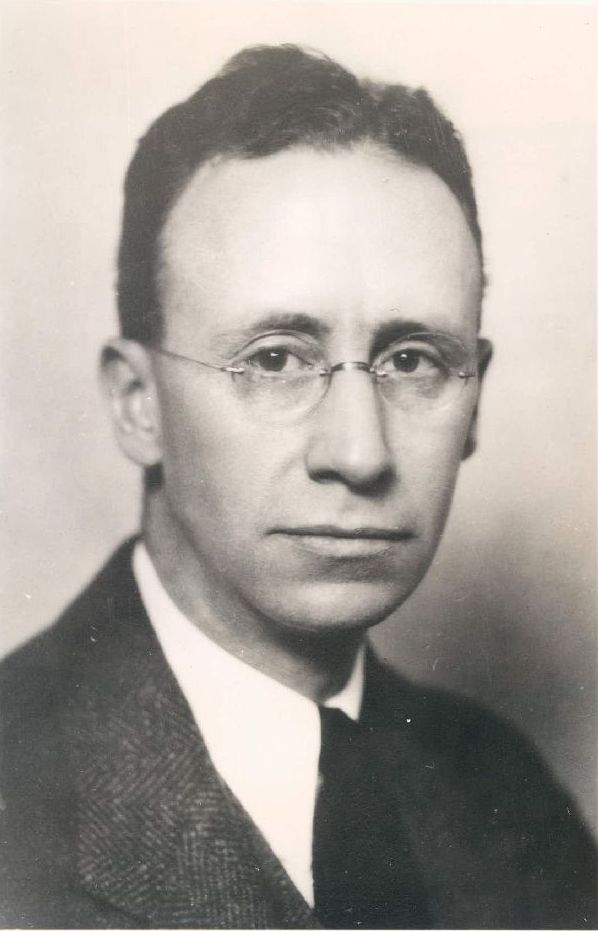
- Allen in 1932
- Born: July 5, 1890; Boston, Massachusetts, U.S.
- Died: February 13, 1954 (aged 63)
- Education: Groton School; Harvard University
- Occupations: Historian; editor
- Spouse: Dorothy Penrose Cobb

Frederick Lewis Allen (July 5, 1890 – February 13, 1954) was the editor of Harper's Magazine and also notable as an American historian of the first half of the twentieth century. His specialty was writing about recent and popular history.

== Life ==
Allen was born in Boston, Massachusetts. He studied at Groton, graduated from Harvard University in 1912 and received his Master's in 1913. He taught at Harvard briefly thereafter before becoming assistant editor of the Atlantic Monthly in 1914, and then managing editor of The Century in 1916. He began working for Harper's in 1923, becoming editor-in-chief in 1941, a position he held until shortly before his death, aged 63, in New York City. His wife, Dorothy Penrose Allen (née Cobb, a first cousin of Ambassador Ellsworth Bunker), died just prior to the 1931 publication of his best-known book, Only Yesterday: An Informal History of the 1920s.

He died on February 13, 1954, and is buried in lot 395, section 7 of Forest Hills Cemetery in Jamaica Plain.

== Works ==
Allen's popularity coincided with increased interest in history among the book-buying public of the 1920s and 1930s. This interest was met, not by the university-employed historian, but by an amateur historian writing in his free time. Aside from Allen, these historians included Carl Sandburg, Bernard DeVoto, Douglas Southall Freeman, Henry F. Pringle, and Allan Nevins (before his Columbia appointment).

His most famous book was the enormously popular Only Yesterday (1931), which chronicled American life in the 1920s. Since Yesterday (1939), a sort of sequel that covered the Depression of the 1930s, was also a bestseller. The 1933 Hollywood film Only Yesterday was ostensibly based on his book, but actually used only its timeline, with a fictional plot adapted from a Stefan Zweig novel.

He wrote the introduction to Mabel S. Ulrich's collection of essays by notable woman writers of the day, including Mary Borden, Margaret Culkin Banning, Sylvia Townsend Warner, Susan Ertz, E. M. Delafield, Rebecca West, Isabel Paterson and Storm Jameson, The More I See Of Men (Harper & Brothers, 1932).

His last and most ambitious book, The Big Change, was a social history of the United States from 1900 to 1950. (He had originally written a Harper's article about how America had changed between 1850 and 1950, but decided to limit the chronological scope of his book.) Allen also wrote two biographies, the first of which was about Paul Revere Reynolds, a literary agent of the era. This work is notable for containing a chapter about Stephen Crane but is difficult to find because it was privately published.

In 1950, Allen was one of five narrators for the RKO Radio Pictures documentary film, The Golden Twenties, produced by Time, Inc.

== Recognition ==
The Frederick Lewis Allen Room in the New York Public Library was established by the Ford Foundation in 1958. It is Room 228e on the second floor of the library. Admission is limited to writers under book contract to a publishing company.

Allen's son, Oliver Ellsworth, also worked in journalism with a stint at Life magazine.

== Bibliography ==
- Allen, Frederick Lewis (1931). Only Yesterday: An Informal History of the 1920s. New York: Harper and Row. Archived from the original on March 12, 2001. (history)
- Allen, Frederick Lewis (1935). The Lords of Creation: The History of America's 1 Percent. New York: Harper and Row. (history, biography, economics)
- Allen, Frederick Lewis (1939). Since Yesterday: The 1930s in America, September 3, 1929 to September 3, 1939. New York: Harper and Row. (history)
- Allen, Frederick Lewis (1944). Paul Revere Reynolds: A Biographical Sketch. Scranton: The Haddon Craftsmen. (biography)
- Allen, Frederick Lewis (1948). Look at America. New York City. A Handbook in Pictures, Maps and Text for the Vacationist, the Traveler and the Stay-at-home. Boston: Houghton Mifflin. (travel)
- Allen, Frederick Lewis (1949). The Great Pierpont Morgan. New York: Harper and Row. (biography)
- Allen, Frederick Lewis (1952). Big Change: America transforms itself, 1900-1950. New York: Harper and Row. (history)
