= Ernest Dimnet =

French author (1866–1954)

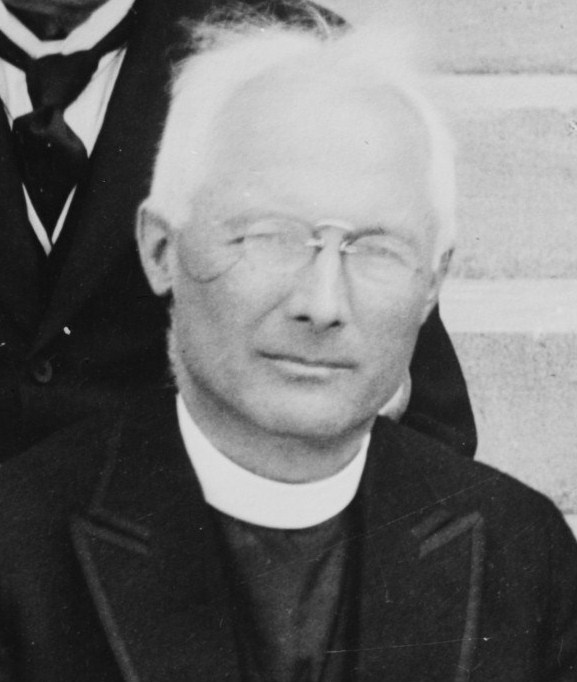
- Born: 1866; France
- Died: 8 December 1954, age 88; France
- Occupations: Writer, priest
- Writing career
- Period: 20th century
- Genre: Philosophy

Abbe Ernest Dimnet (1866 – 8 December 1954), was a French priest, writer and lecturer, and the author of The Art of Thinking, a popular book on thinking and reasoning during the 1930s.

== Biography ==
Dimnet was born in 1866, in Trélon. He served as canon at the Cambrai Cathedral and was a professor at the Stanislas College in Paris. He started writing for English magazines in 1898. He moved to the United States after the First World War and worked as a lecturer at Harvard University and the Williamstown Institute of Politics.

His most notable book, The Art of Thinking, was on the best-seller lists in the US in the 1930s, alongside Dale Carnegie's self-help works, but it is mostly forgotten today. The book invites the reader into a state of honesty where he evaluates himself as a thoughtful human being. Dimnet brings up the fact that we too often only "think of thinking" about something instead of actually thinking. He provides useful tips and advice on how to improve one's concentration, and even endeavors to answer some timeless and all-important questions such as "How do I find myself?" Finding answers to these questions, Dimnet explains, is crucial to the production of any original thought. We must know ourselves in order to think for ourselves.

On 8 December 1954, Dimnet died of a heart attack at his home in Paris.

== Works ==
In French

- La Pensée catholique dans l'Angleterre contemporaine, V. Lecoffre, (1906)
- Figures de moines, Perrin, (1909)
- Les soeurs Brontë, Bloud, (1910)
- L'Art de penser, Grasset, (1930)

In English

- Paul Bourget: A Literary Biography, (1913)
- France Herself Again, (1914)
- The Evolution of Thought in Modern France, (1915)
- From a Paris Balcony, (1924)
- The Art of Thinking, (1929)
- What We Live By, (1932)
- My Old World, (1935)
- My New World, (1938)
