= Ceridwen Fraser =

Australian biogeographer

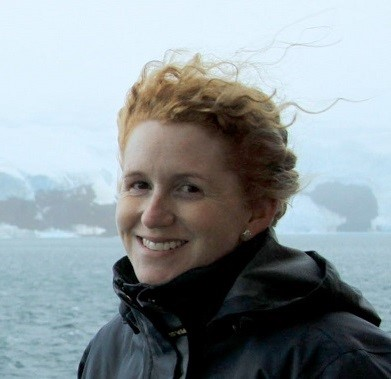
- Fraser in 2016
- Born: 1979 (age 46–47); Canberra, Australian Capital Territory
- Education: University of Canberra (undergraduate); Macquarie University (undergraduate); University of Otago (PhD)
- Awards: 2014 ARC Discovery Early Career Research Career; 2016 ACT Scientist of the Year; 2018 Australian Academy of Science Fenner Medal; 2019 MacArthur & Wilson Award
- Scientific career
- Fields: Biogeography

Ceridwen Fraser is a biogeographer, currently serving as a Professor in the Department of Marine Science at the University of Otago in Dunedin, New Zealand. She focuses her studies on ecology, evolution, climate change, and how they are all significant to the southern hemisphere, specifically at higher latitudes such as Antarctica.

== Early life and career ==
Fraser was born in Canberra. While in primary school, she had a teacher who was a marine biologist and collected organisms from the ocean and displayed them in a tank in the classroom. Fraser was often distracted and amazed at these small animals, and by the age of 11, Fraser knew that she wanted to become a marine biologist. However, many adults in her life advised her that this would be a risky career choice, and therefore her first undergraduate degree was in the studies of conserving cultural materials, more specifically paper conservation, at the University of Canberra. After earning this degree, Fraser completed her second undergraduate degree in marine science at Macquarie University, after having transferred from James Cook University (because she could not handle the climate of Townsville). After graduating from Macquarie University, Fraser spent a year studying polychaete worm ecology at the Australian Museum with Pat Hutchings. She earned her PhD from the Department of Zoology at the University of Otago.

Fraser became a lecturer at the Australian National University in 2012, where she worked at and mainly conducted her research at up until 2019. In that same year, she received, and took the opportunity, to move her lab group and continue her research at the University of Otago, where she continues to be a professor.

== Research ==
Fraser's research has expanded to several different parts of the world. After receiving her doctorate, Fraser worked at two different locations as a postdoctorate fellow. The first of these occupations was at the University of Otago with the Allan Wilson Centre for Molecular Ecology, and the second being located in Université Libre de Bruxelles, Belgium with the Biological Control and Spatial Ecology group at this university. With her undergraduate and doctorate degrees, Fraser focused her research on understanding the patterns of global biodiversity through both molecular biology and earth sciences. She uses this specific field of research mostly at high latitudes in the southern hemisphere, and she has expressed a great interest in the continent of Antarctica not only due to the scientific discoveries one can make there, but also the discoveries one is able to make about themselves.

In one of Fraser's most cited research papers, she and a group of scientists sets out to ultimately deduce the extent to which the ice sheets in the southern hemisphere extended during the last glacial maximum (LGM) by examining several types of bio-organisms, specifically the Southern Bull Kelp. By examining DNA sequences, Fraser and the others discovered that the recolonization of the southern hemisphere waters by this wildlife has occurred more recently than previously thought, and it is being seen in lower latitudes than originally thought. The scientists used these results as a conclusion that the ice sheets in the LGM reached lower latitudes than previously thought by the scientific community. In other words, the amount of ice has decreased even more since the LGM than thought, pointing towards an effect that climate change has had on ice levels in the southern hemisphere. Several of Frasers most highly cited papers discuss similar topics, with each one making an important contribution to the scientific community.

== Awards and honours ==
Ceridwen Fraser has received several individual awards that are given to young or "early-career" scientists. These awards and recognitions include:

- 2014 ARC Discovery Early Career Research Career
- 2016 ACT Scientist of the Year award
- 2018 Australian Academy of Science Fenner Medal
- 2019 The MacArthur & Wilson Award

== Publications ==
A small list of some of Fraser's most cited works is below:

- Fraser, Ceridwen I.; Nikula, Raisa; Waters, Jonathan M. (7 March 2011). "Oceanic rafting by a coastal community". Proceedings of the Royal Society B: Biological Sciences. 278 (1706): 649–655. doi:10.1098/rspb.2010.1117. PMC 3030839. PMID 20843850.
- Fraser, C. I.; Nikula, R.; Spencer, H. G.; Waters, J. M. (9 February 2009). "Kelp genes reveal effects of subantarctic sea ice during the Last Glacial Maximum". Proceedings of the National Academy of Sciences. 106 (9): 3249–3253. doi:10.1073/pnas.0810635106. PMC 2651250. PMID 19204277.
- Fraser, Ceridwen I.; Nikula, Raisa; Ruzzante, Daniel E.; Waters, Jonathan M. (August 2012). "Poleward bound: biological impacts of Southern Hemisphere glaciation" (PDF). Trends in Ecology & Evolution. 27 (8): 462–471. Bibcode:2012TEcoE..27..462F. doi:10.1016/j.tree.2012.04.011. PMID 22658874. S2CID 5706091.
- Fraser, Ceridwen I; Thiel, Martin; Spencer, Hamish G; Waters, Jonathan M (2010). "Contemporary habitat discontinuity and historic glacial ice drive genetic divergence in Chilean kelp". BMC Evolutionary Biology. 10 (1): 203. Bibcode:2010BMCEE..10..203F. doi:10.1186/1471-2148-10-203. PMC 3020628. PMID 20594354.
- Fraser, C. I.; Terauds, A.; Smellie, J.; Convey, P.; Chown, S. L. (10 March 2014). "Geothermal activity helps life survive glacial cycles". Proceedings of the National Academy of Sciences. 111 (15): 5634–5639. Bibcode:2014PNAS..111.5634F. doi:10.1073/pnas.1321437111. PMC 3992698. PMID 24616489.
