= Adalric =

Adalric, Adalrich, Adelric, or Adelrich is a Germanic given name. Notable people with the name include:

- Athalaric (516–534), King of the Ostrogoths
- Adalrich, Duke of Alsace (died after 683)
- Adalric of Gascony, late 8th century lord
- Adalric, Bishop of Asti

== See also ==
- Ulrich
