= James Truslow Adams =

American writer and historian (1878–1949)

- Born: October 18, 1878; Brooklyn, New York, U.S.
- Died: May 18, 1949 (aged 70); Southport, Connecticut, U.S.
- Education: New York University (then Polytechnic Institute of Brooklyn; BA); Yale University (MA)
- Writing career
- Period: 1921–1933
- Subjects: History, biographies
- Notable work: The March of Democracy
- Notable awards: Pulitzer Prize for History; 1921 The Founding of New England

James Truslow Adams (October 18, 1878 – May 18, 1949) was an American writer and historian. He was a freelance author who helped to popularize the latest scholarship about American history and his three-volume history of New England is well regarded by scholars. He popularized the phrase "American Dream" in his 1931 book The Epic of America.

== Early life ==
Adams was born in Brooklyn, New York, to a wealthy family, the son of Elizabeth Harper (née Truslow) and stockbroker William Newton Adams Jr. His father served two terms as mayor of Summit, New Jersey.

His father had been born in Caracas, Venezuela. His paternal grandfather, William Newton Adams Sr., was American of English descent with roots in Virginia and his paternal grandmother, Carmen Michelena de Salias, a Venezuelan of Spanish descent with roots in eighteenth-century Gipuzkoa and Seville. The earliest paternal ancestor was Francis Adams from England, an indentured servant who settled the Province of Maryland in 1638.

Adams took his bachelor's degree from the New York University Tandon School of Engineering (then Polytechnic Institute of Brooklyn) in 1898, and a MA degree from Yale University in 1900. He entered investment banking, rising to partner in a New York Stock Exchange member firm. In 1912, he considered his savings ample enough to switch to a career as a writer.

In 1917, he served with Colonel House on President Woodrow Wilson's commission, "The Inquiry", to prepare data for the Paris Peace Conference. By 1918, he was a captain in the Military Intelligence Division of the General Staff of the U.S. Army. By late 1918, he was selected for the U.S. delegation to the Paris Peace Conference. His main task consisted in the provision of maps and the selection of plans and atlases that should be acquired by the War College, the American Geographical Society, and the Library of Congress.

== Writer ==
Adams gained national attention with his trilogy on the history of New England (1921–26), winning the Pulitzer Prize for the first volume. Scholars welcomed his social history of the colonial era, Provincial Society, 1690–1763 (1927). He wrote popular books and magazine articles in a steady stream. His Epic of America was an international bestseller, and was included in Life's list of the 100 outstanding books of 1924–1944. He was also the editor of a scholarly multi-volume Dictionary of American History. Adams was the editor, with Roy V. Coleman as managing editor, of The Atlas of American History (New York: Charles Scribner's Sons, 1943), and The Album of American History, 4 vols. (New York: Charles Scribner's Sons, 1944).

=== American Dream ===
Adams coined the term "American Dream" in his 1931 book The Epic of America. His American Dream is "that dream of a land in which life should be better and richer and fuller for everyone, with opportunity for each according to ability or achievement. It is a difficult dream for the European upper classes to interpret adequately, and too many of us ourselves have grown weary and mistrustful of it. It is not a dream of motor cars and high wages merely, but a dream of social order in which each man and each woman shall be able to attain to the fullest stature of which they are innately capable, and be recognized by others for what they are, regardless of the fortuitous circumstances of birth or position."

However, Adams felt the American Dream was in peril during the 1920s and 30s. He complained that "money-making and material improvements" were viewed "as good in themselves", taking "on aspects of moral virtues." The original American Dream had always been about "quality and spiritual values": "[T]he American dream that has lured tens of millions of all nations to our shores in the past century has not been a dream of merely material plenty, though that has doubtless counted heavily. It has been much more than that." He warned that "we have forgot to live, in the struggle to 'make a living'". The Epic of America was his attempt to save a "priceless heritage" and sustain the distinctly American understanding of progress in humane and moral terms. The true American Dream was of "a genuine individual search and striving for the abiding values of life", and for the "common man to rise to full stature" in the free realms of "communal spiritual and intellectual life."

=== Two educations ===
A quote from one of Adams' essays "There are obviously two educations. One should teach us how to make a living and the other how to live" is widely misattributed to John Adams. The quote is part of an essay by Adams entitled "To 'Be' or to 'Do': A Note on American Education" which appeared in the June, 1929 issue of Forum. The essay is very critical of American education, both in school and at the university level, and explores the role of American culture and class-consciousness in forming that system of education.

In a more complete version of that quote, Adams says:

There are obviously two educations. One should teach us how to make a living and the other how to live. Surely these should never be confused in the mind of any man who has the slightest inkling of what culture is. For most of us it is essential that we should make a living.... In the complications of modern life and with our increased accumulation of knowledge, it doubtless helps greatly to compress some years of experience into far fewer years by studying for a particular trade or profession in an institution; but that fact should not blind us to another—namely, that in so doing we are learning a trade or a profession, but are not getting a liberal education as human beings.

== Death ==
Adams lived in Southport, Connecticut, where he died of a heart attack in 1949.

== Honors ==
After 1930, Adams was active in the American Academy of Arts and Letters serving as both chancellor and treasurer of that organization. He was also a member of the National Institute of Arts and Letters, the Massachusetts Historical Society, American Antiquarian Society, American Historical Association, and the American Philosophical Society. Among British societies, he was honored as a fellow of the Royal Society of Literature.

== Bibliography ==
- James Truslow Adams (1921). The Founding of New England. Atlantic Monthly Press. pp. 3–.; Gutenberg. Pulitzer Prize for History
- Revolutionary New England (1923); James Truslow Adams (1 November 2001). reprint. Simon Publications LLC. ISBN 978-1-931541-57-2.
- New England in the Republic, 1776-1850 (1926)
- Provincial Society, 1690-1763 (1927)
- Our Business Civilization: Some Aspects of American Culture (1929)
- The Adams Family (1930); Kessinger Publishing, 2005, ISBN 9780766197749
- The Tempo of Modern Life (1931)
- The Epic of America (1931); Simon Publications 2001 paperback: ISBN 1-931541-33-7; reprint. Transaction Publishers. 1 May 2012. ISBN 978-1-4128-4701-8.
- The March of Democracy (2 vols. 1932–1933)
- Justice Without (1933)
- Henry Adams (1933)
- America's Tragedy (1934)
- The Record of America (1935)
- Building the British Empire: To the End of the First Empire (1938)
- James Truslow Adams: Select Correspondence. Transaction Publishers. 1 June 2012. ISBN 978-1-4128-4697-4.

Adams wrote 21 monographs between 1916 and 1945. He was also editor in chief of the Dictionary of American History, The Atlas of American History, and other volumes.

== Sources ==
- McCracken, M. J., comp. "Another Bibliography of James Truslow Adams." Bulletin of Bibliography 15 (May 1934):65-68.
- Nevins, Allan. James Truslow Adams: Historian of the American Dream. (1968)
- Nenes, Allan (ed.), James Truslow Adams: Select Correspondence. Piscataway, NJ: Transaction Publishers, 2012.
- Porter, K. W. "Negro in American Life: A Reply to J.T. Adams' Interpretation in His Book The American." Journal of Negro History 29 (April 1944):209-20.
- Taylor, C. James. "James Truslow Adams." In Dictionary of Literary Biography, vol. 17: Twentieth-Century American Historians, 3–8. Ed. by Clyde N. Wilson. Detroit, Mich.: Gale Research Company, 1983.
- Who's Who on the Web, s.v. "Adams, James Truslow" (n.p.: Marquis Who's Who, 2005)
- Library of Congress Website
- To "Be" or to "DO" by JAMES TRUSLOW ADAMS;Forum (1886–1930); Jun 1929; VOL. LXXXI, NO. 6; APS Online, pg. 321
