= Mabel S. Ulrich =

American medical doctor and health educator (1876–1945)

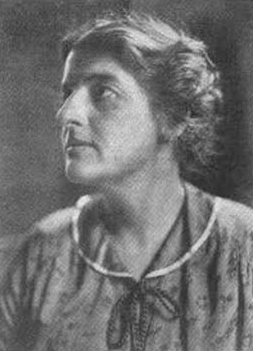
- Mabel S. Ulrich as photographed by Pearl Grace Loehr, from a 1914 publication
- Born: 1876; New York
- Died: August 12, 1945 (aged 69); Marine on St. Croix, Minnesota
- Other name: Mabel Simis Ulrich
- Occupations: Medical doctor, public health educator, writer, businesswoman

Mabel Simis Ulrich (1876 – August 12, 1945) was an American medical doctor and health educator, lecturing nationally on sex and hygiene for the YWCA. She also wrote, owned several bookstores, and ran the Minnesota Writers' Project during the 1930s.

== Early life ==
Mabel Palmer Simis was from Vails Gate, New York, the daughter of Adolph Simis Jr. and Emma Van Duzen Simis. Her father was born in Germany, and a United States Navy veteran of the American Civil War. He was Commissioner of Charities for Brooklyn and Queens at the time of his death in 1900. Mabel Simis graduated from Cornell University in 1897, served as a naval hospital nurse in 1898, and earned her medical degree at Johns Hopkins University in 1901.

== Career ==
=== Medicine and public health ===
Ulrich practiced medicine in Minneapolis, where she served on the vice commission, the Board of Public Welfare, and the Health and Hospitals committee. She was a student health advisor to young women at the University of Minnesota, and Supervisor of Social Hygiene Education in the Division of Veneral Diseases at the state Board of Health. She spoke in favor of eugenics education in high schools at a teachers' conference in Montana in 1913, but favored preventive measures such as education and premarital health certificates, and denounced eugenic sterilization.

In 1914, Ulrich was appointed by the YWCA to tour schools and colleges, lecturing on sex and hygiene subjects. In 1916, she gave a summer institute for teachers interested in teaching sex education classes. Her pamphlet "Mothers of America" (1919), aimed at young women, has been described as an unusually direct, detailed, and informative example of the genre from before World War I. Another Ulrich pamphlet was "The Girl's Part" (1918). She debated with Alice Stone Blackwell in an essay in The Woman Citizen in 1919; she was in favor of laws confining women with sexually transmitted diseases, Blackwell was opposed.

=== Writing and books ===
Beyond medicine and public health, Ulrich was interested in writing. She published short fiction, including "The Swede's Angel" (1905), and a play, Daylight Saving (1933). She opened a bookstore in Minneapolis in 1921, and by 1927 owned five bookshops in Minnesota. Her shops also sold rare prints. In 1931, she was appointed to head of the Minnesota implementation of the Federal Writers' Project, a program of the federal Works Progress Administration. She resigned that post in 1938. She edited a collection of essays by women, titled The More I See Of Men (Harper & Brothers, 1932), with an introduction by Frederick Lewis Allen. In the 1930s and 1940s, she wrote book reviews for The Saturday Review of Literature.

== Personal life ==
Mabel Simis married a fellow Hopkins-trained doctor, Henry Ludwig Ulrich. They had two daughters, Katherine and Josephine; their younger daughter Josephine Simis Ulrich followed her parents into a medical education at Johns Hopkins University. Mabel Simis Ulrich died in 1945, aged 69 years, when she fell off a cliff while staying at her summer home in Marine on St. Croix, Minnesota.
