= Ulrike Mathesius =

Australian microbiologist

Ulrike Mathesius is a German–Australian plant microbiologist in the Division of Plant Sciences at Australian National University (ANU) and became Director of the Research School of Biology (RSB) in 2026. She is an Australian Research Council (ARC) Future Fellow at the ANU, National Tertiary Education Union (NTEU) member and Professor at the ANU in plant science, biotechnology and plant-microbe interactions. Her research focuses on root microbe interactions and symbionts to parasites. Mathesius won the 2013 Fenner Medal awarded by the ARC for research in biology (excluding the biomedical sciences) for outstanding early-career researchers under the age of 40.

== Background ==
Mathesius was born in Germany where she received her Diploma in Biology (BSc Hons) at the Technical University of Darmstadt in 1995. She came to Australia in 1993 after spending two years as an undergraduate and spent a year at the ANU's Research School of Biological Sciences (RSBS) working with four different research groups which sparked her interest in a research career. After she finished her degree in Germany, she won an international post-graduate scholarship to the ANU. She carried out her PhD at the RSBS between 1996 and 1999, which focused on the symbiosis between rhizobia and legumes. She joined the NTEU when she finished her doctorate. This was followed by post doctoral research at RSBS in the area of plant proteomics between 1999 and 2001. In 2002 she moved to the School of Biochemistry and Molecular Biology with a Post Doctoral Fellowship from the ARC. She then held an ARC Research Fellowship and is now an ARC Future Fellow working on the developmental regulation of nodulation, parasitic gall development and lateral root formation in legumes. In 2026, Mathesius was appointed Director of the Research School of Biology at the Australian National University, located in Canberra.

== Research ==
Mathesius investigates how soil microbes shape the plant by developing and applying techniques at a molecular, cellular and whole plant level. A central idea of her work is that microbes 'hijack' plant signalling pathways for their own purposes. Her research laboratory specializes in investigating quorum sensing, the chemical signalling systems bacteria use to coordinate gene transcription leading to collective behaviour and defining the mechanisms that symbiotic and pathogenic organisms use to manipulate plant development. They have discovered, that plants using a sophisticated surveillance and response system, can distinguish between harmful and beneficial bacteria and mimic their chemical communication signals in an attempt to thwart their offensives. This has implications for utilising microbes to alter crop plant performance and for trying to develop nitrogen-fixing symbioses in non-legumes.

== Awards and recognition ==
- 2013 – Fenner Medal: Awarded by The Australian Research Council
- 2011 – Australian Awards for University Teaching for Outstanding Contribution to Student Learning: Awarded by The Australian Government Office for Learning and Teaching
- 2009 – Joint College Award for Excellence in Education: Awarded by The ANU College of Medicine, Biology & Environment and the ANU College of Physical & Mathematical Sciences
- 2009 – Vice Chancellor's Award for Excellence in Education, for Outstanding Contribution to Student Learning: Awarded by The Australian National University
- 2007 – Peter Goldacre Award: Awarded by The Australian Society of Plant Scientists
- 2006 – Rebeiz Foundation for Basic Research Prize: Awarded by Rebeiz Foundation for Basic Research
- 2006 – ACT Young Tall Poppy Science Award: Awarded by The Australian Institute for Policy and Science
