= Ulrich Braukmann =

German economist

Ulrich Braukmann (born 6 April 1959) is a German professor at the Schumpeter School of Business and Economics of the Bergische Universität Wuppertal. At the Schumpeter School, he is the head of the Institut für Gründungs- und Innovationsforschung and at the same time the chair holder of the Faculty of Educational Theory of Economics, Gründungspädagogik und Gründungsdidaktik.

== Biography ==
Braukmann has studied economics (including educational theory of economics), sport and social sciences at the University of Cologne, the German Sport University Cologne as well as the London School of Economics and Political Science. He obtained his doctorate at the faculty of Economics and Social Sciences of the University of Cologne and habilitated in 1997 under Peter F. E. Sloane at the Faculty of Economics of the Friedrich-Schiller-Universität in Jena. Upon receiving four appointments to the economic departments of the universities of Wuppertal, Stuttgart-Hohenheim and Leipzig, he took over the recently created Professorship of Educational Theory of Economics, Gründungspädagogik und Gründungsdidaktik at the Schumpeter School of Business and Economics of the Bergische Universität Wuppertal. Together with the principal of the Bergische Universität Wuppertal, Lambert T. Koch, he established the Institut für Gründungs- und Innovationsforschung (IGIF) (jointly headed by both professors). The current focus of work and research lies in the field of integrative promotion of start-ups and innovations. However, other areas of interest are : entrepreneurship education, entrepreneurial career development, management development, as well as the development of entrepreneurial personalities and organizations.

== Selected bibliography ==
- Braukmann, Ulrich: Makrodidaktisches Weiterbildungsmanagement, Köln 1993.
- Braukmann, Ulrich: »Entrepreneurship Education« an Hochschulen – Der Wuppertaler Ansatz einer wirtschaftspädagogisch fundierten Förderung der Unternehmensgründung aus Hochschulen. In: Weber, Birgit (Hrsg.): Kultur der Selbständigkeit in der Lehrerausbildung, Bergisch Gladbach 2002, p. 47-98.
- Braukmann, Ulrich/Schneider, Daniel: Implikationen der Gründungspädagogik und -didaktik für das Controlling ambitionierter Entwicklungsmaßnahmen. in: Pütz, Markus/Böth, Thorsten/Arendt, Volker (Ed.): Controllingbeiträge im Spannungsfeld offener Problemstrukturen und betriebspolitischer Herausforderungen - Festschrift für Winfried Matthes, Köln/Lohmar 2008, p. 197-262.
- Baumann, Wolfgang/Braukmann, Ulrich/Matthes, Winfried (Hrsg.): Innovation und Internationalisierung, Wiesbaden 2010.
