= Willow Creek, Minnesota =

Unincorporated community in Minnesota, US

Willow Creek
- Unincorporated community
- Location within Minnesota Location within the United States
- Coordinates: 43°53′41″N 94°16′07″W
- Country: United States
- State: Minnesota
- County: Blue Earth
- Elevation: 1,024 ft (312 m)
- Time zone: UTC-6 (Central (CST))
  - Summer (DST): UTC-5 (CDT)
- Area code: 507
- GNIS feature ID: 655013

Willow Creek is an unincorporated community in Pleasant Mound Township, Blue Earth County, Minnesota, United States.
