= Ulla Stenberg =

Swedish artist (1792–1858)

- Born: Johanna Ulrica Colliander; 1792; Jönköping, Sweden
- Died: 1858 (aged 65–66)
- Known for: Textile arts
- Spouse: Gottfrid Stenberg (m. 1822)

Johanna Ulrica "Ulla" Stenberg (née Colliander; 1792–1858) was a Swedish damask maker.

She was born Jönköping, Sweden, daughter of Anna Christina and vicar Nils Johan Colliander. She was professional damask maker from 1822, and had her own weaving school from 1830. She also designed her own damask patterns. She participated in the art exhibitions at the Prince Carl Palace in Stockholm 1834–1840 and in Stockholm and London in 1851 and Paris in 1855. She had a Royal Warrant of Appointment in Sweden and international customers.
