= Ulrich Hugwald =

Ulrich Hugwald (Udalricus Hugualdus, Huldaricus Mutius Hugwaldus; 1496–1571) was a Swiss humanist scholar and Reformer.

Born in Wilen near Bischofszell, county of Thurgau, he was enrolled in the theological faculty in Basel University from 1519. He published critical pamphlets with Basel printer Adam Petri from 1520. He was in correspondence with a number of reformers, such as Vadianus, Michael Stifel, Jacques Lefèvre d'Étaples and Guillaume Farel. He also opened a private school of rhetorics in Basel. In 1524, he debated with Oecolampadius and Thomas Müntzer on the topic of believer's baptism. He joined the Basel Anabaptists in 1525, and was consequently imprisoned. He retired to his native Thurgau, working as a craftsman and farmer for some time. On his return to Basel, he distanced himself from the Anabaptists and was no longer active in religious debate. He taught at the Basel gymnasium from 1535, becoming rector in 1540, and he was professor for logic and ethics at the University of Basel from 1542.

In 1539, he published De Germanorum prima origine, a chronistic account of the Germanic peoples (edited by Struve in 1726). In an early expression of German nationalism, the publication aimed to defend the antiquity and nobility of the German race against the opinion held by Italian humanists which considered the Germans barbarous and enlightened only by Latin learning. Hugwald's work is substantially based on the Chronography by Swabian historian Johannes Nauclerus, published in 1516, to a lesser degree drawing on Franciscus Irenicus, Heinrich Bebel, Beatus Rhenanus, and others. The work is therefore of little value independent of that of Nauclerus except for its expressions of early German national sentiment paired with a patriotic love of his own homeland in Switzerland (Müller 1886).

== Bibliography ==
- 1520 Dialogus, studiorum, suorum, prooemium et militiae initium.
- 1520 Ad omnes qui Christum, seu regnum dei, ex animo quaerunt.
- 1521 Ad Sanctam Tigvrinam Ecclesiam Vdalrici Hvgvaldi Epistola.
- 1521 Tres epistolae, quarum ultima legunt qui hodie Euangelistas persequuntur et caveant, ne lacessitus ad arma deposita redeat.
- 1522 Est Tibi Lector Brevissimo Compendio Per Vlrichvm Hugualdum, unde hominum perditio, in quoque sit corum salus. Basel 1522.
- 1539 De Germanorum prima origine. moribus, institutis, legibus et memorabilibus pace et * bello gestis etc. Basiliae apud Henricum Petrum.
