= Vash Young =

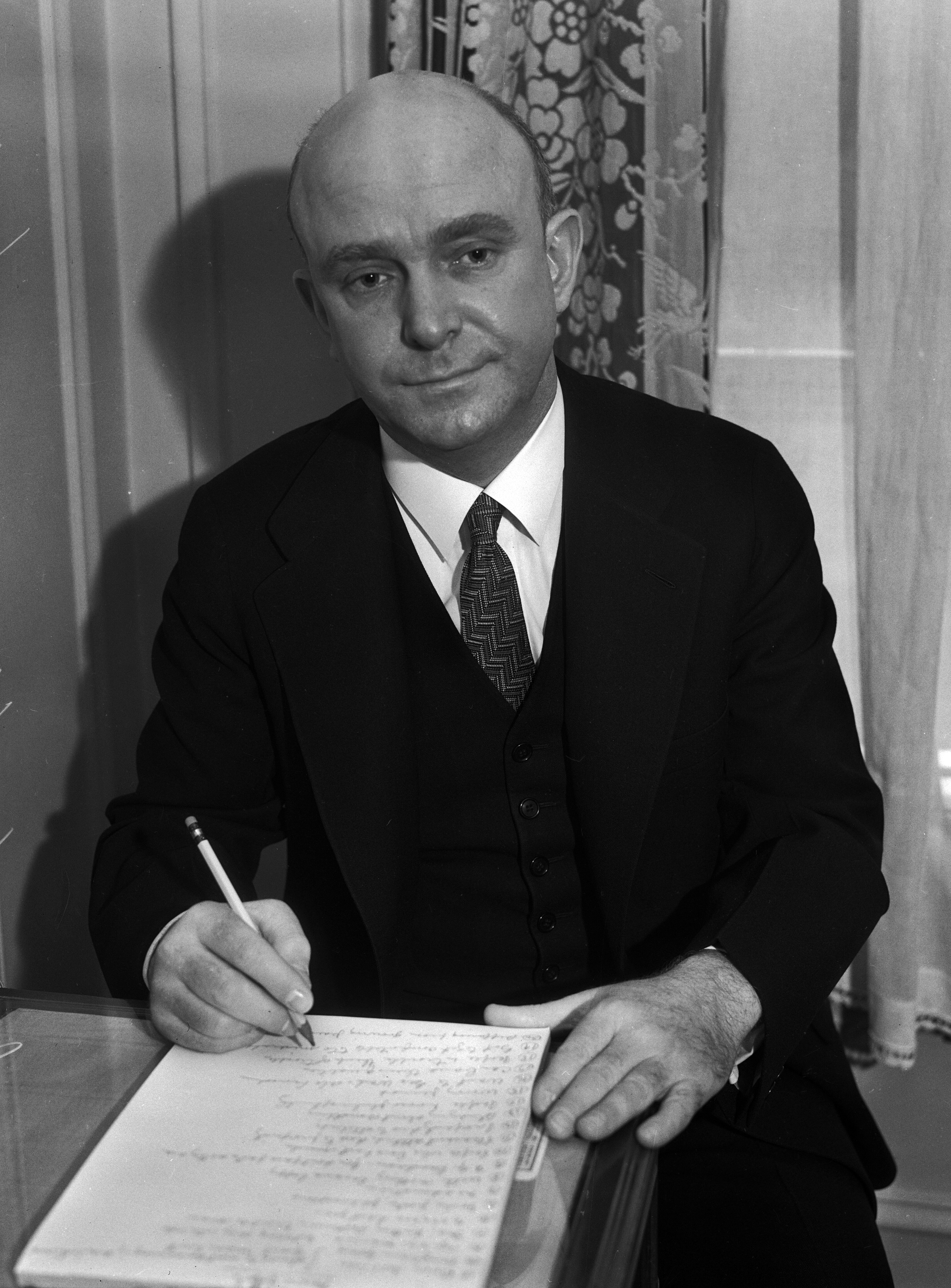
Young in 1936

Vash Young (January 18, 1889 – October 1965) was an American author of motivational and self-improvement books with a popular following during the Great Depression. His writings, especially his last book Fortunes for All reveal much of his early life.

== Early life ==
Vashni Young was born in Salt Lake City on January 18, 1889. Though his first name was Vashni, he preferred Vash throughout his life. His paternal great-grandfather was a brother of Brigham Young and was reputedly instrumental in founding the Mormon settlement. Young's early life was one of deprivation and hardship. His father was more often absent than not, and his mother died when he was only 14. Young's schooling was cut short as he had to help support the family, including three younger siblings, then living with his grandparents. Tragedy struck again when his grandmother died and he left Salt Lake City at 16 years of age to seek his fortune in Chicago where his older brother was then living. He struggled to find employment initially due to his lack of education and basic numeracy. He eventually moved to New York City where he continued to battle depression, self-doubt and failure until the revelation that turned him into a success. His philosophy placed great emphasis on helping others, and a series of books were one expression of this.

== Publications ==
In 1931, Young wrote A Fortune to Share soon after the change in his fortunes; this became a bestseller. This was followed in short order by Let's Start Over Again, No Thank You, The Go-Giver and Be Kind to Yourself, all published by Bobbs-Merrill and written with the aid of co-authors. His last book, Fortunes for All, written much later while Young was in active retirement at the age of 70, was intended to put together the background, philosophy and methods that had secured his fortune as a handbook for generations to follow. Unlike his earlier works, Fortunes for All was entirely his own work.
