= George Ulrich (American geologist) =

American geologist and volcanologist (born 1934)

George Ulrich (born 1934) is an American geologist and volcanologist.

== Biography ==
Ulrich received his PhD in Geology from the University of Colorado in 1963.

On 12 June 1985, while working for the United States Geological Survey as senior geologist of the Hawaiian Volcano Observatory, Ulrich fell through a thin crust of rock and was partially submerged in lava. He was quickly pulled out by a visiting Italian geologist, named Dario Tedesco, but received second and third degree burns on both of his legs and lost a boot. His protective equipment protected his legs from being burned beyond saving; according to Ulrich's account, he suffered no pain at the time as the intense heat of the lava immediately destroyed his nerve endings. The remains of the gear he wore when exposed to the lava is currently on display at Hawai'i Volcanoes National Park.

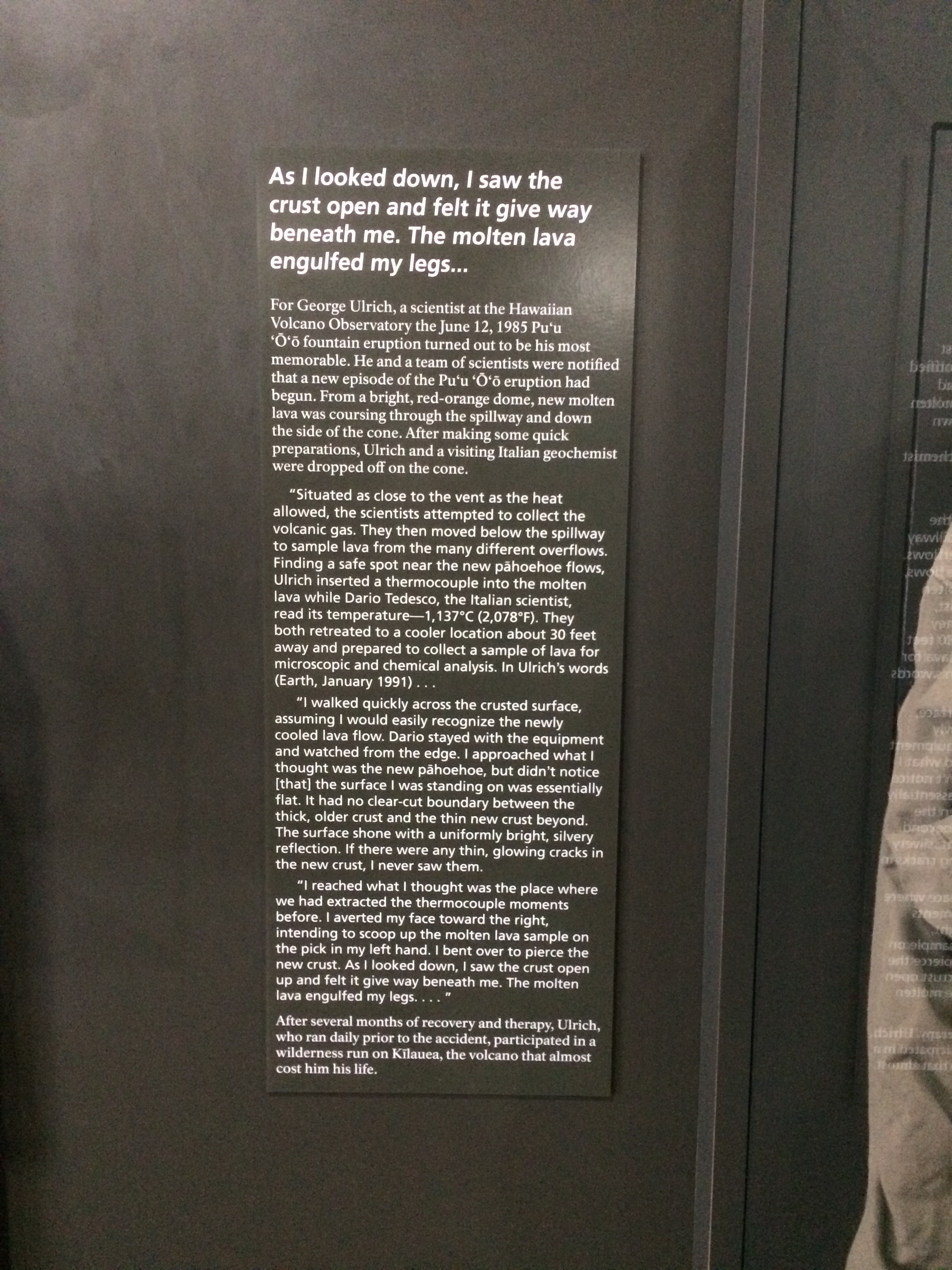
A panel at Volcanoes national park detailing Ulrich's accident.
