= Ulric Nisbet =

British writer

Hugh Ulric Swinscow Nisbet (May 19, 1897 - 1987) was a British writer and the author of Thoughts on the purpose of art (1934), Spread no wings (1937) and Old school tie: recollections of Marlborough before the First World War (1964). Under the pseudonym Hugh Callaway he published The onlie begetter(1936), Bridge to world man (1960), Super-sense: a beginning (1967) and The new consciousness (alternative to chaos) (1971). He also published under the name Pierre Saint Vaast. In The onlie begetter he proposed William Herbert as the dedicatee of Shakespeare's Sonnets.

He married Christine Bacheler Nisbet, a well-known American allegorical artist, who gained her BFA at Yale. In 1929 she married Ulric Nisbet and they settled in Salcombe, Devon.
