= Ulrikke (short story) =

- Short story by Jorge Luis Borges
- Original title: Ulrica
- Country: Argentina
- Language: Spanish
- Genres: Fantasy, short story

Publication
- Published in: The Book of Sand
- Media type: Print
- Publication date: 1975
- Published in English: 1977
- Pages: 5 (Dutton 1977 ed.)

"Ulrikke" (original Spanish title: "Ulrica") is a short story by Argentine writer Jorge Luis Borges, collected in the anthology The Book of Sand. It is notable because it is one of the few of Borges' stories in which women and sex play a central role.

In the story, a professor of Norse mythology is infatuated with a Norwegian woman he meets in Yorkshire. The story alludes to Norse myth as the two refer to each other as Brynhild and Sigurd and walk through "Thorgate". However, the professor is unable to admit his emotions and fully connect with her.

The story begins with the epigram "He took Gram, his sword, and placed its naked blade between the two of them". This epigram, which refers to a sword that separates lovers, is also written on Borges' grave.

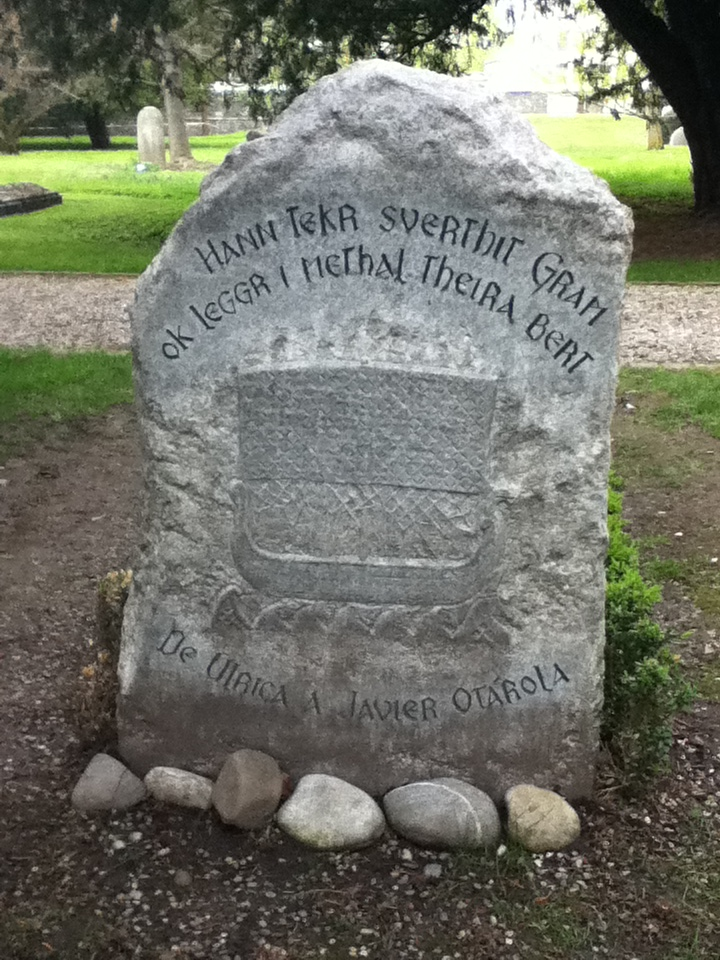
Borges' grave
