= Oldrich Majda =

Slovak artist

Oldrich Majda (5 April 1930 – 2006) was a Slovak artist, painter, illustrator and sculptor.

== Life ==
Majda was born with a heart defect, the doctor's prognosis him a life expectancy of ten years. He already started to paint when he was ten years old. From 1949 to 1953 he studied at the Slovak University of Technology in Bratislava, architecture, and at the Academy of Performing Arts Bratislava, scenography. Until 1968 he worked in various newsrooms in diverse newspapers and magazines as technical and graphical editor. Since the normalization 1970–1990 he was unable to work in the new society and he could no longer exhibit his works for 20 years. He began as a painter and stage builders in the decoration workshop of the Slovak National Theater. In 1970 he leased a piece of land and built there a refuge, where he created most of his sculptures. In the course of further 35 years he dug under his retreat facility catacombs of over 250 m length with rooms and sculptures on the walls. In 1990 he worked as an illustrator, but mostly he devoted himself to his art. After 1990, he had over 40 independent exhibitions abroad and in Slovakia. His artistic path has been very influenced by French Impressionism and Post-Impressionism. Above all he has prevailed as a landscape painter, but also different styles and with the inlaid patchwork; his sculptures are less known.

The number of his works are estimated to be about 4000 examples. Many of his works were donated for charitable purposes such as in Osaka, Japan, under the leadership of Mrs. Matabe. The proceeds went to the Children's Hospital of Lehnice in Slovakia. In 2008 he got the citizen honor – Award of Suchohrad

== Illustrations ==
- Atomy života (English: Atoms of Life) Juraj Bober, Mladé letá publishing house, 1961
- Od kryštálky k tranzistoru (English: From crystals to Transistor) Karol Dubecký, Mladé letá publishing house, 1962, the second part in 1964
- Minerály (English: Minerals) Olga Belešová, Mladé letá publishing house, 1978
- Tiene storočia (English: Shadow of the century) František Višváder, Obzor publishing house, 1989, ISBN 978-80-215-0042-6.
- Kniha Králov (English: Book of Kings) František Višváder with other KLEIO publishing house, 1998, ISBN 978-80-967862-0-6.

== Publications about Oldrich Majda ==
- Stopy v Piesku (English: Footprints in the Sand) Peter Pálfy, 1996 Is a documentary about the catacombs of Oldrich Majda
- Oldrich Majda. (Biography from František Višváder) Michal Vaška publishing house 2008, ISBN 978-80-7165-674-6.
- Encyklopédia Suchohradu -Dimburka (English: Encyclopedia Suchohrad Dimburg) commune office Suchohrad, 2011, ISBN 978-80-970873-1-9.

== Exhibitions ==
- Germany: Tübingen
- France: Vesoul
- Japan: Osaka
- Austria: Vienna
- Czech Republic: Prague
- Slovakia: Bratislava – (Slovak National Museum, Obrazy a plastiky (paintings and sculptures), 1999), Slovakian radio in the Slovak radio building (pyramid), 2009.) Rajec, Šahy, Štúrovo, – (City Gallery J.Barta, 1999) Banská Bystrica, Nitra, Topoľčany, Dunajská Streda, Dubnica nad Váhom – (House of Culture Dubnica nad Váhom, Posol ukrytých Kras (The Messenger of hidden Beauty), 2009) Skalica, – (Záhorské Muzeum Skalica, 1996, 1997, Obrazy a plastiky (paintings and sculptures) 2008.) – (Gallery at Františkánov, Akty a kone (Akt and horses), 2012)
