= Oldřich =

Oldřich is a Czech masculine given name. It may refer to:

- Oldřich, Duke of Bohemia (c. 989–1034 or 1042)
- Oldřich of Olomouc (1134–1177), Duke in Hradec Králové (eastern Bohemia) and Duke of Olomouc
- Oldřich I of Rosenberg (died 1390), Bohemian noble
- Oldřich II of Rosenberg (1403–1462), Bohemian noble
- Oldřich Vavák of Hradec (c. 1375–1421), Czech noble
- Oldřich Blažíček (1887–1953), Czech painter
- Oldřich Blecha (fl. 1933–1934), Czech table tennis player
- Oldřich Černík (1921–1994), Czech politician, Prime Minister of Czechoslovakia from 1968 to 1970
- Oldřich Černý (born 1965), Czech politician
- Oldřich Daněk (1927–2000), Czech dramatist, writer, director and screenwriter
- Oldřich Dědek (born 1953), Czech economist
- Oldřich Duras (1882–1957), Czech chess master
- Oldřich Hamera (1944–2021), Czech printmaker, painter, illustrator, printer, typographer, publisher and restorer
- Oldřich Horák (born 1991), Czech ice hockey player
- Oldřich Janota (1949–2024), Czech singer-songwriter
- Oldřich Kaiser (born 1955), Czech actor
- Oldřich Klimecký (born 1940), Czech entrepreneur, researcher and manager convicted of fraud and money laundering
- Oldřich František Korte (1926–2014), Czech composer, pianist, publicist and writer
- Oldřich Král (1930–2018), Czech sinologist, translator and writer
- Oldřich Kulhánek (1940–2013), Czech painter, graphic designer, illustrator, stage designer and pedagogue
- Oldřich Lajsek (1925–2001), Czech painter, designer, graphic artist and art teacher
- Oldřich Lipský (1924–1986), Czech film director and screenwriter
- Oldřich Lomecký (1920–2011), Czechoslovak sprint canoer
- Oldřich Machač (1946–2011), Czech ice hockey player
- Oldřich Machala (born 1963), Czech football coach and former player
- Oldřich Marek (1911–1986), Czech entomologist and teacher
- Oldřich Navrátil (born 1952), Czech actor
- Oldřich Nejedlý (1909–1990), Czech footballer
- Oldřich Nový (1899–1983), Czech actor, director, composer, dramaturge and singer
- Oldřich Pařízek (born 1972), Czech retired football goalkeeper
- Oldřich Pelčák (1943–2023), Czech cosmonaut and engineer
- Oldřich Rott (born 1951), Czech former footballer
- Oldřich Rulc (1911–1969), Czech footballer
- Oldřich Škácha (1941–2014), Czech photographer and anti-communist dissident
- Oldřich Šváb (1944–2020), Czech-Swiss football coach and player
- Oldřich Svoboda (born 1967), Czech former ice hockey goaltender
- Oldřich Svojanovský (born 1946), Czech retired rower
- Oldřich Vašíček (born 1942), Czech mathematician and quantitative analyst
- Oldřich Velen (1921–2013), Czech actor
- Oldřich Vlasák (1955–2024), Czech politician
- Oldřich Vyhlídal (1921–1989), Czech poet, translator and editor
- Oldřich Zábrodský (1926–2015), Czech ice hockey player

== See also ==
- Oldrich Kotvan (born 1990), Slovak ice hockey player
- Oldrich Majda (1930–2006), Slovak artist, painter, illustrator and sculptor
- Oldřich Oak, Peruc, Czech Republic, a tree estimated to be 1000 years old
