= Ulrich of Bamberg =

German Roman Catholic priest and chronicler

Ulrich of Bamberg was a Roman Catholic priest and chronicler who lived in Bamberg, Germany around 1100.

== Biography ==
Born Udalricus Babenbergensis, he was a canon of Bamberg Cathedral, who lived about 1100 in Bamberg. He is most probably the priest of Bamberg who died on 7 July 1127, who was mentioned frequently in ecclesiastical documents and who bestowed a large trust fund upon the monastery of Michelsberg.

== Literary importance ==
Ulrich's magnum opus was titled in full: Codex epistolaris, continens variorum pontificum et imperatorum Romanorum, ut et S.R.E. cardinalium et S.R.I. principum e cclesiasticorum seculariumque epistolas. This compendium was completed in 1125 and was dedicated to Bishop Gebhard of Würzburg.

The Codex contains letters and charters from the 10th century; it is supposed to be a case book for the education of canon lawyers and public officials, providing sample letters and public documents. These provide "rich material for the history of the relations between the emperors and popes; in particular the letters exchanged by Emperor Lothair, Henry the Proud, and Pope Innocent II give an animated and instructive picture of conditions at that time. These letters also show how the statesmen at the episcopal courts and probably also the bishops were trained."

== See also ==
- Bamberg Cathedral
- Otto of Bamberg

== Literature ==
- Wilhelm Wattenbach (1895). "Ulrich". Allgemeine Deutsche Biographie (in German). Vol. 39. Leipzig: Duncker & Humblot. pp. 244–245.
- Franz Bittner: Ulrich von Bamberg: Eine Bamberger Ars dictandi. In: Bericht des Historischen Vereins für die Pflege der Geschichte des ehemaligen Fürstbistums Bamberg. Nr. 100, 1964, S. 145–171
