= Stabila =

German business

Stabila Messgeräte Gustav Ullrich GmbH
- Company type: GmbH (limited liability company)
- Industry: Measuring Tools manufacturer
- Founded: 1889
- Founder: Gustav Ullrich
- Headquarters: Annweiler am Trifels, Rhineland-Palatinate, Germany
- Key people: Ulrich Dähne
- Products: Spirit levels, electronic measuring tools, lasers, laser distance measurers, folding rulers and tape measures
- Revenue: €88.817 million
- Number of employees: 568 (+64 homeworkers 2023)
- Website: www.stabila.com

Stabila Messgeräte Gustav Ullrich GmbH is a company based in Annweiler am Trifels, Rhineland-Palatinate, Germany, that has been manufacturing measuring tools since 1889. It is specialized in spirit levels, folding rules, and electronic measurement technology. Its products are distributed to over 80 countries. The company was founded by Gustav Ullrich.

== History ==
=== Background ===
In 1820, Leonhard Ullrich founded a trading business in Maikammer, Germany, which he later passed on to his sons. During the economic crisis starting in 1850, Anton Ullrich, together with his brother Franz, began manufacturing folding rules. In 1886, the spring joint of the folding rule was patented by the two brothers. This innovation established them as the inventors of the modern folding rule as it is known today.

=== Foundation and early years ===
In 1889, Gustav Ullrich, a son of Franz Ullrich, moved to Annweiler, where he acquired land totaling 16,070 m^{2} east of the Bernsbacher Mühle (Kabigmühle). This land included the factory buildings of a former straw manufactory, whose main building, shaped like a U, still stands today. Shortly after the purchase, he established the metre factory on the site, although the exact founding date remains unclear. The first official mention dates to October 25, 1889.

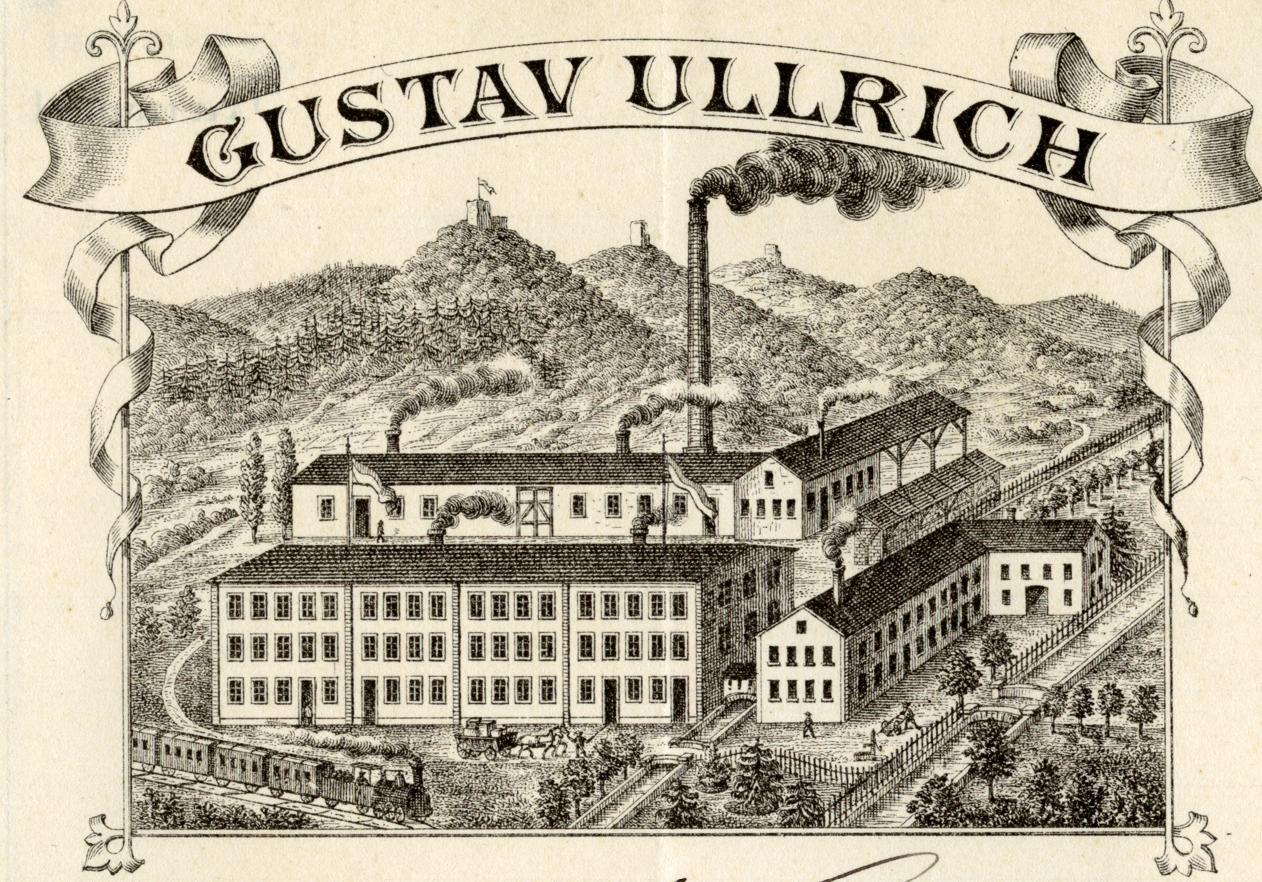
Gustav Ullrich Metre Factory, depicted on a letterhead dated 25 November 1890, is the building of the former straw manufactory, modified in the illustration. The structure is not shown in its actual U-shape but rather in an altered form.

Initially, the product range included spirit levels, measuring sticks, tape measures, and plumb bobs, along with various iron goods such as comptoir hooks.

In 1890, the establishment of the sister company Franz Ullrich Söhne, originally an auxiliary branch of the Gebrüder Ullrich firm in Maikammer, was completed. Subsequently, a workers' settlement was constructed west of the metre factory. Consisting initially of nine buildings, this settlement was erected between 1890 and 1898. These buildings, with the exception of three that have since been demolished, still exist today and continue to serve as residential housing.

=== Company expansion ===
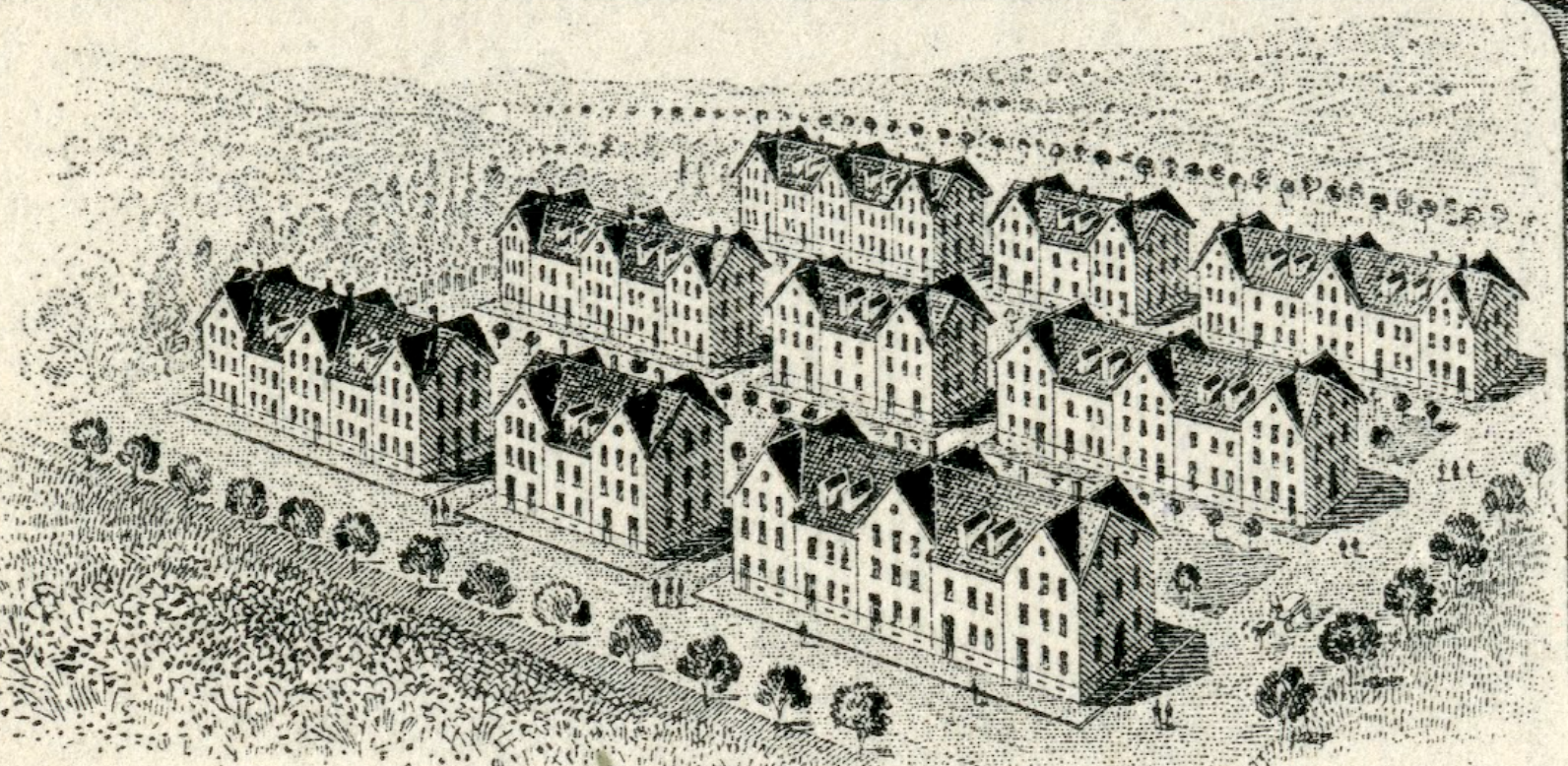
Worker Housing circa 1900

Gustav Ullrich expanded the business by adding additional buildings and external locations as the available space became insufficient. He purchased the Neumühle in Annweiler for the production of tape measures and established an external facility in Châlons-sur-Marne, France, to procure wood supplies.

A rail connection was soon added to serve both enterprises, enabling exports to destinations as far as Russia.

=== First World War and the interwar period ===
With the onset of the First World War, Gustav Ullrich's further construction projects could not be continued. During the war, the meter factory fell into a deep economic crisis. This was primarily due to the relatively quick loss of its branch in France, which had been an important source for wood supplies. Additionally, some of the factory buildings were used as a military hospital. Production resumed only slowly, especially since the French branch had been confiscated. In 1929, the brand name "Stabila" was registered.

=== Second World War ===
During the Second World War, Stabila was not utilized for military production, which, among other factors, spared the company from post-war dismantling. However, the production of measuring instruments faced severe difficulties due to material shortages and the conscription of nearly the entire workforce in 1944 for fortification work on the Siegfried Line. Eventually, production nearly came to a complete halt.

On January 1, 1945, an air raid targeted Annweiler, specifically bombing both factories in the area. While the enamel factory suffered far greater damage, Stabila's archives were hit by an incendiary bomb, causing destruction. Additionally, the shock waves from the explosions stripped tiles from the buildings. After the war, two unexploded bombs were discovered on the factory premises.

=== Post-war period ===
In 1948, Günther Leipold, the grandson of Gustav Ullrich, became a personally liable partner and managing director of the company. At this time, spirit levels began to be manufactured not only from wood but also from aluminum die-casting and, eventually, primarily from aluminum profiles.

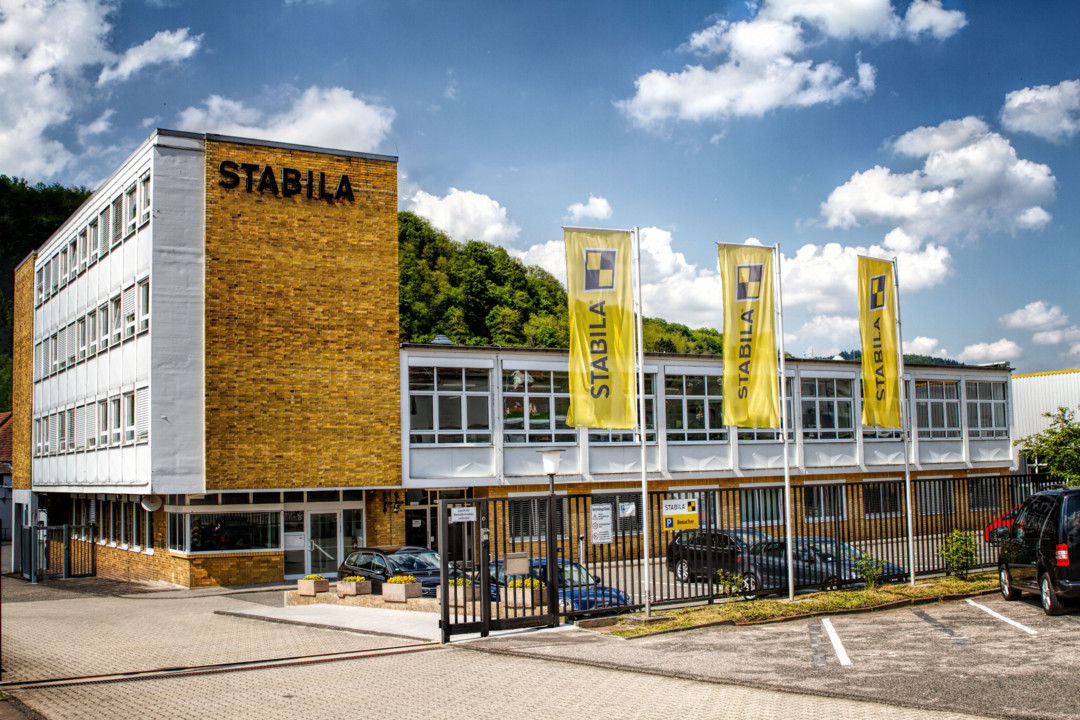
STABILA headquarters in Annweiler am Trifels, 2022

In 1952, the company acquired a patent for the acrylic glass vial, and in 1979, a patent for an innovative method of vial assembly. Since then, vials have been permanently cast into the profile body of the yellow-colored spirit levels, ensuring long-term measurement precision ("Locked Vials").

During the 1960s, a new administrative building was constructed, which still serves as the main entrance to the factory today.

In 1993, Stabila began manufacturing folding rules in Haluzice, Czech Republic. However, the production of precision tools and the printing of folding rules for promotional purposes remained at the Annweiler headquarters. In the mid-1990s, the company also began manufacturing laser measuring devices at this location.

In 2011, a new production facility for line lasers was established in China as part of a joint venture with a majority stake held by Stabila. Over the years, the company expanded its distribution network with subsidiary companies in Chicago (United States, 1997), Shenzhen (China, 2018), Sydney (Australia, 2018), Italy (2019), and the United Kingdom (2021).

To this day, the company remains owned by the descendants of its founder, Gustav Ullrich. Since April 2014, Ulrich Dähne has served as the managing director.

==== Logistics Center in Hauenstein ====
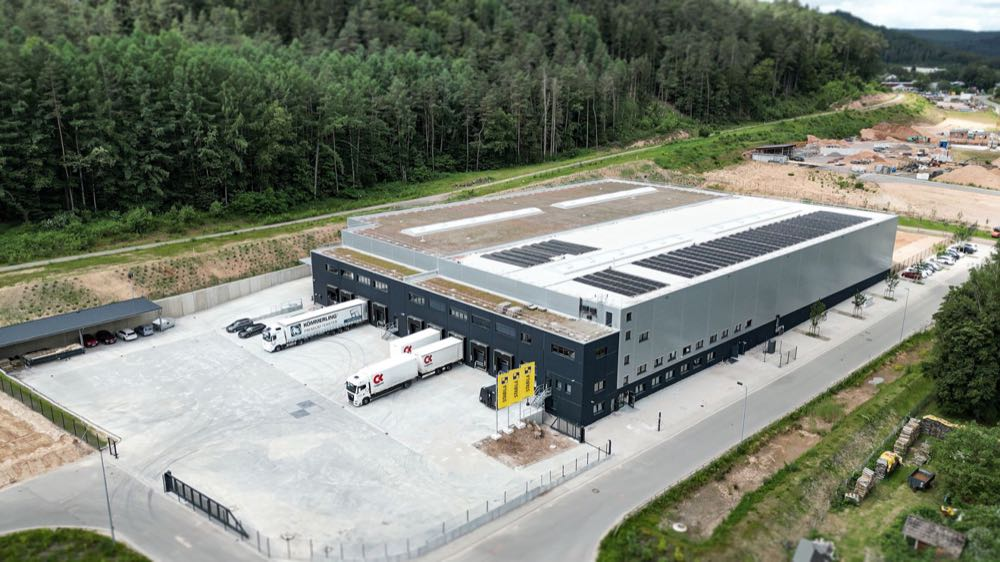
Newly launched logistics centre in Hauenstein, 2024

Due to increasing space constraints at the Annweiler headquarters, Stabila decided in 2022 to construct a logistics center in the new development area of Hauenstein/Wilgartswiesen. According to the company, this facility will create approximately 35 new jobs and provide space for potential future investments. In the summer of 2024, the logistics center was inaugurated by the management. The facility consists of a hall with a total area of 7,500 m^{2} and has since commenced operations.

== Products ==
- Spirit levels
- Folding rules
- Tape measures
- Laser measuring devices

An important business segment is the custom printing of wooden folding rules as promotional items. This segment is managed by a dedicated sales team.

== Youth development ==
For many years, Stabila has been actively involved in promoting youth development and maintains close ties with vocational schools and training centers in the construction trade. Since 2015, the company has been a member of WorldSkills Germany, sponsoring national and international professional competitions such as EuroSkills and WorldSkills. Through targeted campaigns on its social media channels, Stabila aims to engage younger audiences, increase the appeal of skilled trades, and encourage women to pursue careers in the trades. Campaigns such as "Be a True Pro" and "True Pro Ladies" are examples of these efforts.

== Awards ==
Since 2012, Stabila has been annually honored by the Central Association of the Hardware Trade with the Partner of Specialized Trade award in the measuring tools category.
