= Ullrich =

Ullrich (German pronunciation: [ˈʊlʁɪç]), is a surname of Germanic origin. Other variants include Ulrich, Ulrych/Ullrych, Ulryk/Ullryk, and many more.

Notable people with the surname include:

- Alexander Ulrich (born 1971), German politician
- Anton Ullrich (1826–1895), German industrialist and inventor
- Artur Ullrich, German footballer
- Axel Ullrich (born 1943), German cancer researcher
- Bruce Ullrich (born 1938), New Zealand sports administrator
- Carl F. Ullrich (1928-2023), US athletics administrator
- Cornelia Ullrich (born 1963), German hurdler
- Dave Ullrich, Canadian musician and entrepreneur
- Egon Ullrich^{(de)} (1902–1957), German mathematician
- Frank Ullrich (born 1958), German biathlete and Olympic medalist
- Franz Ullrich (1830–1891), German industrialist
- Gerald Ullrich (born 1962), German politician
- Gustav Ullrich (1860-1938), German industrialist
- Jan Ullrich (born 1973), German professional road bicycle racer
- Karl Ullrich (1910–1996), German commander
- Kay Ullrich (1943–2021), Scottish politician
- Logan Ullrich (born 2000), New Zealand rower
- Luise Ullrich (1910-1985), Austrian actress
- Lukas Ullrich, (born 2004) German footballer
- Oliver Ullrich, (born 1970) Swiss aerospace physician and gravitational biologist
- Sandy Ullrich (1921–2001), Cuban professional baseball pitcher
- Stephanie Ullrich (born 1984), German football goalkeeper
- Volker Ullrich (born 1943), German historian, journalist and writer
- Volker Ullrich (born 1975), German politician
- Wolfgang Ullrich, (born 1950) Austrian head of Audi Motorsport

== See also ==
- Ulrich
- Ulric (disambiguation)
- Ulrici
- Ultsch
- Utz (name)
