= Urch =

Urch is an English-language surname that may be derived from Urchfont, a village in Wiltshire. Variant spellings include Ullrich, Ulrich and Ulrik. It may refer to:

- Callum Urch (born 1984), Australian rules footballer
- Edith Urch (1915–1978), English nurse and charity worker
- Reginald Urch (1884–1945), English author and journalist
- Tyrone Urch (born 1965), British army officer
