= Gustav Ullrich =

German industrialist

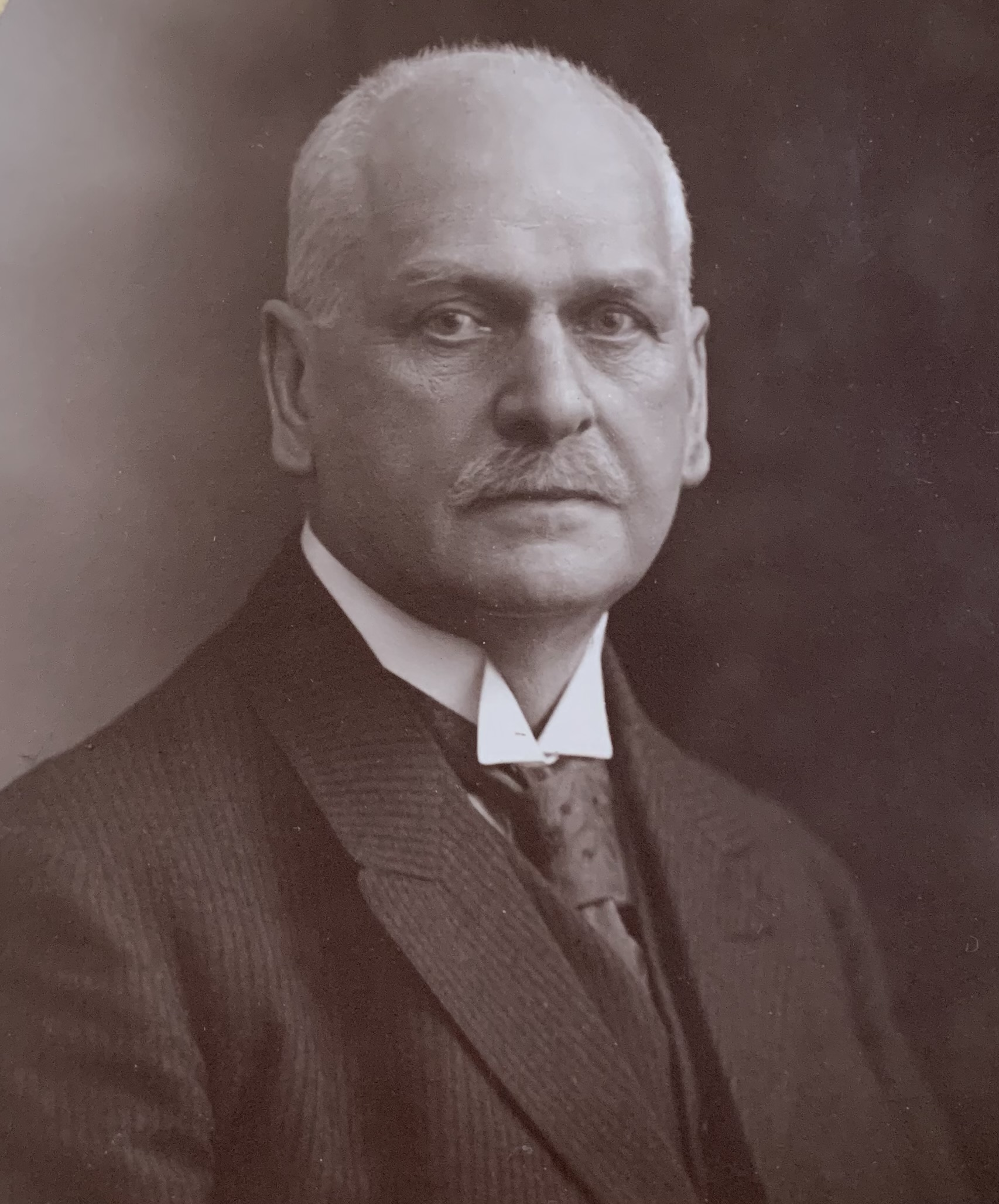
- Born: 11 February 1860; Maikammer, Rhineland-Palatinate, Germany
- Died: 21 February 1938 (aged 78); Annweiler am Trifels, Rhineland-Palatinate, Germany
- Burial place: Annweiler am Trifels
- Occupations: Entrepreneur, industrialist
- Spouse: Marie Janson (m. 1888)
- Children: 6
- Parents: Franz Ullrich (father); Eva Katharina Schmitt (mother)
- Relatives: Anton Ullrich (uncle)

Gustav Franz Ullrich (11 February 1860 – 21 February 1938) was a German entrepreneur, industrialist, and founder of the enamelling factory ASTA-Emaille-Fabrik as well as the company Stabila Messgeräte Gustav Ullrich GmbH, which still exists today. He was also an honorary citizen of the town of Annweiler am Trifels, Germany.

== Early life ==
=== Background ===
Gustav Ullrich came from a family that had moved from Diedesfeld to Maikammer around 1800. His father was Franz Ullrich, the brother of the inventor Anton Ullrich. Together, the Ullrich brothers developed the joint spring lock for folding rulers, which they patented in 1886.

=== Childhood and youth ===
Gustav Ullrich began attending primary school in Maikammer at the age of five. He later attended a Latin School in Edenkoben. Afterward, he completed a brief internship with his father's enamelling company before being sent as an intern to Épernay (Marne) for one year to gain further experience. He later returned to his hometown and joined the family business.

== Career ==
=== Entrepreneurial career ===
At the age of 29, Ullrich decided to forge his own path. In 1889, he moved to Annweiler am Trifels, where he purchased 16,070 m^{2} of land east of the Bernsbacher Mühle (Kabigmühle), which included the factory buildings of a former straw manufacturing facility. That same year, he established a factory for wooden folding rulers, which he quickly expanded to include levels, tape measures, and other measuring tools. The company was later renamed Stabila which continues to exist under this name today.

In 1890, he acquired additional land and built a new 2,000 m^{2} hall next to the existing factory for the production of metal goods. This later became the company Franz Ullrich Söhne, an enamel, metal, and stamping plant. The company was later renamed Annweiler Email- und Metallwerke vormals Franz Ullrich Söhne and, in 1952, became ASTA (Annweiler Stahl). Between 1890 and 1898, workers' housing was constructed next to the measuring tool factory.

Under his leadership, additional branches were either acquired or newly established. For example, an external galvanizing plant was built in Bellheim, and the Neumühle facility served as a production site for measuring tools. An additional branch for procuring wood was established in Châlons-sur-Marne in France, although it was confiscated during the First World War. The company developed into the largest of its kind in Europe and at times employed up to 1,000 workers.

Through the construction of the rail connection to the two factories and through Gustav Ullrich’s travels, which extended as far as the Russian Empire, the internationalisation of the market received a tremendous boost. This led, among other things, to Ullrich receiving in 1895 an order to manufacture the “Coronation Cups” (also known as the Khodynka Cup of Sorrows), which were intended for the coronation of the Russian Tsar Nicholas II. For logistical reasons, part of the production took place in the Maikammer factory, as well as in other enamel factories in Germany and Austria.

World War I disrupted many of Gustav Ullrich's future plans. Among his uncompleted projects were a foundry in Annweiler at the Herrenteich, for which he had already acquired land, and the construction of a cold rolling mill near Germersheim with its own loading dock.

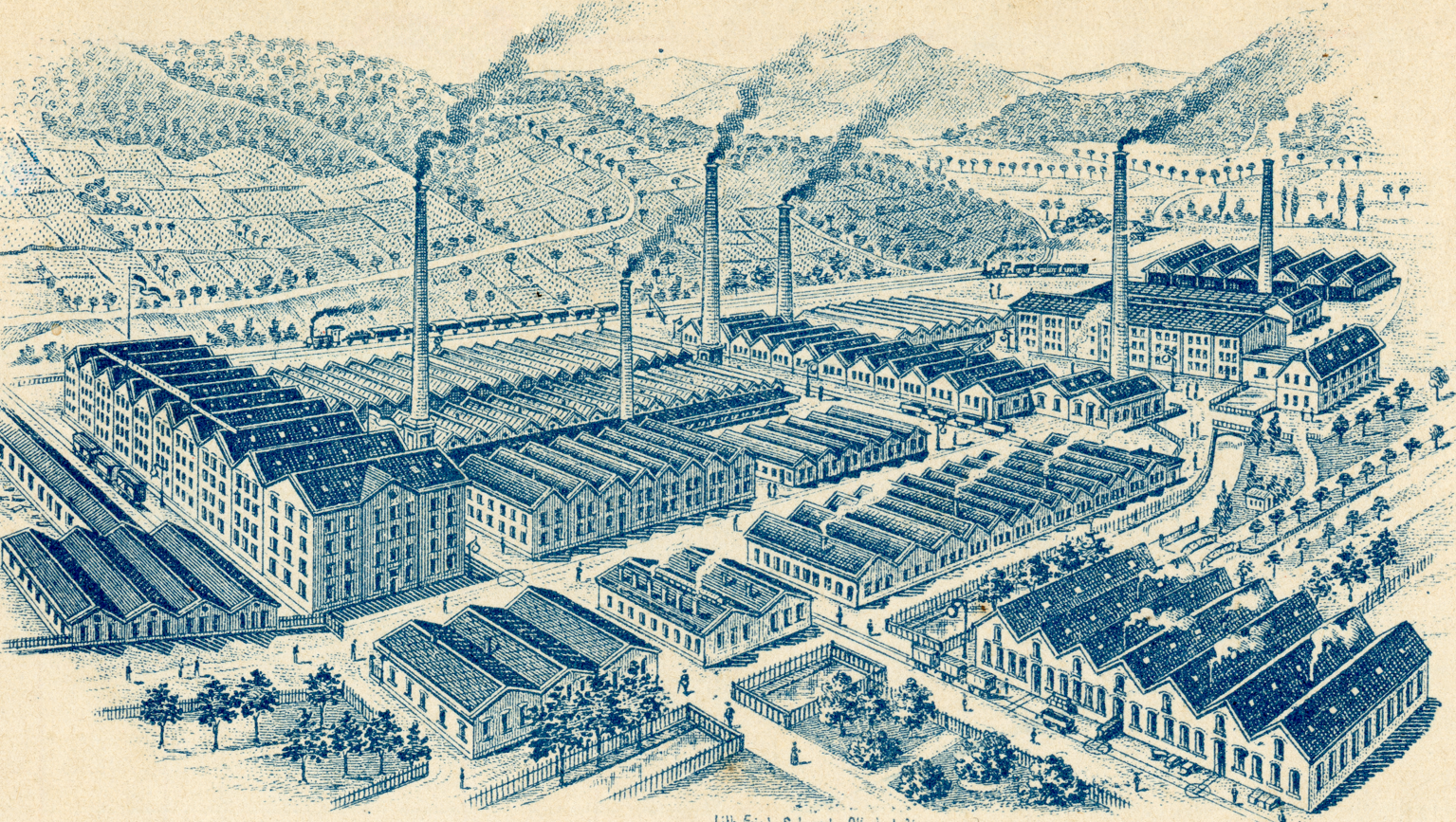
Annweiler enamel and measuring tool factories circa 1890

=== Military service ===
After returning from his traineeship in France, Ullrich served as a one-year volunteer with the 1st Squadron of the 2nd Royal Bavarian Uhlan Regiment in Ansbach from 1 October 1878 until 30 September 1879, He was promoted to Vice Sergeant Major of the Reserve with the commendation "outstanding conduct." After his first reserve exercise, he was promoted to Lieutenant of the Reserve.

On September 23, 1914, he reported to the 2nd Train Battalion in Würzburg. In January 1915, he went to the Western Front as the commander of the 8th Medical Company. By April 1916, he had been promoted to Major of the Reserve and became the commander of a medical battalion on the front.

=== Post War career ===
In 1919, Ullrich appointed his son-in-law, Eugen Berthold (1882–1949), to the board of the enamel factory in Annweiler instead of his son. His son, Franz, a pilot, had tragically died in a plane crash during a training exercise near Traunstein on 10 November 1918, a day before the signing of the Armistice.

In 1925, Gustav Ullrich suffered from a severe thrombosis that confined him to bed for six months until the summer of 1926, preventing him from managing major business operations. Additionally, in the autumn of 1930, he suffered a stroke, from which he did not fully recover until five years later. Due to his health issues, he granted Berthold general power of attorney on 7 July 1928.

When Gustav Ullrich died in 1938, Eugen Berthold became the general representative for both companies. The two companies continued operating until after World War II by Ullrich's two grandsons. The enamel factory was later acquired by Fissler, Stabila remains owned by Gustav Ullrich's descendants to the present day.

== Personal life ==
In 1888, Gustav Ullrich married Marie Janson (1864–1947) from Harxheim, who came from a Mennonite family. They had six children together. Her uncle was Reichstag member Jean Janson, and her cousin was winery owner and Reichstag member Heinrich Janson.

== Recognition and memberships ==
From 1895 to 1920, Gustav Ullrich first belonged to the municipal representatives’ council and then to the city council. He was a member of the district council and chairman of the Industrie- und Handelskammer für die Pfalz in Ludwigshafen. Furthermore, from June 24, 1927, he served as a board member of the Verband pfälzischer Industrieller and held the same office in the Tourism Association.

On March 12, 1911, he was appointed as a Kommerzienrat (Commercial Councillor), and on December 22, 1924, he was elevated to a Geheimer Kommerzienrat (Privy Commercial Councillor). In 1918, Ullrich was awarded the Bavarian Order of Merit of St. Michael, 4th Class with Crown.

In addition, on his 75th birthday, February 11, 1935, he was made an honorary citizen of the city of Annweiler.

== Legacy ==
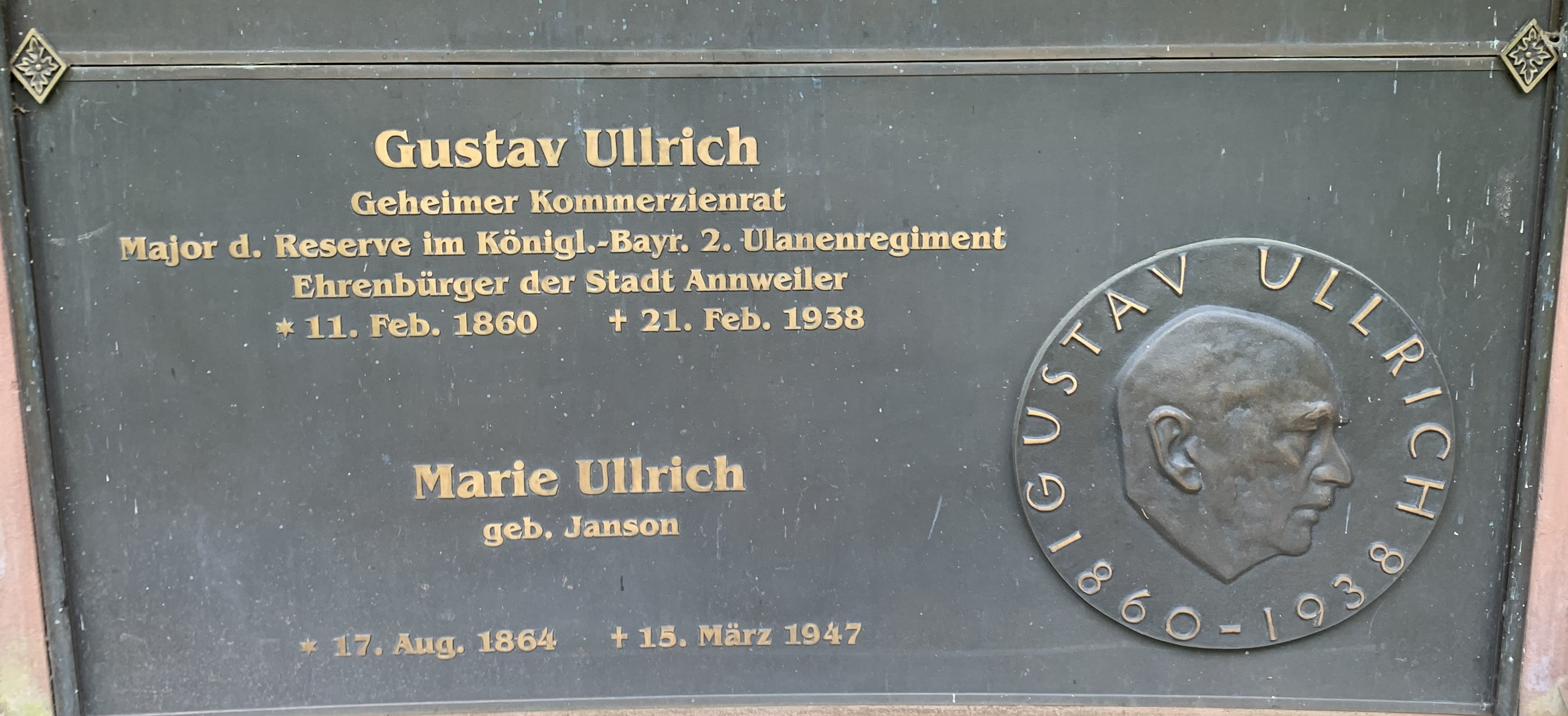
Grave of Gustav Ullrich and his wife in Annweiler

Streets in both Bellheim, near the former branch plant, and Annweiler are named after him.

His grave and the associated Ullrich family burial site are located in the cemetery in Annweiler.
