= Mark, Somerset =

Village in Somerset, England

Coordinates: 51.225°N 2.894°W

Mark
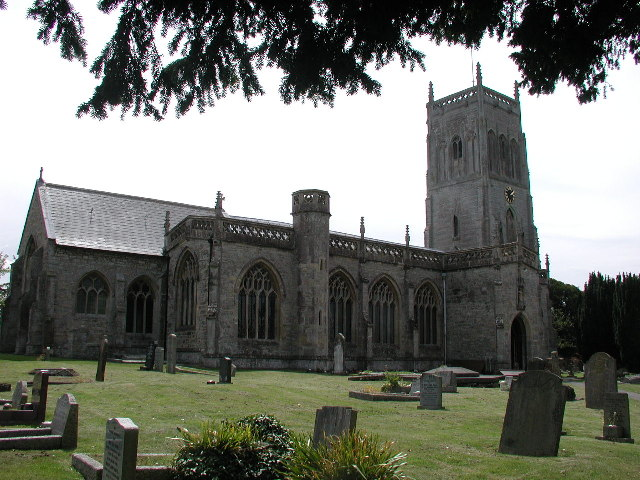
- Parish Church of St Mark (or Holy Cross)

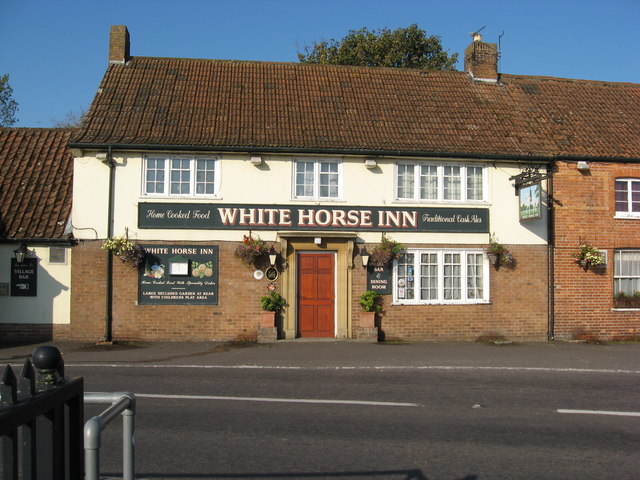
- White Horse Inn

- Location within Somerset
- Population: 1,478
- OS grid reference: ST376477
- Unitary authority: Somerset Council
- Ceremonial county: Somerset
- Region: South West
- Country: England
- Sovereign state: United Kingdom
- Post town: Highbridge
- Postcode district: TA9
- Dialling code: 01278
- Police: Avon and Somerset
- Fire: Devon and Somerset
- Ambulance: South Western
- UK Parliament: Wells and Mendip Hills

Mark is a village and civil parish which lies approximately 10 miles (16 km) from Bridgwater, 5 miles (8 km) from Axbridge, and 4 miles (6.4 km) from Highbridge in the county of Somerset, England. It includes the hamlets of Yarrow and Southwick. The Mark Yeo river has its source near the village.

Mark is home to two pubs, a village hall, a village stores and post office, the Ki-Aikido Federation of Great Britain and many clubs and societies, including a Youth Theatre group.

== History ==
The origin of the name is believed to mean A boundary of property from the Old English mærc.

The estate was given to the Bishop of Wells by Edith of Wessex and with Wedmore was used to endow the deanery of Wells Cathedral by 1157 and continued until 1547.

Mark was part of the hundred of Bempstone.

== Governance ==
The parish council has responsibility for local issues, including setting an annual precept (local rate) to cover the council's operating costs and producing annual accounts for public scrutiny. The parish council evaluates local planning applications and works with the local police, district council officers, and neighbourhood watch groups on matters of crime, security, and traffic. The parish council's role also includes initiating projects for the maintenance and repair of parish facilities, as well as consulting with the district council on the maintenance, repair, and improvement of highways, drainage, footpaths, public transport, and street cleaning. Conservation matters (including trees and listed buildings) and environmental issues are also the responsibility of the council.

For local government purposes, since 1 April 2023, the village comes under the unitary authority of Somerset Council. Prior to this, it was part of the non-metropolitan district of Sedgemoor, which was formed on 1 April 1974 under the Local Government Act 1972, having previously been part of Axbridge Rural District.

It is also part of the Wells and Mendip Hills county constituency represented in the House of Commons of the Parliament of the United Kingdom. It elects one Member of Parliament (MP) by the first past the post system of election.

== Religious sites ==
The Parish Church of St Mark (or Holy Cross) dates from the 13th century, but is mainly 14th and 15th century, with further restoration in 1864. It has been designated by English Heritage as a Grade I listed building. The former market cross in the churchyard dates from the 15th century.

The Methodist Chapel on The Causeway dates from 1797.

== Education ==
The educational system in the Cheddar Valley consists of First Schools for children between the ages of 4 and 9, two Middle Schools (ages 9 to 13) and a Secondary School for pupils up to the age of 18 years. Children from Mark may attend Mark First School, Hugh Sexey Middle School in Blackford, and The Kings of Wessex Academy in Cheddar.

Mark is home to Mark College, a private boarding secondary school for students with Asperger syndrome or high-functioning autism.

== Notable residents ==
- John Allen Giles (1808–1884), historian, was born at Southwick House in Mark.
- Reginald Urch (1884–1945), author and journalist, was born in Mark.
