= St Mark's Church, Mark =

Church in Somerset, England

Church of St Mark
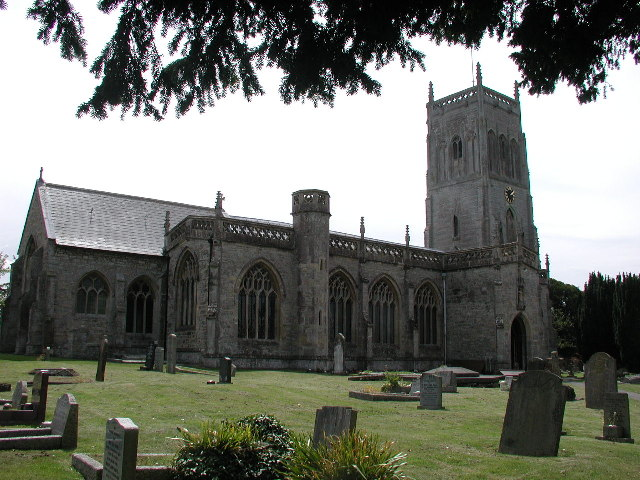

- Location within Somerset

General information
- Location: Mark, Somerset, England
- Coordinates: 51.2262°N 2.8883°W
- Completed: 13th century

The Church of St Mark (also known as Holy Cross) in Mark, Somerset, England dates from the 13th century, but is mainly a 14th and 15th century building with further restoration in 1864. It has been designated as a Grade I listed building.

There may have been a chapel in the village from the 12th century however the current church was dedicated by William, Bishop of Bath and Wells in April 1268 as The Church of the Holy Cross. The title changed with a new dedication to St Mark in 1853 but reverted to the earlier dedication in 1939. The building was expanded over the subsequent centuries. The nave has a Barrel roof decorated with the heads of religious figures. In the Choir is a wooden sculpture of the Four Evangelists made by a Belgian sculptor named André in 1524 for St. Salvator's Cathedral in Bruges, which was moved in 1794.

The tower was built around 1407. It contains a peel of eight bells. The clock celebrates the jubilee of Queen Victoria in 1887.

The former market cross in the churchyard dates from the 15th century.

The parish is part of the benefice of Mark with Allerton within the Axbridge deanery.

== See also ==
- Grade I listed buildings in Sedgemoor
- List of Somerset towers
- List of ecclesiastical parishes in the Diocese of Bath and Wells
