= Maikammer (Verbandsgemeinde) =

- Verbandsgemeinde
- Location of Maikammer within Südliche Weinstraße district
- Interactive map of Maikammer
- Location within Germany Location within Rhineland-Palatinate
- Coordinates: 49°18′N 8°08′E
- Country: Germany
- State: Rhineland-Palatinate
- District: Südliche Weinstraße
- Seat: Maikammer
- Subdivisions: 3 municipalities

Area
  - Total: 39.72 km^{2} (15.34 sq mi)

Population (2025-12-31)
  - Total: 8,165
  - Density: 205.6/km^{2} (532.4/sq mi)
- Time zone: UTC+01:00 (CET)
  - Summer (DST): UTC+02:00 (CEST)
- Website: www.vg-maikammer.de//

Maikammer is a Verbandsgemeinde ("collective municipality") in the Südliche Weinstraße district, in Rhineland-Palatinate, Germany. The seat of the municipality is in Maikammer. On 1 July 2014 it merged into the Verbandsgemeinde Edenkoben, but this merger was reverted by the constitutional court of Rhineland-Palatinate in June 2015.

The Verbandsgemeinde Maikammer consists of the following Ortsgemeinden ("local municipalities"):

1. Kirrweiler
2. Maikammer
3. Sankt Martin
