= Franz Ullrich =

German industrialist

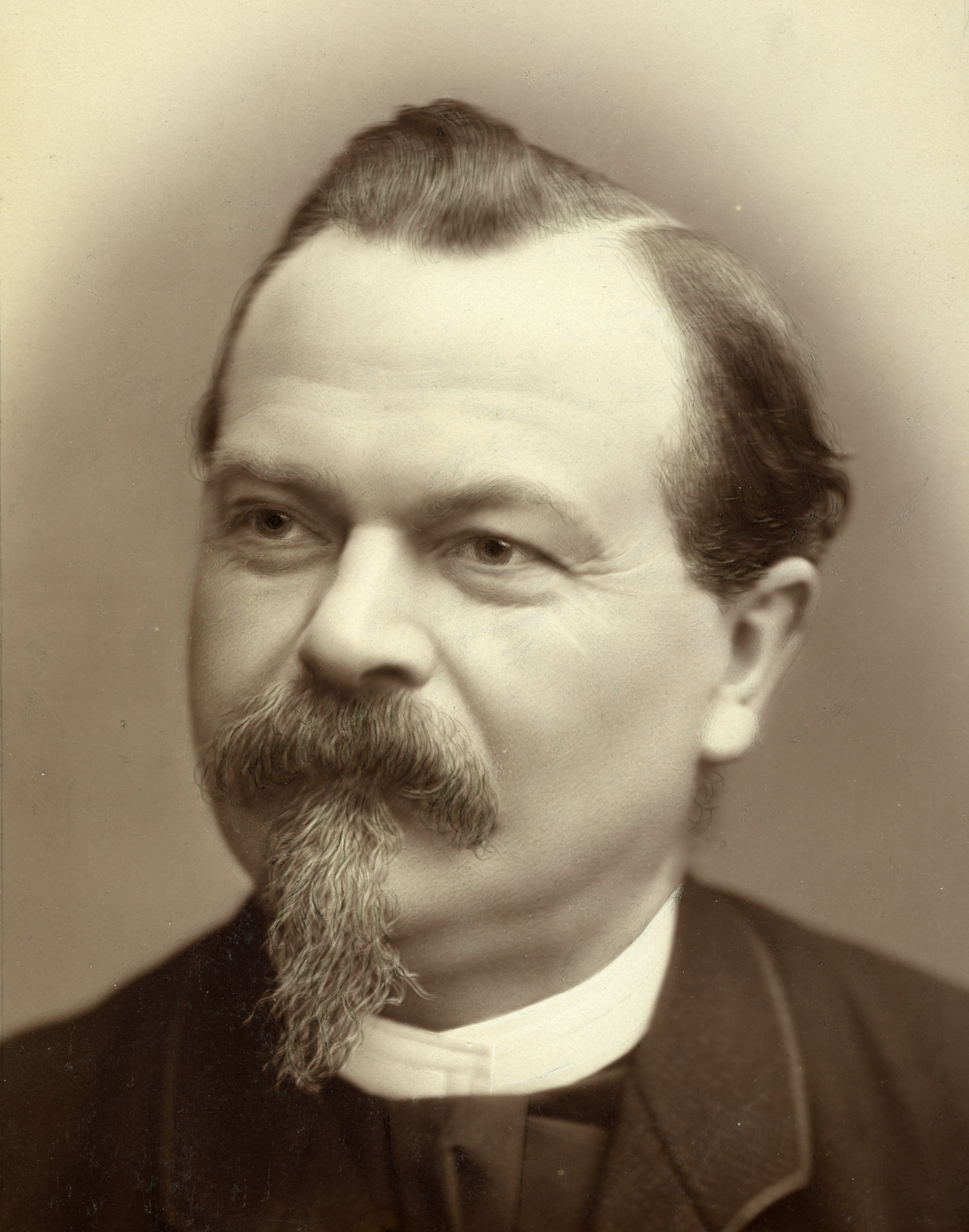
- Born: 22 July 1830; Maikammer, Rhineland-Palatinate, Germany
- Died: 21 December 1891 (aged 61); Maikammer, Rhineland-Palatinate, Germany
- Burial place: Annweiler am Trifels, Rhineland-Palatinate, Germany
- Spouse: Eva Katharina Schmitt (m. 1857)
- Children: 6, including Gustav Ullrich
- Parents: Leonhard Ullrich (father); Regina Damm (mother)
- Relatives: Anton Ullrich (brother)

Franz Ullrich (22 July 1830 – 21 December 1891) was a German industrialist, inventor, winery owner, entrepreneur, and co-founder of the enamelling factory Gebrüder Ullrich in the town of Maikammer, Germany.

Together with his brother Anton Ullrich, he developed a patent for a joint spring lock in folding rulers, which enabled measurements in horizontal and vertical positions without the rulers collapsing. His son, Gustav Ullrich, later became a prominent entrepreneur.

== Life and work ==
=== Origin and youth ===
Franz Ullrich was the youngest of seven siblings. He was the son of Leonhard Ullrich (1793–1838), an internationally active merchant, and his wife, Regina Damm. Leonhard ran a business dealing in colonial goods and textiles at what is now Sankt Martiner Straße 5 in Maikammer.

=== Entrepreneurial activities ===
==== Beginnings ====
After joining the expanding family business run by his brother Anton, the space became insufficient. Franz completed a four-year banking course in Neustadt an der Weinstraße, and together they built the first factory hall on the Dieterwiesen grounds. By the 1870s, they began experiments with the enamelling of tin raw materials.

On November 17, 1857, Franz married Eva Katharina Schmitt in Maikammer, while Anton married her sister.

==== Gebrüder Ullrich Enamel Factory ====
In 1877, they succeeded and founded the first enameling plant on the Dieterwiesen in a 2600 m² hall. The plant started operations in 1880.

The company expanded rapidly and had to build additional facilities by 1884, employing 250 workers that same year.

The demand for labor attracted many families to Maikammer, altering the social structure of the predominantly Catholic town as Protestant families settled there, leading to the establishment of a Lutheran church. The factory provided the primary source of income for many households, although viticulture and agriculture remained secondary occupations. The town’s appearance also changed with the construction of a factory complex and nearby worker housing.

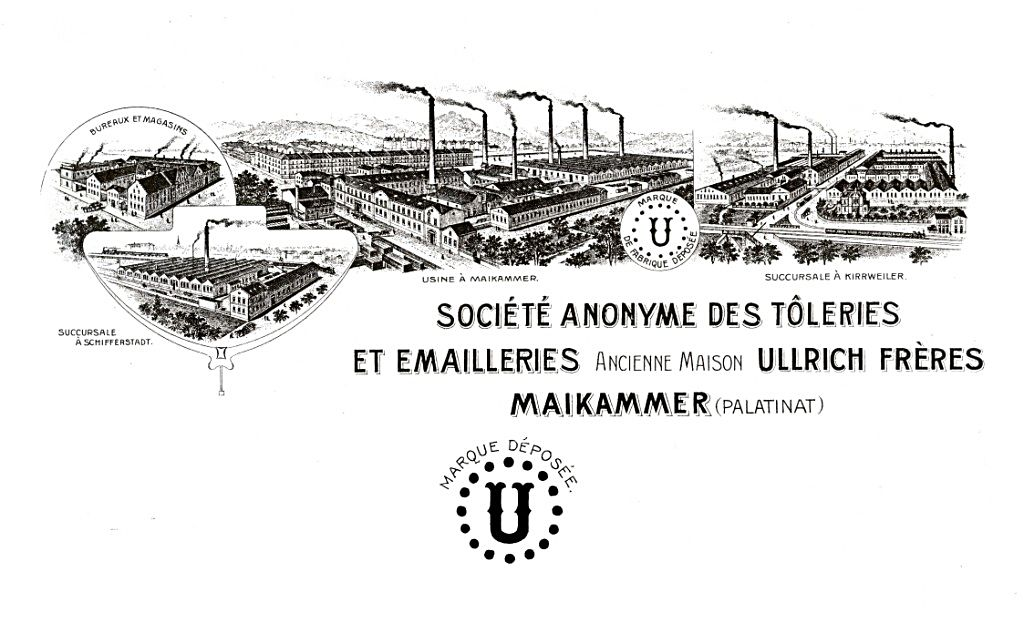
Gebrüder Ullrich Factory Sights

Due to a shortage of local labor and raw materials, Franz Ullrich and his sons Gustav and August sought a location for another factory. In 1889, Gustav established a measuring instrument factory in Annweiler am Trifels, now known as Stabila.

Eventually, they decided to build an additional enamel factory in Annweiler. In 1890, the company Gebrüder Ullrich split into two: Franz Ullrich Söhne (later ASTA-Emaille-Fabrik) and Emaillier- & Stanzwerke vormals Gebrüder Ullrich. Franz Ullrich and his sons Gustav and August relocated to Annweiler to manage the new company. The firm was entered into the commercial register in Maikammer on 24 April, 1890, and transformed into a joint-stock company. The Annweiler factory was officially founded on 29 November, 1890.

Anton Ullrich and his son remained in Maikammer to manage Emaillier- & Stanzwerke vormals Gebrüder Ullrich, while Franz's eldest son, Eugen, stayed to run the family vineyard.

After the brothers parted ways, the companies grew more independent. Eventually, Gustav Ullrich became the sole owner.

The Maikammer firm suffered severe economic losses during World War I, ceasing ruler production in 1918. Following Anton's son August's death in 1927, the company went bankrupt in 1928.

Franz Ullrich lived in Annweiler am Trifels until his death in Maikammer in 1891.

== Factory sites ==
The operation run by Anton Ullrich was continuously expanded, leading to the establishment of an enameling plant in Schifferstadt in 1887 and the acquisition of the bankrupt stamping and enameling plant of the Kessler brothers in neighboring Kirrweiler in 1904.

Parts of the plant, including a chimney, are still preserved today. Bellheim was added as a galvanizing facility for the Annweiler plant in 1910/1911.

In Maikammer itself, several buildings have been preserved, including the workers' housing.

- Annweiler am Trifels, Germany
- Bellheim, Germany
- Châlons-en-Champagne, France
- Kirrweiler, Germany
- Maikammer, Germany
- Schifferstadt, Germany

== Awards ==
- 1893 Gold Medal – Kaiserslautern
- 1895 Gold Medal – Landau
- 1895 Medal – Strassbourg
- 1895 Gold Medal – Ulm
- 1896 Gold Medal – Nuremberg

== Commemoration ==
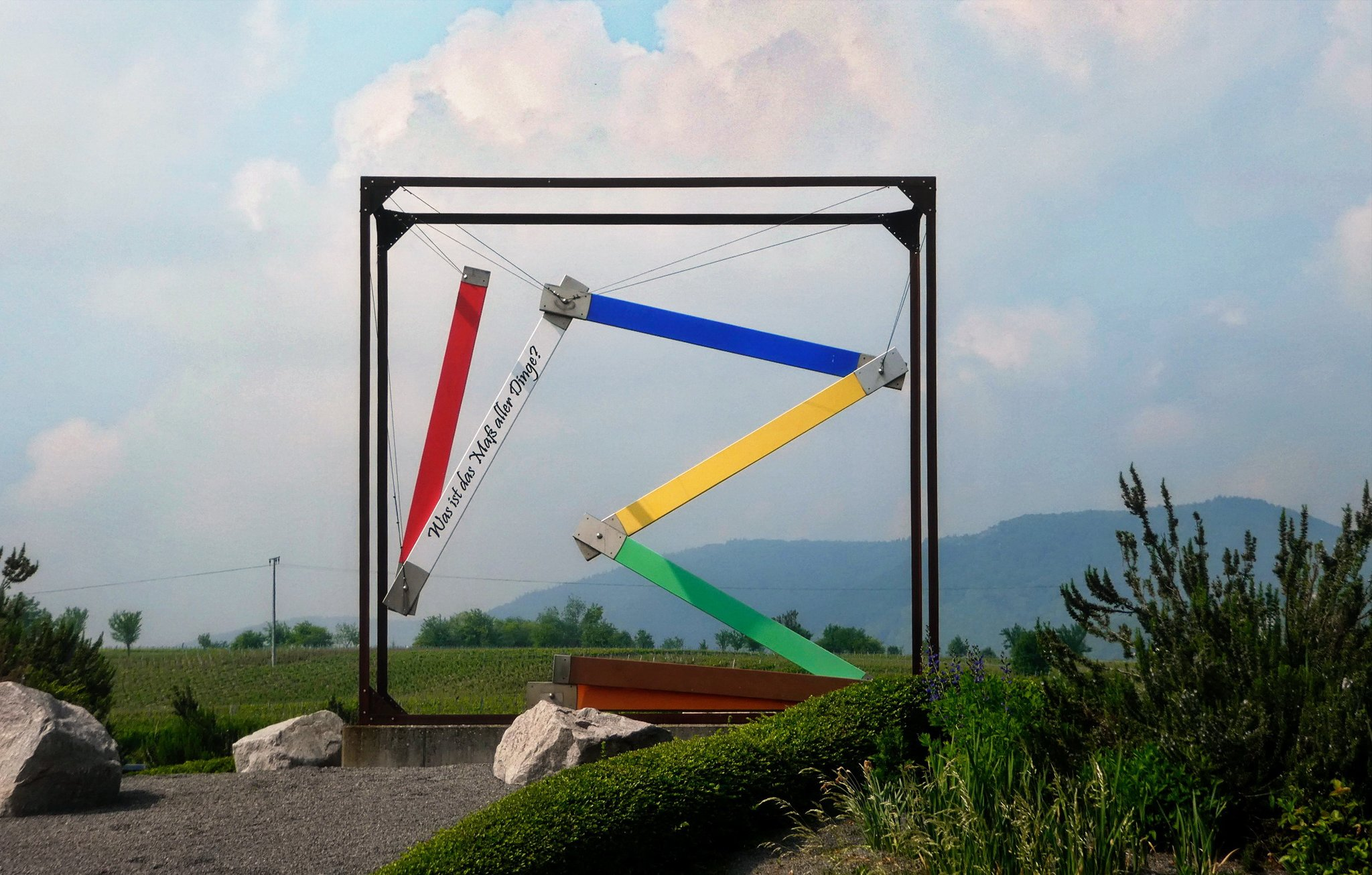
Folding Ruler Sculpture in Maikammer

In 2015, the Gebrüder-Ullrich-Realschule Plus Maikammer-Hambach was named after the Ullrich brothers.

In honor of the Ullrich brothers, a folding ruler sculpture was installed as a piece of art at one of the roundabouts in Maikammer.
