= Reginald Urch =

British writer (1884–1945)

Reginald Oliver Gilling Urch
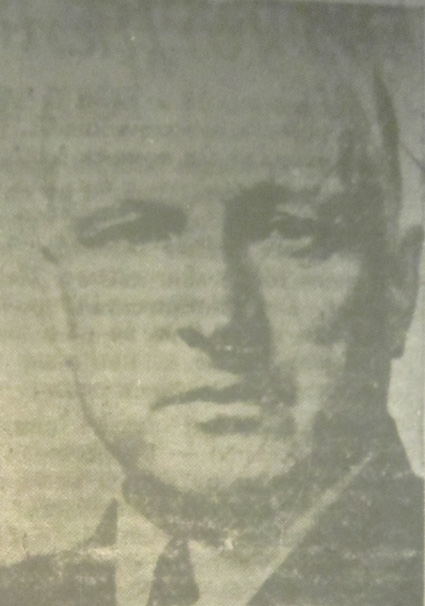
- Urch in an undated photograph
- Born: 13 May 1884; Mark, Somerset, England
- Died: 15 May 1945 (aged 61); Stockholm, Sweden
- Education: University of London
- Occupations: Journalist, author
- Spouse: Edith Urch
- Children: 2, including Edith Urch
- Writing career
- Language: English
- Genres: Russian affairs, political history, travel writing
- Notable works: We Generally Shoot Englishmen, Latvia, Country and People, The Rabbit King of Russia

Reginald Oliver Gilling Urch (13 May 1884 – 15 May 1945) was an author and journalist specialising in Russian affairs. He witnessed and described several major events in the first part of the 20th century.

== Biography ==
He was born at Mark, near Highbridge, Somerset. Graduating in Slavonic studies from London University, he expanded his education in Germany and Russia. He took up teaching in the Continent and established a language school in Riga.

Urch eventually lectured at Riga Polytechnic prior to the First World War. In 1915, fleeing the advancing German army, Urch and his family arrived at Moscow where he witnessed the Bolshevik Revolution. In 1936 he published a book: We Generally Shoot Englishmen, An English Schoolmaster's five years of mild adventure in Moscow, 1915–20, where he described what he saw and experienced there.

In this book Urch told the story of a rather ordinary English family not connected with any official missions, consulates, or services, in the years before, during and after the Russian revolution. The family, a husband, a wife, a son born in 1911, and a daughter born in 1914, fled Latvia before the arrival of the advancing German troops and eventually made it to Moscow, with little besides their hand-luggage and a trusty maid to help with the tiny children. There they made living by teaching English. While living in Moscow they witnessed the changes from Tsarist-autocratic to Bolshevist-autocratic rule.

In 1918 Urch was arrested by the Cheka, the Soviet state security organisation. No explanation of his arrest and imprisonment had been given. After two months in prison he was released but not allowed to leave Russia. Only later it became clear to him why he was arrested. He had found out it was due to a denunciation. A fellow member of the House Committee accused him of swindling the House Committee, pocketing the money subscribed for the purchase of products, and stealing the Committee's milk. The accuser died a few months later in a lunatic asylum.

In 1919 Edith, his wife, and children were allowed to leave Russia. In 1920 the man himself was sent by train across the border to Finland, together with other English citizens. They were exchanged for Bolshevists held by Britain; for each English citizen Britain released 42½ Bolshevists.

Owing to poor economic circumstances in England after the war, Urch returned to Riga, where he took up employment in 1920 as editor of the Latvian government's English-language commerce publication, The Latvian Economist. Shortly thereafter, in 1922, Urch also took up duties as the Russian affairs correspondence for The Times; he left his Latvian employ in 1926 to become their full-time correspondent.

In his article "Bolshevism and religion in Russia" (1923) Urch told the story of the struggle between the Bolshevik regime and the Russian Orthodox Church. Russia's great millions were suffering immensely and being slaughtered in their thousands, yet they were still clinging to their religion. The Bolsheviki moved cautiously against the church. They began by placarding public places with the legend: 'Religion is a narcotic for the people,' and removing ikons from public places. Later, these ikons were, in some cases, allowed to be put back; Urch remembered seeing some of them in their usual places as late as 1920. The Bolsheviki seemed to recognise that the temper of the people was not yet sufficiently under control for drastic measures against the Church.

Gradually it all changed. Private property was abolished and people were divided into categories for the distribution of food by the state, some categories receiving more, other less. Priests were not included in any categories: they had no food-cards, and “by living they were actually committing a crime, for they were forbidden to buy food or anything – they were left to starve.” The next step was the dismissals of bishops and priests, followed by trials by the Soviet tribunal for counter-revolution, that resulted in them being shot, or being banished to remote parts of Russia, or being sentenced to long terms of imprisonment with hard labour. With the rising generations the Bolsheviki hoped for better results, and that “the total disappearance of religion from Russia is only a matter of time.”

In 1927 he and Edith published a book English, a manual for studying English. Another book Latvia, Country and people, was first published in 1935 in Riga and later in 1938 in London. In this book Urch told the story of Latvia, its history, struggle for independence, economy, education, art, music, and so on. The book is not a travel guide in the Baedeker sense, that is, a book of comprehensive information about places designed for the use of visitors or tourists, but rather a presentation of sites of interest to the occasional visitor through their historical context. However, it includes also practical tips.

In 1939 he published The Rabbit King of Russia. In this book Urch told the stories of several mind-boggling absurd Soviet projects. The narrative is accompanied with footnotes and the reader must believe it all was true. One such project, that seems to have been quite successful, involved arresting foreign nationals and freeing them for ransom paid by relatives living abroad. This scheme was run by the Cheká and the foreign currency gained helped maintaining the regime. Other projects involved attempts to supersede the cow by producing milk supplies from soya bean, the creation of a dog-wool industry by shearing the dogs of Russia, the scheme to produce motor-oil from the bodies of Russia's untold millions of locusts to lubricate her thousands of agricultural tractors, the rounding up the bugs and beetles of Russia to found a State Beetle-soap industry, using tadpoles as excellent swine-fodder, and the "immense rabbit-farms designed to feed and rescue Russia's millions from enforced vegetarianism due to the depletion of ordinary flocks of herds." Urch wrote that "if a plan was large, new and startling, it was always practically sure of adoption though some were so inherently bizarre that even with the highest patronage they could not have a long innings". One major figure behind several of those projects was Gregóriy (Grisha) Antónovich Philíppoff, aka 'the Rabbit King of Russia'. By exposing these projects, which persistently remained concealed, Urch aimed at warning the Western countries from making fair deals with Soviet Russia.

Urch transferred to Warsaw in 1938, where he lived through the German invasion in 1939 and then escaped to Stockholm. When the Winter War between Russia and Finland broke, he was sent as a special correspondent to Finland. He spent time with the troops, getting a firsthand experience of the fighting, which was reflected in his reporting.

In June 1941, came German attack on Russia. His dispatches were read with interest not only by the general reader but also by professional soldiers.

Urch died suddenly on 15 May 1945, in Stockholm. In an obituary published by The Times on 12 June 1945, pg. 7, Mr. Peter Tennant wrote:

It was with a feeling of profound distress that I read of the death of your Special Correspondent in Stockholm, R. O. G. Urch. I knew him well during my years in Stockholm as Press Attaché and greatly valued his friendship, wisdom, and whimsical sense of humour. In spite of having spent the greater part of his life in Russia and the Baltic States and Eastern Europe, he remained solidly British to the core, and in the dark days of 1940 and 1941, when our country stood alone and later when Russia was invaded and retreating before German onslaught, Oliver Urch remained calm and unperturbed, always ready to persuade those who doubted in the allies of the certainty of allied victory. In an atmosphere in which it was difficult even for the best of journalists to distinguish truth from fiction he maintained the highest standards of journalism. He was universally beloved and respected by his colleagues of the allied Press in Stockholm, and his kindness, modesty, and wise judgment will be remembered gratefully by his numerous Scandinavian friends.

The Swedish newspaper Dagens Nyheter published an obituary already the day after his death (in Swedish, here translated into English):

The doyen of foreign journalists brought to Stockholm by the war, Mr. R.O.G. Urch, correspondent for The Times, passed away last Tuesday afternoon at Serafimerlasarettet (Serafimer Hospital), where he had been brought earlier that day due to a severe heart attack. The direct cause of death was a blood clot in the heart. He was 61 years old last Sunday.

The small colony of foreign journalists in Stockholm loses with Reginald Oliver Gillings Urch an extraordinary competent and conscientious member, and together with them many of their Swedish colleagues feel regret for a good and faithful professional friend. His confident and bright temper, his willingness to listen and help, and his rich fund of knowledge, impossible to hide by his distinctive personal modesty, provided him both affection and respect in all circles. Urch had spent the last five years studying and describing the German warfare and politics from the Stockholm horizon. Especially during the first years of the German-Russian war, his clear and modest daily analyses of the situation at the war front attracted much attention, since it was quite difficult for the English press to get a reliable picture from their reporters in Moscow of what was going on. Insofar as he treated Swedish affairs, which he seldom did, he always made an effort to correctly and often benevolently report the Swedish views.

As a journalist, Urch had an unusual career. Already in 1907, as a young man, he came to Riga, where he worked as a teacher of English until the outbreak of the World War. He focused from the beginning on thoroughly learning Russian, and he published several frequently used textbooks in English. He spent the war years in Moscow, where he for some time held a teaching position at the university. During the revolutionary years, he was imprisoned for a short time by the Bolsheviks. This experience marks the culmination in a book about his adventures in Russia during the war, much later published under the title We generally shoot Englishmen. After his release and some time in England in the twenties, he returned to Riga, but did not remain as a language teacher for long. From 1922 and up to 1938 he worked as a correspondent for The Times in Riga with the aim to cover the large Russian field. He did this work together with his wife with great energy and almost scientific thoroughness – his reports were often echoed in the world press and in the British House of Commons. He was moved to Warsaw the year before the outbreak of the war, still mainly as a reporter on Russia. He was in Finland during the Winter War, and came from there to Stockholm in May 1940.

The late journalist is primarily mourned by his spouse in Stockholm and a son and a daughter in England.

== Personal life ==
Urch married in 1909 and had a son and daughter. His daughter Edith Urch founded the Ladyeholme Housing Association, a charity for homeless people in London.

== Publications ==
- Urch, R. O. G. 1923. Bolshevism and religion in Russia. The Atlantic Monthly. Volume 131, March 1923: 394–406.
- Urch Reginald O. G & Urch Edith G. 1927. Podręcznik języka angielskiego. Cz. 1. Warszawa: [s.n.]
- Urch Reginald O. G & Urch Edith G. 1929. English ... Riga: Walters and Rapa.
- Urch Reginald O. G et Urch Edith G. 1930. English, manuel de langue anglaise. Paris: Presses universitaires de France.
- Urch, R. O. G. 1935. Latvia, country and people. Riga: Walter and Papa, Ltd.
- Urch, R. O. G. 1936. “We Generally Shoot Englishmen,” an English schoolmaster’s five years of mild adventure in Moscow (1915–20). London: George Allen & Unwin Ltd.
- Urch, R. O. G. 1938. Latvia, country and people. London: George Allen & Unwin Ltd.
- Urch, R. O. G. 1939. The Rabbit King Of Russia. London: Eyre and Spottiswoode.
