= Edith Urch =

British humanitarian (c. 1915–1978)

- Born: Edith Laura Urch; Russia
- Occupations: Nurse; charity worker

Edith Laura Urch (c. 1915 – January 1978), known to her friends as Urchie, was an English nurse and charity worker who founded the Ladyeholme Housing Association, a charity for homeless people, and ran it as general secretary until her death.

Urch was born in Russia, although her parents were both from Somerset. Her father, Reginald Urch, was Professor of English at the University of Moscow. Shortly after the Russian Revolution in 1917, her father was arrested and incarcerated in the Lubyanka Prison, and she and her mother hid in a tiny peasant cottage just outside the city. Eventually, in 1920, her father was released, and the family returned to England. She remembered her experiences of poverty in Russia all her life, and these contributed to her founding of Ladyeholme. Her father later returned to the area as Russian and Baltic correspondent of The Times, based in Riga, Latvia.

Urch was educated in England and France and then joined the Poor Clares as a postulant. However, she decided that her vocation was in nursing and left the order (although she remained a deeply devout Roman Catholic all her life), qualifying as a State Registered Nurse and later also as a State Certified Midwife. She eventually rose to become a sister-tutor at the Charing Cross Hospital in London.

During the Second World War, she suffered severe spinal injuries during an air raid, which left her partially disabled and often in great pain for the rest of her life. In 1951, using her disability pension, she bought a small terraced house in Battersea and began to take in homeless people. This developed into Ladyeholme (the name coming from an historical association devoted to the Virgin Mary), which eventually had use of 42 houses throughout London. These houses had generally been purchased by public authorities, such as the Department of Transport or the GLC, for road schemes or other public works and Ladyeholme was able to use them to house the homeless pending final definition. The charity was always short of money, and Urch often lived in poverty herself at her home/office in Warwick Way, London, SW1, giving everything she had to it. She was often in conflict with Shelter, a much larger charity for the homeless, whom she accused of including the families housed by Ladyeholme in its statistics and claiming that it was the only charity helping the homeless in London, ignoring the existence of Ladyeholme. The charity relied extensively on voluntary work, often coming from Church connections. In the end, Ladyeholme failed to endure because her tremendous drive was not matched by high-quality governance.
