= Fissler =

German houseware manufacturer

Fissler GmbH

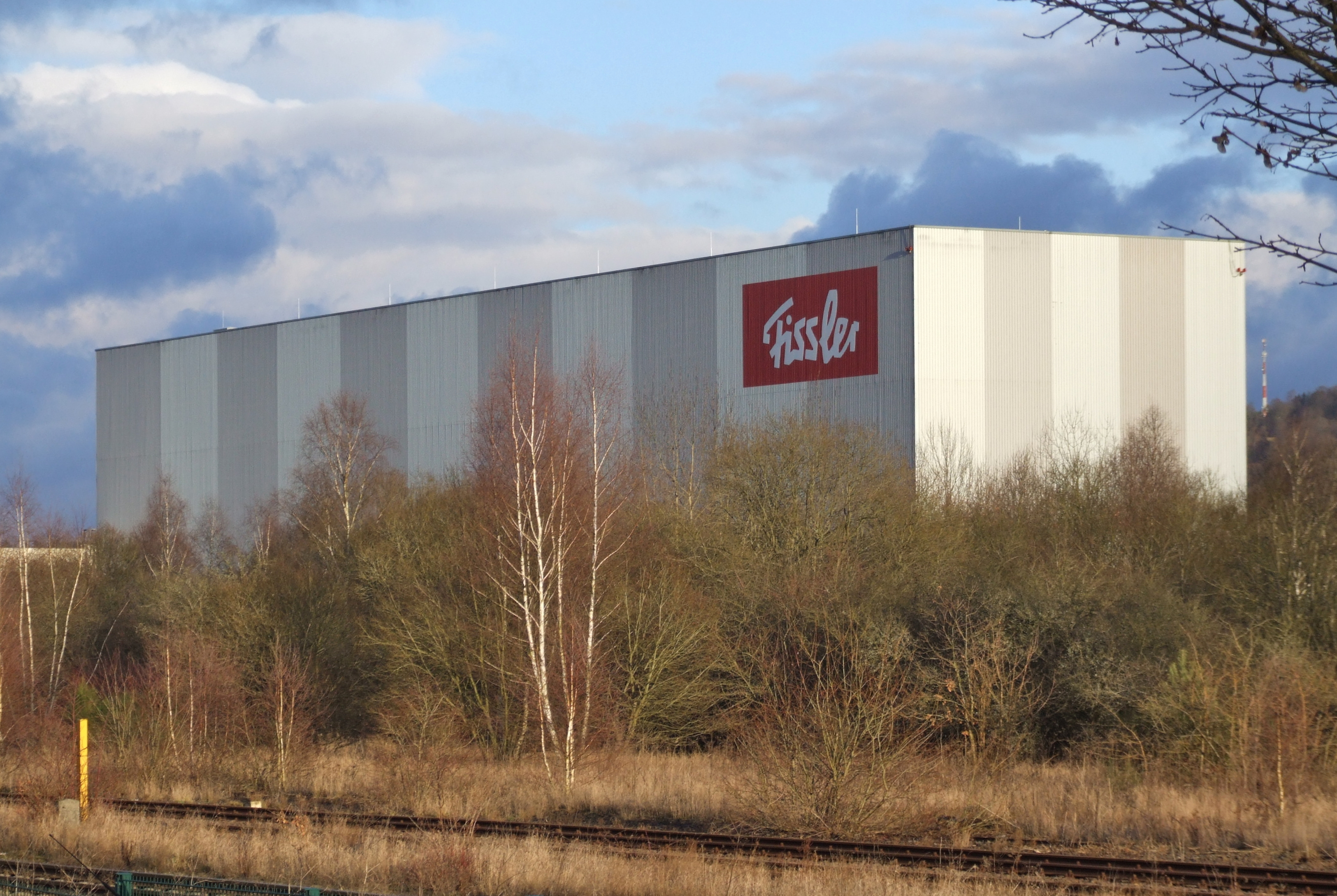
- Warehouse in Hoppstädten-Weiersbach
- Company type: GmbH (limited liability company)
- Industry: Cookware manufacturer
- Founded: 1845
- Founder: Carl Fissler
- Headquarters: Idar-Oberstein, Rhineland-Palatinate, Germany
- Products: Small appliances, pots, pans, woks, knives and kitchen utensils
- Number of employees: 765 worldwide as of February 2013
- Website: www.fissler.com (in English)
- Footnotes / references Corresponding article on the German Wikipedia

Fissler is a company based in Germany that produces cookware items. Fissler's main products include pots, pans, and pressure cookers, knives; and kitchen accessories.

Fissler's history dates back to the 19th century with its introduction of the Goulash Cannon, a mobile field kitchen. In the 1920s Fissler came out with the first aluminum pans for electric stoves. In the 1950s Fissler introduced the first pressure cooker with a multi-setting control valve and the patented "Thematic" base.

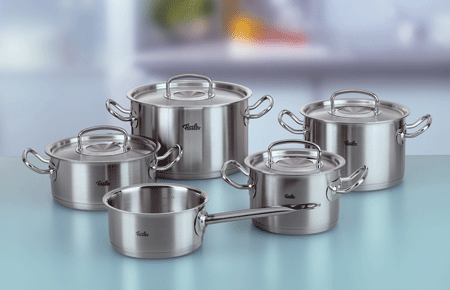
The Fissler Original-Profi Collection pots and pans.

Today, Fissler's pots and pans have an all-stove base, meaning that they can be used on any heating surface without warping or degrading. Fissler also produces the CookStar Induction Pro, an induction cooking surface. Induction cooking uses electromagnetic technology to heat the pots and pans, without being hot to the touch.

The company at one time produced the world's most expensive pan costing £100,000.

Fissler's two lines of knives are called Profession and Perfection. The Profession line is inspired by Japanese knives and includes knives specifically for making sushi.
