= Maikammer =

- Municipality
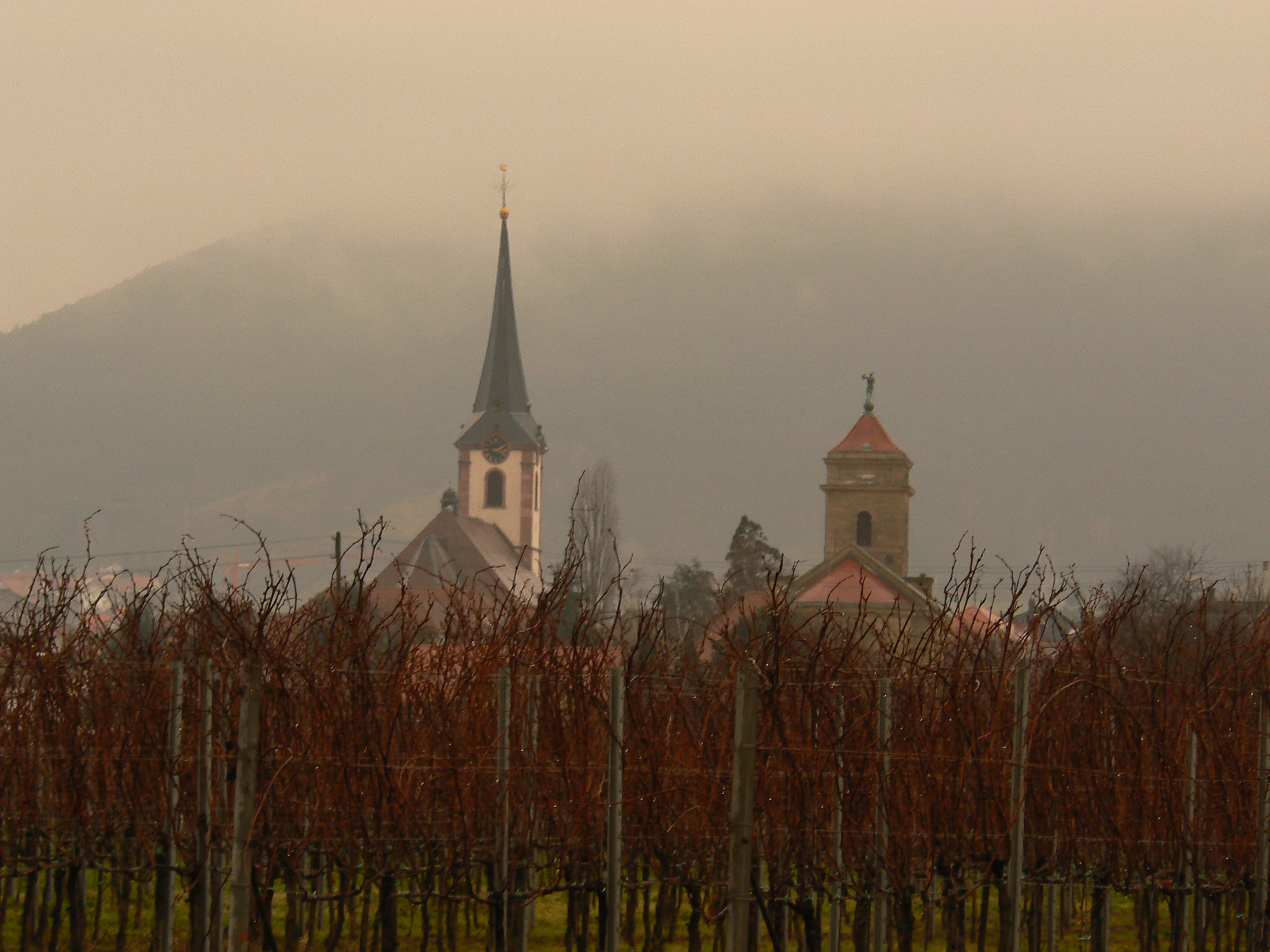

- Coat of arms

- Location of Maikammer within Südliche Weinstraße district
- Interactive map of Maikammer
- Location within Germany Location within Rhineland-Palatinate
- Coordinates: 49°18′N 8°8′E
- Country: Germany
- State: Rhineland-Palatinate
- District: Südliche Weinstraße
- Municipal assoc.: Maikammer

Government
  - Mayor (2019–24): Karl Schäfer (CDU)

Area
  - Total: 13.68 km^{2} (5.28 sq mi)
- Elevation: 151 m (495 ft)

Population (2025-12-31)
  - Total: 4,382
  - Density: 320.3/km^{2} (829.6/sq mi)
- Time zone: UTC+01:00 (CET)
  - Summer (DST): UTC+02:00 (CEST)
- Postal codes: 67487
- Dialling codes: 06321
- Vehicle registration: SÜW
- Website: www.maikammer.de

Maikammer (Palatine German: Maikomma) is a municipality in the Südliche Weinstraße district, in Rhineland-Palatinate, Germany. It is situated on the German Wine Route, approx. 5 km south of Neustadt an der Weinstraße. Maikammer is the seat of the Verbandsgemeinde Maikammer.

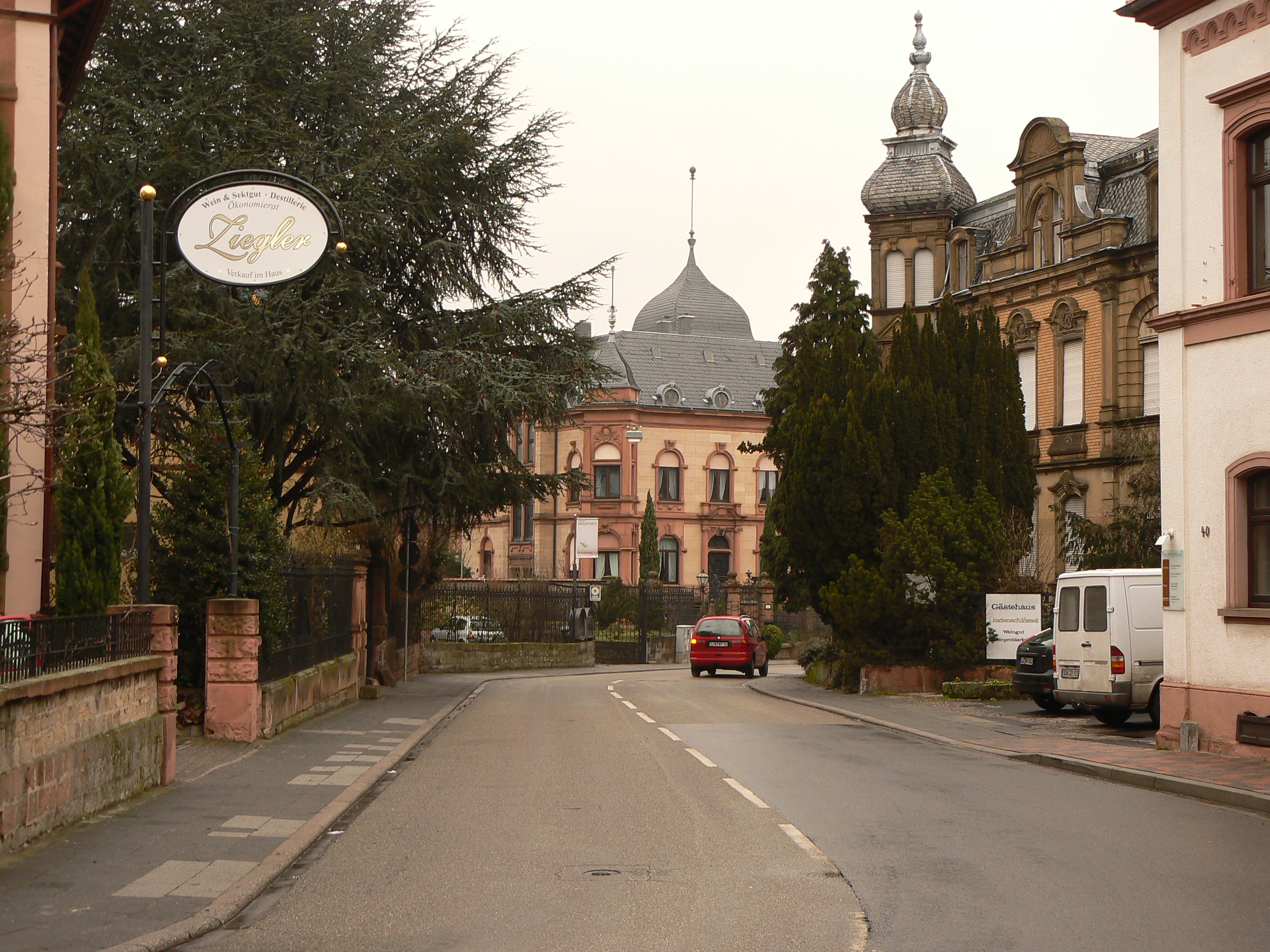
Maikammer

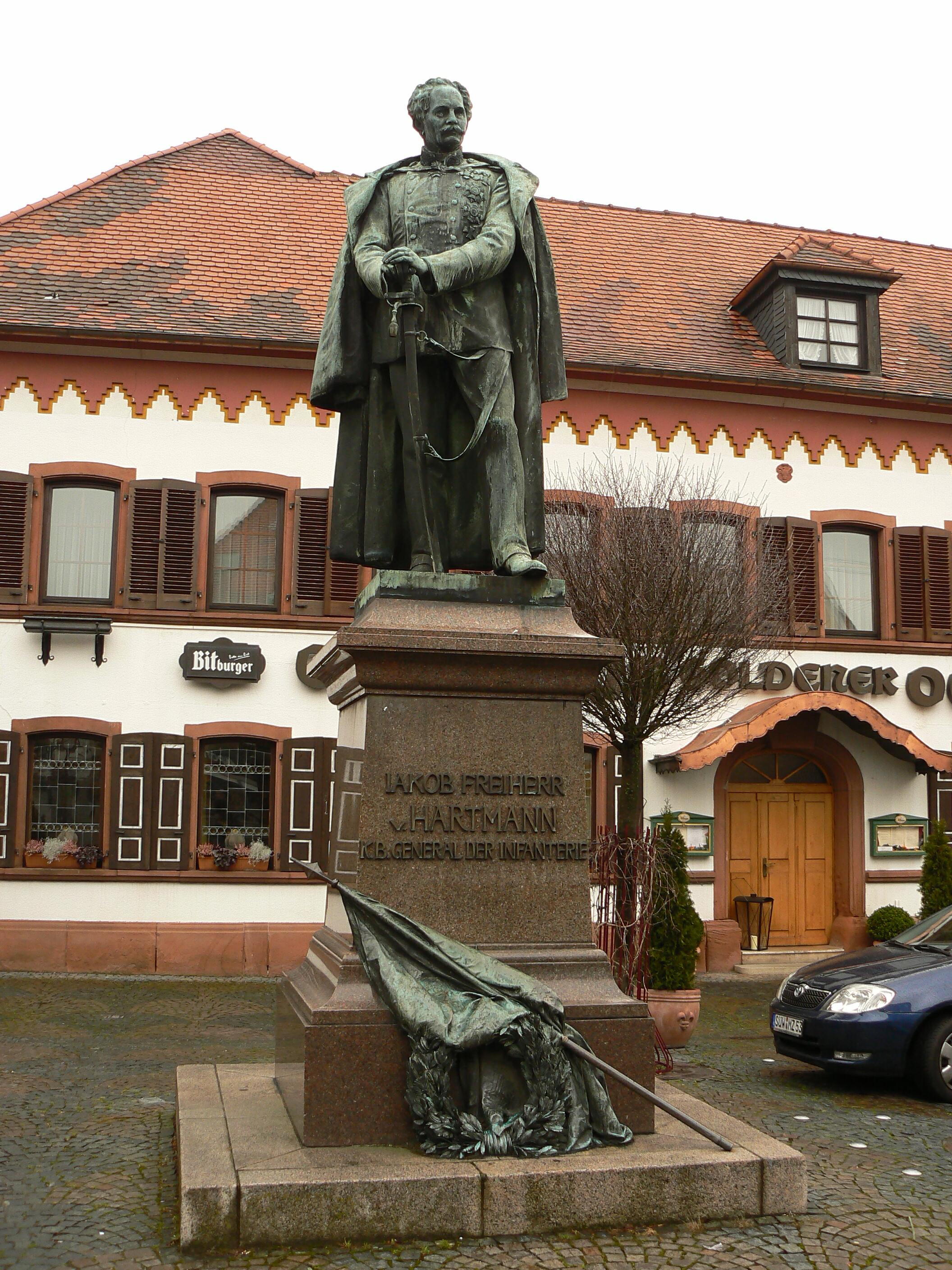
General Jakob von Hartman

== Geography ==
=== Location ===
Maikammer lies at elevations from 120 to 300 m at the foot of the Kalmit, the highest mountain in the Palatine Forest (673 m), in a landscape dominated by vineyards. Other high ground within the boundaries of the parish includes the north flank of the Schafkopf (617 m), the Rotsohlberg (607 m), the north flank of the Stotz (603 m), the northeast flank of the Breitenberg (545 m), the Flachkopf (498 m) and the Wetterkreuzberg (401 m).

Neighbouring municipalities are (clockwise): Neustadt an der Weinstraße, Kirrweiler (Pfalz), Edenkoben, Sankt Martin (Pfalz), Edenkoben (exclave), Gommersheim (exclave) and Kirrweiler (exclave).

=== Climate ===
Due to its mild climate, not only do grapes grow here but also exotic fruit such as kiwis, lemons, almonds and sweet chestnuts.

== Industry ==
Maikammer's local economy is predominantly supported by the wine industry. The area is well known for the vineyards of Alsterweiler, Kappellenberg, Kirchenstück, Immengarten and Heiligenberg, which produce Müller-Thurgau and Riesling grapes. Wine has played a significant part in Maikammer's history, both economically and culturally. Maikammer is also host to numerous villas built by the original wine families of the area, which now help to attract tourists to the area.

During the 1850s, Anton Ullrich and his brother Franz Ullrich established an enameling factory in Maikammer producing enameled kitchenware. This factory was a major source of employment for the people of Maikammer, employing around 1,000 people at its peak. The products made in Maikammer were sold throughout Europe, distribution extended as far east as Russia. The factory was closed in 1928 as a result of Germany's hyperinflation.

== Spelling variations ==
The town of Maikammer has also been spelled in the following ways: Meinkeimere (1315), Meinkemer (1329), Menkemer (1335), Menkemere (1345), Meinkemeren (1346), Meinkemer (1348), Meinkeymer (1350, 1366), Meinkeimer (1370), Meinkemer (1391, 1419), Meynkeimere (1437), Meynkamere (1464), Meinkheimer (1468), Meyekeymere (1500), Mainkeimer (1542), Meynkammer (1560), Maycammer (1650), and since 1800 Maikammer.

== Mayors ==
- Sebastian Frantz (1860–1904)
- Eduard Wolf (1904–1920)
- Dr. J.C. Wolf (1920–1933)
- Gustav Buchenberger (1933–1942)
- Otto Wingerter (1942–1945)
- Dr. J.C. Wolf (1945–1946)
- Alfred Wagner (1946–1947)
- Rudolf Straub (1947–1948)
- Hermann Ullrich (1948–1955, CDU)
- Johannes Damm (1955–1973, CDU)
- Rudolf Müller (1973–1974, CDU)
- Dieter Ziegler (1974–1994, CDU)
- Karl Schäfer (1994–incumbent, CDU)

== Notable residents ==
- General Jakob Freiherr von Hartmann (1797–1873)
- Franz Ullrich (1830–1891), industrialist
