= Anton Ullrich =

Johannes Anton Ullrich (1826–1895) was a German industrialist, inventor, and co-founder of the Gebrüder Ullrich factories in the Rhineland-Palatinate. Together with his brother Franz Ullrich, Anton Ullrich developed the spring-loaded joint lock for folding rulers, which made it possible to measure horizontally and vertically with folding yardsticks without them collapsing. In 1886, the invention was successfully registered for a patent under the title “Innovation in folding rulers with spring locking.” At the Paris World’s Fair in 1889, the invention achieved enormous success.

== Life and work ==
=== Beginnings and Patent ===
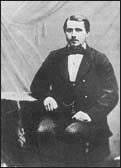
Anton Ullrich

Anton Ullrich was born on the 01 August 1826 in the small village of Maikammer, Germany. In 1851, Ullrich took over from his late father Leonhard (1793–1838) a general store dealing in colonial and textile goods in Maikammer. The Ullrich brothers had married two sisters, and Anton established the business in his in-laws’ house at Hartmannstraße 5, which provided the necessary space.

The first business years, however, were marked by an economic crisis, and Anton Ullrich sought a second source of income. A carpenter, whom he had watched making a “yardstick,” gave him the idea of producing folding rulers. Thus the first ruler factory on German soil was founded. In 1855 Anton purchased a machine for grading measuring rods from the Paris World’s Fair.

Three years later, in 1858, he offered his younger brother Franz, four years his junior, a partnership, whereupon Franz joined the business. The range of products was gradually expanded. Among other things, cow and horse currycombs as well as tinware were manufactured (1868), and a tinning facility was put into operation (1869).

On September 10, 1886, the Ullrich brothers registered a patent for the spring lock on folding rulers, which made it possible to measure horizontally and vertically with folding yardsticks without them collapsing. Together, they are therefore regarded as the inventors of the folding ruler in the form commonly used today. At the Paris World’s Fair in 1889, the invention achieved enormous success.

=== Enamel Factory “Gebrüder Ullrich” ===
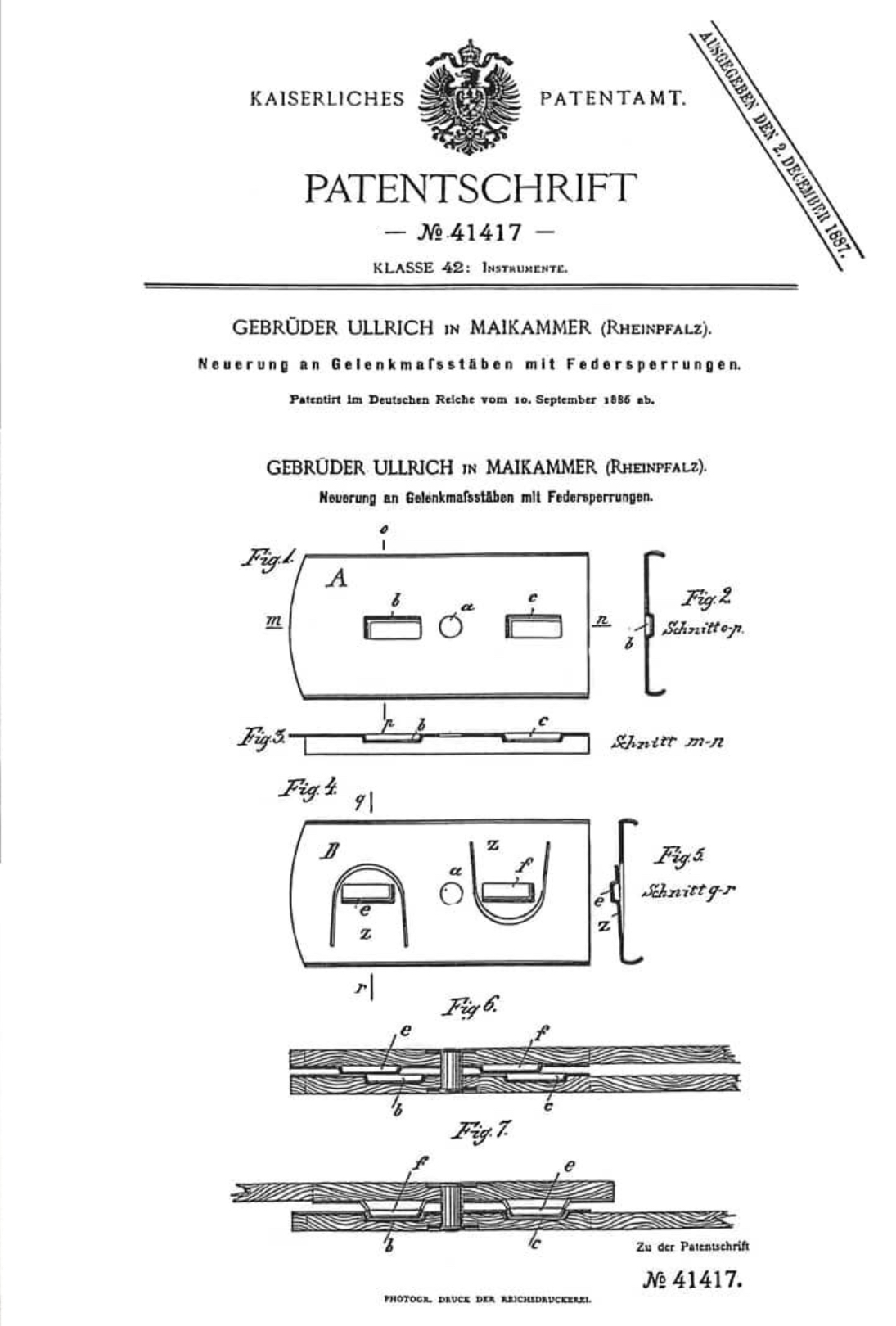
Excerpt from the Patent of the Gebrüder Ullrich, 1886

In 1877, in addition to the general store, an enameling plant was founded; in 1884, the factory was expanded and employed 250 workers.

In 1890, the company was transformed into a joint-stock company under the name Emaillier-und Stanzwerke vormals Gebrüder Ullrich as the Ullrich brothers parted ways that year. Franz Ullrich moved to Annweiler, where his son Gustav had already founded a ruler factory in 1889, which later developed into the company Stabila, which still exists today.

Anton Ullrich’s business was continuously expanded, so that in 1887 another enamel plant was established in Schifferstadt, among other places.

Due to the First World War, the company suffered severe economic losses, and ruler production was discontinued in 1918. After the death of Ullrich’s son August Ullrich in 1927, the company went bankrupt in 1928.

== Commemoration ==
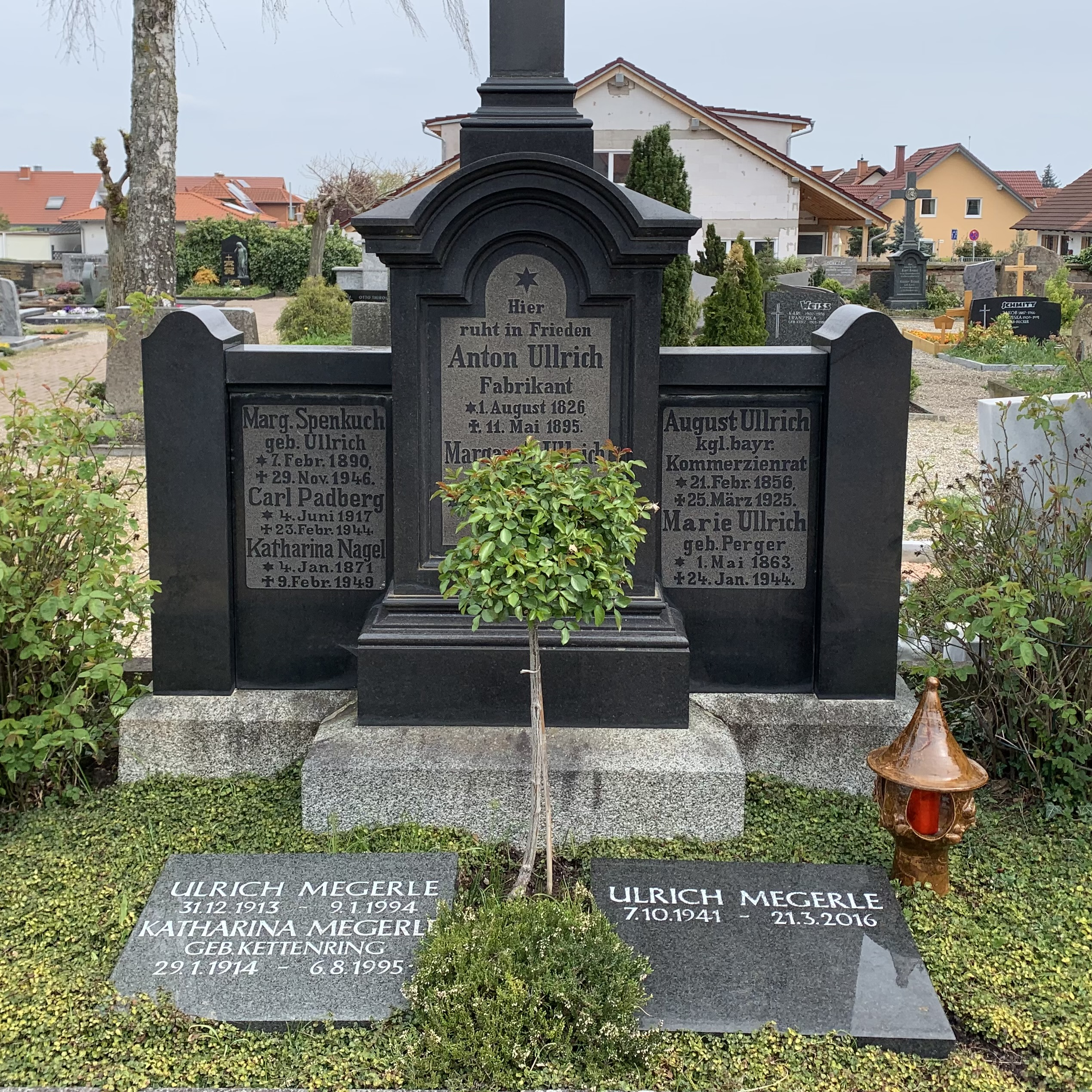
Ullrich family grave in Maikammer

In 2015, the Gebrüder-Ullrich-Realschule Plus Maikammer-Hambach, a Secondary School was named after the Ullrich brothers.

In remembrance of the Ullrich brothers, a folding ruler was erected as a work of art at one of the traffic roundabouts in Maikammer.
