= Ultsch =

Ultsch is a German language surname. It stems from a reduced form of the male given name Ulrich. Notable people with the surname include:

- Bernhard Ultsch (1898–unknown), German World War I flying ace
- Detlef Ultsch (1955), former East German judoka
