= Kirrweiler =

- Municipality
- Coat of arms

- Location of Kirrweiler within Südliche Weinstraße district
- Interactive map of Kirrweiler
- Location within Germany Location within Rhineland-Palatinate
- Coordinates: 49°18′14″N 8°09′50″E
- Country: Germany
- State: Rhineland-Palatinate
- District: Südliche Weinstraße
- Municipal assoc.: Maikammer

Government
  - Mayor (2019–24): Rolf Metzger

Area
  - Total: 14.85 km^{2} (5.73 sq mi)
- Elevation: 140 m (460 ft)

Population (2025-12-31)
  - Total: 2,132
  - Density: 143.6/km^{2} (371.8/sq mi)
- Time zone: UTC+01:00 (CET)
  - Summer (DST): UTC+02:00 (CEST)
- Postal codes: 67489
- Dialling codes: 06321
- Vehicle registration: SÜW
- Website: www.kirrweiler.de

Kirrweiler (German pronunciation: [ˈkɪʁvaɪlɐ]) is a municipality in the Südliche Weinstraße district, in Rhineland-Palatinate, Germany.
