= Annweiler am Trifels =

- Town
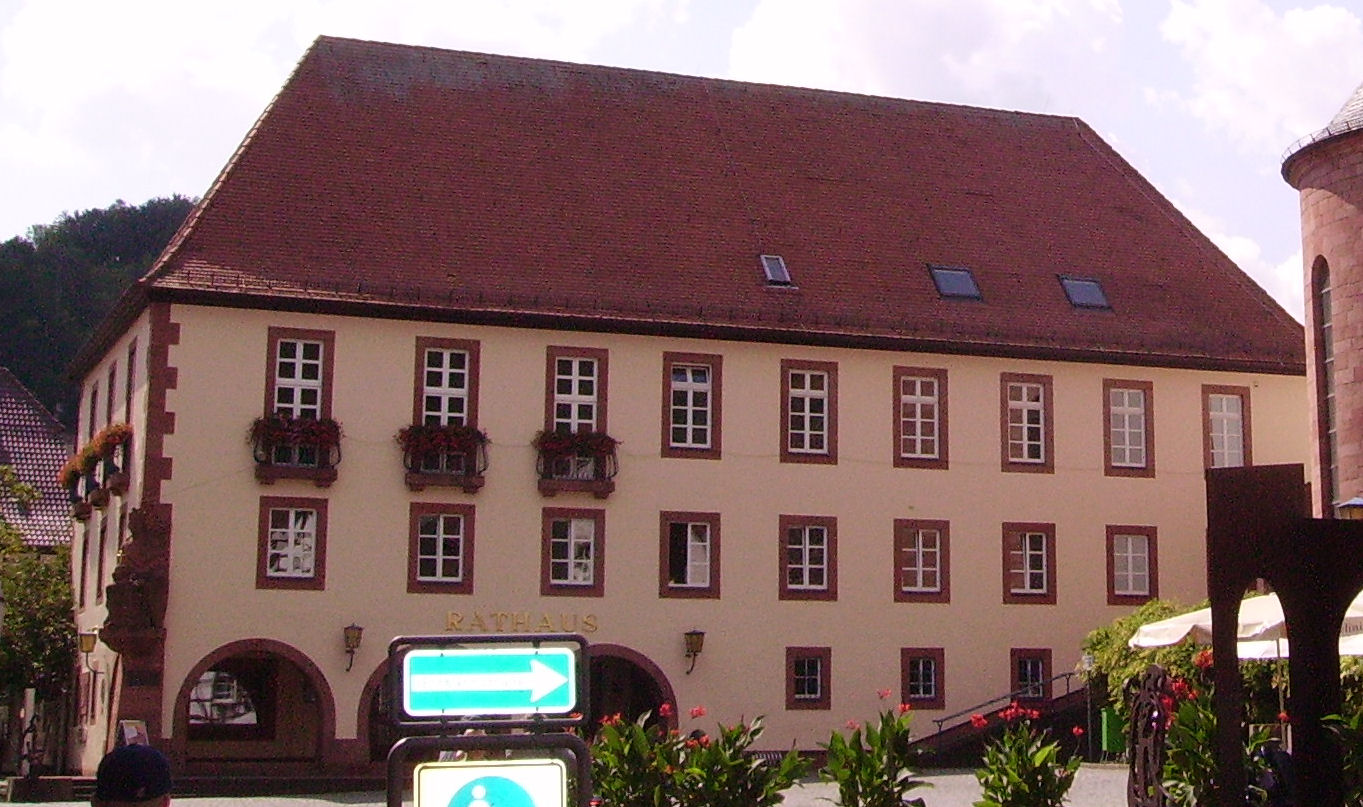
- Town hall

- Coat of arms

- Location of Annweiler am Trifels within Südliche Weinstraße district
- Interactive map of Annweiler am Trifels
- Location within Germany Location within Rhineland-Palatinate
- Coordinates: 49°12′N 7°58′E
- Country: Germany
- State: Rhineland-Palatinate
- District: Südliche Weinstraße
- Municipal assoc.: Annweiler am Trifels

Government
  - Mayor (2024–29): Carmen Winter

Area
  - Total: 39.87 km^{2} (15.39 sq mi)
- Elevation: 179 m (587 ft)

Population (2025-12-31)
  - Total: 7,233
  - Density: 181.4/km^{2} (469.9/sq mi)
- Time zone: UTC+01:00 (CET)
  - Summer (DST): UTC+02:00 (CEST)
- Postal codes: 76855
- Dialling codes: 06346
- Vehicle registration: SÜW
- Website: www.annweiler.de

Annweiler am Trifels (German: [ˈanvaɪlɐ ʔam ˈtʁiːfɛls]), or Annweiler is a town in the Südliche Weinstraße district, in Rhineland-Palatinate, Germany. It is situated on the river Queich, 12 km west of Landau. Annweiler am Trifels station is on the Landau–Saarbrücken railway.

Annweiler is situated in the Southern part of the Palatinate Forest called the Wasgau, and is surrounded by high hills which yield a famous red sandstone. The town's main industry is tourism. On the Sonnenberg (493 m) lie the ruins of the castle of Trifels, in which Richard Coeur de Lion was imprisoned from 31 March to 19 April 1193.

Annweiler is the seat of the Verbandsgemeinde ("collective municipality") of Annweiler am Trifels.

In a 1911 edition of the Brockhaus Enzyklopädie, the area around Annweiler was referred to as "Pfälzer Schweiz".

Annweiler has a primary school and a secondary school ( Staatliche Realschule Annweiler ) which was a partner school with the William Lovell Secondary School in Stickney, Lincolnshire. There is also a school for people with learning disabilities and a vocational school and the Trifels-Gymnasium evangelical grammar school.

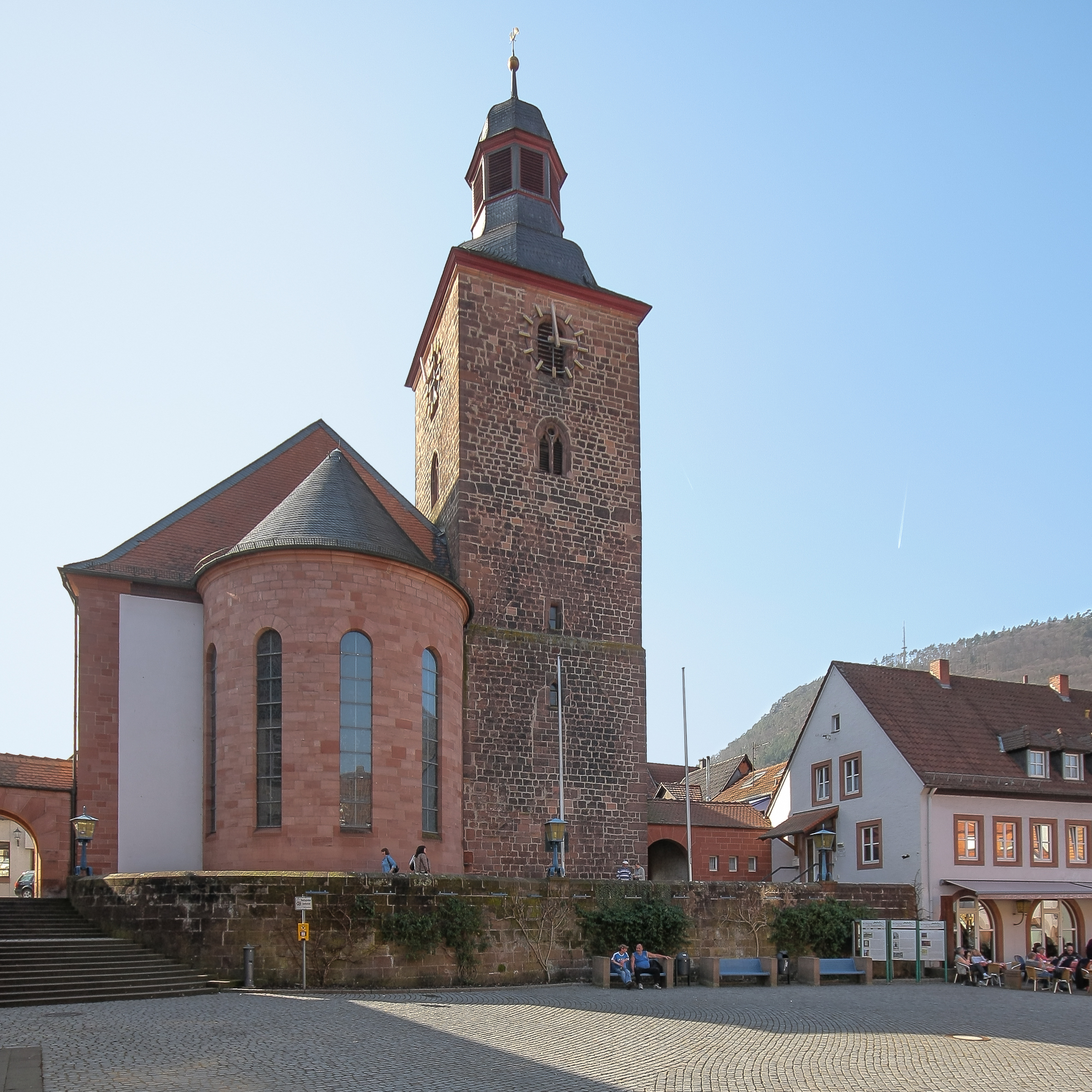
Protestant church at the Marktplatz

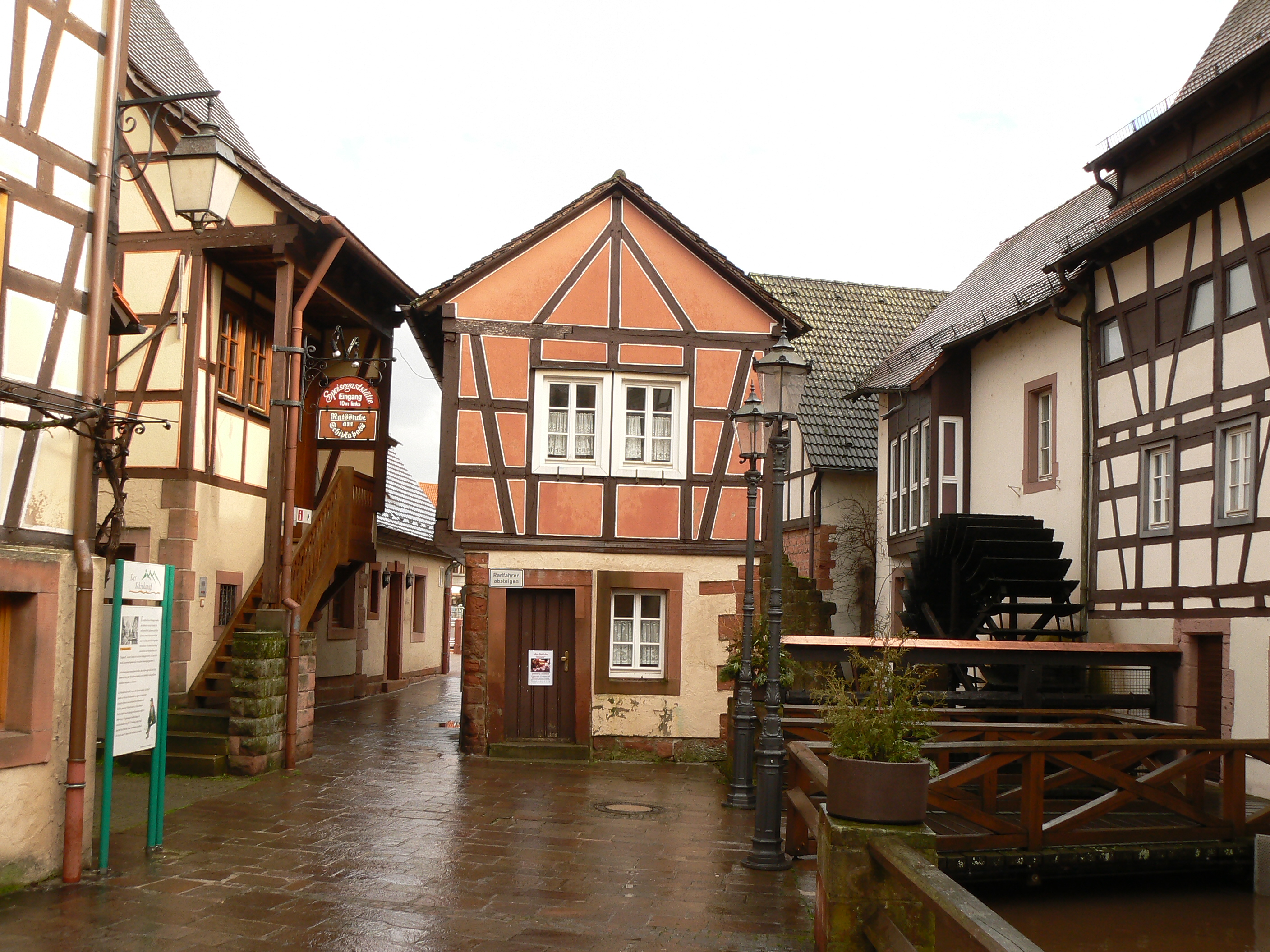
Annweiler am Trifels

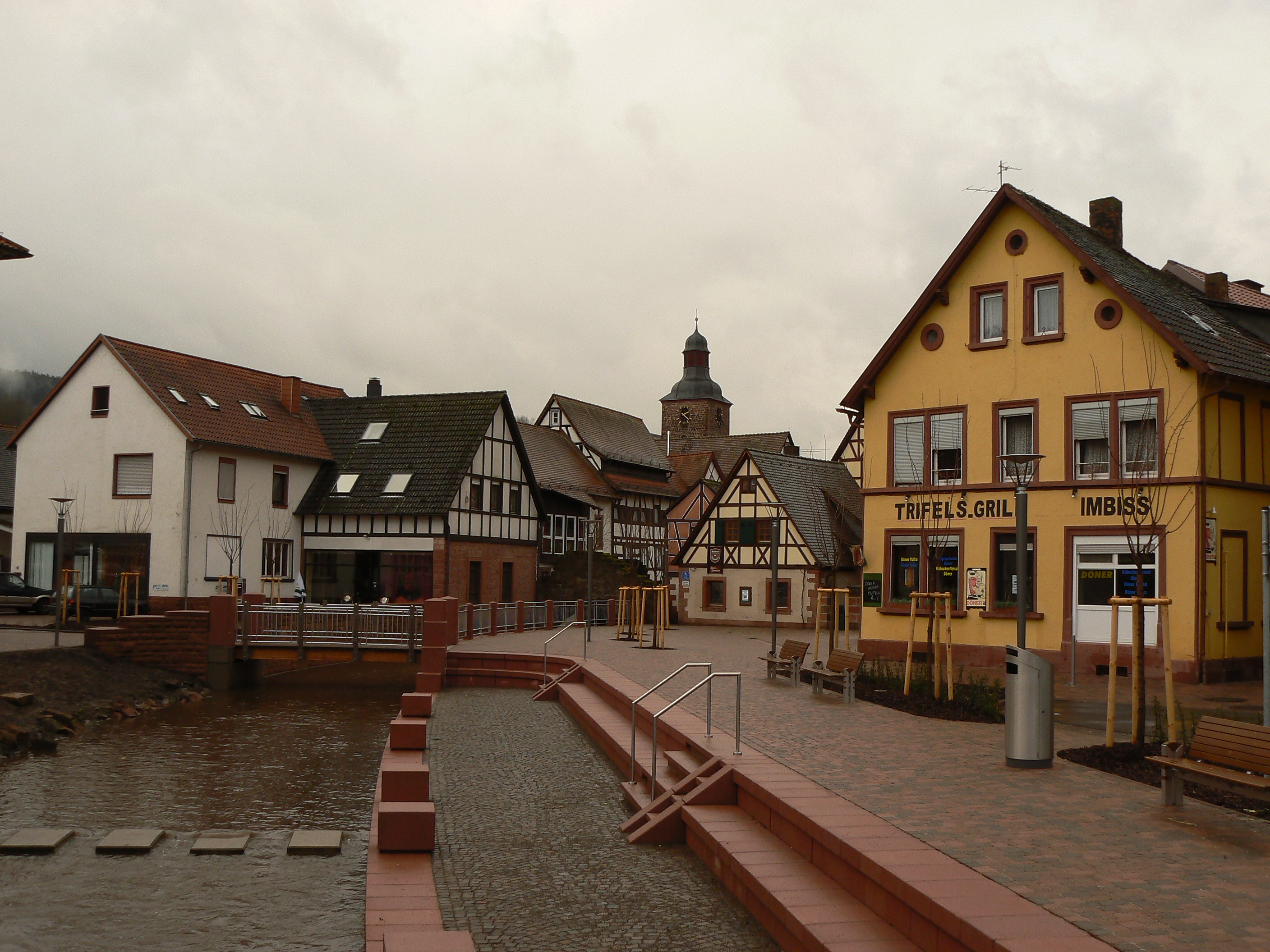
Annweiler am Trifels

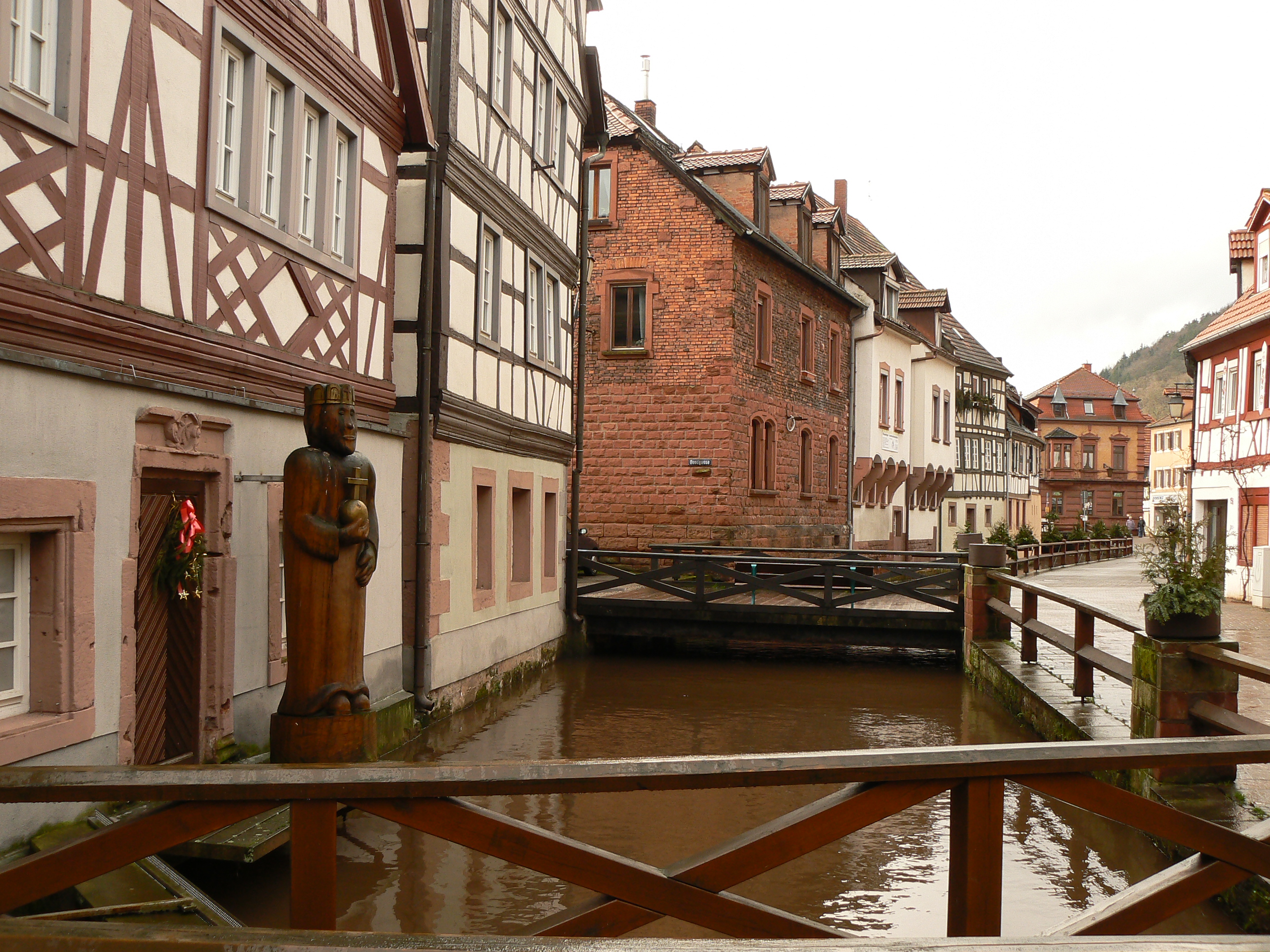
Annweiler am Trifels

== Mayors ==
- Christian Sieben (1815–1832)
- Heinrich Pasquay (1832–1833)
- Abraham Noe (1833–1835)
- Heinrich Mühlhäuser (1837–1848)
- Wilhelm Köstner (1848–1851)
- Matthäus Künkele (1852)
- Georg Jacoby (1853–1858)
- Philipp Streccius (1871–1874)
- Karl Culmann (1875–1877)
- Georg Jacoby (1877–1885)
- August Pasquay (1885–1899)
- Philipp Daniel Bartz (1900–1913)
- Jean Meyer (1913–1918)
- Philipp Mergenthaler (1918–1919)
- Adolf Hoffmann (1920–1921)
- Heinrich Gotthold (1921)
- Konrad Bretz (1921–1928)
- Friedrich Orth (1928–1933)
- Karl Becker (1933)
- Richard Bärsch (1933–1935)
- Friedrich Peters (1935–1940)
- Richard Bärsch (1940–1945)
- Eduard Diehlmann (1945–1946)
- Friedrich Hofäcker (1946–1956)
- Theo Leyendecker (1956–1969)
- Hans Stöcklein (1969–1987)
- Peter Weber (1987–1994)
- Gert Rillmann (1994–2004)
- Thomas Wollenweber (2004–2019)
- Benjamin Seyfried (2019–2024)
- Carmen Winter (2024– – )

== Notable residents ==
- Markward von Annweiler (1140–1202)
- Horst Christill (born 1959) church musician and composer
- Matthias Kern (1750–1793) Journalist
- August Naegle (1869–1932) Church Historian, Politician
- Hans-Ulrich Pfaffmann, Politician
- Jutta Kleinschmidt, Auto Racing Driver
- Gustav Ullrich, Industrialist
- Friedrich Gerhard Wahl (1748–1826) Engineer and Architect

== International relations ==
Annweiler am Trifels is twinned with:

- Ambert, France
- Gorgonzola, Italy

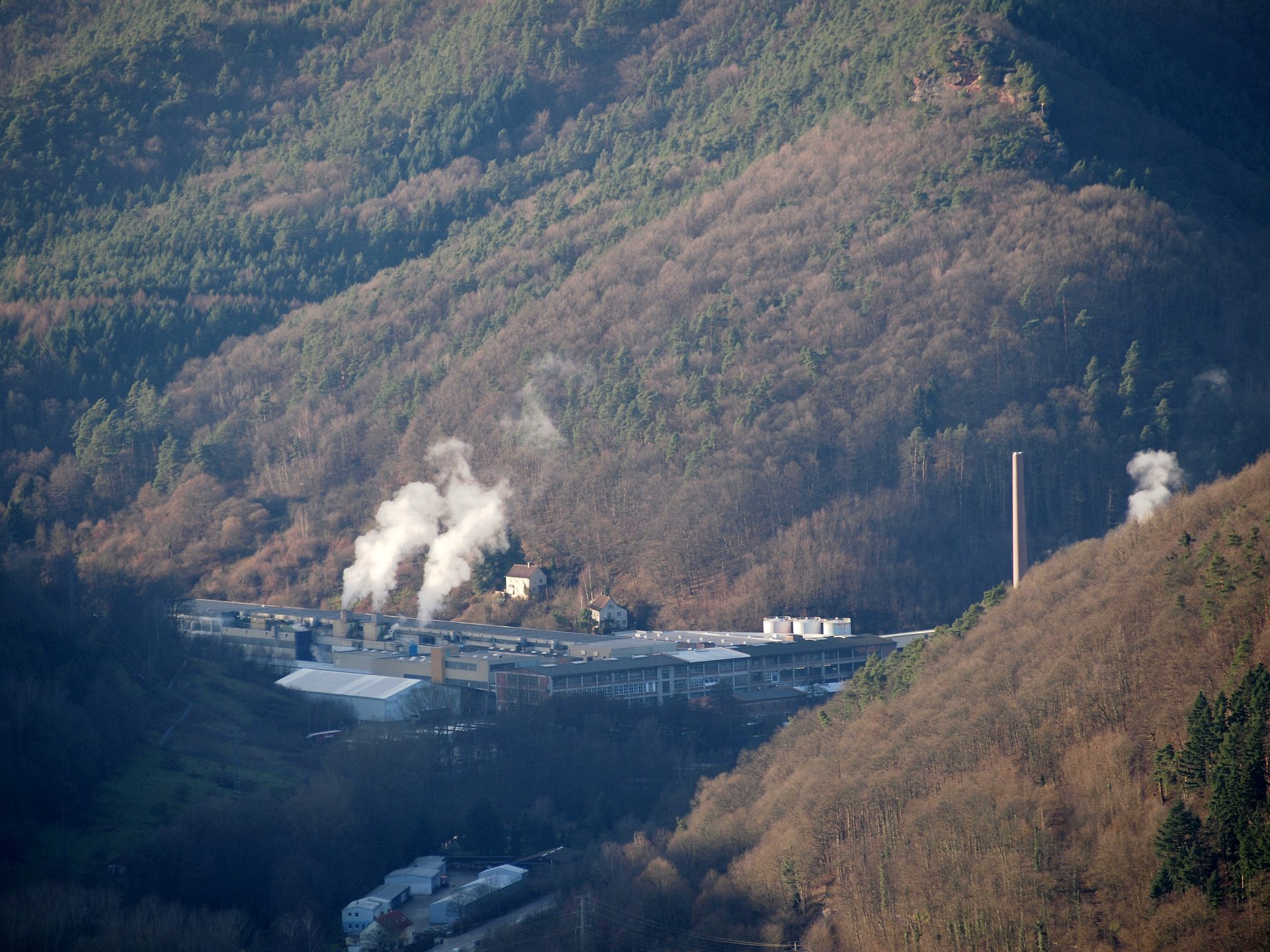
Cardboard factory in Sarnstall
