= Neuwied Zoo =

Zoo in Neuwied, Rhineland-Palatinate

Coordinates: 50.453°N 7.565°E

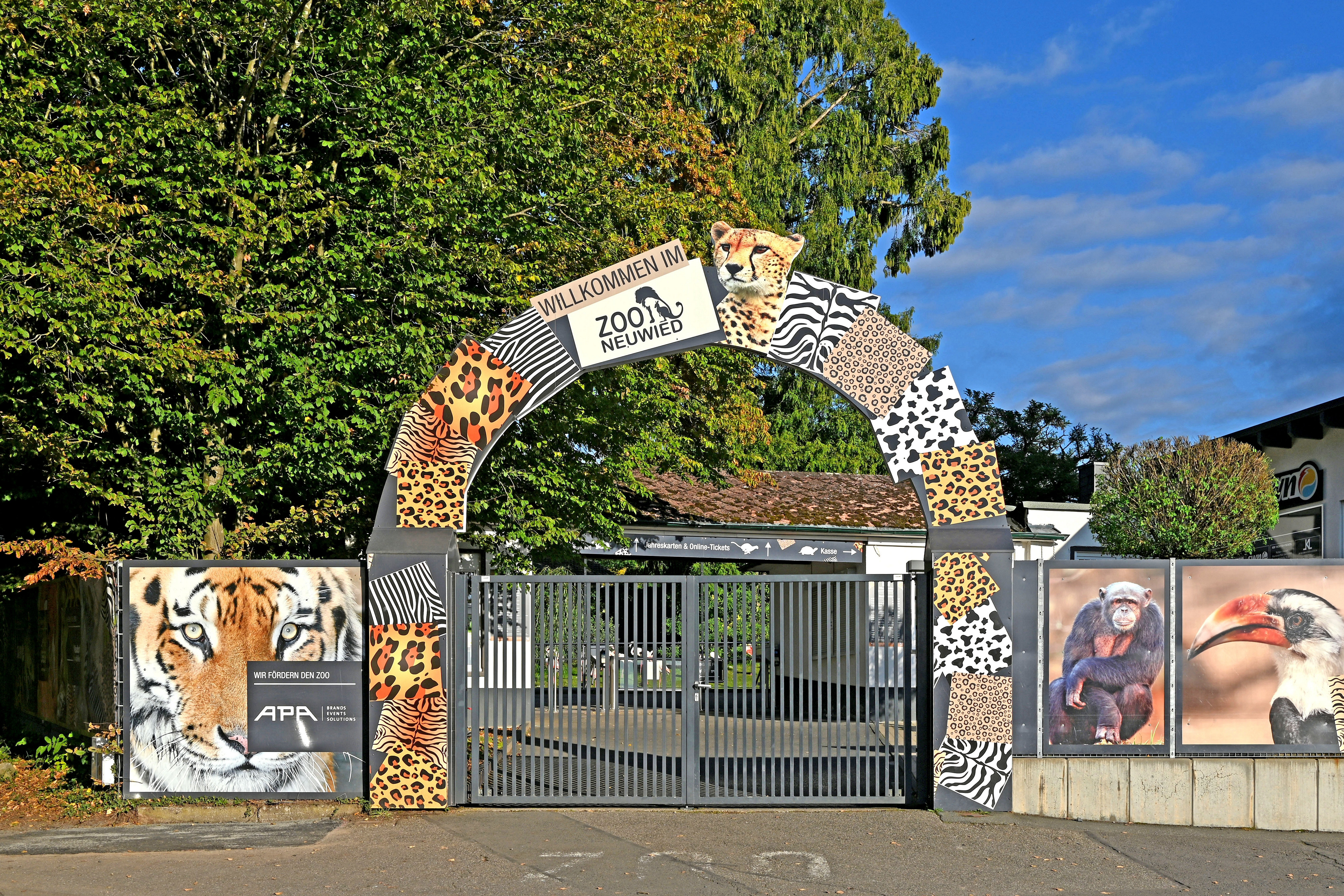
Neuwied Zoo entrance

The Neuwied Zoo (German: Zoo Neuwied) is a zoo located on the edge of the town of Neuwied, Rhineland-Palatinate. It borders the Rhine-Westerwald Nature Park. In 2007, the zoo had over 270,000 visitors.

== Current layout ==
The zoo covers an area of around 13.5 hectares and features around 1,543 animals of 183 species. This figure includes the largest herd of grey kangaroos outside of Australia in a roughly 3.5 hectare enclosure co-housed with red-necked wallabies and emus. Additionally since 2004, a small breeding pack of extinct in the wild Barbary lions have lived in the zoo, which brought ten cubs into the world up to 2010. Four chimpanzees and three different species of New-World monkey live in a large new primate house. Lions, tigers and cheetahs make up the group of big cats which have a feeding system not seen anywhere else in Germany. In a spacious open-air enclosure (the “African Savannah”), you can see a herd of Ankola-Watusi cattle which live alongside sitatungas and ostriches. In addition, there is a large aviary with southern ground hornbills.

== History ==
Neuwied Zoo was first opened to visitors in 1970. At that time, Australian animals were strongly represented. The main attractions were Tasmanian devils, echidnas, dingoes, wombats, cockatoos, quolls, black swans and a large herd of kangaroos.

Even in the early days, Neuwied Zoo had great success in terms of breeding. This included the first successful breeding of South African bonteboks in Germany as well as the world-first successful breeding of various species of parrot. Other breeding successes include Germany’s first natural breeding of ostriches with the eggs being successfully incubated by the animals themselves rather than through artificial means. A further success story was the breeding of pink-backed pelicans which are native to Madagascar and the southern half of Africa.

In 1980, the premises were leased by an animal dealer, who ran it as a private and animal trade zoo where privately owned animals could be displayed and then sold on. At times, even elephants, gorillas and hippopotamuses were housed in the zoo. As this led to problems with wildlife conservation rules, the animal dealer had to give up the premises in 1985. The zoo almost closed down at this time.

In 1984 a group of dedicated citizens founded a zoo society, which was mainly financed through donations, proceeds from animal sales and the income from zoo admission fees. Since the society took over the zoo, Neuwied Zoo has noticeably changed and has been led in a scientific direction, initially under the biologist Heinrich Klein. Amongst other changes, an exotic animal house with terrariums for reptiles and aviaries was built; the carnivore house was enlarged; and a large seal exhibit with an underwater observation tunnel and North Sea ambience was created.

In 2000, a new lemur house with an outdoor enclosure for white-headed lemurs was built. In 2003, the new lion exhibit was completed and in 2004 a penguin exhibit was introduced to house 14 Humboldt penguins. In 2005, ten nasue moved in to a new exhibit and in 2006 a new primate house was completed. The former area of the chimpanzee exhibit was converted in 2008 into a New World monkey exhibit with an area of around 100m^{2} and an average height of eight metres, lined with rock face walls. In the spring of 2010, meerkats moved in to the zoo for the first time. They live in the completely redesigned former banded mongoose enclosure. In early summer 2010, the expanded tiger exhibit was opened. In the large open-air exhibit, the big cats can swim in two bathing ponds and have more than 1000m^{2} of space at their disposal. In May 2011, a further milestone in the zoo’s history was celebrated as the old reptile house turned 50 years old. The new exotic animal house was built as much for breeding as it was for visitors. Snakes, lizards, monitor lizards and many other reptiles can be seen in the exotic animal house and for the first time in the history of the zoo, there are also crocodiles. This exotic animal house has 500m^{2} of exhibition space and visitors can see 38 large exhibits with reptiles, insects, spiders, birds and mammals which prefer a warm temperature all-year round. In total, more than 120 animals of 44 species live here. In 2012, the griffon vulture exhibit was completely redesigned as a cliff landscape, several nesting areas and a pond were installed. In 2013, the breeding facilities for the cheetahs were completely renovated.

Neuwied Zoo continues to have breeding success stories to this day. The largest success was the birth of ten cheetah cubs on the same day, of which eight lived into adulthood.

Neuwied Zoo also offers an educational program for schools as well as children’s parties. A petting zoo and nature trail supplement this program.

== Gallery ==
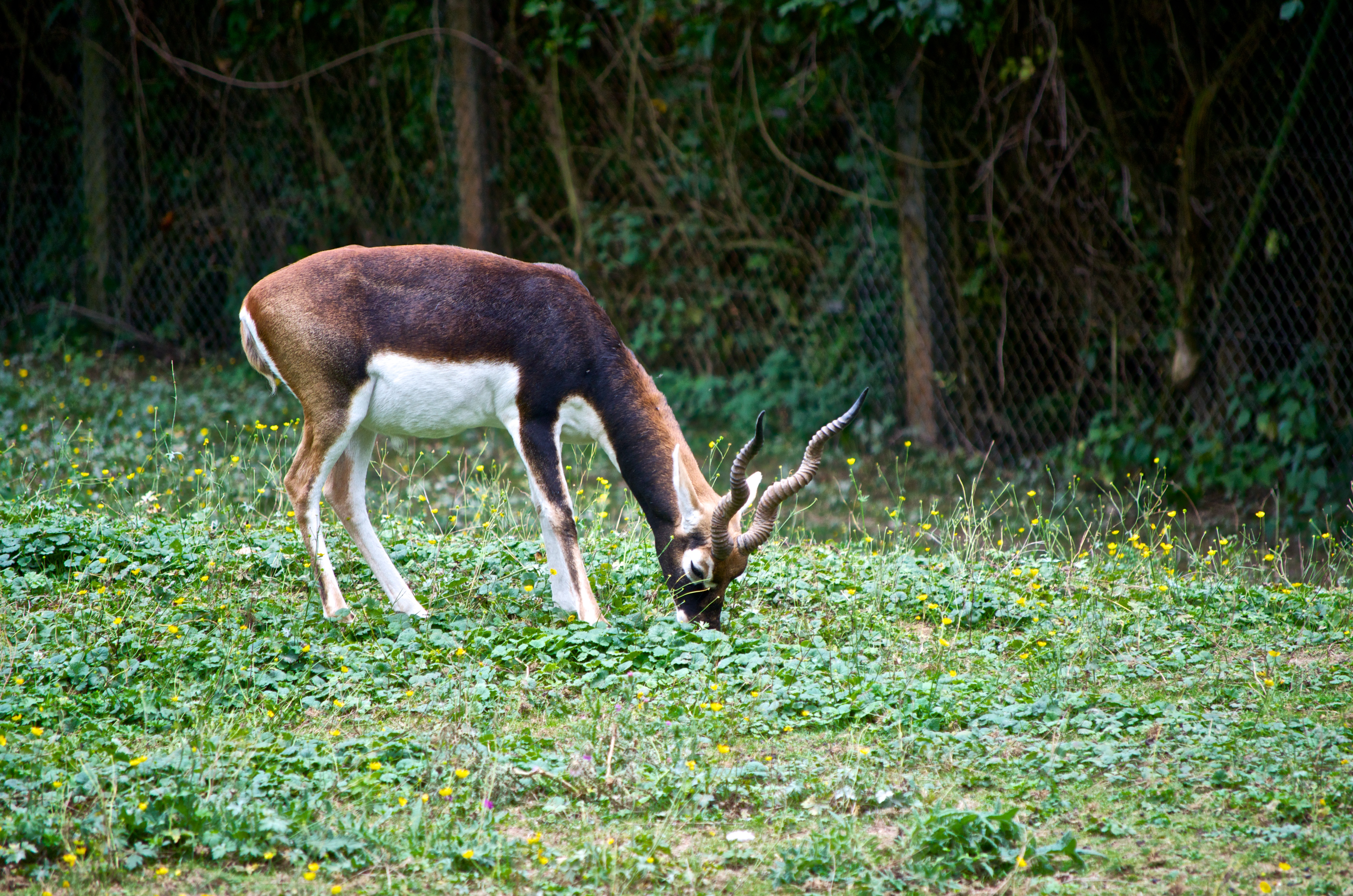
Blackbuck antelope

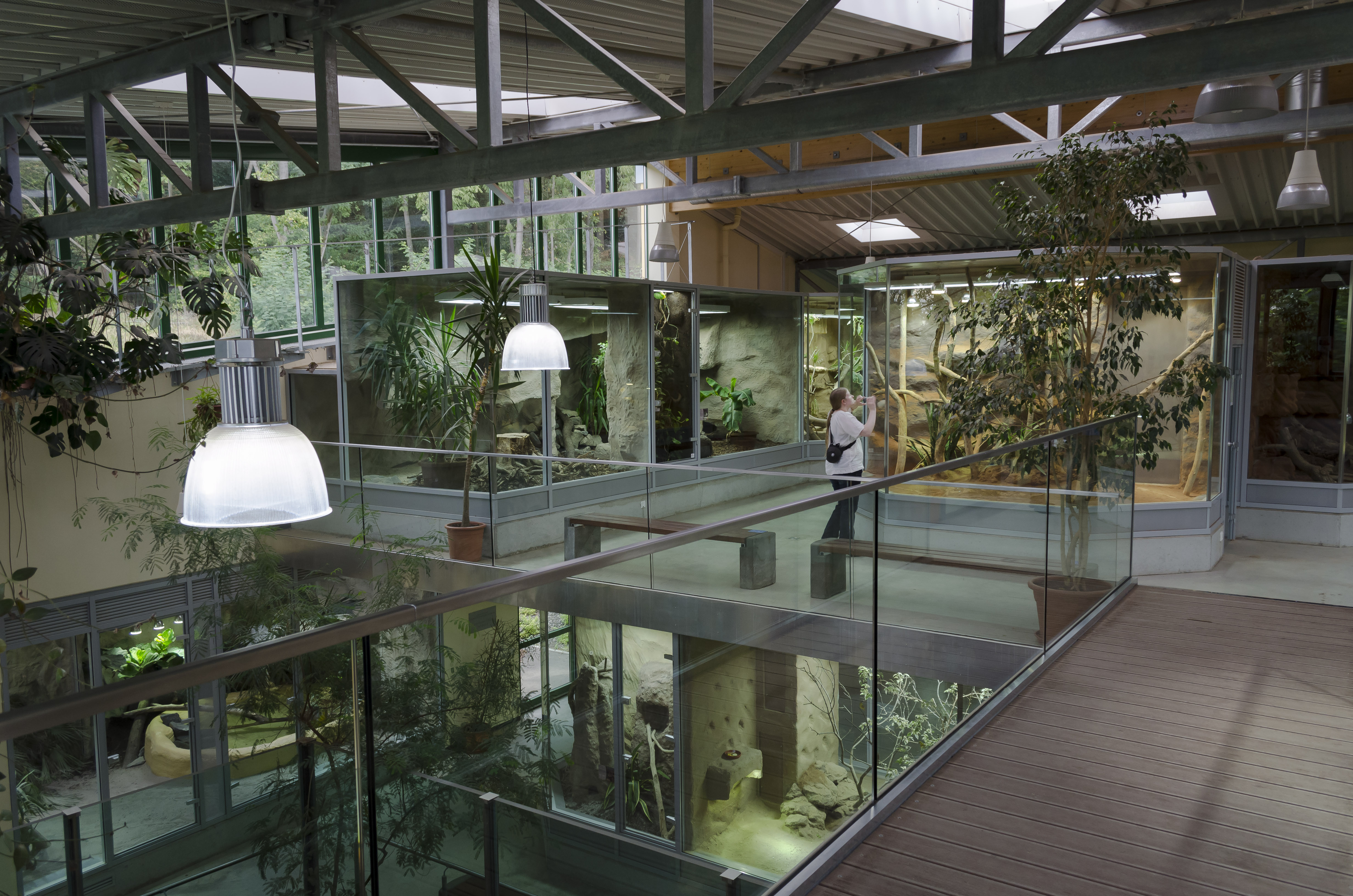
Inside view of the exotic animal house

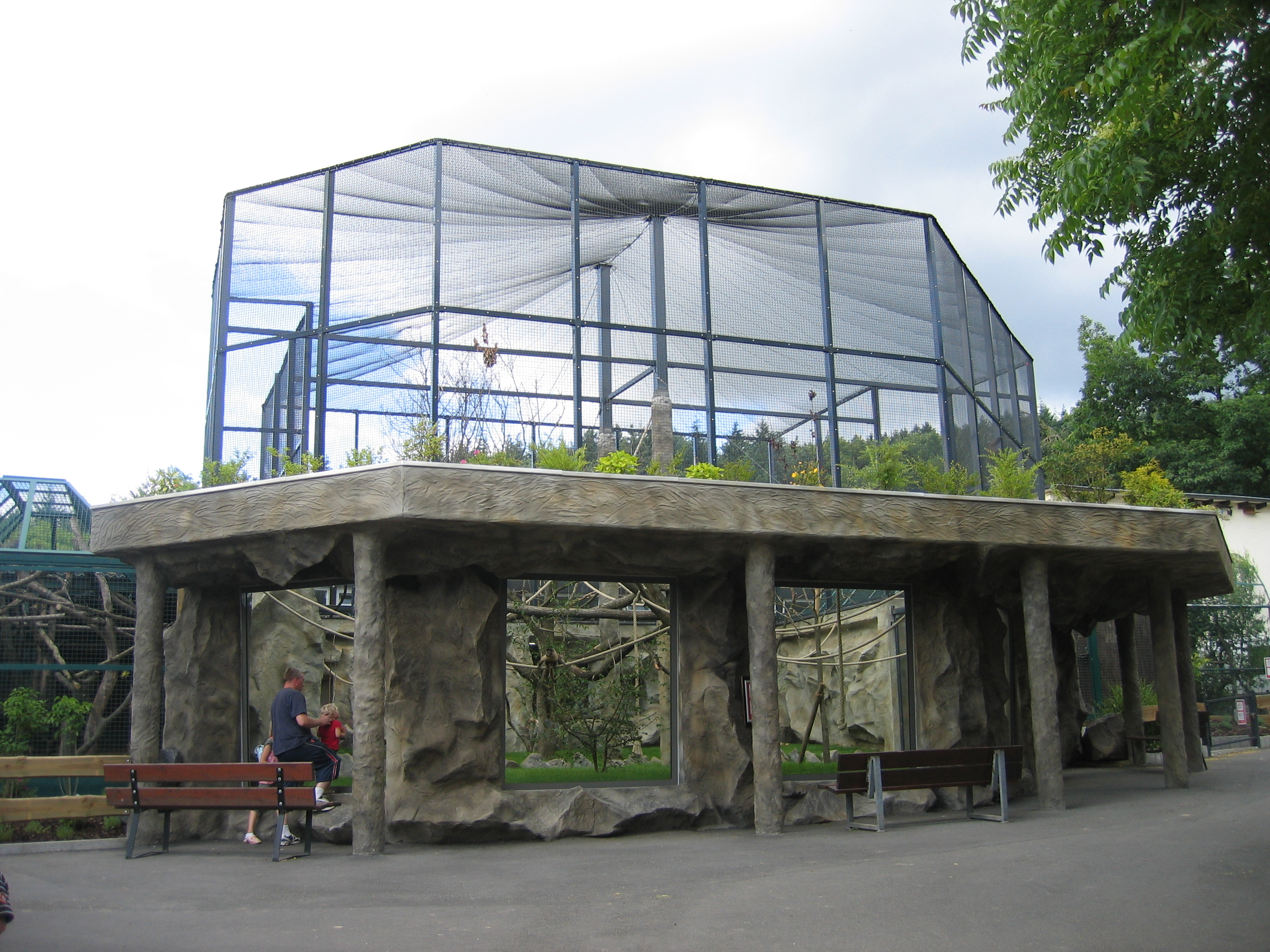
Primate house

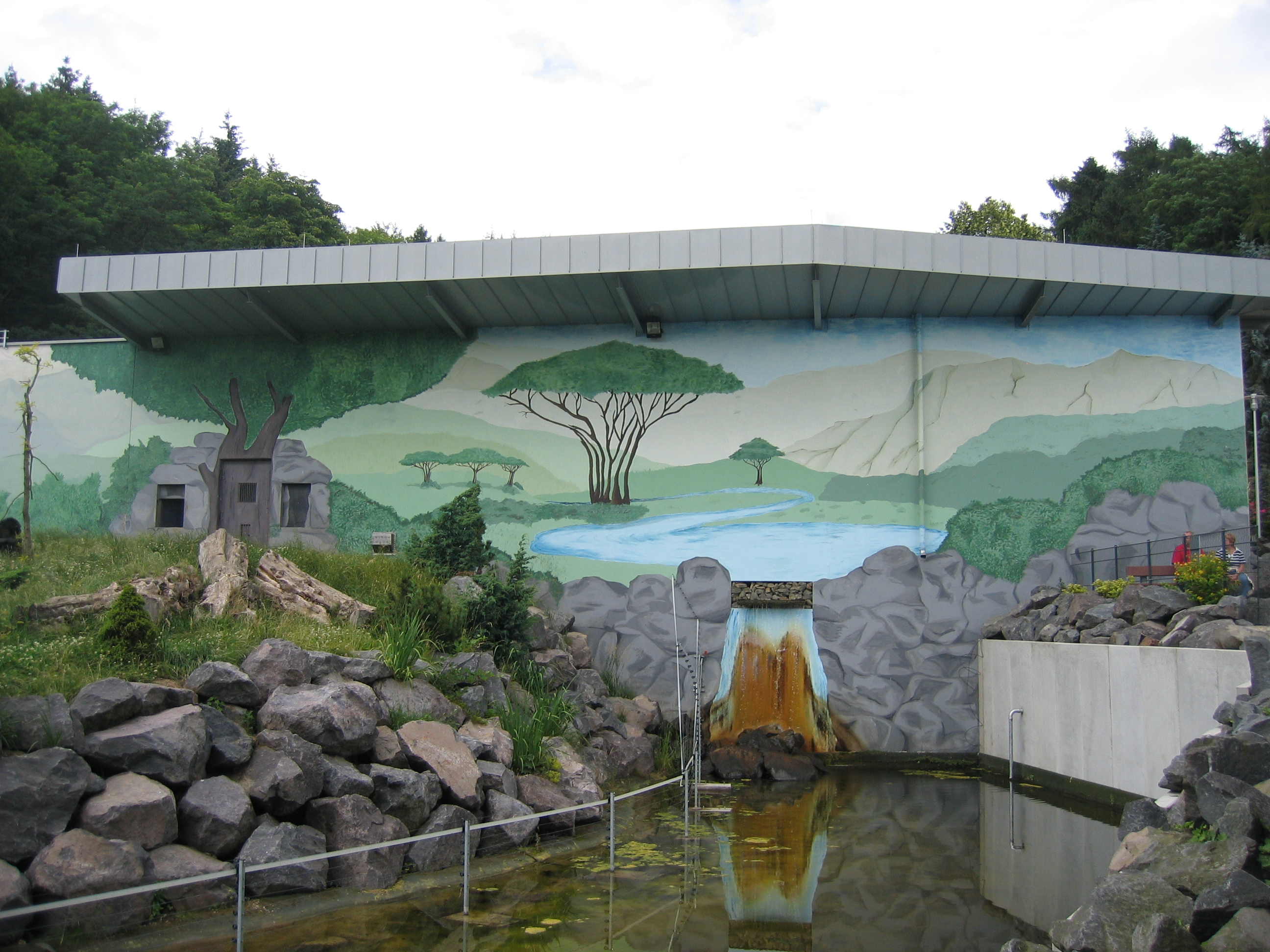
Primate house with open-air enclosure

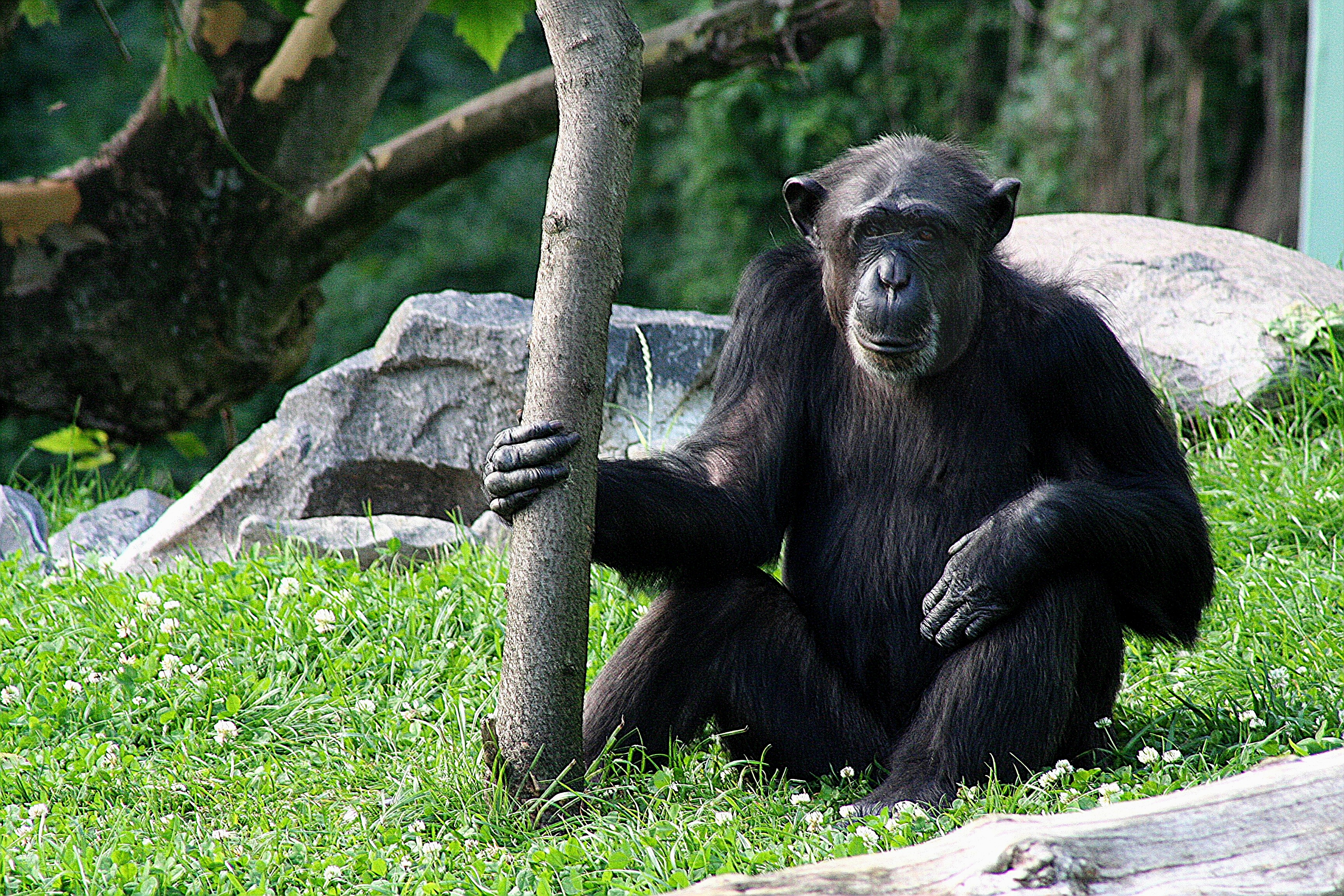
Chimpanzee in open-air area of the primate house

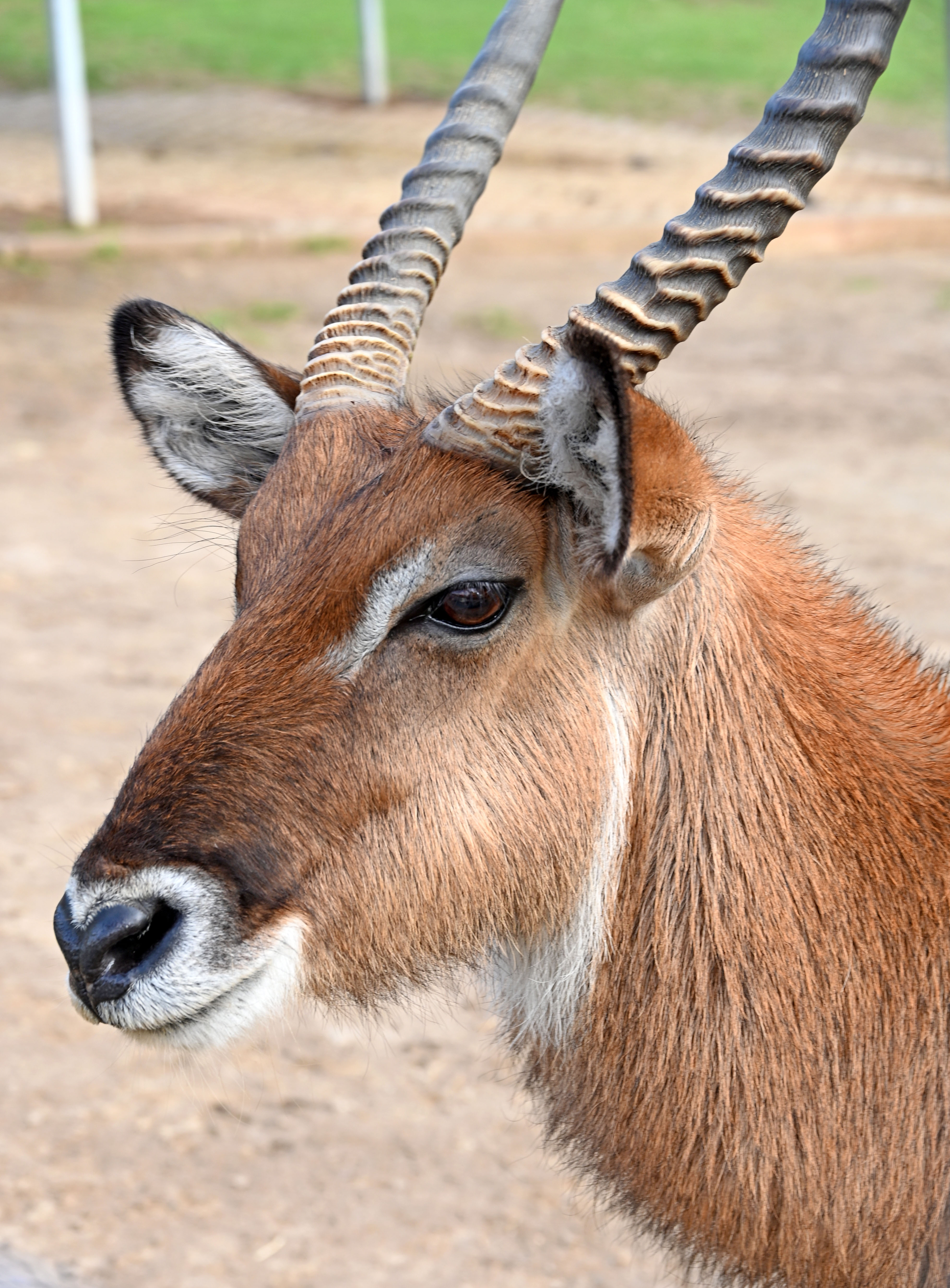
Waterbuck

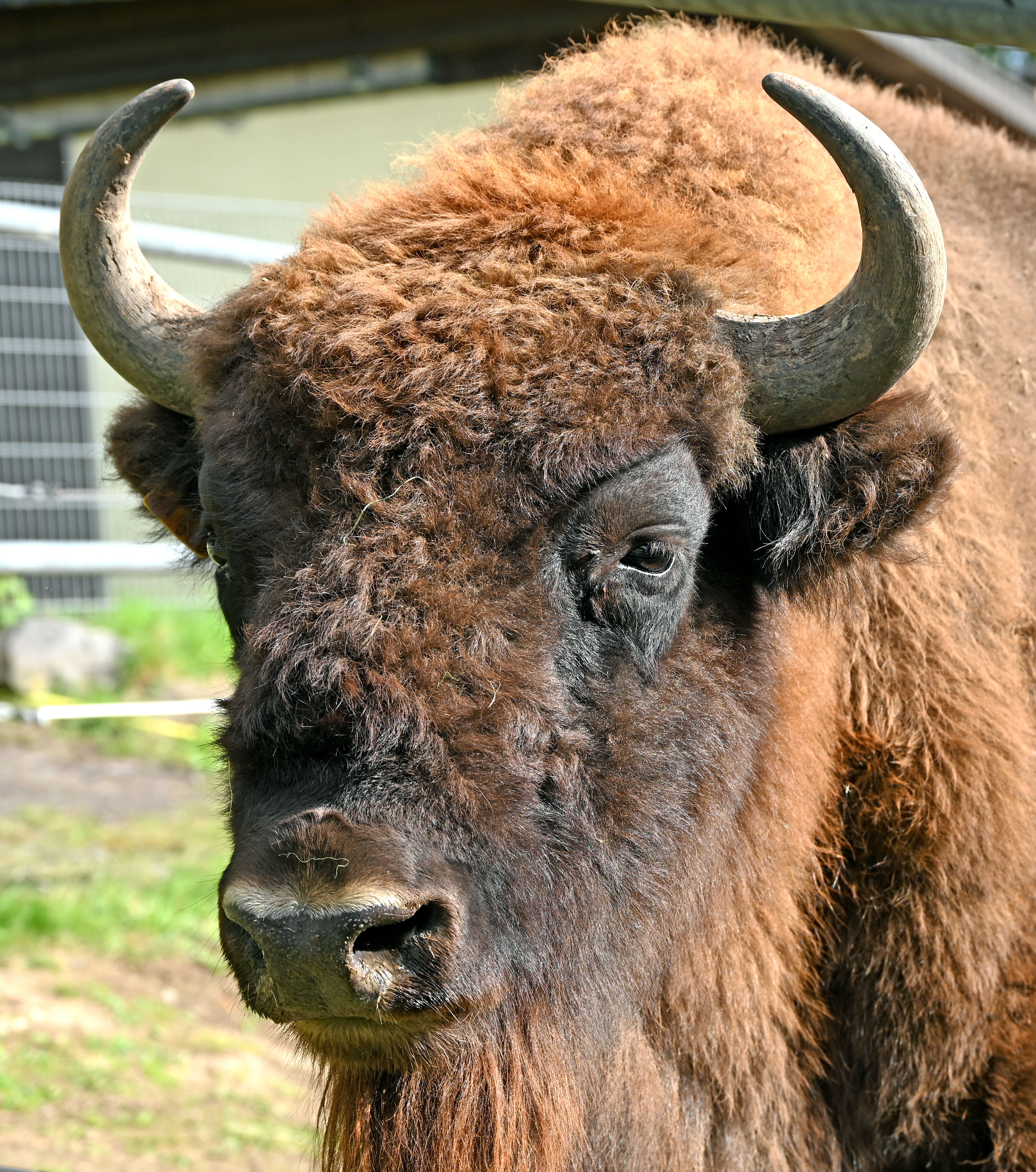
American bison

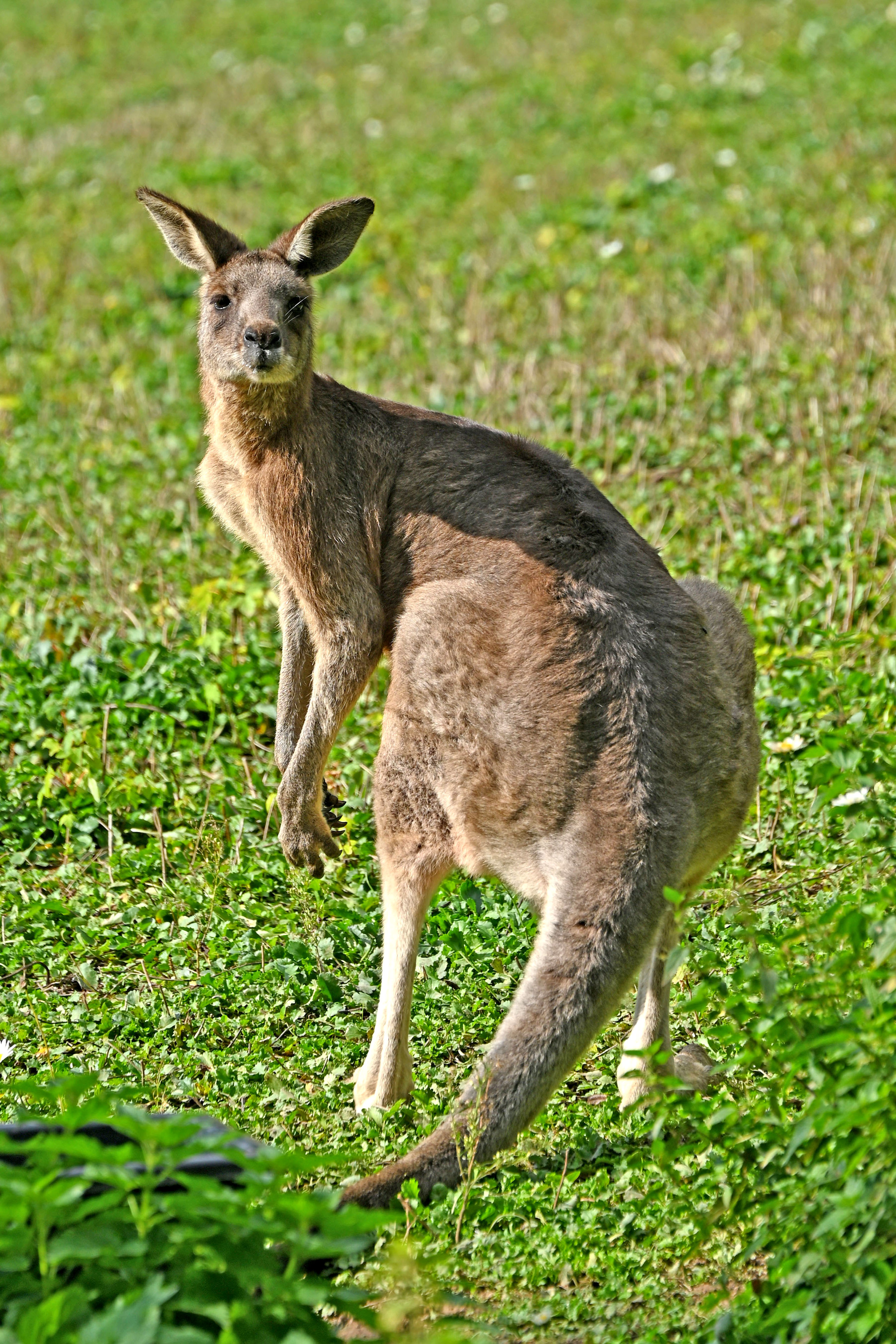
Eastern Grey Kangaroo

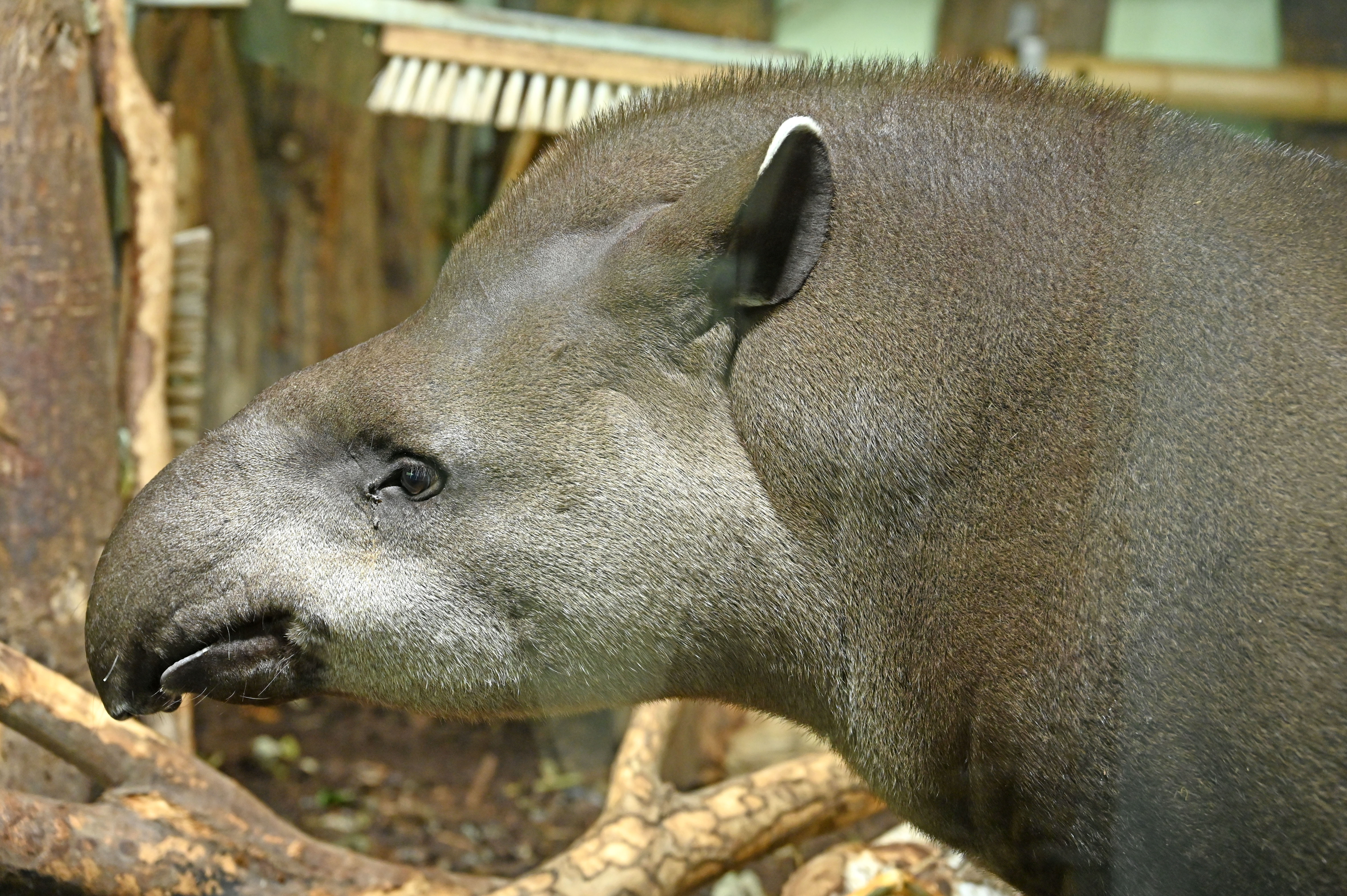
Lowland Tapir

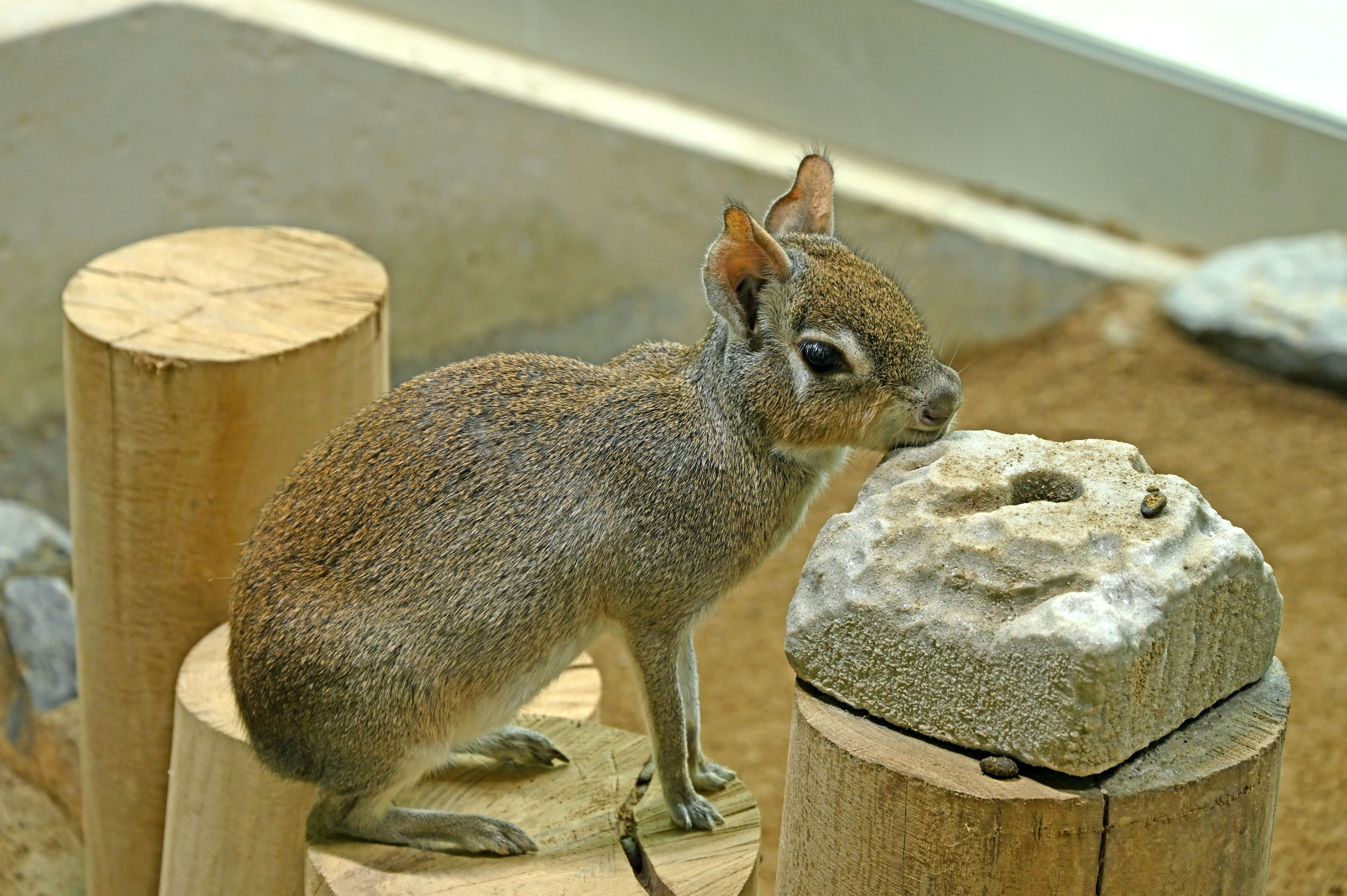
Chacoan Mara

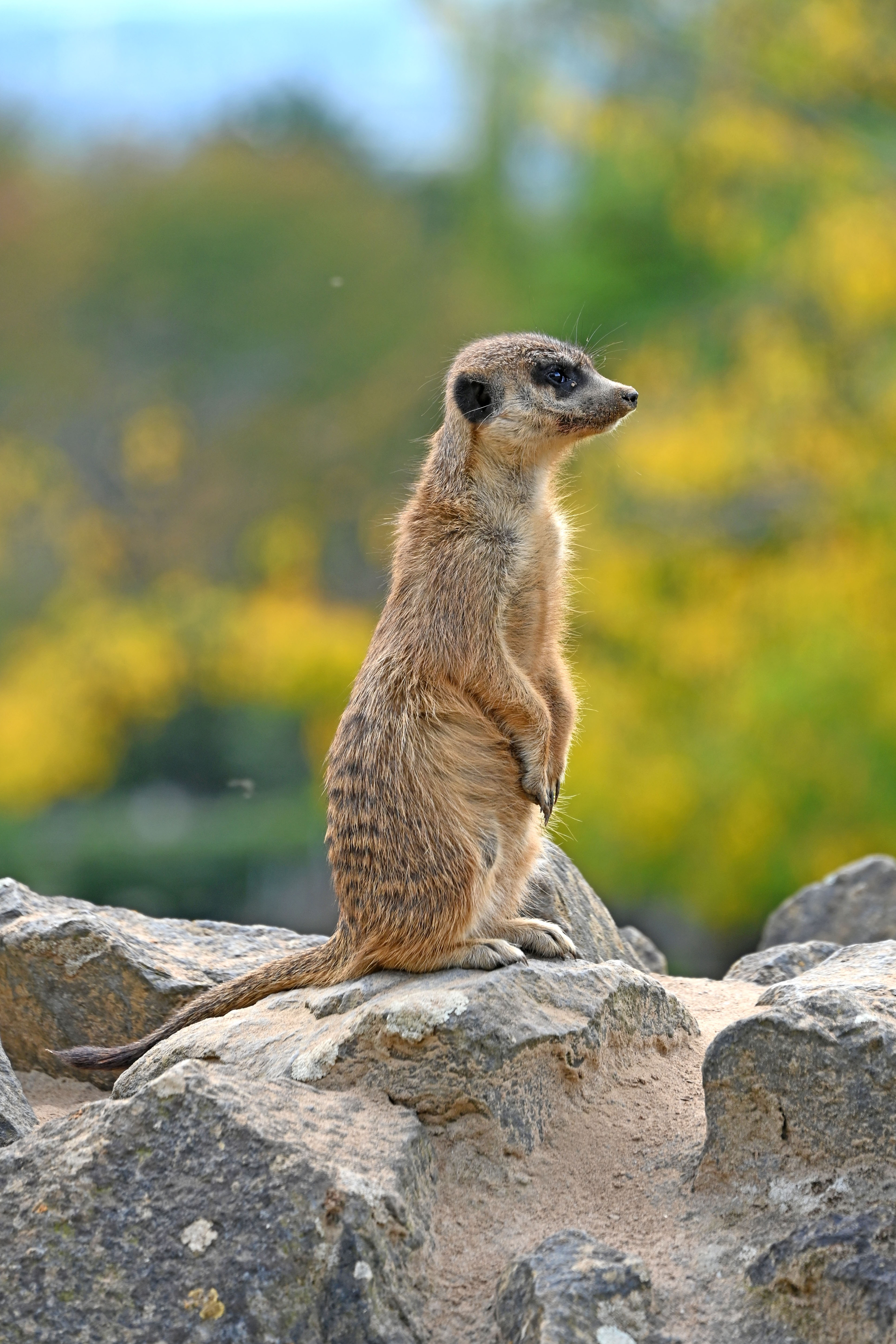
Slender-tailed Meerkat

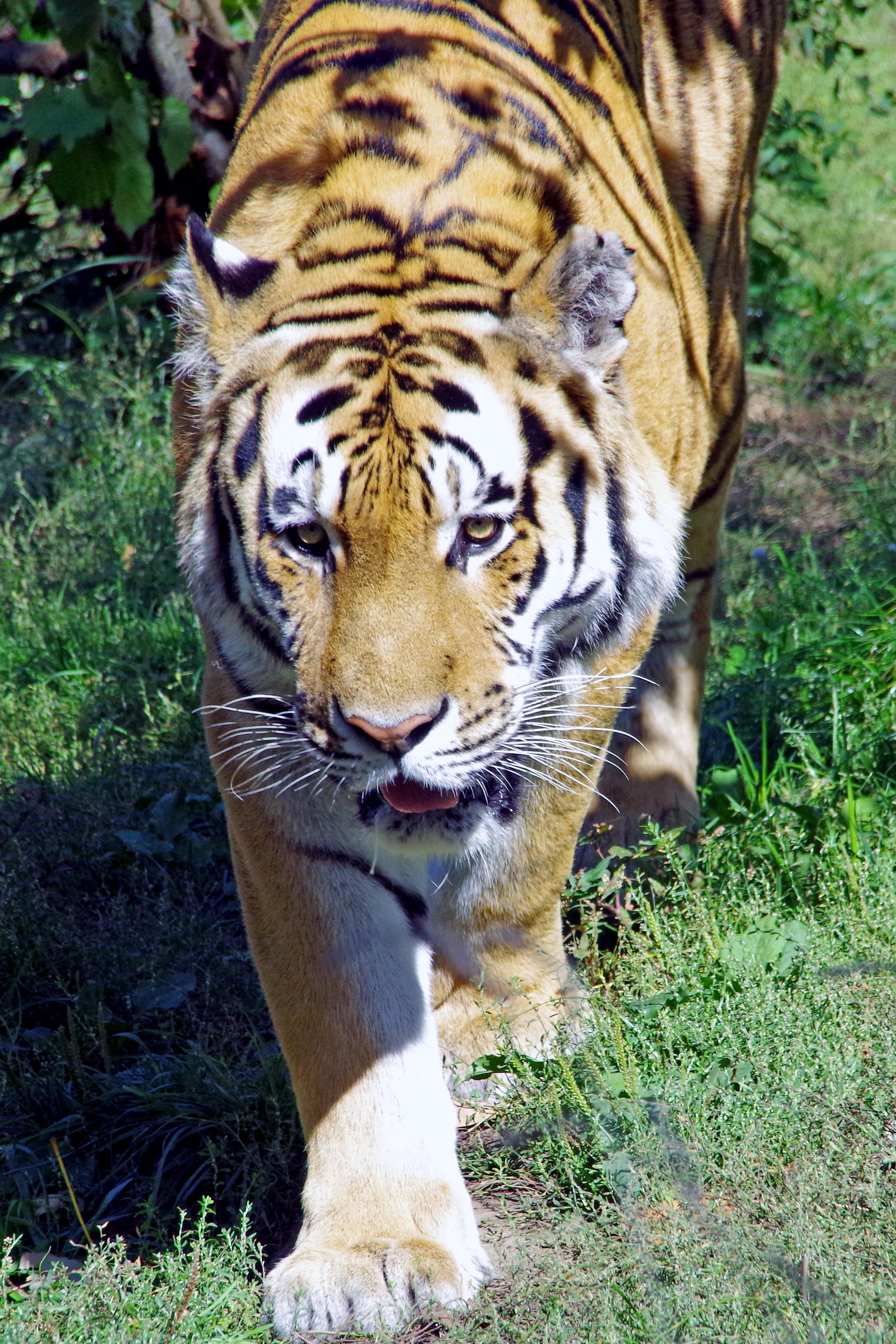
Tiger

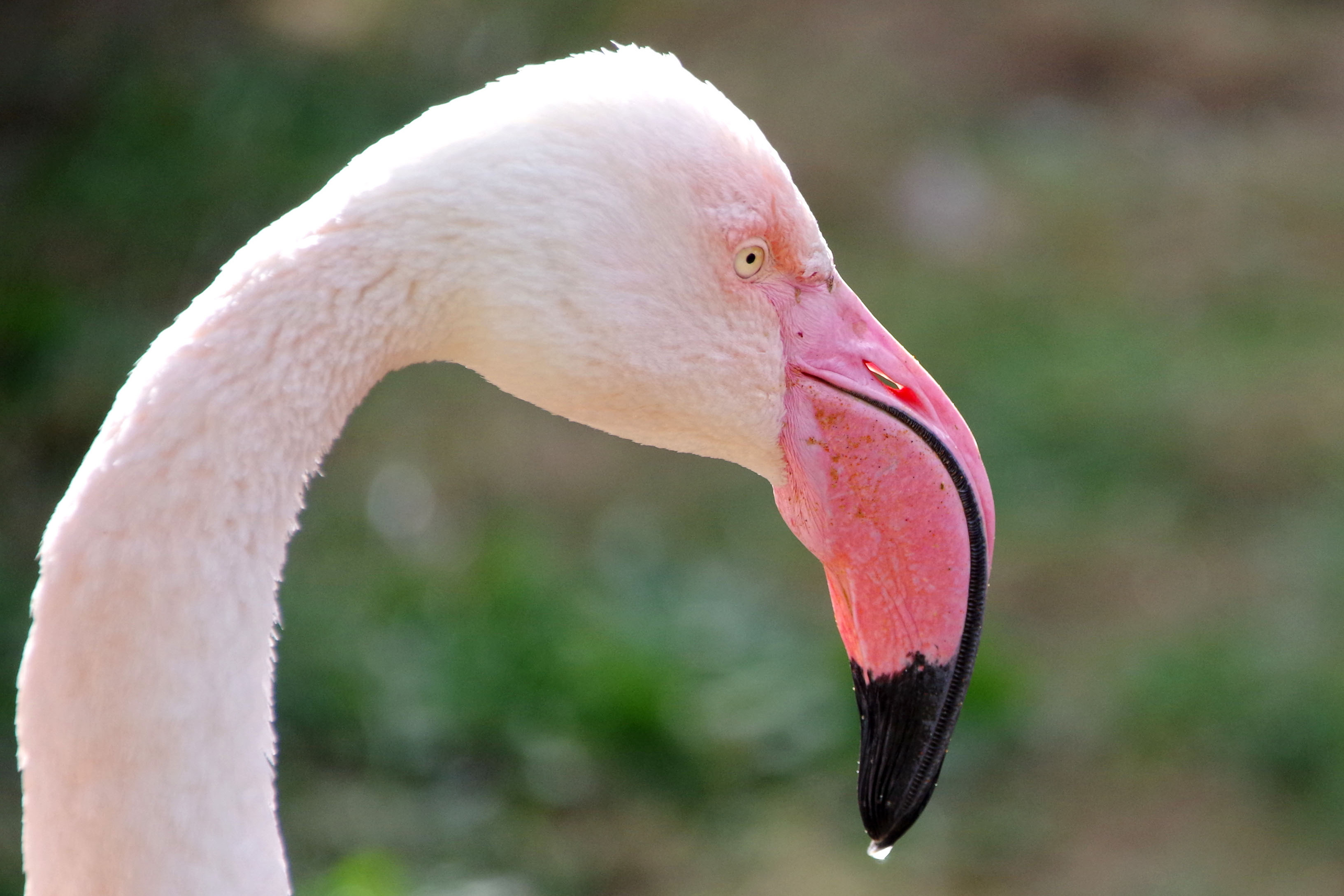
Greater Flamingo

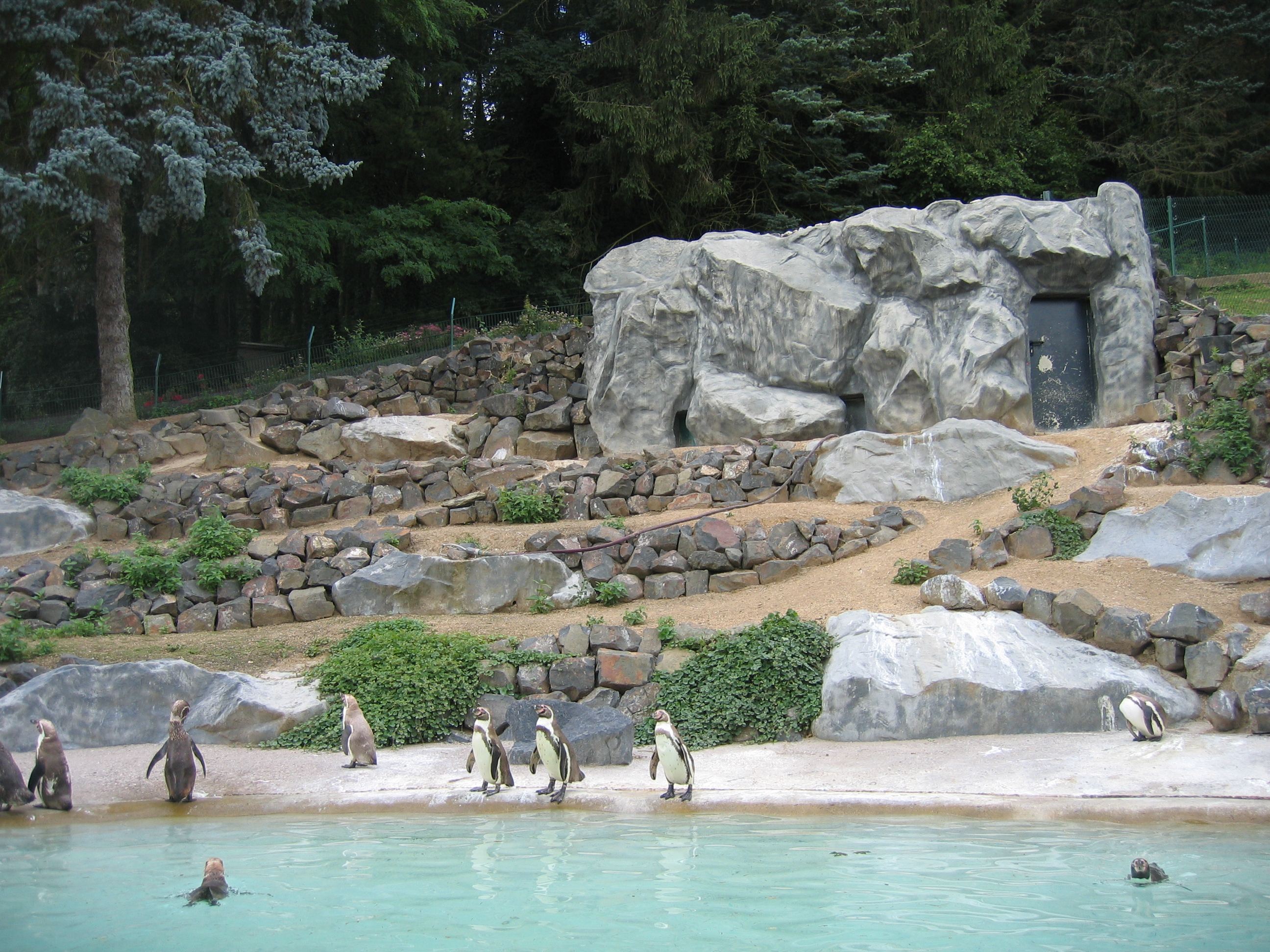
Penguin pool

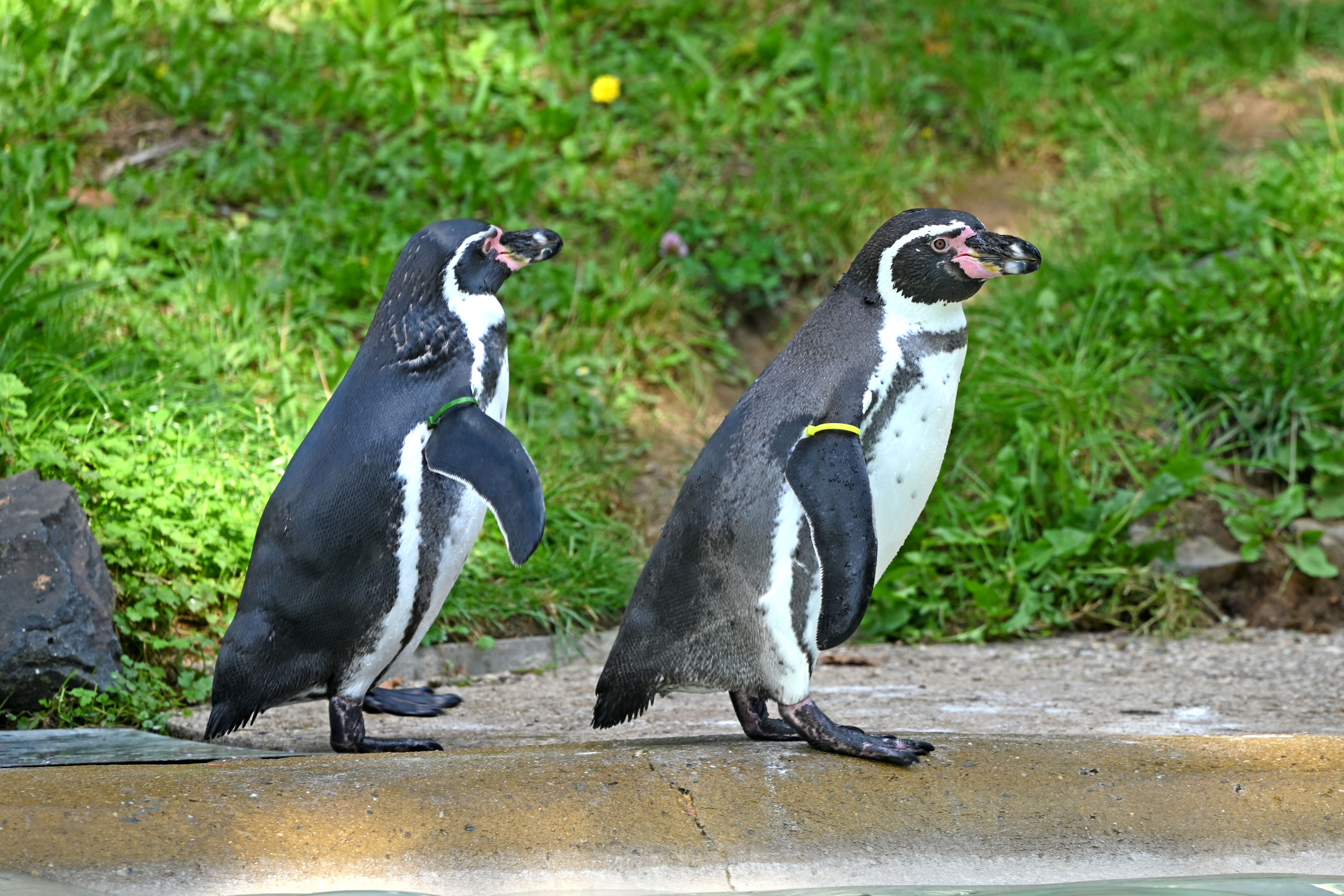
Humboldt Penguin
