= Copulation (zoology) =

Animal sexual reproductive act in which a male introduces sperm into the female's body

In zoology, copulation is animal sexual behavior in which a male introduces sperm into the female's body, especially directly into the female's reproductive tract. This is an aspect of mating. Many aquatic animals use external fertilization, whereas internal fertilization may have developed from a need to maintain gametes in a liquid medium in the Late Ordovician epoch. Internal fertilization with many vertebrates (such as all reptiles, some fish, and most birds) occurs via cloacal copulation, known as cloacal kiss, while most mammals copulate vaginally, and many basal vertebrates reproduce sexually with external fertilization.

== Spiders and insects ==
Spiders have separate male and female sexes. Before mating and copulation, the male spider spins a small web and ejaculates on to it. It then stores the sperm in reservoirs on its large pedipalps, from which it transfers sperm to the female's genitals. The females can store sperm indefinitely.

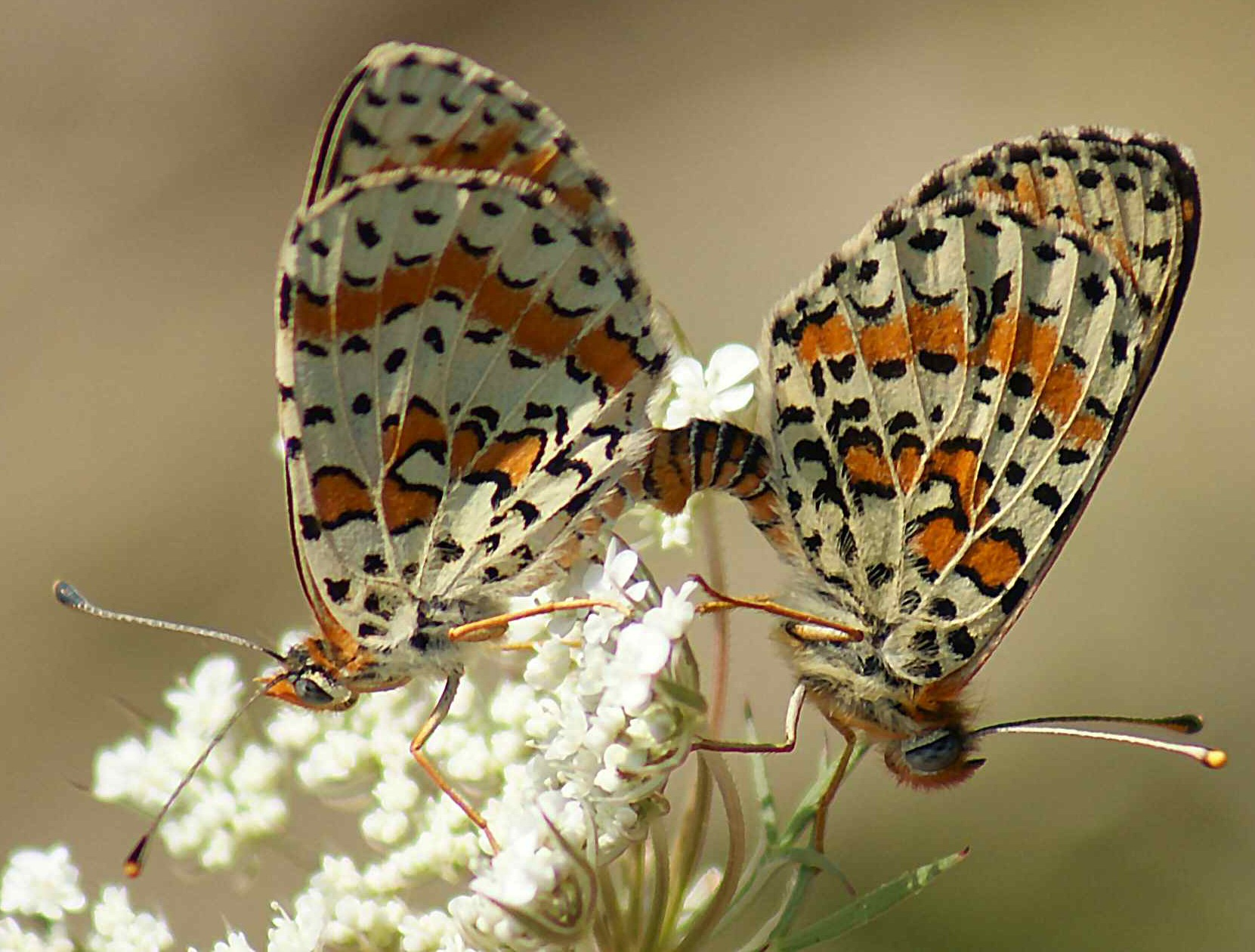
Butterflies mating

For primitive insects, the male deposits spermatozoa on the substrate, sometimes stored within a special structure; courtship involves inducing the female to take up the sperm package into its genital opening, but there is no actual copulation. In groups that have reproduction similar to spiders, such as dragonflies, males extrude sperm into secondary copulatory structures removed from their genital opening, which are then used to inseminate the female. In dragonflies, it is a set of modified sternites on the second abdominal segment. In advanced groups of insects, the male uses its aedeagus, a structure formed from the terminal segments of the abdomen, to deposit sperm directly (though sometimes in a capsule called a spermatophore) into the female's reproductive tract.

== In mammals ==
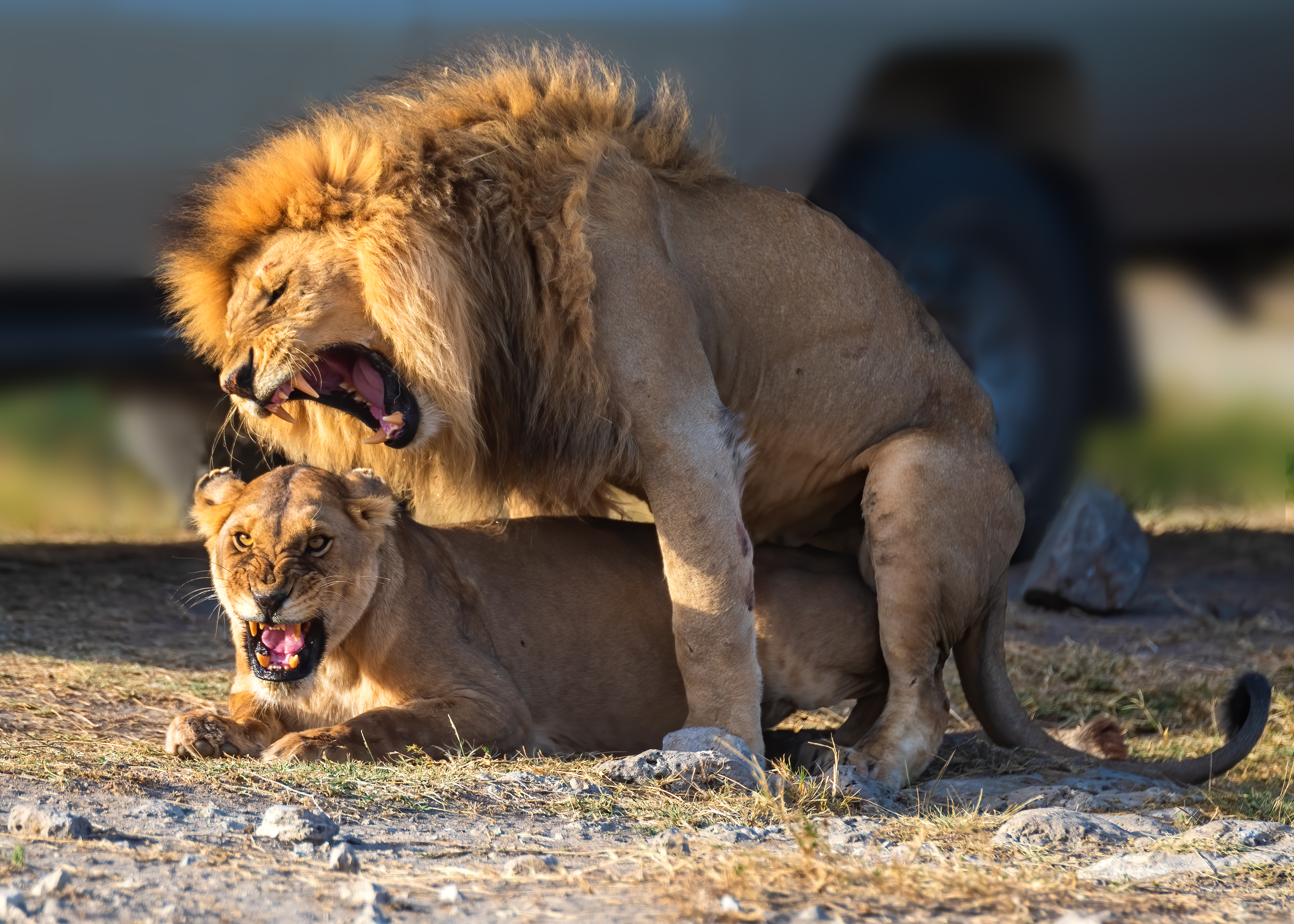
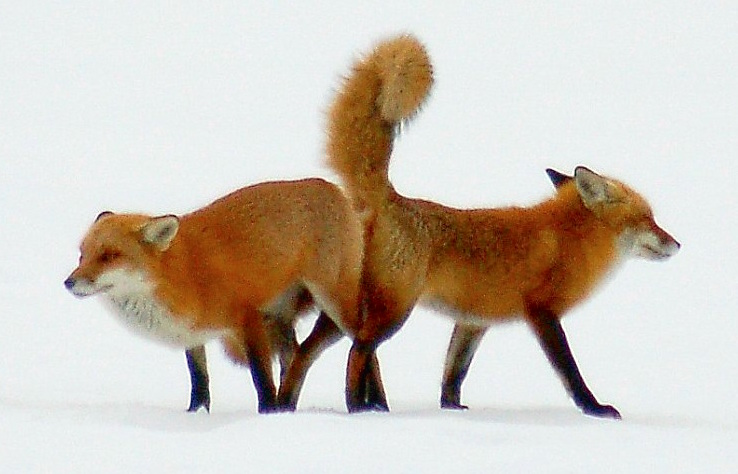
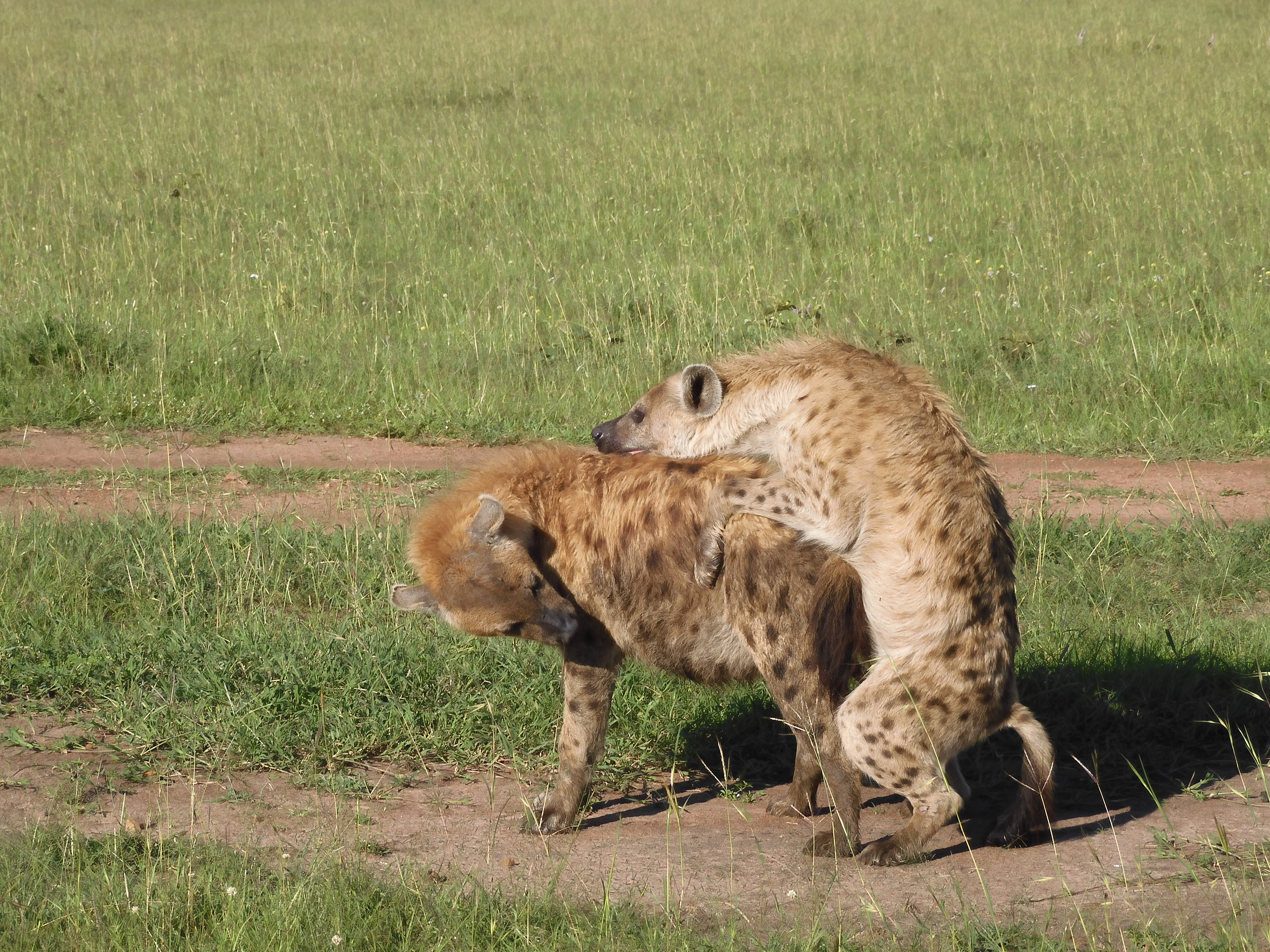
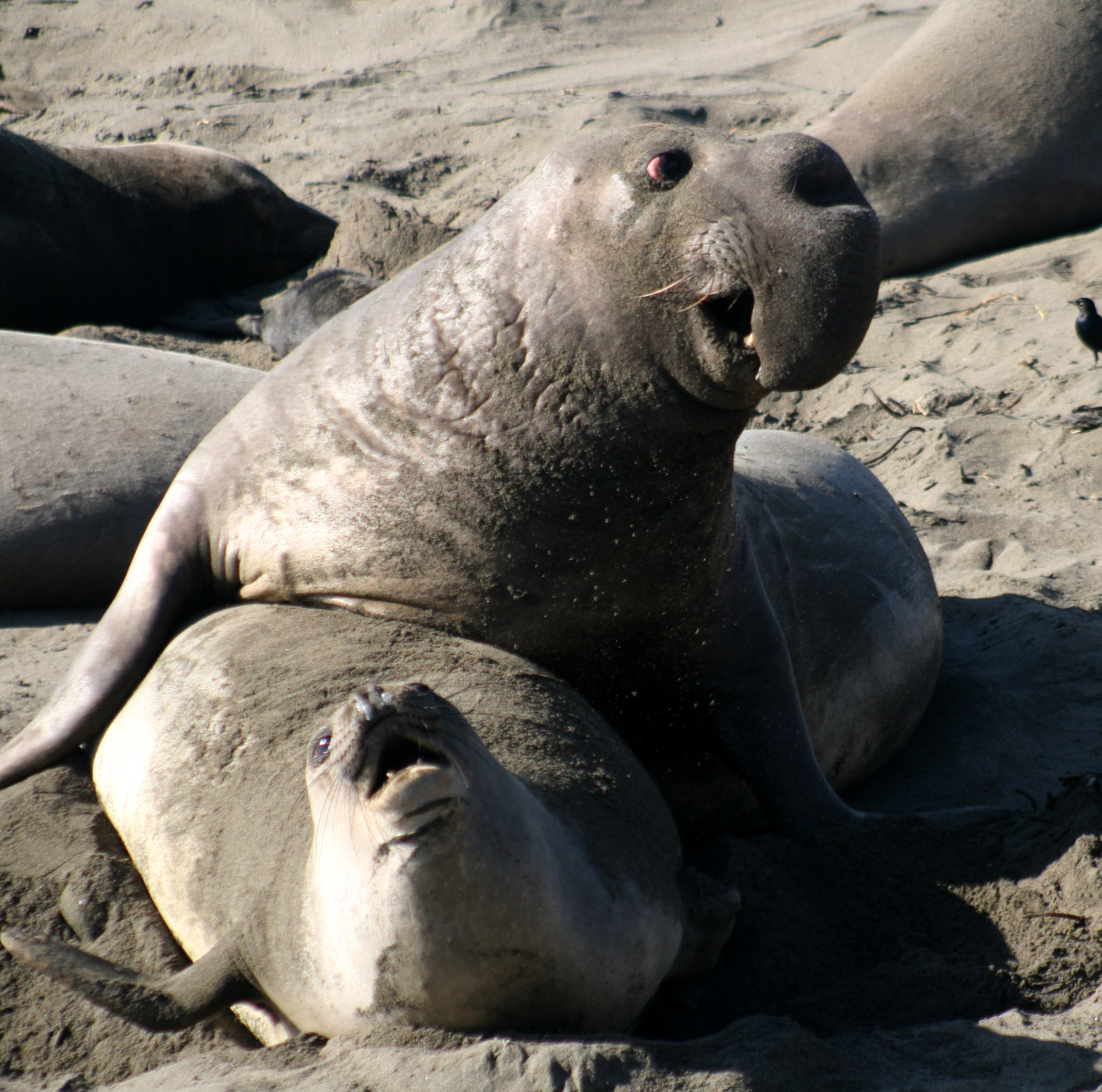
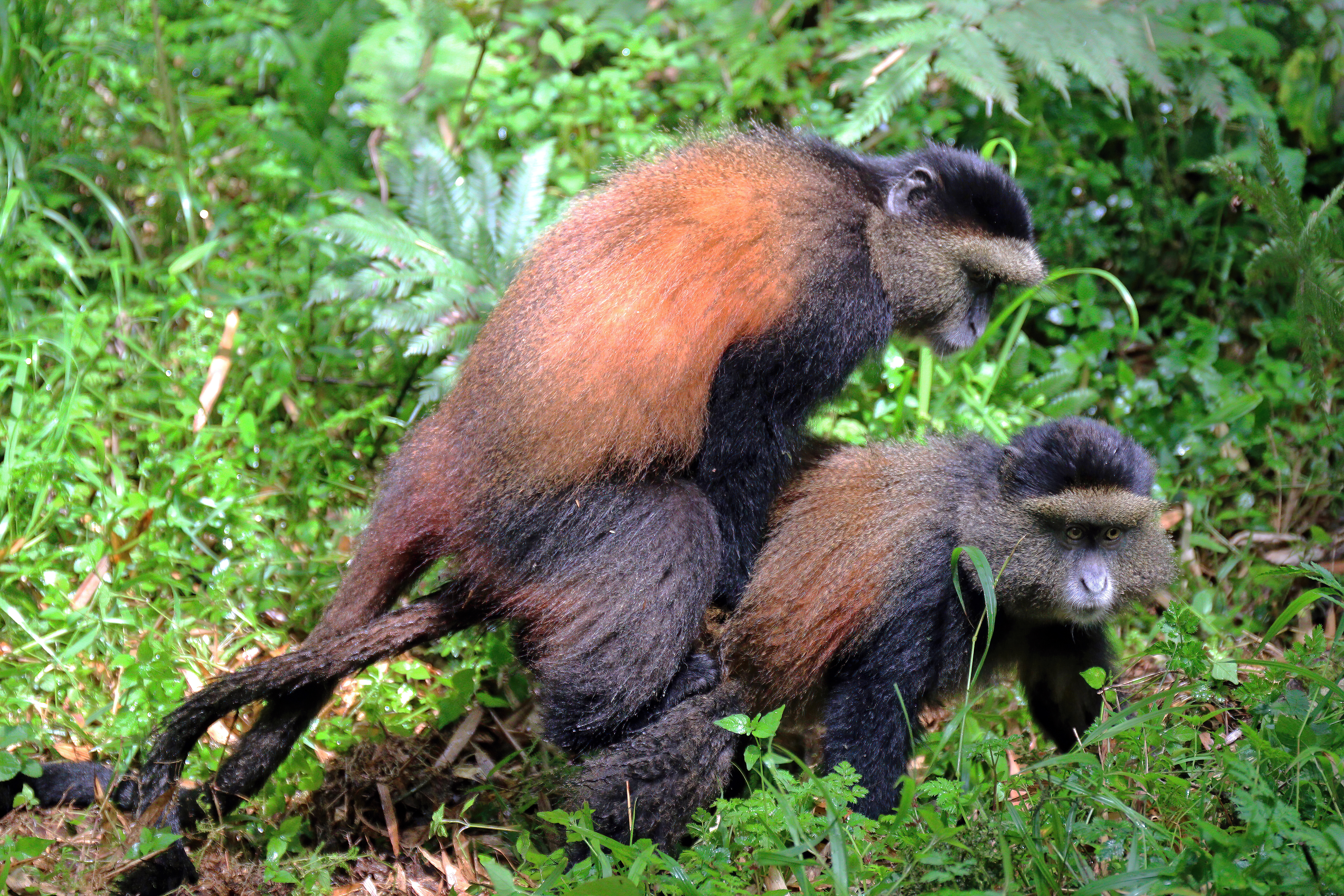
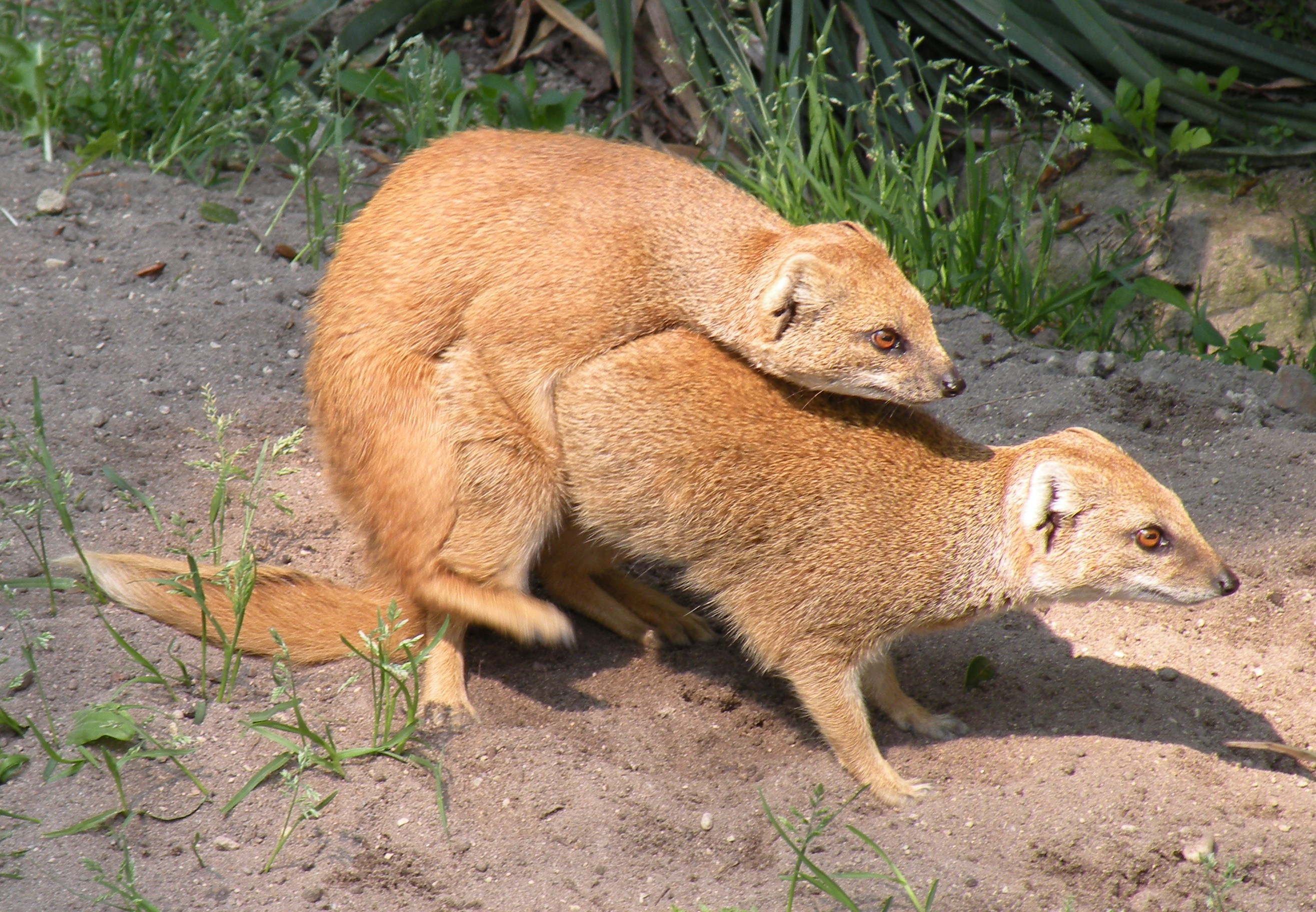
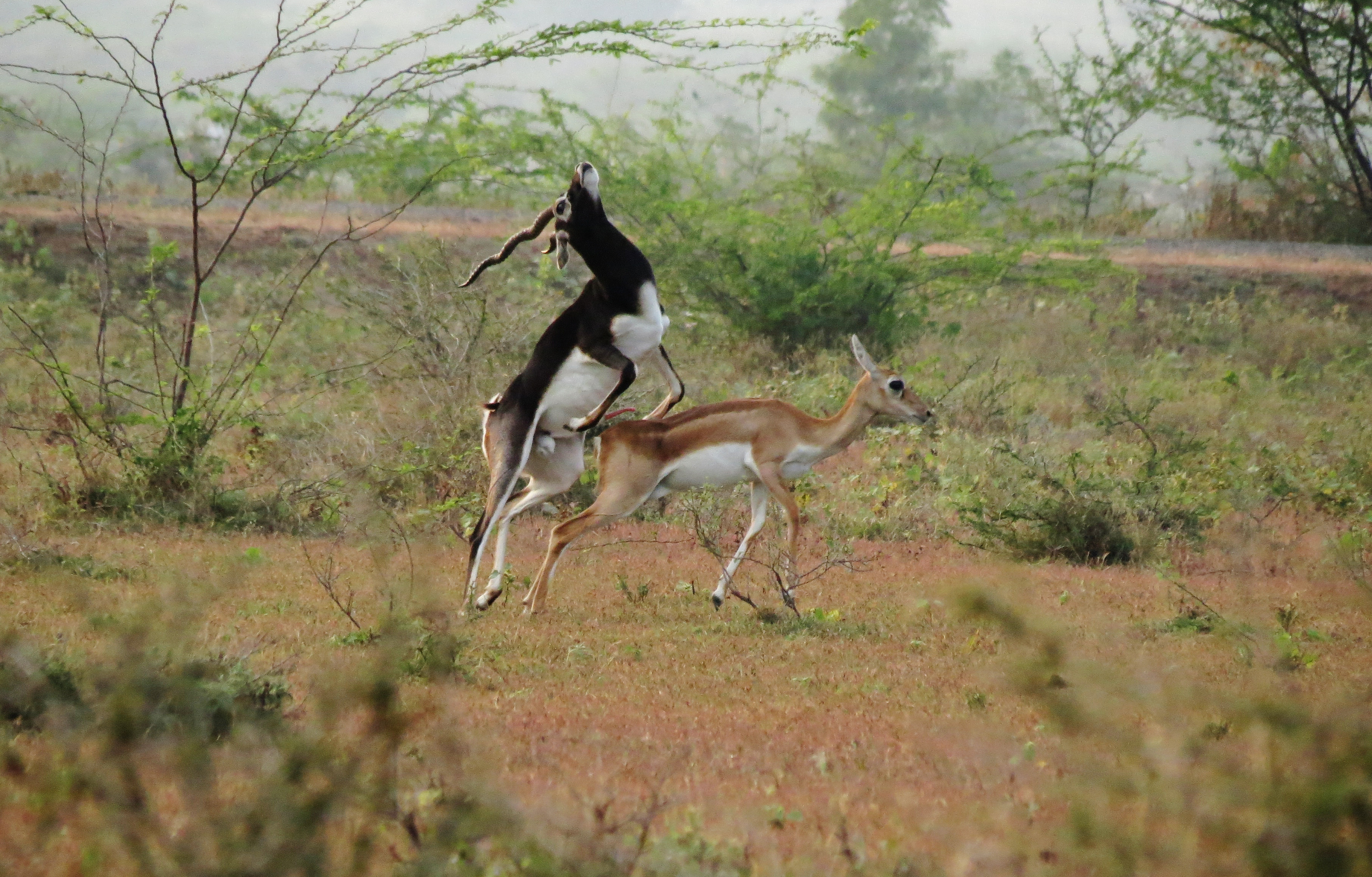
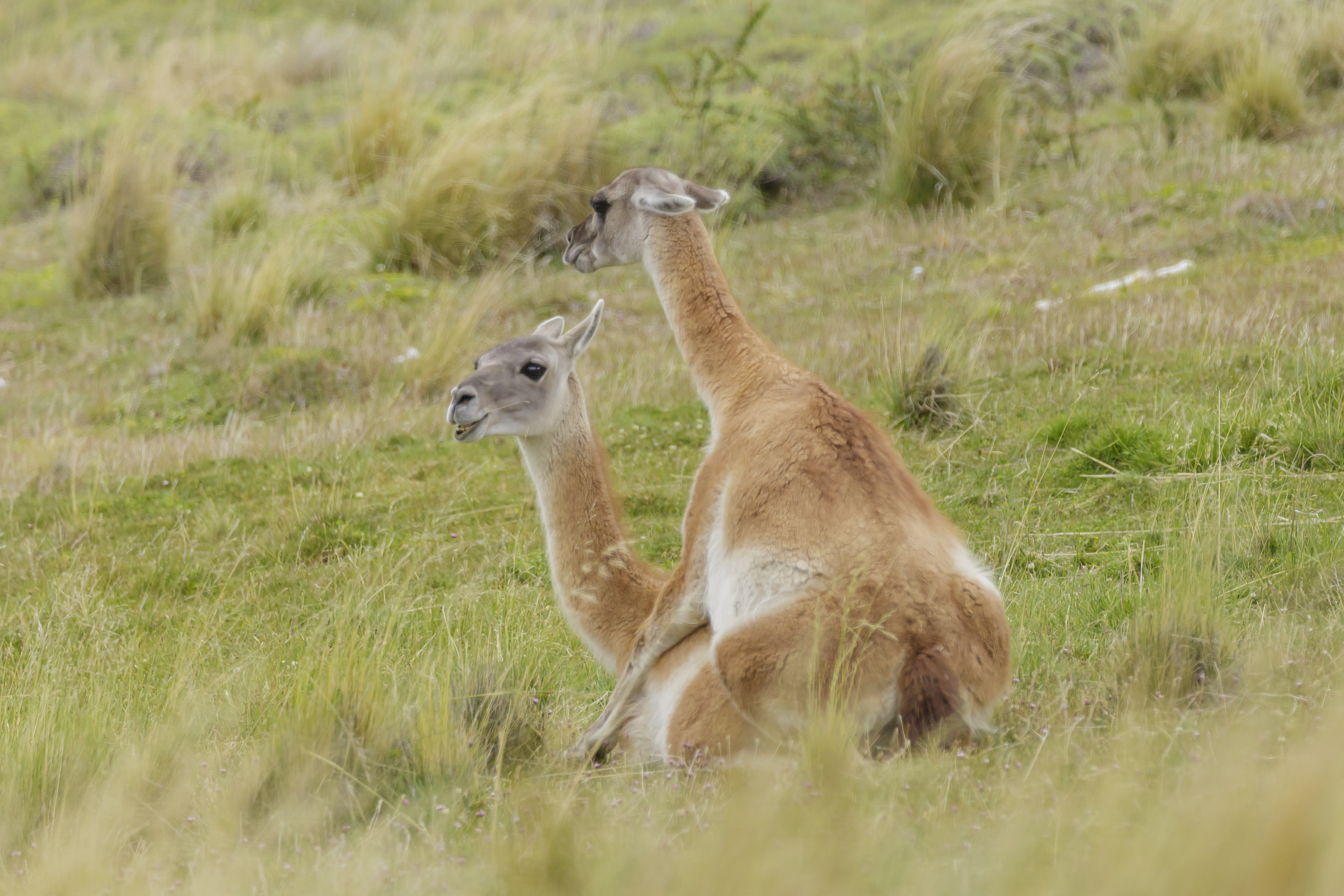
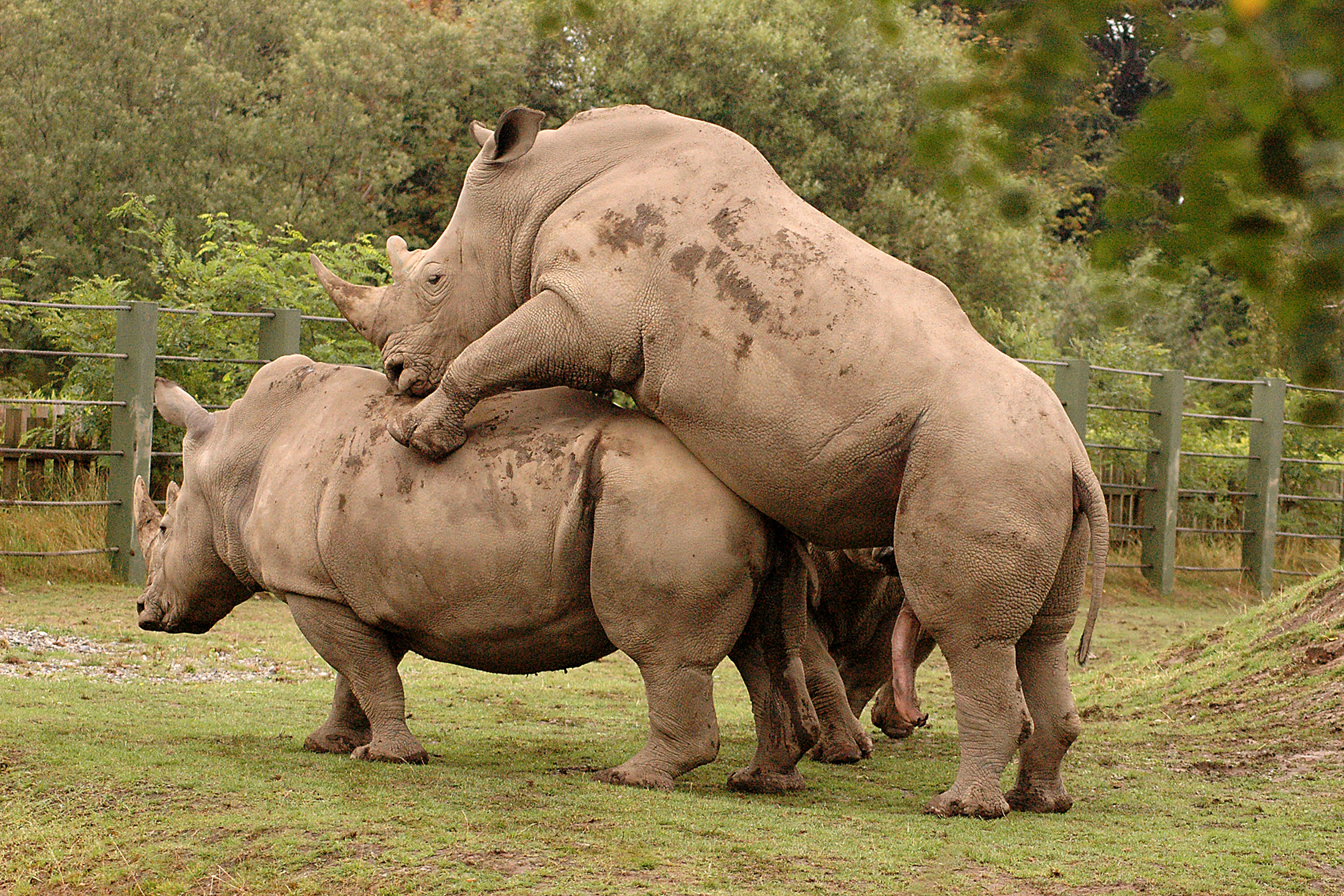
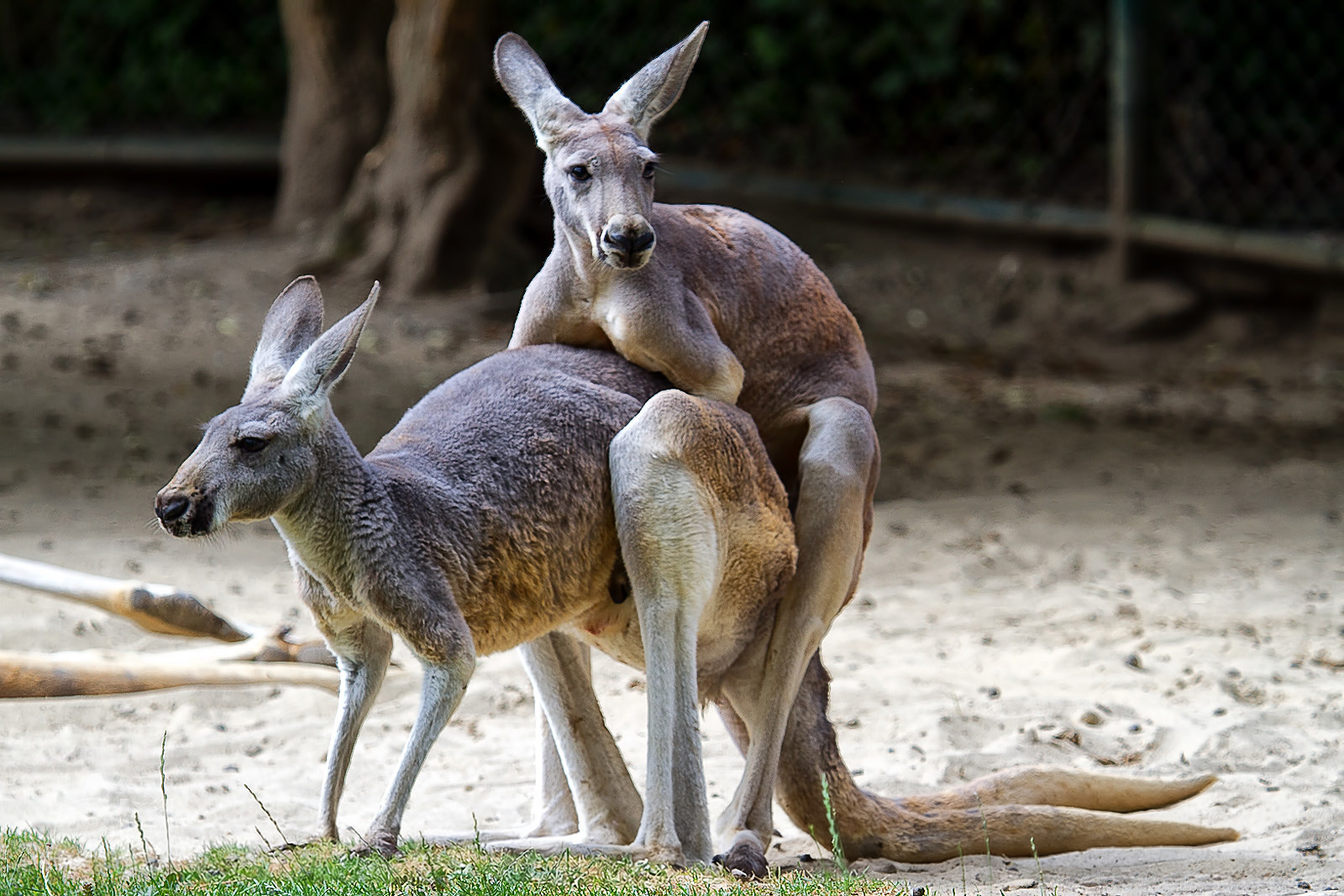
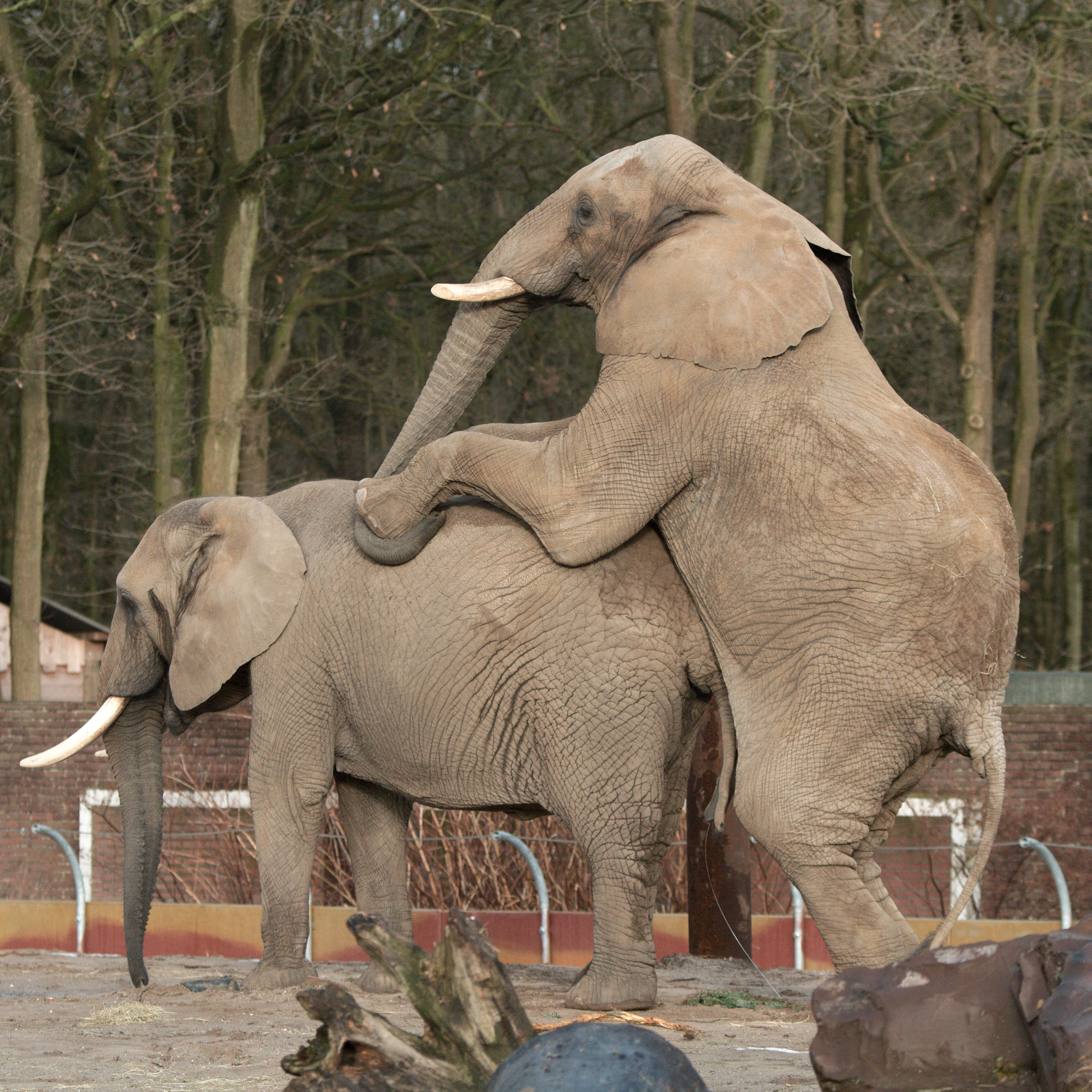
Mating postures of mammals

Sexual behavior can be classified into behavioral states associated with reward motivation ("wanting"), reward consummation also known as pleasure ("liking"), and satiety ("inhibition"); these behavioral states are regulated in mammals by reward-based sexual learning, fluctuations in various neurochemicals (i.e., dopamine − sexual desire also known as "wanting"; norepinephrine − sexual arousal; oxytocin and melanocortins − sexual attraction), and gonadal hormone cycles and further influenced by sex pheromones and motor reflexes (i.e., lordosis behavior) in some mammals.

These behavioral states correlate with the phases of the human sexual response cycle: motivation − excitement; consummation − plateau and orgasm; satiety − refraction. Sexual learning (a form of associative learning) occurs when an animal starts to associate bodily features, personality, contextual cues, and other stimuli with genitally-induced sexual pleasure. Once formed, these associations in turn impinge upon both sexual wanting and sexual liking.

In most female mammals, the act of copulation is controlled by several innate neurobiological processes, including the motor sexual reflex of lordosis. In males, the act of copulation is more complex, because some learning is necessary, but the innate processes (retrocontrol of penis intromission in the vagina, rhythmic movement of the pelvis, detection of female pheromones) are specific to copulation. These innate processes direct heterosexual copulation. Female lordosis behavior became secondary in Hominidae and is non-functional in humans. Mammals usually copulate in a dorso-ventral posture, although some primate species copulate in a ventro-vental posture.

The duration of copulation varies significantly between mammal species, and may be correlated with body mass, lasting longer in large mammals than in small mammals. The duration of copulation may also be correlated with the length of the baculum in mammals.

Male mammals ejaculate semen through the penis into the female reproductive tract during copulation. Ejaculation usually occurs after only one intromission in humans, canids, and ungulates, but occurs after multiple intromissions in most mammal species.

Copulation can induce ovulation in mammal species that do not ovulate spontaneously.

== Gallery ==
Copulating brown bears

Copulating lions

Copulating grey kangaroos

Copulating Aldabra giant tortoises

Copulating Magellanic penguins

== See also ==
- Pelvic thrust

== Bibliography ==
- Peter J Chenoweth; Steven Lorton (April 30, 2014). Animal Andrology: Theories and Applications. CABI. ISBN 978-1-78064-316-8.
- MøLler, A. P.; Birkhead, T. R. (1989). "Copulation behaviour in mammals: evidence that sperm competition is widespread" (PDF). Biological Journal of the Linnean Society. 38 (2): 119–131. doi:10.1111/j.1095-8312.1989.tb01569.x.
- Møller, A.P.; Atkin, L.; Birkhead, T.R. (1987). "Copulation Behaviour of Birds". Behaviour. 101 (1–3). Walter de Gruyter GmbH: 101–138. doi:10.1163/156853987x00396. ISSN 0005-7959.
- Richard Sadleir (December 2, 2012). The Reproduction of Vertebrates. Elsevier Science. ISBN 978-0-323-15935-7.
- Broom, D.M.; Fraser, A.F. (2015). Domestic Animal Behaviou... CABI. pp. 155–. ISBN 978-1-78064-053-2.
- P. Bateson (June 29, 2013). Perspectives in Ethology. Springer Science & Business Media. pp. 12–. ISBN 978-1-4615-7572-6.
- Roger L. Gentry (July 14, 2014). Behavior and Ecology of the Northern Fur Seal. Princeton University Press. pp. 172–. ISBN 978-1-4008-6472-0.
- Richard Estes (1991). The Behavior Guide to African Mammals: Including Hoofed Mammals, Carnivores, Primates. University of California Press. ISBN 978-0-520-08085-0.
- Carlson, Debra A. (2008). Reproductive biology of the coyote (Canis latrans): integration of behavior and physiology (PDF) (Thesis). Utah State University.
- Castro, Ana Mafalda Lopes Sardica Velez. (2016). Mexican gray wolf courtship and mating: behavior & basic endocrinology during breeding season (PDF) (Thesis). Universidade de Lisboa. Faculdade de Medicina Veterinária.
- Szykman, Micaela; Van Horn, Russell; Engh, Anne; Boydston, Erin; Holekamp, Kay (2007). "Courtship and mating in free-living spotted hyenas" (PDF). Behaviour. 144 (7). Walter de Gruyter GmbH: 815–846. Bibcode:2007Behav.144..815S. doi:10.1163/156853907781476418. ISSN 0005-7959.
- Dixson, A. F. (1987). "Baculum length and copulatory behavior in primates". American Journal of Primatology. 13 (1): 51–60. doi:10.1002/ajp.1350130107. ISSN 0275-2565. PMID 31973483.
