= Grey kangaroo =

Grey kangaroo is a kangaroo that is grey. Species include:

- Eastern grey kangaroo (Macropus giganteus)
- Western grey kangaroo (Macropus fuliginosus)
