= Kalmithaus =

Mountain in Germany

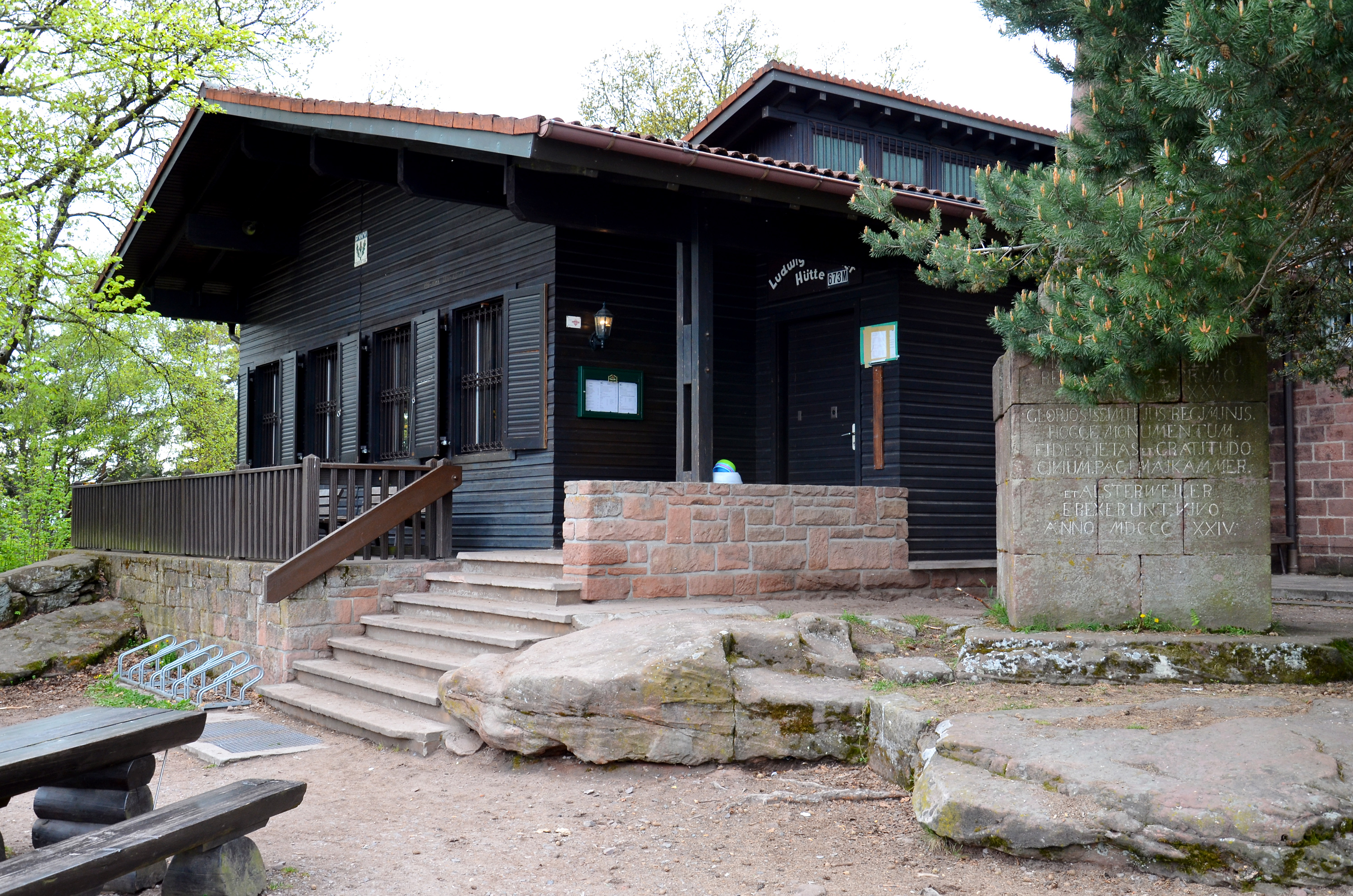
- The Kalmithaus from the east
- Interactive map of the Kalmithaus area

General information
- Location: Kalmit in the Haardt
- Elevation: 672.6 m (2,207 ft)
- Owner: Palatinate Forest Club

Website
- www.kalmithaus.de

The Kalmithaus, also called the Ludwigshafener Hut, near Maikammer in the Rhineland-Palatinate county of Südliche Weinstraße is a refuge hut in the Palatinate Forest run by the Ludwigshafen-Mannheim branch of the Palatinate Forest Club. It is located in the southern part of the Haardt mountains at the summit of its highest peak, the Kalmit (672.6 m above sea level (NHN)), and is thus the highest hut in the Palatinate Forest. From its terrace there is "a splendid view of the Upper Rhine Plain and German Wine Road as far as the foothills of the southern Odenwald and northern Black Forest. Immediately next to the hut is the observation tower on the Kalmit, which is out of bounds to the public, and houses a radio relay station, a weather station and a visibility survey station.

== History ==
A commemorative board below the Kalmithaus refers to a refuge hut built in 1882 by the Palatinate Conservation Club. The first hut managed by the Ludwigshafen branch of the Palatinate Forest Club was inaugurated in 1908. After the Second World War the Kalmit and its refuge hut were occupied by French troops. After lengthy negotiations the hut was handed back on 11 October 1953 and opened again in 1955. Following the receipt of a large sum of money from the War Damages Office, supplemented by donations, a brand new hut was opened in 1957. On 13 November 1981 the front part of the hut was completely destroyed by a gas explosion. After it was rebuilt the present Kalmithaus was inaugurated on 12 June 1983.

== Access and walking ==
The Kalmithaus can only be reached on the forest tracks of the Kalmit; although there is hiker's car park known as the Kalmit on the Kalmithöhenstraße (ca. 645 m) only about 250 metres northwest of the summit. One route to the top runs from Alsterweiler (211 m; in the municipality of Maikammer) through the valley between the Wetterkreuzberg (400.7 m) and Breitenberg (545.2 m). Other routes include the one from Sankt Martin (235 m) through the Altbach and Wolsel valley, from Maikammer through the Klausental and from Neustadt an der Weinstraße (130 m) through the Kaltenbrunnen valley. Other walks run from Hüttenhohl (476.9 m) on the Totenkopfstraße via the Hüttenberg (620.1 m) and the Felsenmeer Hüttenberg or from Hambach Castle (379.2 m) via the Sommerberg (501.9 m), the Hohe Loog Plateau (582.5 m) and the Zwergberg (589.3 m). The neighbouring Palatinate Forest Club huts are the Haus an den Fichten, the Totenkopf Hut, the Klausental Hut and the Hohe Loog Haus.

== Gallery ==
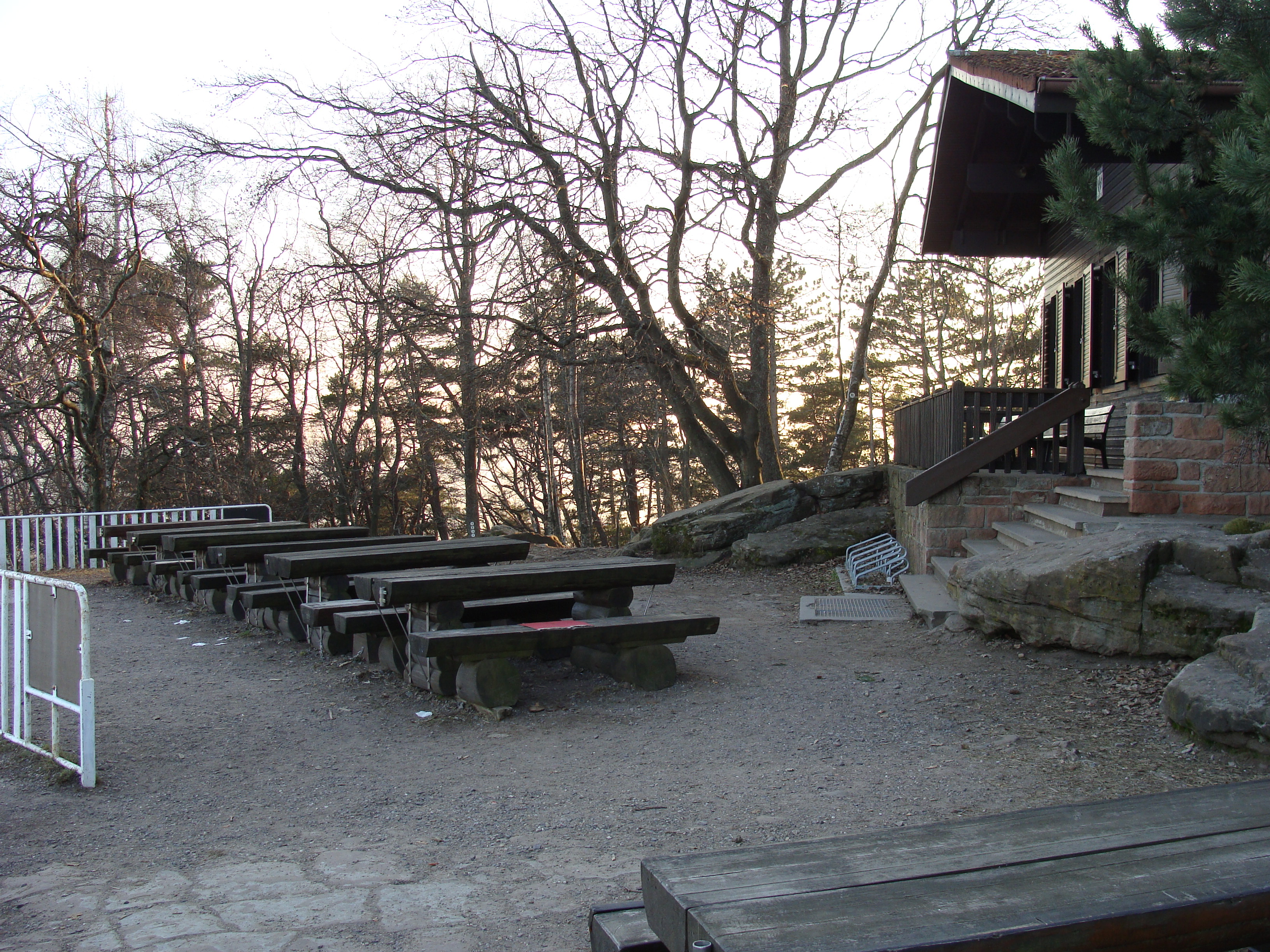
The Kalmithaus

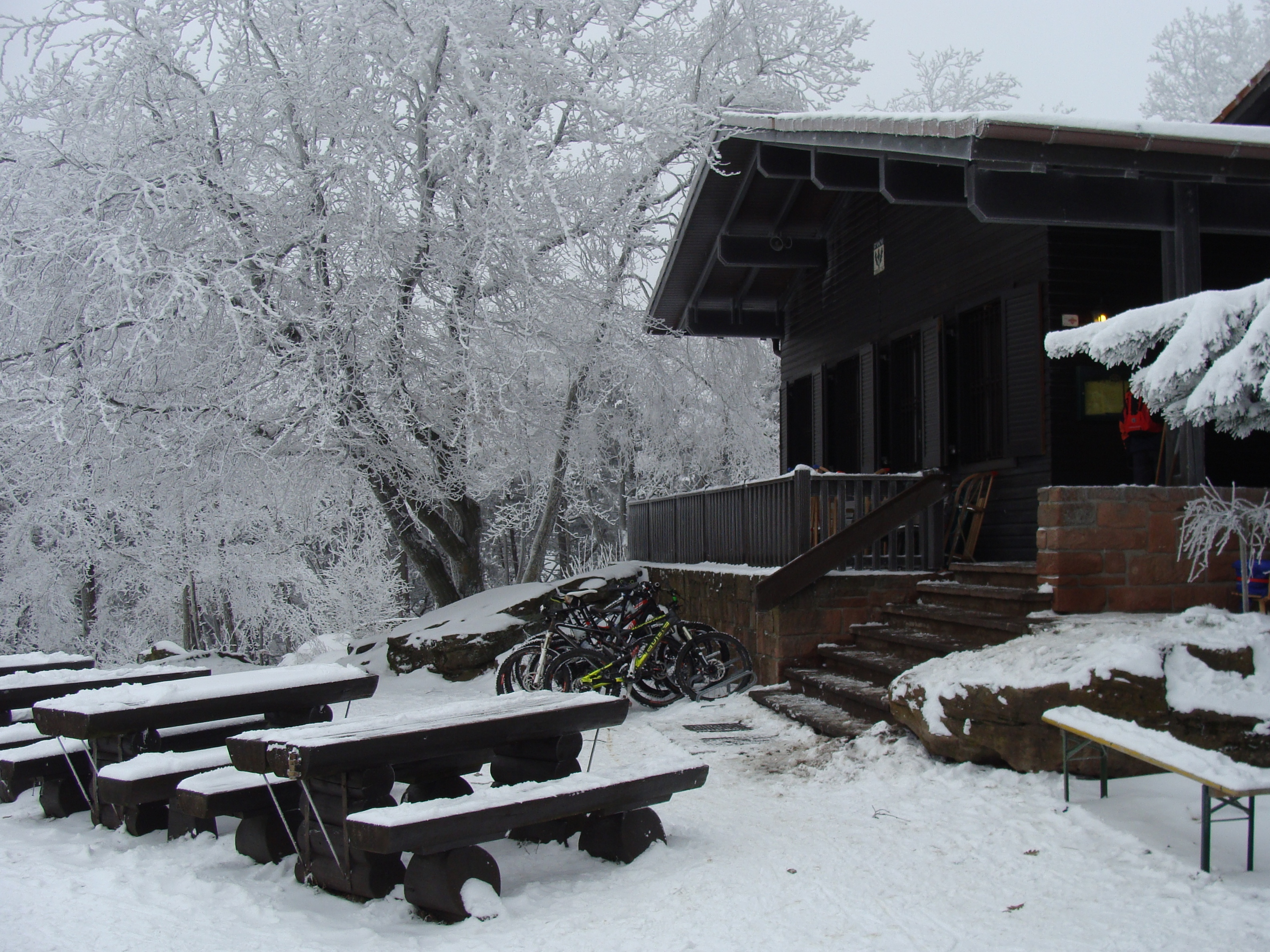
The Kalmithaus in winter

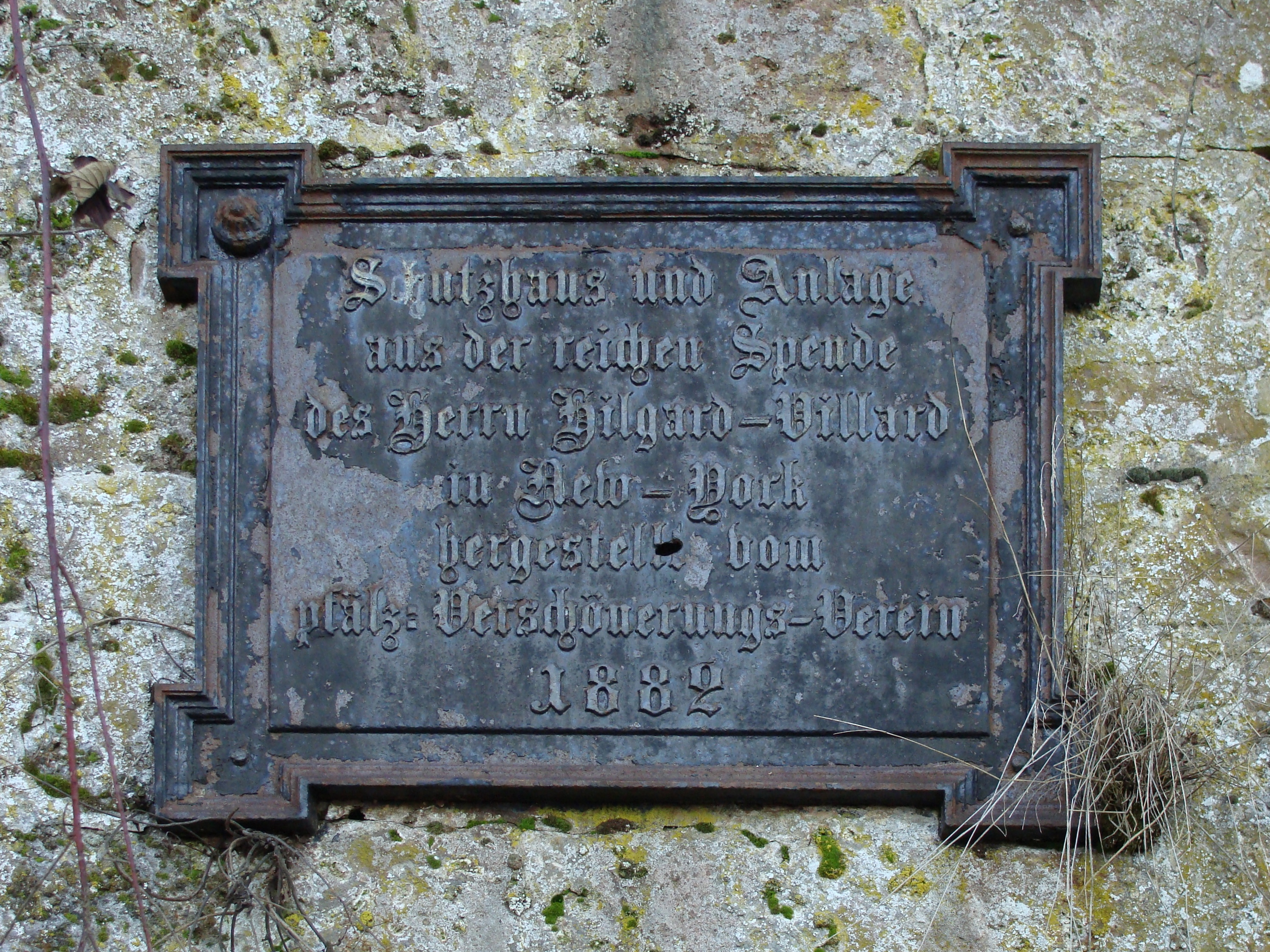
1882 information board below the Kalmithaus

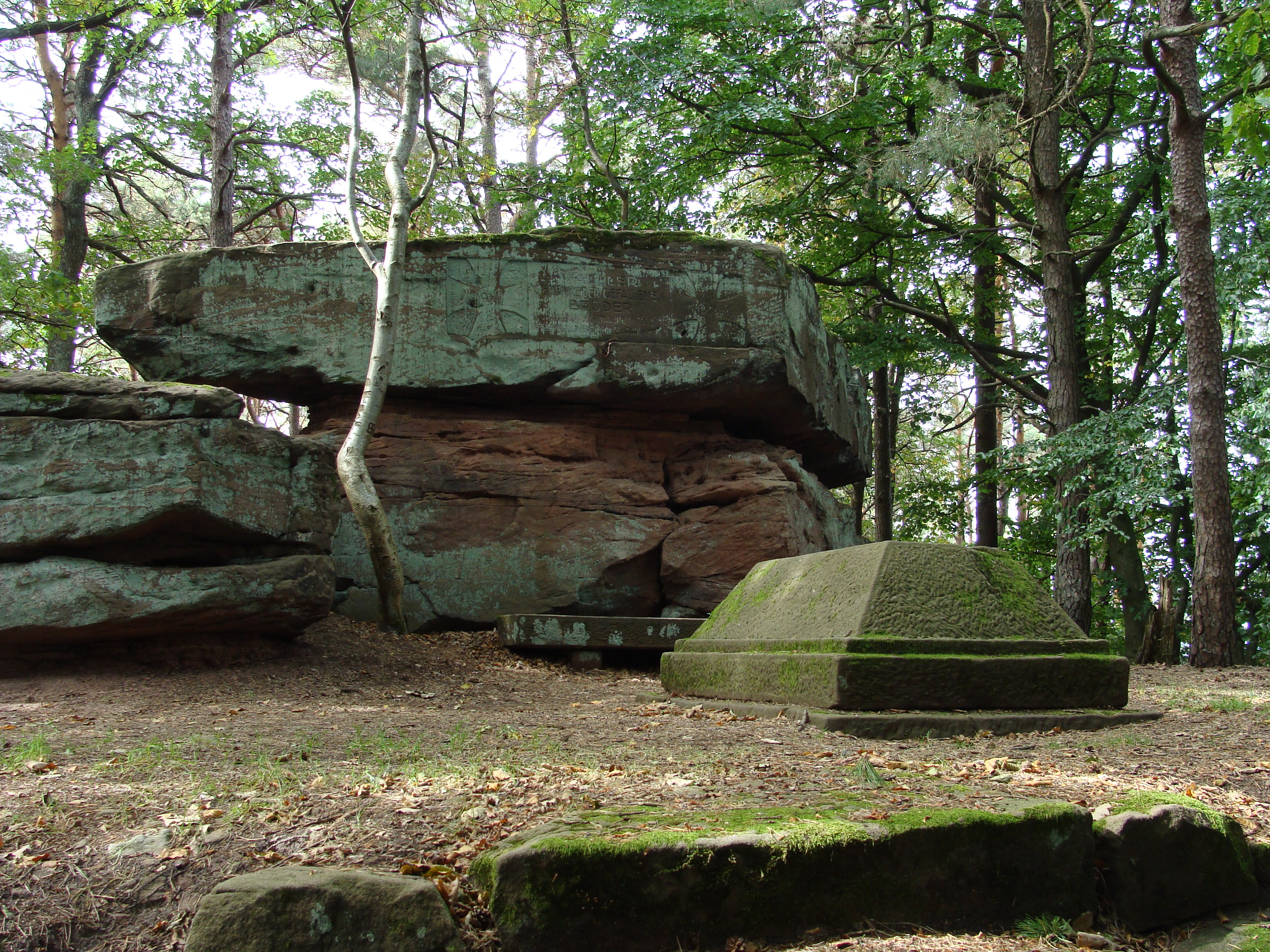
War memorial for the Palatinate Forest Club's Edenkoben branch at the summit of the Kalmit

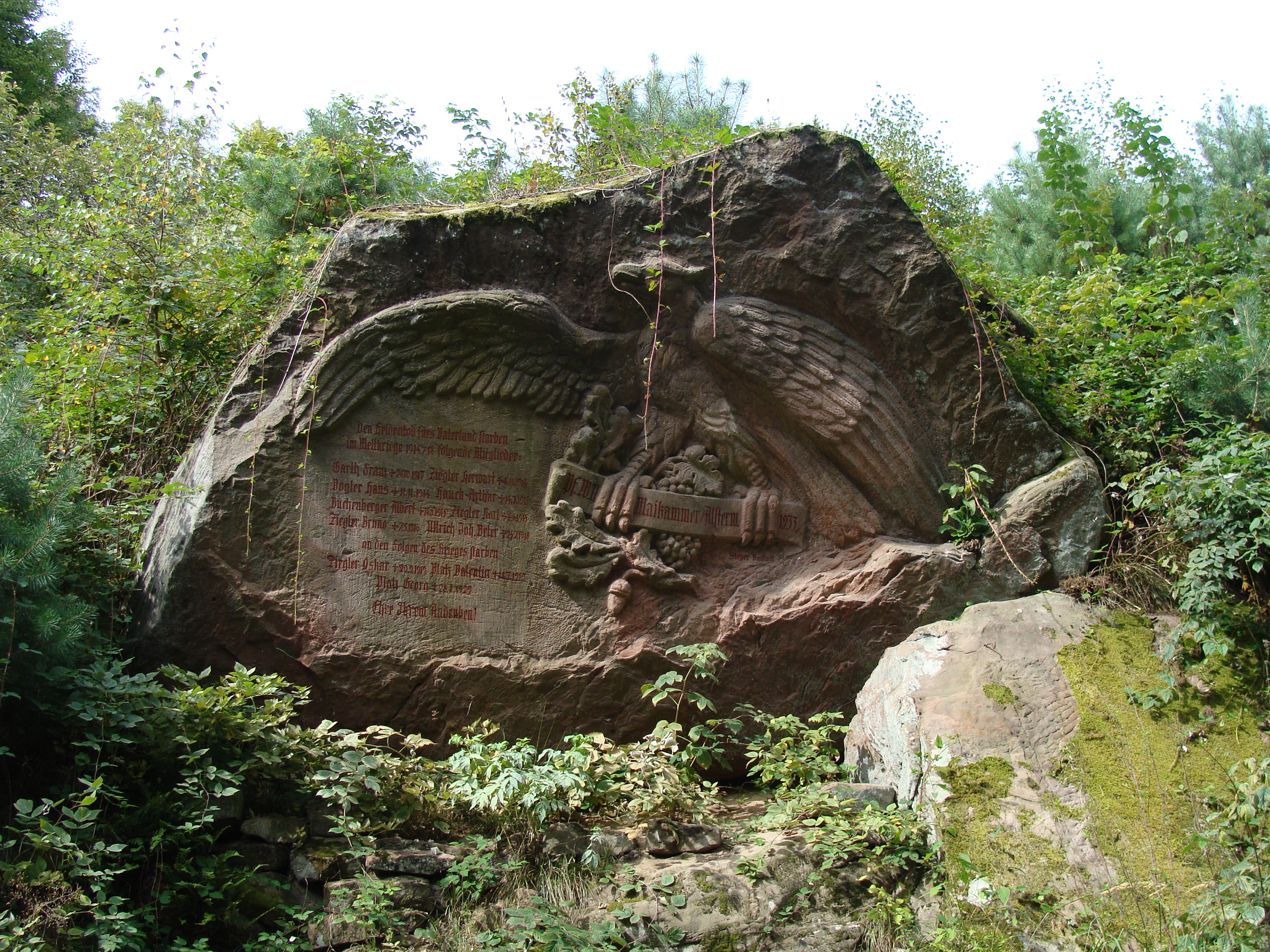
War memorial for the Palatinate Forest Club's Maikammer branch at the summit of the Kalmit

== Literature ==
- Matthias Wittber: Pfälzerwald mit Bienwald. Bruckmann Verlag, 2009, ISBN 978-3-7654-4287-2.
- Pietruska-Wanderkarte: Edenkoben – Die Urlaubsregion zwischen Landau und Neustadt. 1:25,000. Pietruska Verlag, Rülzheim, 2007, ISBN 978-3-934895-56-0.
- Pietruska-Wanderkarte: Hauenstein & Trifelsland. 1:25,000. Pietruska Verlag, Rülzheim, 2006, ISBN 3-934895-44-1.
