= Hüttenhohl =

Mountain pass in Germany

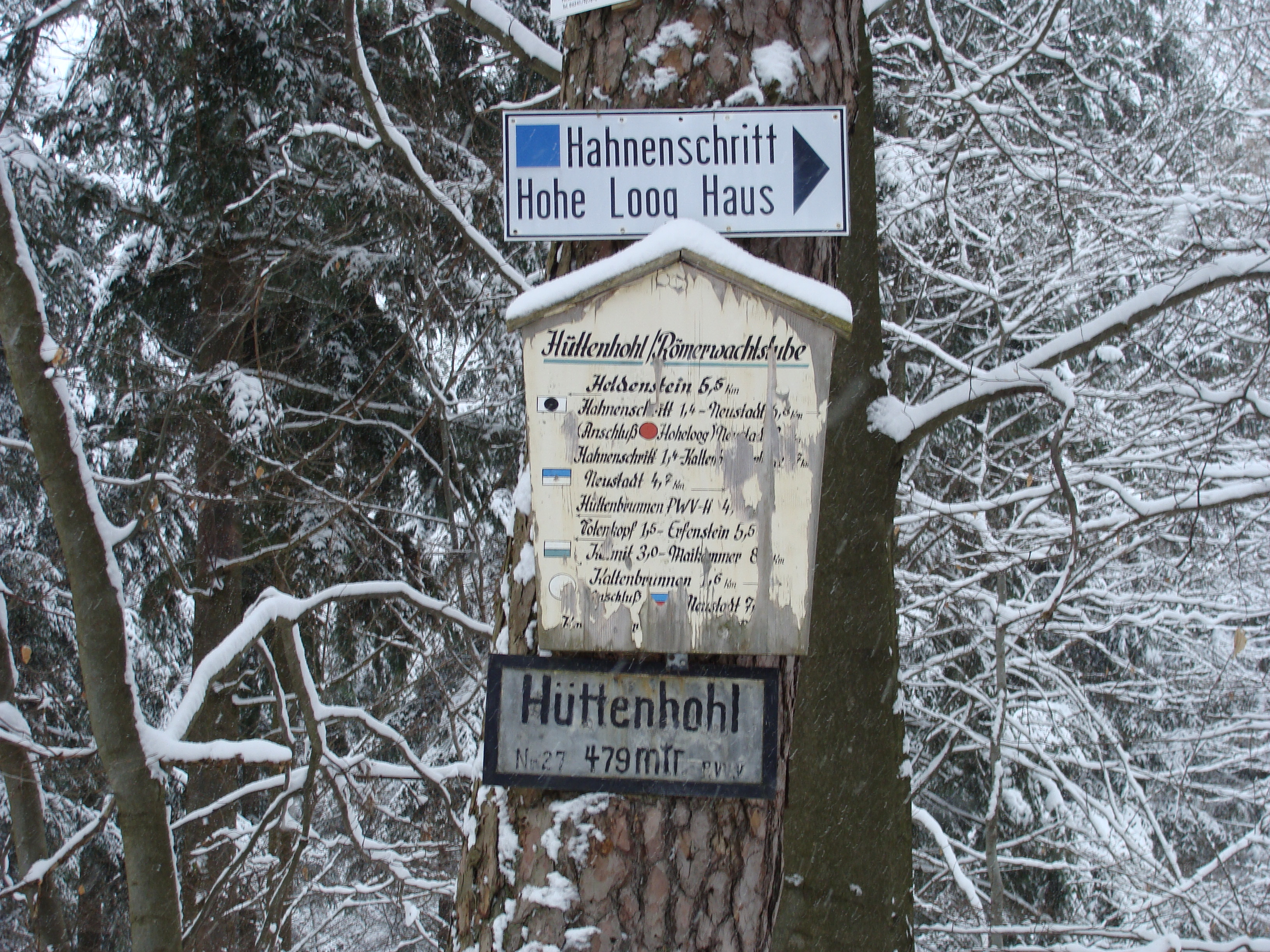
- Signs at the Hüttenhohl
- Interactive map of Hüttenhohl
- Elevation: 479DE-NHN
- Traversed by: Totenkopfstraße (L 514) and Kalmithöhenstraße (L 515)

Third Approach
- Range: Palatinate Forest
- Coordinates: 49°19′05″N 8°03′56″E

The Hüttenhohl is a mountain pass in the Haardt mountains in the German state of Rhineland-Palatinate on the boundary of the parishes of Maikammer and Neustadt an der Weinstraße. Here, at 476.9 m above sea level (NHN), the Kalmithöhenstraße (Landesstraße 515) branches off the Totenkopfstraße (L 514). By the fork there is a sign on a tree with the height recorded as "479 mtr".

The term "pass" here does not refer to the roads that meet here because they continue to climb from the Sankt Martin valley towards the Totenkopf and Kalmit, but to the saddle between the Sankt Martin valley and the Finstertal valley.

== Location ==
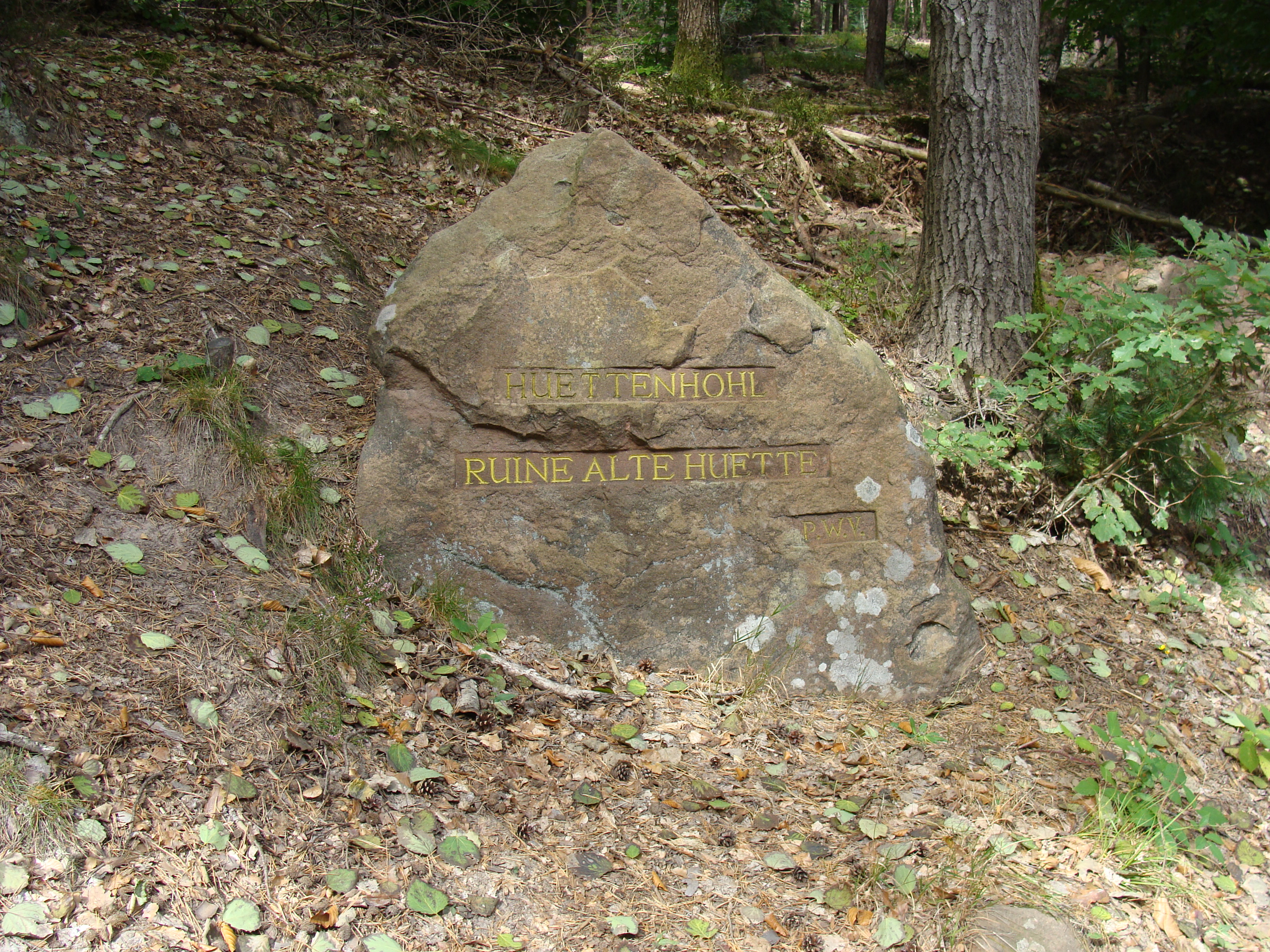
Ritterstein No. 239: Huettenhohl – Ruine Alte Huette

The Hüttenhohl lies within the Palatinate Forest-North Vosges Biosphere Reserve and the Palatinate Forest Nature Park. It forms the saddle between the Kalmit (672.6 m) to the east, and its subpeak, the Hüttenberg (620.1 m) to the southeast and the Rotsohlberg (607.1 m) to the west and the Schafkopf (616.8 m) to the southwest. The pass enables a crossing from the Sankt Martin valley to the south to the Finstertal valley to the north.
