= Schafkopf (Haardt) =

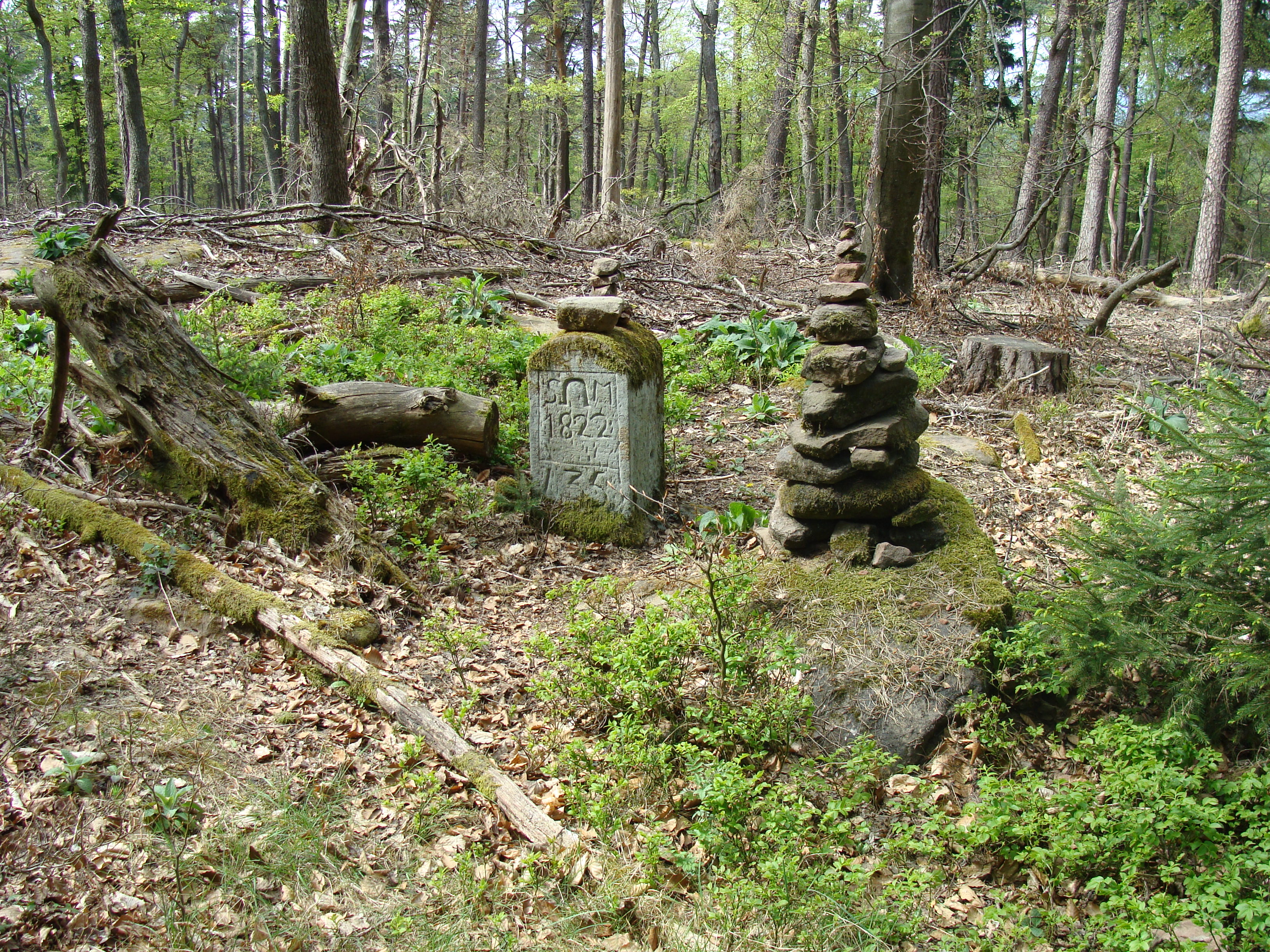
- The summit of the Schafkopf

Highest point
- Elevation: 616.8 m above sea level (NN) (2,024 ft)
- Coordinates: 49°18′47″N 8°02′58″E

Geography
- Location within Rhineland-Palatinate
- Location: Rhineland-Palatinate, Germany
- Parent range: Haardt (Palatinate), Palatine Forest

The Schafkopf, with its height of 616.8 metres, is one of the few mountains of the Palatine Forest that exceeds the 600 metre mark. It lies south of the Forest's highest peak, the Kalmit, in the Palatine Forest-North Vosges Biosphere Reserve, not far from the municipality of St. Martin and, together with the Morschenberg (608 m), Rotsohlberg (607 m) and Steigerkopf (614 m), forms a contiguous massif. The Schafkopf is entirely forested. There are no official paths or tracks to the actual summit.
