= Hüttenberg (Haardt) =

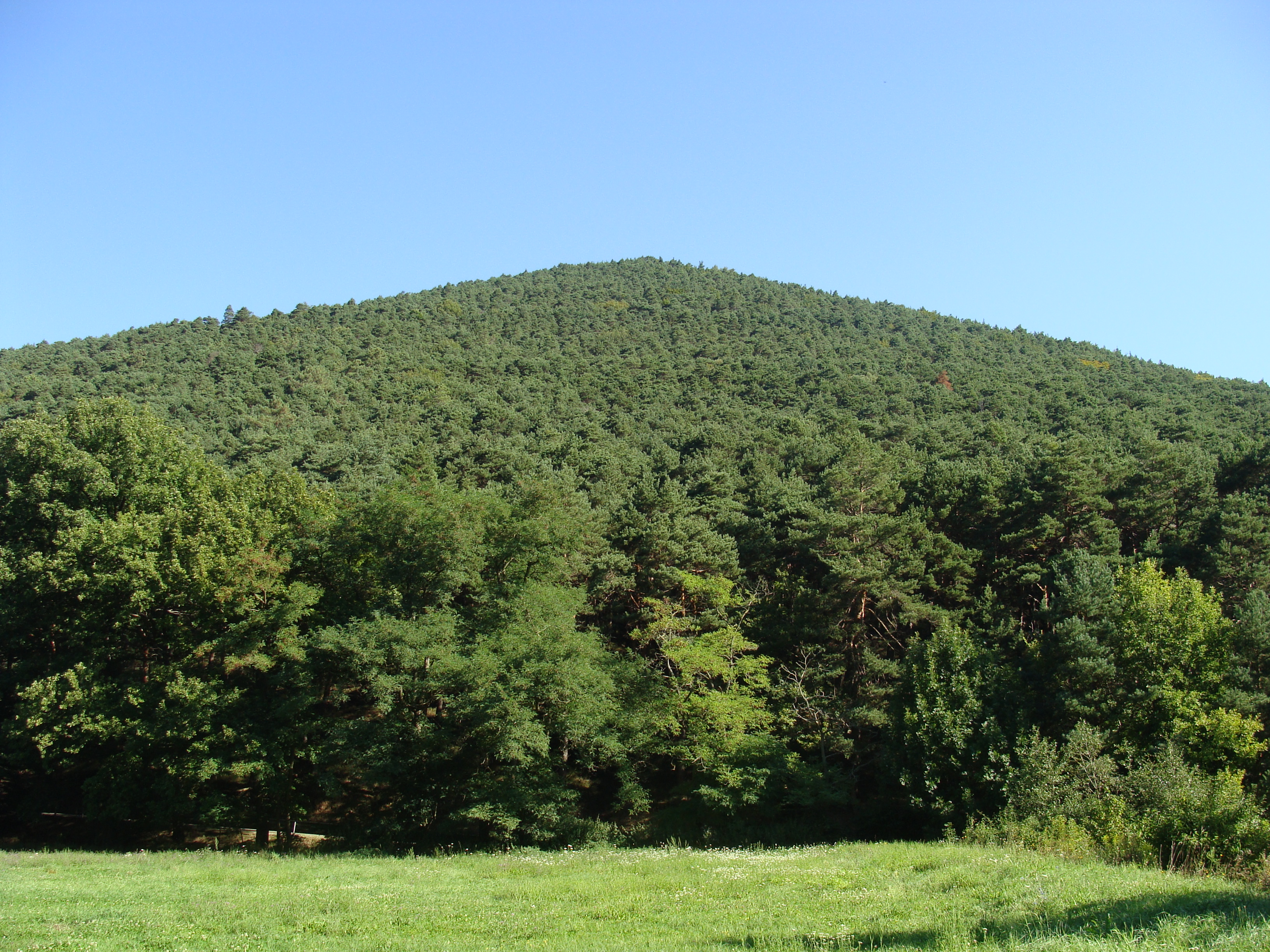
- The Hüttenberg seen from the Sankt Martin valley

Highest point
- Elevation: 620.1 m above sea level (NN) (2,034 ft)
- Coordinates: 49°19′56″N 8°04′14″E

Geography
- Location within Rhineland-Palatinate
- Location: near Maikammer; Südliche Weinstraße, Rhineland-Palatinate (Germany)
- Parent range: Haardt → Palatinate Forest

Geology
- Rock age: 251–243 million years ago
- Mountain type: mountain ridge
- Rock type: Middle bunter sandstone: Karlstal rock zone

The Hüttenberg (German pronunciation: [ˈhʏtn̩bɛʁk]) near Maikammer in the Rhineland-Palatinate county of Südliche Weinstraße is a subpeak, 620.1 m above sea level (NN), of the Kalmit (672.6 m) the highest mountain in the Haardt in the eastern Palatinate Forest of Germany. There is a blockfield, the Hüttenberg Felsenmeer, along the crest.

== Geography ==
=== Location ===
The Hüttenberg lies in the Palatinate Forest-North Vosges Biosphere Reserve and the Palatinate Forest Nature Park. Like the Breitenberg (545.2 m), the Taubenkopf (603.8 m), the Kanzel (531.7 m) and the Wetterkreuzberg (400.7 m), it is one of the subpeaks of the Kalmit (672.6 m), the Palatinate Forest's highest summit. It is covered by woodland and is about 950 metres as the crow flies southwest of the main summit, with which it is linked via a gently sloping saddle, and west-northwest of the top of the Breitenberg. Its northern part, including the summit, is in the parish of Maikammer, the southern part belongs to Sankt Martin.

== Hüttenberg Felsenmeer ==
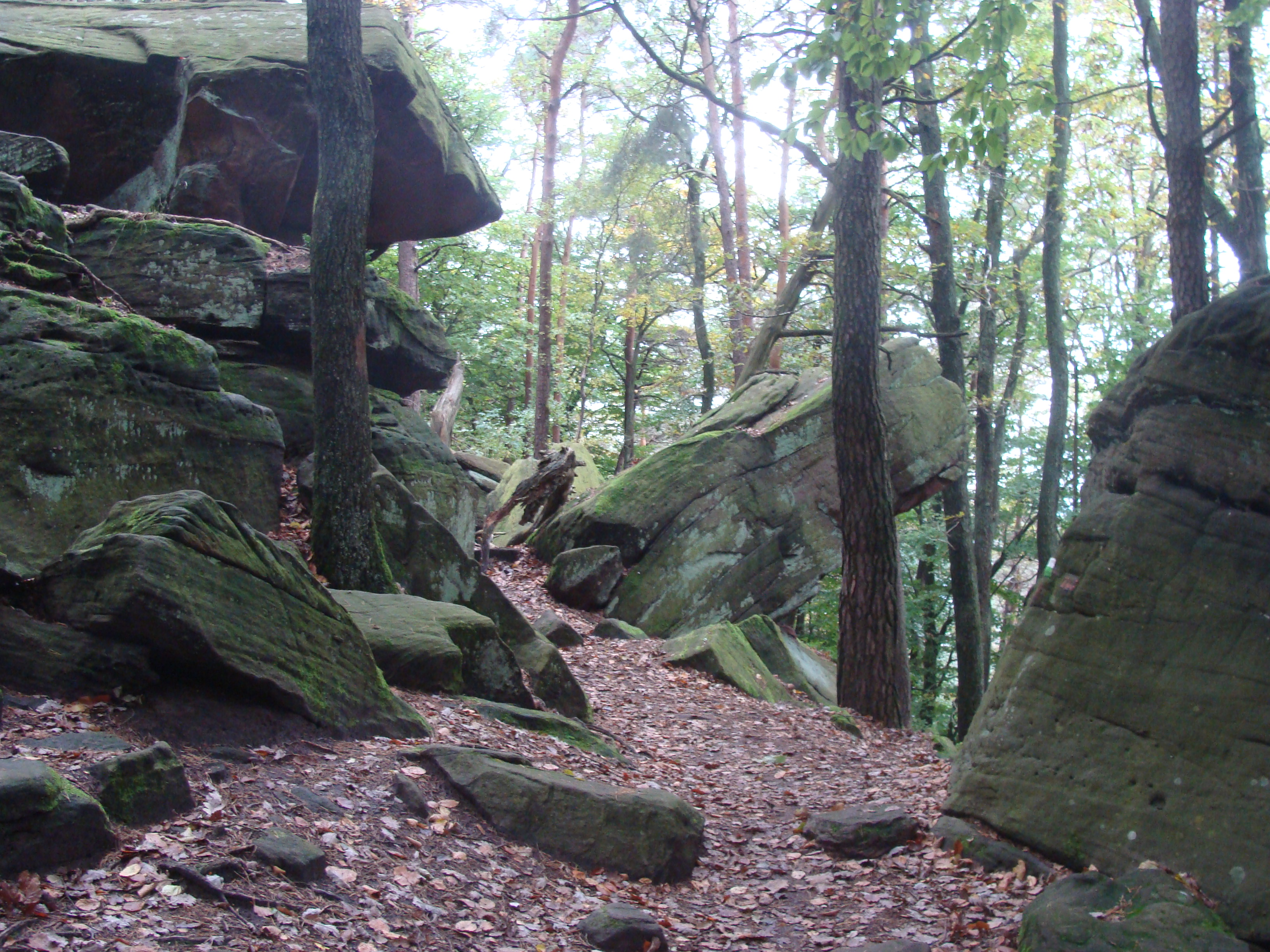
Hüttenberg Felsenmeer

The Hüttenberg Felsenmeer is a blockfield on the Hüttenberg ridge and a feature of the geology of the Palatinate Forest. The sandstone blockfield is made up of boulders of the Middle Bunter, particularly the Karlstal Rock Zone, which were formed during the Triassic period. These range from boulders strewn over the surface of the mountainside to rock formations up to 10 metres high. The boulders were formed during the various ice ages, frost weathering of the hitherto solid layers of rock splitting it into a sea of boulders. These rocks are not only found on the summit ridge, which runs roughly from north to south and is around 700 metres long, but also on the mountainsides because, during the short periods of thawing in the summer months, the piles of rubble, soaked in meltwaters, are set in motion and slide downhill. The Felsenmeer is a popular bouldering area.

== Transport and walking ==
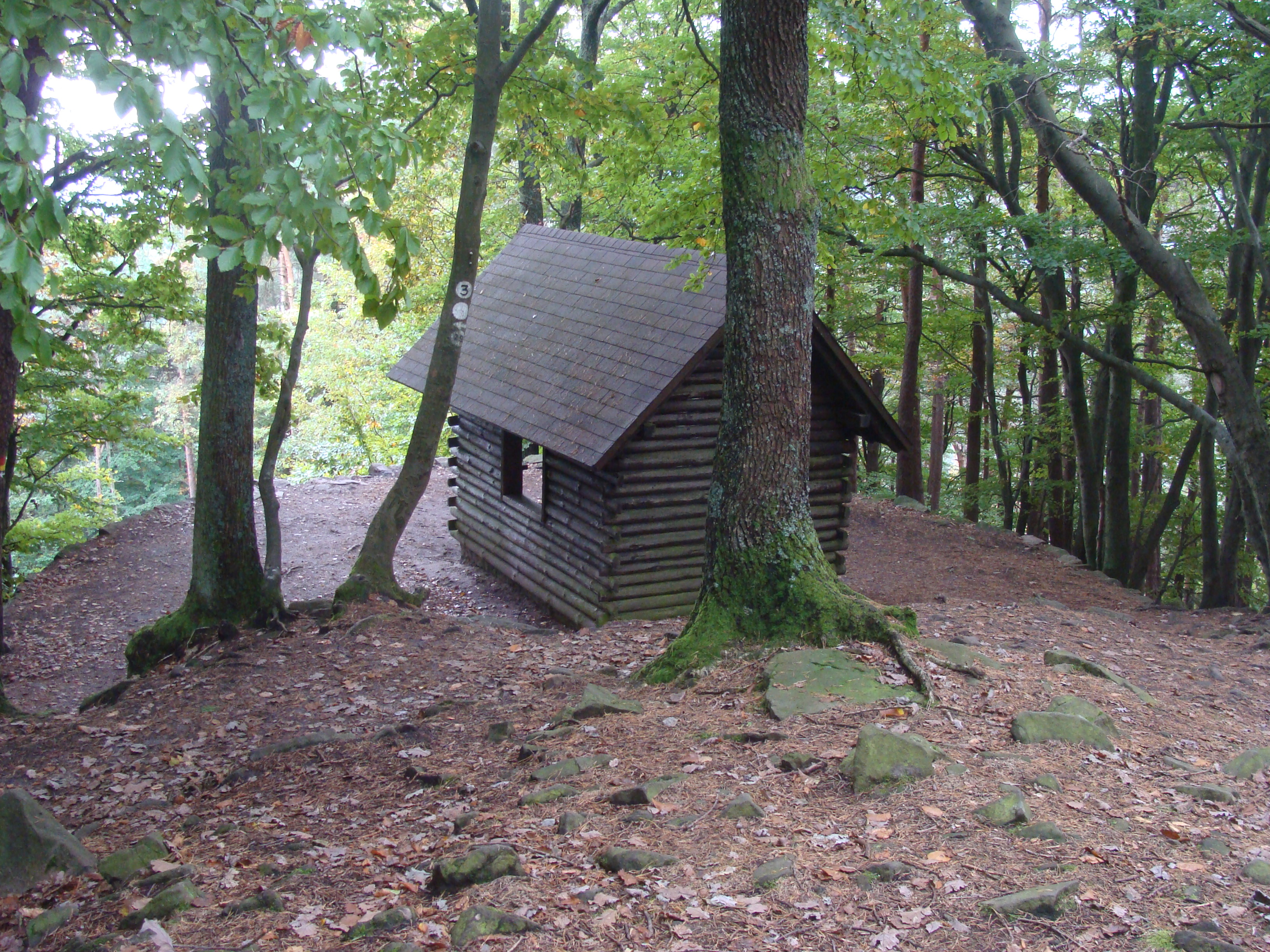
The Hüttenberg Hut

The Landesstraße 514 (Totenkopfstraße), runs along the southern and western sides of the Hüttenberg from Sankt Martin via the Hüttenhohl (479 m) and over the Totenkopf saddle (513.7 m) to Breitenstein. The L 515 (Kalmithöhenstraße) branches off northwest from this road below the summit of the Hüttenberg near the Hüttenhohl at 476.9 m heading over the Kalmit heights to Maikammer.

The shortest route to the Hüttenberg is from the car park near the Kalmit which is about a 15-minute walk. Other routes are from the Sankt Martin valley from the ramblers' car park by the managed refuge hut, Haus an den Fichten, through the Wolseltal valley or from the car park at the Hüttenhohl. Two trails run over the summit ridge – on directly over and through the Hüttenberg Felsenmeer; the other running alongside the blockfield to the east and just below it. The start and end point is the saddle with the Kalmit and the refuge hut at the southern end of the ridge called the Hüttenberg Hut (Hüttenberghütte, 591.2 m), from where there is a view of the Sankt Martin valley. The Palatine Wine Route, opened in autumn 2010 and certified as a Prädikatsweg in 2011 by the German Alpine and Rambling Club Association, also crosses the felsenmeer as part of the 4th stage and finally reaches the long descent to the wine-growing village of Sankt Martin.
