= Palatinate Forest-North Vosges Biosphere Reserve =

Coordinates: 49.06°N 7.64°E

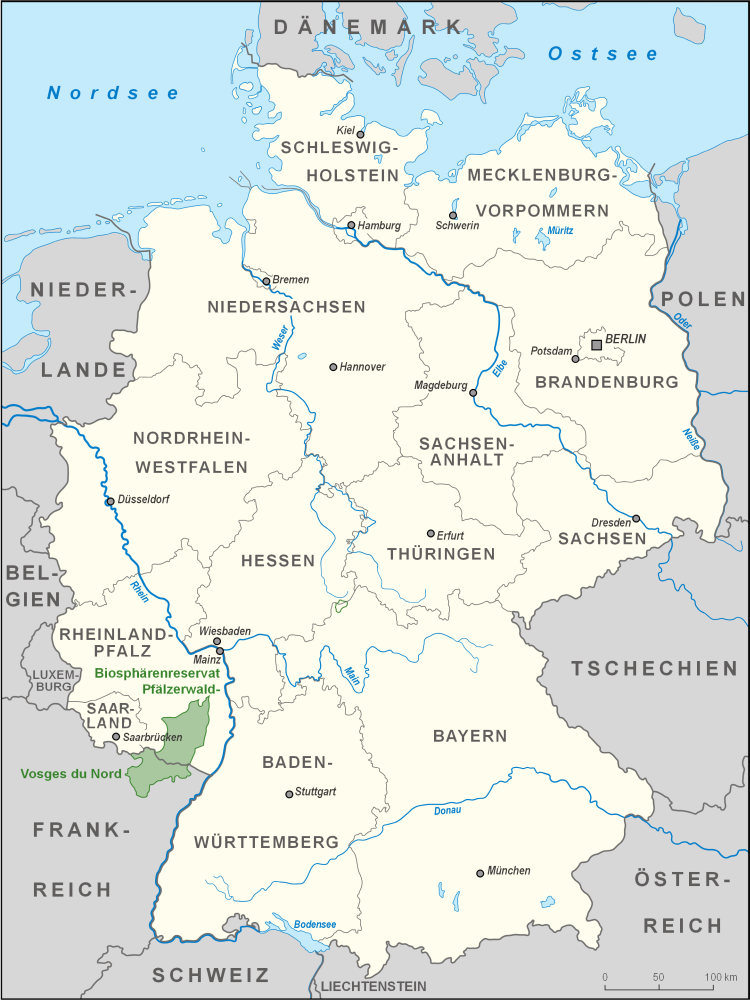
Location of the biosphere reserve in Germany and France.

The Franco-German Palatinate Forest-North Vosges Biosphere Reserve (German: Biosphärenreservat Pfälzerwald-Nordvogesen, French: Réserve de biosphère transfrontalière des Vosges du Nord-Forêt palatine) was created in 1998 as the first UNESCO trans-boundary biosphere reserve in Europe. The German part became the 12th of 16 biosphere reserves in Germany, and the French part, the 6th of 14 in France.

== Description ==
The biosphere reserve is a fusion of the older Palatinate Forest Nature Park in Germany and Northern Vosges Regional Nature Park in France, covering a total area of 3018 km^{2}, with 1785 km^{2} in Germany and 1277 km^{2} in France respectively.

== Demographics ==
The population is around 335 175, with 253 390 living in the German part of the Reserve, compared with just over 81 785 on the French side in 2018. This difference in population is not reflected in the number of communes, as there are 142 on the German side versus 111 on the French side for a total of 253 communes. Average population density, at just over 76 inhabitants per square kilometer, is fairly low for a Western European region, although it is higher on the German side (89 inhabitants/km2) than on the French side (59 inhabitants/km2).

== Management ==
Management of the Reserve is a collaborative effort between the two countries, delegated to a coordinating committee made up of representatives from both countries (the Syndicat de coopération du Parc naturel régional des Vosges du Nord, on the French side, and the Biosphärenreservat Pfälzerwald-Nordvogesen, on the German side), chaired alternately every two years by a French or German elected official.

== Geography ==
Most of the Reserve's territory is occupied by vast forests, covering almost the entire Vosges-Pfalz mountain range. Forests alone account for almost 74% of the Reserve's surface area. In contrast to this natural preponderance, the urbanized portion of the Reserve's territory is only 5%.

This geographical entity, which constitutes the largest forest area in Western Europe, remains the least populated.

=== Location ===
The biosphere reserve lies in the Palatinate Forest and in the North Vosges on the boundary between the southwest German state of Rhineland-Palatinate and the northeast French region of Grand Est.

== Gallery ==
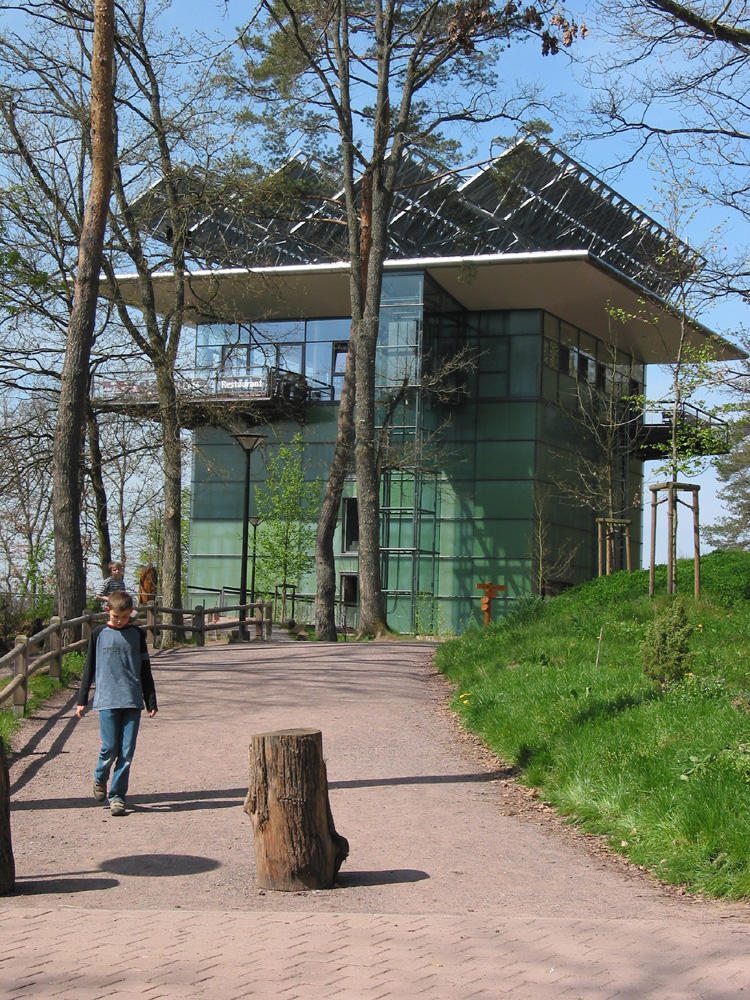
Biosphere house in Fischbach near Dahn

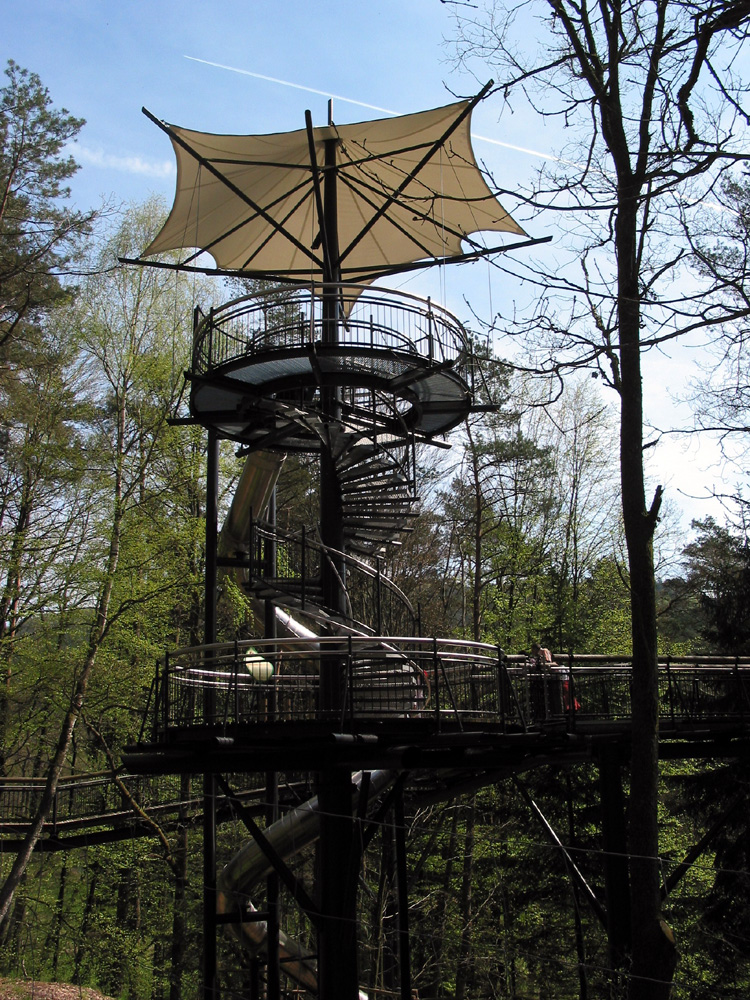
Platforms on the Baumwipfel Path

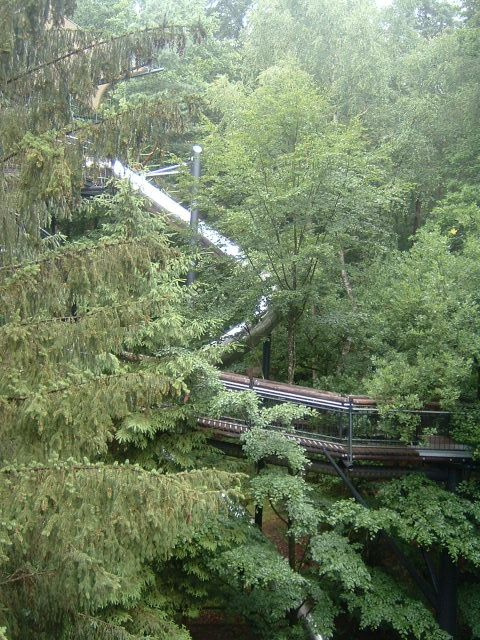
View from the Baumwipfel Path looking down

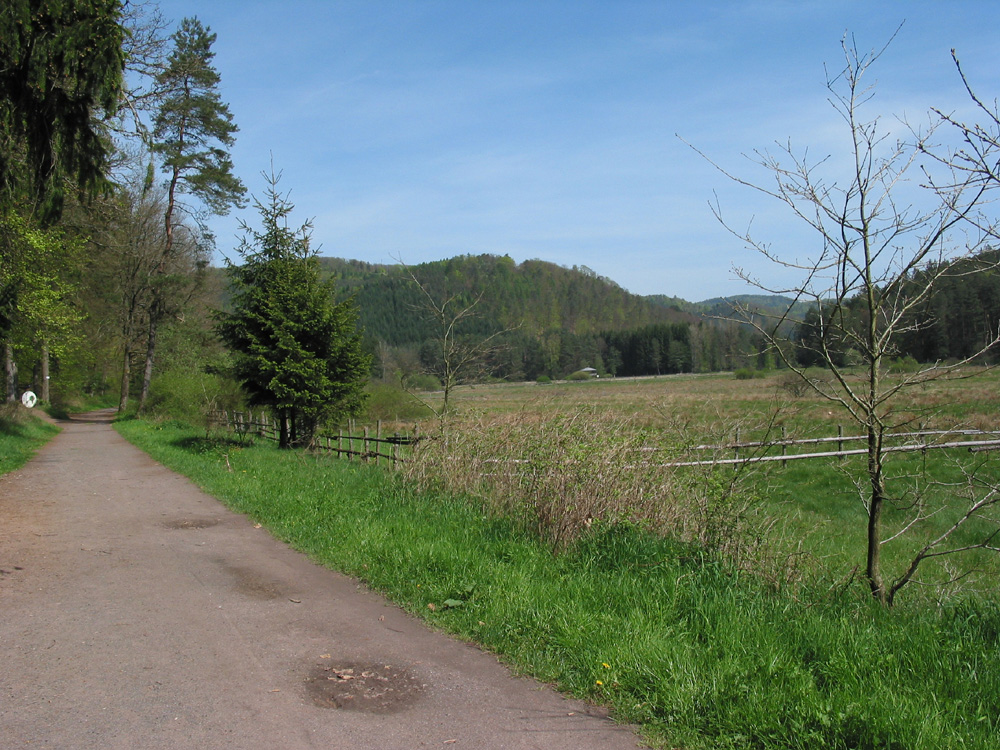
Biosphere experience path in Fischbach

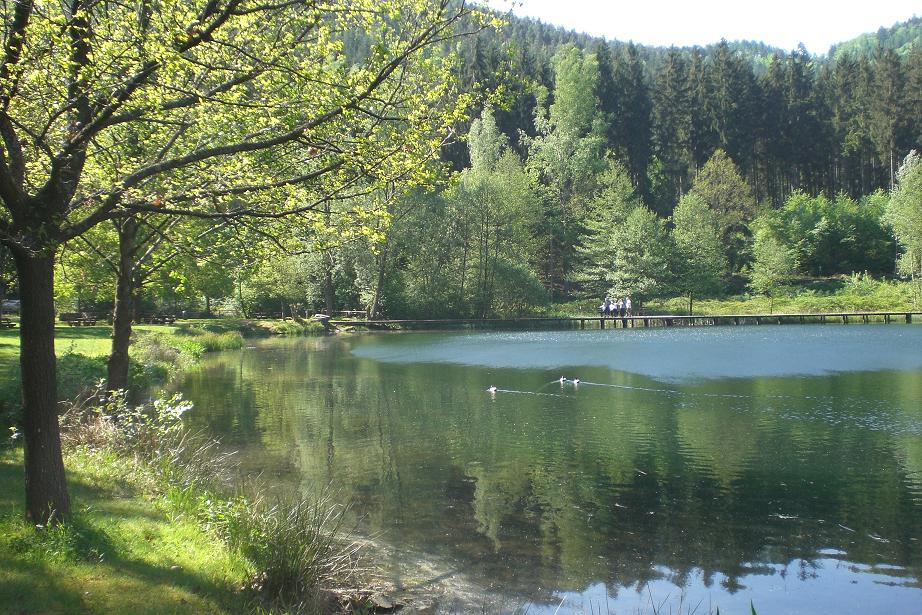
Helmbachweiher lake

== See also ==
- Palatinate Forest Nature Park, German part
- Northern Vosges Regional Nature Park, French part
