= List of Royal Navy first-class cricketers =

This is a list of cricketers who played first-class matches for the Royal Navy cricket team. The team played a total of 21 first-class matches between 1912 and 1929, most frequently playing the Army team which it met 14 times in top-level matches, all of which were played at Lord's. The team played the Royal Air Force three times in first-class matches between 1927 and 1929 and also played first-class matches against Cambridge University, MCC and, in 1927, against the touring New Zealanders. Royal Navy cricket teams continue to play organised matches in the modern era, but none have held official status since 1929.

A combined Army and Navy team played three first-class matches between 1910 and 1919 and the Combined Services team played 63 first-class matches between 1920 and 1964. Players who appeared in first-class matches for those teams are not included on this list unless they also played for the Royal Navy in a first-class match.

== A ==
- Cecil Abercrombie
- William Agnew
- Cyrus Ainsworth
- Edward Aylmer

== B ==
- Frank Baker
- Arthur Barnby
- Edward Bartley
- Sydney Beadle
- Charles Benstead
- Stuart Bonham Carter
- Philip Bonham-Carter
- Sidney Boucher
- James Boyd (sportsman)
- Basil Brooke
- Cecil Brooke-Short
- Dallas Brooks

== C ==
- Alexander Cadell
- Harold Campbell
- Arthur Cantrell
- Arthur Casswell
- Maurice Conde-Williams
- Charles Congdon
- Oswald Cornwallis
- Charles Cowan
- Robert Cunliffe

== D ==
- Jack Dale
- Cyril Douglas-Pennant

== E ==
- Eric Elstob
- Alfred Evans
- Harold Evans (cricketer)
- Martin Evans (cricketer)
- Charles Evan-Thomas

== G ==
- Charles Garrett
- Galfry Gatacre
- Arthur Gibson
- Clement Glenister
- William Wellington Godfrey
- James Gornall
- William Goudge
- Norman Grace

== H ==
- Thomas Halsey
- Gerald Harrison
- Deric Holland-Martin
- Frank Horsey
- Herbert Hull
- Kenneth Hunt
- John Hussey

== I ==
- Philip Irwin

== J ==
- Thomas Jameson
- Selwyn Jephson

== K ==
- Derek Kenderdine

== L ==
- William Leach
- Charles Lewin
- George Hamilton D'Oyly Lyon

== M ==
- Michael McMaster
- High Montgomery
- John Murray

== O ==
- Hugh Orr

== P ==
- Herbert Annesley Packer
- Edwin Pain
- Manfred Palmes
- John Pelly
- Arnold Pomfret

== R ==
- Arnold Reading
- Basil Reed
- Kenneth Robinson

== S ==
- Arthur Scott
- Kenneth Sellar
- Harry Sharpe
- Robert Shaw
- Edward Sinclair
- Arthur Skey
- Charles Smith
- John Sparks
- Robert Stephenson
- Edward Neville Syfret

== T ==
- Alpin Thomson
- Frederick Trumble
- Gerald Tuck

== W ==
- Geoffrey Webb
- Arthur Wood
- Arthur Wright

== See also ==
- List of British Army first-class cricketers
- List of Combined Services (United Kingdom) cricketers
- List of Royal Air Force first-class cricketers
