= Kenderdine =

Kenderdine is a surname. Notable people with the surname include:

- Augustus Kenderdine (1870–1947), English-Canadian artist
- Derek Kenderdine (1897–1947), English cricketer and Royal Navy officer
- Leonard Kenderdine (1924-2006) Naval aviator
- Sarah Kenderdine, New Zealand museologist
- Tristan Kenderdine, Australian author

== See also ==
- Kenderdine Art Gallery, Saskatchewan
- Kenderdine Mill Complex, Pennsylvania
