= Sydney Beadle =

English cricketer

Personal information
- Full name: Sydney Wilford Beadle
- Born: 9 November 1885; Wadhwan, Bombay Presidency, British India
- Died: 24 July 1937 (aged 51); Reading Street, Kent, England
- Batting: Right-handed
- Bowling: Right-arm slow

Domestic team information
- Years: Team
- 1911: Hampshire

Career statistics
Competition	First-class
Matches	3
Runs scored	88
Batting average	14.66
100s/50s	–/–
Top score	28
Balls bowled	54
Wickets	0
Bowling average	–
5 wickets in innings	–
10 wickets in match	–
Best bowling	–
Catches/stumpings	2/–
- Source: Cricinfo, 30 December 2009

Sydney Wilford Beadle (9 November 1885 – 24 July 1937) was an English first-class cricketer and Royal Navy officer. He made three appearances in first-class cricket prior to the First World War, and during that conflict he fought in the Siege of Antwerp and became a prisoner of war when the city was captured by the Germans.

== Naval career and first-class cricket ==
Beadle was born in British India in the Princely State of Wadhwan. He was educated in England at Rossall School, entering in the third term of 1899 and leaving in the midsummer term of 1900. From there, he proceeded to the Britannia Royal Naval College. He graduated from there into the Royal Navy as a sub-lieutenant in March 1905, with promotion to lieutenant following in December 1906. Beadle made his debut in first-class cricket for a combined British Army and Royal Navy cricket team against a combined Oxford and Cambridge Universities cricket team at Aldershot in 1911, with him also playing for Hampshire against Sussex at Portsmouth in the 1911 County Championship. He made a third and final appearance in first-class the following season, for the Royal Navy against the British Army cricket team at Lord's. He scored 88 runs across his three matches, with a highest score of 28.

At his own request, he was placed on the Emergency List of the Royal Navy in August 1912, enabling him to move briefly to British Columbia. Beadle served in the First World War, during which he commanded Hawke Battalion, one of three Royal Navy battalions composed of reserve officers who were not required at sea, which became trapped during the Siege of Antwerp in September–October 1914. When the city fell to the German Army, Beadle was captured and interned in the Netherlands for the remainder of the war. During his internment, he was promoted to lieutenant commander in December 1914. Following the war, he worked in the London Stock Exchange. Beadle died suddenly on 24 July 1937 at Reading Street, Kent.
