= Arthur Cantrell =

English cricketer and Royal Marines officer

Brigadier Arthur Cantrell
- Born: Arthur Stanley Cantrell; 8 May 1883; British Ceylon
- Died: 22 May 1954 (aged 71); Black Notley, Essex, England
- Cricket career

Cricket information
- Batting: Right-handed
- Bowling: Right-arm medium-fast

Career statistics
Competition	First-class
Matches	15
Runs scored	308
Batting average	23.69
100s/50s	–/–
Top score	32*
Balls bowled	2,385
Wickets	49
Bowling average	25.63
5 wickets in innings	3
10 wickets in match	–
Best bowling	6/58
Catches/stumpings	6/–
- Source: Cricinfo, 29 January 2019

Brigadier Arthur Stanley Cantrell (8 May 1883 – 22 May 1954) was a Royal Marines officer and English first-class cricketer. Cantrell was commissioned into the Royal Marine Artillery and served during the First World War. His military service with the Royal Marines lasted until his retirement in 1934, though he did later come out of retirement to serve in the Second World War. Cantrell also played first-class cricket for the Royal Navy Cricket Club between 1913–1929, making fourteen appearances.

== Early life, first-class debut and WWI ==
Cantrell was born in British Ceylon and was educated in England at Bedford School and Bedford Modern School. He was commissioned into the Royal Marine Artillery (RMA) as a second lieutenant in August 1900, and promoted to the rank of lieutenant in February 1903, the appointment to date to July 1901. He was made a captain in September 1911. He made his debut in first-class cricket for the Royal Navy against the Army at Lord's in 1913. Shortly before the outbreak of World War I, Cantrell played a second first-class match for the Royal Navy in June 1914, in a repeat of the fixture of the previous year. At the beginning of 1914, he had been seconded to another battalion within the RMA.

Cantrell completed his sixteen years of service during the First World War, at which point he was promoted to major in June 1917. In May 1918, he was made a brevet lieutenant colonel. He was awarded the Legion of Honour by France in June 1918.

== Post-war service and later cricket ==
Cantrell resumed playing first-class cricket for the Royal Navy following the war, appearing for the Royal Navy against Cambridge University in June 1919. In August 1919, he made a first-class appearance for a combined Army and Navy cricket team against a team of Demobilised Officers at Lord's, during which he took his maiden five wicket haul when he took 5 for 52 in the Demobilised Officers first-innings. He continued to play first-class cricket for the Royal navy until 1929, by which point he had appeared in fourteen first-class matches for the Royal Navy. Playing as a right-arm medium-fast bowler, Cantrell took 44 wickets for the Royal Navy at an average of 27.36, with two five wicket hauls and best figures of 6 for 58.

He was promoted to the full rank of lieutenant colonel in July 1930. In October of the same year he was made the Director of Naval Recruiting. He was promoted to the rank of colonel in April 1934, with seniority antedated to June 1922. Three months later he retired from active service at his own request, and was placed on the Retired List. He came out of retirement during the Second World War, during which he was promoted to the rank of temporary brigadier in October 1941.

He died at the age of 71 in May 1954 at Black Notley, Essex.
