= Cyrus Ainsworth =

English cricketer

Personal information
- Full name: Cyrus Gerald Ainsworth
- Born: 4 August 1888; Bury, Greater Manchester, England
- Died: 20 February 1940 (aged 51); Elton, Lancashire, England
- Batting: Unknown

Career statistics
Competition	First-class
Matches	1
Runs scored	77
Batting average	38.50
100s/50s	–/1
Top score	71
Balls bowled	–
Wickets	–
Bowling average	–
5 wickets in innings	–
10 wickets in match	–
Best bowling	–
Catches/stumpings	–/–
- Source: Cricinfo, 1 November 2013

Cyrus Gerald Ainsworth (4 August 1888 – 20 February 1940) was an English first-class cricketer. Ainsworth's batting style is unknown. He was born at Bury, Greater Manchester.

Ainsworth qualified as a surgeon prior to 1915. It was during World War I that he was enlisted as a surgeon in the Royal Navy in September 1915. He continued to serve in the Royal Navy following the end of the war, as he was selected to play a first-class cricket match for the Royal Navy against Cambridge University at Fenner's in 1919. In a match Cambridge University won by an innings and 84 runs, Ainsworth scored 6 runs in the Royal Navy's first-innings, before he was dismissed by Gordon Fairbairn, while in their second-innings he top scored with 71, before being dismissed by Gilbert Ashton.

He died at Elton, Lancashire on 20 February 1940.
