= Christ Church, Theale =

Church in Somerset, England

Christ Church
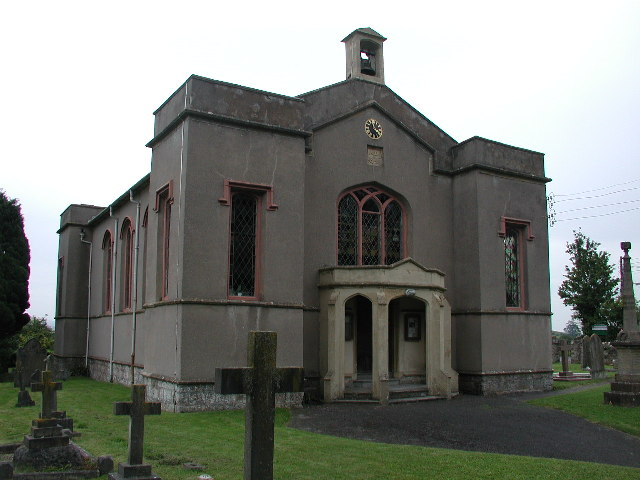

Religion
- Affiliation: Church of England
- Ecclesiastical or organizational status: Active
- Year consecrated: 1828

Location
- Location: Theale, Somerset, England
- Interactive map of Christ Church
- Coordinates: 51.2113°N 2.7632°W

Architecture
- Architect: Richard Carver
- Type: Church
- Style: Gothic Revival

Christ Church is a Church of England church in Theale, Somerset, England. It was built in 1826–28 to the design of Richard Carver and is a Grade II listed building.

== History ==
Christ Church was built as a chapel of ease to the parish church of St Mary in Wedmore. As a result of the growing population of the parish during the early 19th century, the vicar of Wedmore, Rev. John Richards, sought to provide additional church accommodation for the outlying parts of the parish. The population of Wedmore had reached over 3,000 by 1824 and the parish church was only capable of accommodating 700 people. A chapel of ease for the hamlet of Blackford (Holy Trinity) was opened in 1823 and efforts then concentrated on a church at Theale. Plans for the church were drawn up by Richard Carver, and the foundation stone was laid in January 1826 by Rev. James Richards, brother and successor of Rev. John Richards as vicar of Wedmore.

The church was consecrated by the Bishop of Bath and Wells, the Right Rev. George Henry Law, on 7 January 1828. Following the consecration, a "most impressive and highly appropriate" sermon was provided by the Bishop of Lichfield, the Right Rev. Henry Ryder. The completed church provided approximately 200 free sittings for use of the poor, and also served the small settlements of Panborough and Bagley.

Theale was made its own ecclesiastical parish on 11 October 1844. A new organ built by Messrs. Sweetland of Bath was opened at the church on 22 December 1884. A new font was consecrated at the church on 24 May 1959 by the vicar of Mark, Rev. W. T. Morris. The font was gifted by relatives in memory of Rev. William Jolliffe Thomas, a former vicar of Theale, Mr. E. H. Thomas and Mrs. G. Thomas.

== Architecture ==
Christ Church is built of rendered Wedmore stone and a flat slate roof. It is made up of a nave, chancel and south porch. The west end has a bell-cot containing one bell. The church has an oblong shape, with projecting sections at all four corners. The main entrance has a semi-octagonal porch of ashlar stone. The gallery displays the Hanoverian arms. In his 1958 book South and West Somerset, Nikolaus Pevsner described the chancel and its glazing as being reminiscent of "the bow-window of a house", which created a "surprising and attractive effect". Fittings of the church include a painted reredos, an early 19th-century pulpit and altar table, 17th-century coffin stools, a 19th-century organ and a 20th-century font.

The churchyard contains Theale's war memorial, which was designated a Grade II listed monument in 2016. The stone column was erected after World War I and was later altered to add additional names after World War II.
