= Walter Parke =

English cricketer and British Army officer (1891–1914)

Personal information
- Full name: Walter Evelyn Parke
- Born: 27 July 1891; Wimborne Minster, Dorset, England
- Died: 13 October 1914 (aged 23); Hazebrouck, Nord, France
- Batting: Left-handed

Career statistics
Competition	First-class
Matches	1
Runs scored	18
Batting average	9.00
100s/50s	–/–
Top score	11
Catches/stumpings	1/–
- Source: Cricinfo, 16 April 2019

Walter Evelyn Parke (27 July 1891 – 13 October 1914) was an English first-class cricketer and British Army officer. Parke served in the Durham Light Infantry, seeing action in France during the opening stages of the First World War. He was killed in October 1914. He also played first-class cricket for the British Army cricket team.

== Life and military career ==
The son of the minor counties cricketer Lieutenant Colonel Lawrence Parke and his wife, Evelyn Jane Aelfrida, he was born at Wimborne Minster. He was educated at Winchester College from 1905–09, where he captained the college cricket team in his final year. Additionally, he played golf for the college and was appointed a prefect. From Winchester he attended the Royal Military College, Sandhurst. He graduated into the Durham Light Infantry as a second lieutenant in August 1911. He made a single appearance in first-class cricket for the British Army cricket team against Cambridge University at Fenner's in 1914. Batting twice in the match as an opening batsman, he was dismissed for 11 runs by Gordon Fairbairn in the Army's first-innings, while in their second-innings he was dismissed 7 runs by the same bowler.

He served in the 2nd Battalion, Durham Light Infantry during the First World War, proceeding to France in September 1914. He had been promoted to the rank of lieutenant in August 1914. He was killed while attempting to lift a machine gun over a hedge near Hazebrouck on the afternoon of 13 October 1914, while commanding the machine gun section. His initial burial site at the Vieux-Berquin crossroads was the subject of a famous photograph of two young French girls tending to his grave. His body was subsequently moved to the Outtersteene Communal Cemetery Extension at Bailleul.
