= General Leach =

General Leach may refer to:

- Edward Pemberton Leach (1847–1913), British Army general
- George E. Leach (1876–1955), U.S. Army major general
- Henry Leach (British Army officer) (1870–1936), British Army brigadier general
- William Leach (Canadian Army officer) (1942–2015), Canadian Armed Forced lieutenant general
