= William Leach (cricketer, born 1883) =

English cricketer and Royal Navy officer

Personal information
- Full name: William Robert Ronald Leach
- Born: 3 April 1883; Kensington, Middlesex, England
- Died: 1 November 1969 (aged 86); Eastbourne, Sussex, England
- Batting: Right-handed
- Bowling: Slow left-arm orthodox

Career statistics
| Competition | First-class |
|---|---|
| Matches | 1 |
| Runs scored | 13 |
| Batting average | 6.50 |
| 100s/50s | –/– |
| Top score | 12 |
| Balls bowled | 66 |
| Wickets | 3 |
| Bowling average | 20.33 |
| 5 wickets in innings | 0 |
| 10 wickets in match | 0 |
| Best bowling | 3/61 |
| Catches/stumpings | 1/– |
- Source: Cricinfo, 15 December 2019

William Robert Ronald Leach (3 April 1883 – 1 November 1969) was an English first-class cricketer and Royal Navy officer.

The son of Major-General Edmund Leach and Frances Elizabeth Ince, he was born at Kensington in April 1883. He was commissioned as a sub-lieutenant in the Royal Navy in September 1902, with promotion to lieutenant following in April 1905. Leach later made a single appearance in first-class cricket for the Royal Navy against the British Army cricket team at Lord's in 1913. He took 3 wickets in the Army first-innings, dismissing Douglas Robinson, Arthur Turner and Francis Wilson to finish with figures of 3 for 61. He was dismissed by Francis Wyatt in both the Royal Navy innings', with the Army winning the match by 10 wickets.

After serving in the First World War, he was placed on the retired list at his own request in December 1919, at which point he held the rank of lieutenant commander. Although retired, he was made a commander in April 1923. Leach died at Eastbourne in November 1969. His brother Henry Leach was a Brigadier-General in the army.
