= Edwin Pain =

Welsh cricketer and Royal Navy sailor

Personal information
- Full name: Edwin Llewellyn Pain
- Born: 2 June 1891; Swansea, Glamorgan, Wales
- Died: 14 July 1947 (aged 56); Plymouth, Devon, England
- Batting: Right-handed
- Bowling: Right-arm medium

Domestic team information
- Years: Team
- 1932: Devon
- 1926: Royal Navy

Career statistics
Competition	First-class
Matches	1
Runs scored	18
Batting average	9.00
100s/50s	–/–
Top score	17
Balls bowled	204
Wickets	3
Bowling average	33.00
5 wickets in innings	–
10 wickets in match	–
Best bowling	3/90
Catches/stumpings	2/–
- Source: Cricinfo, 15 March 2011

Edwin Llewellyn Pain (2 June 1891 – 14 July 1947) was a Welsh cricketer and Royal Navy sailor. Pain was a right-handed batsman who bowled right-arm medium pace. He was born in Swansea, Glamorgan.

Pain made his only first-class appearance for the Royal Navy against the Army at Lord's in 1926. In this match he scored 17 runs in the Royal Navy first-innings, before being dismissed by Philip Davies. In their second-innings he scored a single run before being dismissed by Kenneth Mackessack. With the ball he claimed 3 wickets in the Army's first-innings. In 1932 he played four Minor Counties Championship fixtures for Devon.

He died in Plymouth, Devon on 14 July 1947.
