= Francis Wilson (English cricketer) =

English cricketer and British Army officer

Personal information
- Full name: Francis Tyrwhitt Drake Wilson
- Born: 9 April 1876; Cottesbrooke, Northamptonshire
- Died: 19 March 1964 (aged 87); Great Horkesley, Essex
- Batting: Right-handed
- Bowling: Right-arm leg-break
- Role: All-rounder
- Relatives: H. L. Wilson (brother)

Domestic team information
- Years: Team
- 1908–1911: Suffolk (minor counties matches)
- 1910: Army and Navy
- 1913–1920: Army
- 1914: Marylebone Cricket Club (MCC)

Career statistics
Competition	FC
Matches	5
Runs scored	103
Batting average	14.71
100s/50s	0/0
Top score	39
Balls bowled	598
Wickets	18
Bowling average	16.50
5 wickets in innings	2
10 wickets in match	0
Best bowling	5/57
Catches/stumpings	2/–
- Source: CricketArchive, 27 November 2014

Lieutenant-Colonel Francis Tyrwhitt Drake Wilson, OBE (9 April 1876 – 19 March 1964) was a British Army officer and cricketer who played minor counties cricket for Suffolk and first-class cricket for Army, Army and Navy, and Marylebone Cricket Club (MCC) sides.

Born in Cottesbrooke, a small Northamptonshire village, Wilson was the oldest of three cricketing brothers, each of whom played for Suffolk in the Minor Counties Championship. The youngest brother, Herbert Wilson, went on to play for (and briefly captain) Sussex, playing more than 100 matches over eleven seasons at the club. The three brothers played together on numerous occasions, from the 1908 season through to the 1910 season. Francis Wilson was the last brother to debut for Suffolk, but on his debut against Norfolk in June 1908, which marked the first time the three brothers appeared together, he scored 183 runs. His last recorded appearance for Suffolk was a single match in August 1911, against Norfolk. By this time, he had made his first-class debut, playing for a combined Army and Navy side against a Combined Universities team.

Despite his earlier century for Suffolk, Wilson achieved more success as a bowler at higher levels. Bowling leg breaks, he took eight wickets on his first-class debut, which included a five-wicket haul, 5/60, in the second innings. Wilson's next two first-class matches came in the 1913 and 1914 seasons, in the inter-services Army vs Navy games. He captained the Army to a 170-run victory in the June 1914 fixture, and was subsequently selected for the MCC in a match against Cambridge University the following month, played at Lord's. Wilson's fifth and final first-class match came in the Army–Navy fixture during the 1920 season, after the conclusion of the First World War. Aged 44, he recorded his best bowling figures, 5/57, in the Navy's first innings, helping his side win by an innings and 14 runs.

Wilson had been commissioned into the army as a second lieutenant in the Suffolk Regiment on 5 September 1896, and was promoted to lieutenant on 13 December 1897. He saw active service with the 1st battalion in South Africa during the Second Boer War, during which he was promoted to captain on 14 October 1901. After the end of this war in June 1902, the battalion returned home on the SS Canada in September that year. He reached the rank of lieutenant-colonel during the First World War. He was appointed an OBE in 1924, and retired the following year, settling in Great Horkesley, Essex. He played competitive cricket into his fifties, for the Free Foresters and for Gentlemen of Essex sides. Wilson died in Great Horkesley in 1964, aged 87. His son, Colonel Nathaniel John Wilson (also an OBE), married a daughter of Sir Pierce Lacy, 1st Bt., a previous High Sheriff of Suffolk.
