= Edward Aylmer (cricketer) =

English cricketer and Royal Navy officer

Captain Edward Aylmer DSC
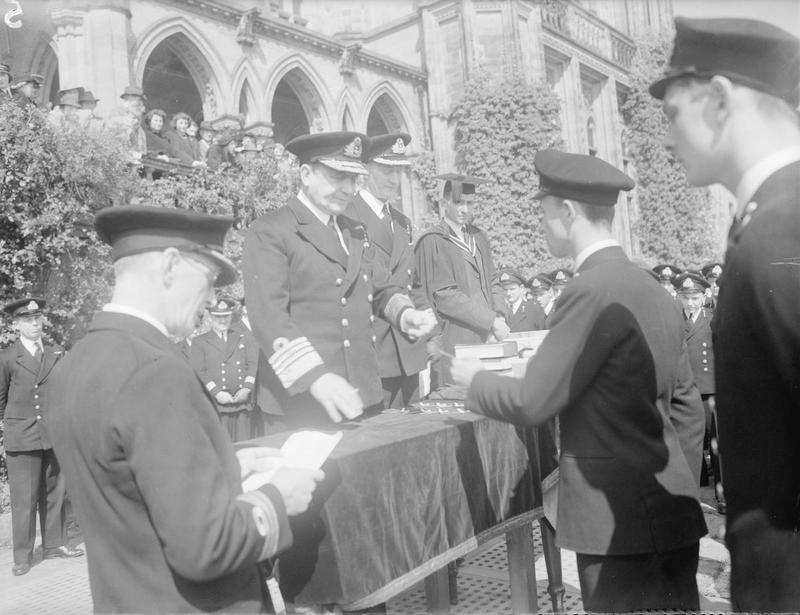
- Aylmer (centre) in 1943

Personal information
- Full name: Edward Arthur Aylmer
- Born: 12 November 1891; Falmouth, Cornwall, England
- Died: 30 October 1974 (aged 82); Askerswell, Dorset, England
- Batting: Unknown
- Bowling: Unknown

Career statistics
Competition	First-class
Matches	1
Runs scored	20
Batting average	20.00
100s/50s	0/0
Top score	10*
Balls bowled	54
Wickets	1
Bowling average	38.00
5 wickets in innings	0
10 wickets in match	0
Best bowling	1/19
Catches/stumpings	1/–
- Source: Cricinfo, 29 May 2019

Edward Arthur Aylmer DSC (20 March 1892 – 30 October 1974) was an English first-class cricketer and Royal Navy officer. He served in the Royal Navy from 1911–1945, seeing action in both the First World War and the Second World War. Reaching the rank of captain, he commanded several ships and establishments during his career. He also played first-class cricket for the Royal Navy Cricket Club.

== Life and naval career ==
Alymer was born at Falmouth to Frederick Arthur Aylmer and his wife, Constance Isabella Grenfell. He entered the Royal Navy Training Establishment in January 1905, graduating in January 1911 when he was posted to HMS Hermes as a midshipman. Having been made an acting sub-lieutenant in September 1912, he was promoted to the full rank in May 1913. He served with the Royal Navy during the First World War, with promotion to the rank of lieutenant in December 1914. He was awarded the Distinguished Service Cross in June 1917.

He made a single appearance in first-class cricket for the Royal Navy against Cambridge University at Fenner's in 1920. Batting twice in the match, he was dismissed by Charles Marriott for 10 runs in the Royal Navy first-innings, while in their second-innings he was unbeaten on 10. He took a single wicket in the Cambridge University first-innings, when he dismissed Jack MacBryan to finish with innings figures of 1 for 19, though he went wicketless in their second-innings. He was promoted to the rank of lieutenant commander in December 1922, and was given his first command when he was placed in command of the submarine HMS R4. He was placed in command of HMS L23 in June 1924, a post he held until May 1926. He was promoted to the rank of commander in June 1927. Between 1926 and 1929, Aylmer commanded HMS Adamant and HMS Pigmy, before commanding the minesweeper HMS Marazion from 1930 to 1932, during which the ship was present at the sinking of HMS Poseidon.

== Later naval career and life ==
From 1933 to 1935, he was the commanding officer aboard HMS Titania and commanded the 6th Submarine Flotilla. He was promoted to the rank of captain in June 1935. He was present at the Royal Naval College from March–July 1936, before commanding HMS Cyclops, HMS Douglas and the 1st Submarine Flotilla from July 1936 to June 1938. He captained HMS Hastings from June–September 1939, before becoming the commanding officer of HMS Curacoa from December 1939 to August 1940. From August 1940 to February 1942, he commanded HMS Newcastle. While commanding HMS Newcastle he escorted George II of Greece to exile in Britain. He was mentioned in dispatches in January 1942, and was made a recipient of the Order of George I for his role in escorting George II to exile. From April 1942 to August 1943, he was the commanding officer of the Royal Naval College, Eaton. He served as the naval aide-de-camp to George VI from January–July 1944, while also serving as the naval officer in charge of HMS Sheba in the Colony of Aden. He retired from active service soon after.

He died in October 1974 at Askerwell, Dorset. His wife, Gladwys Phoebe Evans, predeceased him by six years. Their only son, Gerald Aylmer, was a historian of 17th century England.
