= Philip Irwin =

English cricketer and Royal Navy officer

Personal information
- Full name: Philip Hastings Irwin
- Born: 1 November 1884; Didsbury, Lancashire, England
- Died: 12 January 1958 (aged 73); Saint Peter Port, Guernsey
- Batting: Right-handed
- Relatives: Frank Wright (grandfather)

Domestic team information
- Years: Team
- 1924: Marylebone Cricket Club
- 1924: Minor Counties
- 1921–1925: Cornwall
- 1914–1919: Royal Navy

Career statistics
| Competition | First-class |
|---|---|
| Matches | 4 |
| Runs scored | 207 |
| Batting average | 25.87 |
| 100s/50s | –/2 |
| Top score | 80 |
| Balls bowled | – |
| Wickets | – |
| Bowling average | – |
| 5 wickets in innings | – |
| 10 wickets in match | – |
| Best bowling | – |
| Catches/stumpings | –/– |
- Source: Cricinfo, 6 May 2012

Commander Philip Hastings Irwin (1 November 1884 – 12 January 1958) was an English cricketer and Royal Navy officer. Irwin was a right-handed batsman. He was born at Didsbury, Lancashire.

Irwin was an acting sub-lieutenant in the Royal Navy in 1905. It was in September of that year that he was given the full rank of sub-lieutenant. In April 1907, he was promoted to the rank of lieutenant. Irwin made his debut for the Royal Navy in first-class cricket against the British Army at Lord's in June 1914, a match in which he scored his maiden half century in his first innings, with a score of 66 opening the batting.

Irwin served in the Royal Navy during World War I, and at some point during the conflict he obtained the rank of lieutenant commander. Following the war, he was promoted to the rank of commander on 31 December 1918. In June 1919 he made a second first-class appearance for the Royal Navy, in a match against Cambridge University at Fenner's, making scores of 2 and 0 in a heavy loss for the Royal Navy. Irwin later joined Cornwall, most likely while posted at HMNB Devonport in Plymouth, with his debut for the county coming against Devon in the 1921 Minor Counties Championship. He played Minor counties cricket for Cornwall until 1925, making 41 appearances during that time. Playing for Cornwall made Irwin eligible to be selected for a combined Minor Counties team, appearing in one first-class match for the team in 1924 against HDG Leveson Gower's XI at The Saffrons, Eastbourne. Dismissed for a duck by Francis Browne in their first-innings, he improved in their second-innings with a score of 80, his second first-class half century. In that same season, he appeared in another first-class match for the Marylebone Cricket Club against Oxford University at Lord's, though he had little success in this match.

After retiring from the Royal Navy, Irwin joined the Foreign Office as a Vice consul in the General Consular Service. Irwin was later added to the British Army reserve list with the rank of captain shortly after the start of World War II in September 1939. He served at some point in the war with the Black Watch, continued to serve with them until 1948, when age forced him to relinquish his command, after which he was granted the honorary rank of major.

Irwin later died at Saint Peter Port, Guernsey, on 12 January 1958. His grandfather, Frank Wright, was a first-class cricketer in the 1820s and 1830s.
