= Sidney Bollon =

English cricketer (1899 – 1986)

Personal information
- Full name: Sidney Bollon
- Born: 3 December 1899; Edmonton, Middlesex, England
- Died: 28 October 1986 (aged 86); Tavistock, Devon, England
- Batting: Unknown
- Bowling: Unknown-arm fast-medium

Career statistics
Competition	First-class
Matches	1
Runs scored	9
Batting average	9.00
100s/50s	–/–
Top score	9
Balls bowled	193
Wickets	6
Bowling average	13.50
5 wickets in innings	1
10 wickets in match	–
Best bowling	5/59
Catches/stumpings	2/–
- Source: Cricinfo, 21 March 2019

Sidney Bollon (3 December 1899 – 28 October 1986) was an English first-class cricketer.

Shortly after the conclusion of the First World War, Bollon played first-class cricket for a Demobilised Officers cricket team against a combined Army and Navy cricket team at Lord's in 1919. He bowled 23.1 overs in the Army and Navy first-innings, taking figures of 5 for 59. In the Demobilised Officers first-innings, he was dismissed for 9 runs by Nigel Haig. He followed up his five wickets in the Army and Navy first-innings by taking the wicket of John Tasker.

In 1920 he began working for the railways, later holding the position of publicity officer for the British Transport Commission. He worked for the railways until 1962. He died at Tavistock in October 1986.
