= Reading Street =

Reading Street may refer to:

- Reading Street, Ashford, Kent, England, United Kingdom
- Reading Street, Thanet, Kent, England, United Kingdom
