= John Hussey (Royal Navy cricketer) =

English cricketer and Royal Navy officer

Personal information
- Full name: John Allen Hussey
- Born: 17 April 1897; Axbridge, Somerset, England
- Died: 18 August 1969 (aged 72); Raynes Park, Surrey, England
- Batting: Right-handed
- Relatives: Derrick Hall (brother-in-law)

Career statistics
Competition	First-class
Matches	1
Runs scored	54
Batting average	54.00
100s/50s	–/1
Top score	54
Catches/stumpings	1/–
- Source: Cricinfo, 23 December 2019

John Allen Hussey OBE (17 April 1897 – 18 August 1969) was an English first-class cricketer and Royal Navy officer.

Hussey served in the First World War with the Royal Navy as an acting paymaster sub-lieutenant, for which he was commended in the London Gazette. He was confirmed in the rank of paymaster sub-lieutenant in January 1919, with promotion to the rank of paymaster lieutenant following in July 1919. He was promoted to paymaster lieutenant commander in July 1927. Hussey made a single appearance in first-class cricket for the Royal Navy against the Royal Air Force at Chatham in 1929. Batting once in the match, Hussey top scored in the Royal Navy first-innings with 54, before being dismissed by Reginald Fulljames. He was promoted to paymaster commander in June 1935.

Hussey served in the Second World War, during which he was appointed an OBE. In the year following the war, he was promoted to paymaster captain. He was appointed as a naval aide-de-camp to George VI in November 1951, later briefly serving Elizabeth II in the same role. He retired from active service in April 1952. Hussey died in August 1969 at Raynes Park, Surrey. His brother-in-law, Derrick Hall, also played first-class cricket, with Hussey having married his sister, Elizabeth, in May 1934.
