= Anthony Henniker-Gotley =

England international rugby union player

- Born: Anthony Lefroy Henniker-Gotley; 2 March 1887 Tysoe, Warwickshire, England
- Died: 4 May 1972 (aged 85) Torbay, England
- School: Tonbridge School
- University: University of Oxford
- Occupation: Lawyer

Rugby union career
- Position: Scrum-half
Senior career
Years	Team	Apps	(Points)
- Oxford University RFC
–	Blackheath FC		
–	Barbarian FC		
–	Surrey		
–	Kent		
International career
Years	Team	Apps	(Points)
1910–1911	England	6	(0)
1910	Combined British	1	

Anthony Henniker-Gotley (2 March 1887 – 4 May 1972) was a rugby union international who represented England from 1910 to 1911. He also captained that country.

== Early life ==
Anthony Henniker-Gotley was born on 2 March 1887 in Tysoe, Warwickshire. He was the son of a vicar, the Revd George Henniker Gotley MA.

== Rugby union career ==
Henniker-Gotley played as a scrum half for his school, Tonbridge School. At his previous school, West Downs School, Winchester a boarding school for boys aged between eight and thirteen, he had been an avid cricketer, playing in the first XI in 1899 to 1901. After Tonbridge he went up to the University of Oxford and there received his Blue in 1909. At a club level he played for Blackheath FC and at a representative level played for Barbarian FC (playing in the Barbarians: v Leicester 1909 match ending 9–9) as well as county rugby for both Surrey and Kent.

Henniker-Gotley made his international debut on 3 March 1910 at Parc des Princes in the France vs England match. Of the 6 matches he played for his national side he was on the winning side on 4 occasions. He played his final match for England on 18 March 1911 at Twickenham in the England vs Scotland match, in which game he captained England for the only time.

Henniker-Gotley was also an early British and Irish Lion, representing the Combined British in the 1910 tour of Argentina, in which he featured in the only international match against the host nation.

== Career outside sport ==
Henniker-Gotley moved to Rhodesia in 1911. During the First World War he served in the North Rhodesia Police and served in East Africa. He was a political officer in Tanganyika from 1918 to 1923 and called to the Bar in 1923. He then became the District Commissioner in Tanganyika in 1923, and served in this capacity until 1926. From 1926 he went into business in Durban until 1933 and then became Bursar and assistant master at St Columba's College, Dublin, from 1934 to 1936.

From 1936 he acted as a Temporary Education Officer for the Royal Air Force and then served in the Royal Air Force Volunteer Reserve as a Flight Lieutenant in Fighter Command. After the outbreak of the Second World War he was promoted to Squadron Leader in 1941. Following the war he was a civilian Substitution Officer with the RAF until 1947.

== Personal and later life ==
Henniker-Gotley married Nora McMaster (17 May 1894 to 31 July 1979) on 2 June 1923. Her father was the Test cricketer Emile McMaster and her brother was the first-class cricketer Michael McMaster. He died on 4 May 1972.
