= Frank Horsey =

English cricketer and Royal Navy officer

Paymaster Captain Frank Horsey CB OBE DSC
- Born: Frank Lankester Horsey; 22 January 1884; Woodbridge, Suffolk, England
- Died: 19 August 1956 (aged 72); Hide Stile, Surrey, England
- Cricket career

Cricket information
- Batting: Right-handed
- Bowling: Right-arm fast-medium

Career statistics
Competition	First-class
Matches	1
Runs scored	23
Batting average	11.50
100s/50s	–/–
Top score	15
Balls bowled	60
Wickets	2
Bowling average	8.50
5 wickets in innings	–
10 wickets in match	–
Best bowling	2/17
Catches/stumpings	1/–
- Source: Cricinfo, 31 August 2019

Frank Lankester Horsey (22 January 1884 – 19 August 1956) was a Royal Navy paymaster officer, serving from 1905 to 1939, and English first-class cricketer.

Horsey was born in Suffolk at Woodbridge in January 1884, son of F. J. Horsey, of the Inland Revenue Service. He was employed as a clerk in the Admiralty, with promotion to the rank of assistant paymaster coming in January 1905. Horsey made a single appearance in first-class cricket for the Royal Navy against the British Army cricket team at Lord's in 1914. Batting twice in the match, he was dismissed in the Royal Navy first-innings for 15 runs by William Parker, while in their second-innings he was dismissed for 8 runs by Francis Wilson. He took two wickets in the Army's second-innings, dismissing Charles Loyd and Harold Fawcus to finish with figures of 2 for 17 from ten overs. During the First World War, he was promoted to the rank of paymaster in November 1916 and in April 1917 he received the Distinguished Service Cross. He was made an OBE in the 1919 Birthday Honours, for valuable services to Rear-Admiral John Laurd. He was promoted to the rank of paymaster commander in November 1922. He was made a companion of the Order of the Bath in the 1931 Birthday Honours, with promotion to the rank of paymaster captain following in June 1933. Horsey retired from active service in January 1939 and died at Surrey in August 1956. He had married in 1917, Ada, daughter of E. H. Hearn. Their son, Dr Peter John Horsey, was of Downside House, Winchester, Hampshire; he married Rosemary Heaton-Ellis, of that gentry family of Wyddial Hall.
