= Michael McMaster =

English cricketer, naval officer, and businessman

Personal information
- Full name: Michael McMaster
- Born: 11 May 1896; Porlock, Somerset, England
- Died: 29 March 1965 (aged 68); Brook, Isle of Wight, England
- Batting: Unknown
- Bowling: Unknown
- Relatives: Emile McMaster (father)

Career statistics
Competition	First-class
Matches	1
Runs scored	13
Batting average	13.00
100s/50s	–/–
Top score	7*
Balls bowled	84
Wickets	1
Bowling average	73.00
5 wickets in innings	–
10 wickets in match	–
Best bowling	1/55
Catches/stumpings	1/–
- Source: Cricinfo, 24 December 2019

Michael McMaster (11 May 1896 – 29 March 1965) was an English first-class cricketer, Royal Naval Air Service officer and businessman.

The son of the Test cricketer Emile McMaster, he was born in May 1896 at Porlock, Somerset. He served in the First World War in the Royal Naval Air Service, being commissioned as a probationary sub-lieutenant, with his probation expiring in April 1917. He was promoted to flight lieutenant in August 1917. Following the war, McMaster made a single appearance in first-class cricket for the Royal Navy against Cambridge University at Fenner's in 1920. He scored 13 runs in the match, in addition to taking the wicket of Gilbert Ashton in the Cambridge first-innings. He was placed on the retired list at his own request in September 1920.

After leaving the Royal Navy, McMaster entered into the world of business, which took him to South Africa with Taylor and Ellis in Durban, before serving as the chairman of Slazenger. He died at Brook on the Isle of Wight in March 1965. His brother-in-law was the rugby union international Anthony Henniker-Gotley.
