= Robeston Wathen =

Village and parish in Pembrokeshire, Wales

Coordinates: 51.806°N 4.781°W

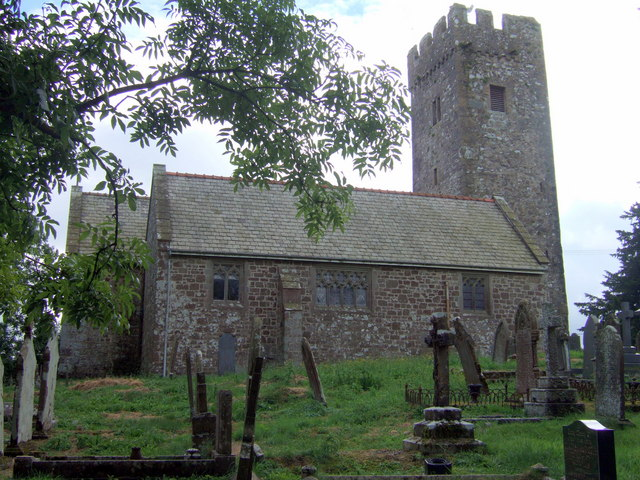
- St Andrew's Church, Robeston Wathen

- Location within Pembrokeshire
- OS grid reference: SN0815
- Community: Llawhaden
- Principal area: Pembrokeshire
- Country: Wales
- Sovereign state: United Kingdom
- Post town: Narberth
- Postcode district: SA67
- Police: Dyfed-Powys
- Fire: Mid and West Wales
- Ambulance: Welsh
- UK Parliament: Carmarthen West and South Pembrokeshire
- Senedd Cymru – Welsh Parliament: Carmarthen West and South Pembrokeshire

Robeston Wathen is a rural village and parish in Pembrokeshire, Wales, 2 miles (3.2 km) west of Narberth, on the former Narberth to Haverfordwest turnpike subsequently designated the A40 which bypassed the village in 2011. Robeston Wathen is in the community of Llawhaden.

The village is mediaeval, and limestone was quarried there.

== Name ==
The village was recorded as Villa Roberti in 1282, referring to an unknown Robert. It was referred to as Roberdeston ("Robert's Farm") in 1357 and as Robertson Wathen in 1545, though a 1578 map published in 1583 labels it Robeston. The suffix "Wathen" refers to the Wathen family, who occupied the manor from the 15th century; the surname ultimately derives from the personal name Gwaiddan.

== History ==
The parish has evidence of Neolithic and Bronze Age occupation, discovered during the building of the bypass (see below). In Norman times Robeston Wathen was in the ancient administrative area of Narberth Hundred.

Robeston House (or Robeston Wathen House), of uncertain date but at least as early as 1800, is a Grade II listed building; it was a hotel from 1977 to 1999. In 1833 the parish had a population of 421. A school was started in the 1860s for 90 local children. It closed in 1971 and is now the village hall.

Wilson's Gazetteer of 1872 describes the parish as covering 1,345 acres (544 ha) with a population of 362 living in 92 houses.

Limestone, sandstone and conglomerate was quarried at Robeston Wathen Quarries at least until 1931. It is now a Site of Special Scientific Interest, so designated in 1967 to protect its fragile geological elements: the limestone is extremely rich in corals, particularly halysitids, and contains rare brachiopods. The site covers 1.67 ha and is managed by Natural Resources Wales. Some of the houses in the village are built from stone quarried there.

The Robeston Wathen Village Association was founded in 1989.

Until 2011 the main A40 trunk road passed through the village, effectively cutting it in two. The bypass was completed at a cost of £41 million and opened in March 2011. Access to Robeston Wathen village is by roundabouts to the east and west of the village.

== Amenities ==
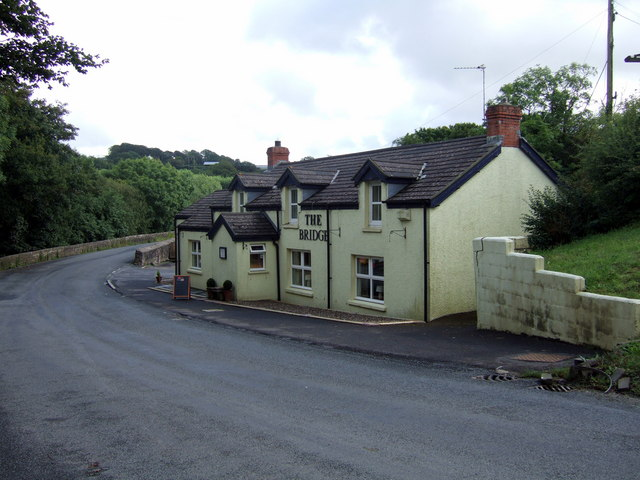
The Bridge at Coxlake

The village has a petrol station and garage with an integral shop. To the west of the village is The Bush Inn, formerly a small cottage inn, which has become a larger concern and to the southeast at Coxlake is The Bridge, formerly Bridge End, an inn (now closed) on the Robeston Wathen to Narberth road, now the B4314.

== Church ==
The parish is in the Diocese of St David's and the parish church is known as Holy Cross Church and is dedicated to St Andrew. It was rebuilt in the 19th century on its mediaeval foundations; the tower is 14th or 15th century. It is a Grade II listed building.

In the churchyard is the war memorial to those who lost their lives in two world wars.

== Notable people ==
- Major-General Sir Edmund Leach KCB (1836–1923), a senior British army officer who served in the Crimea and New Zealand, was born in the village.
