= Robeston Wathen Quarries =

Protected area in Pembrokeshire, Wales

- Site of Special Scientific Interest
- Location within Wales
- Location of Robeston Wathen Quarries.
- Area of search: Pembrokeshire
- Grid reference: SN084160
- Coordinates: 51.810°N 4.780°W
- Interest: Geological
- Area: 1.64 ha (4.1 acres)
- Notification date: 1967

Robeston Wathen Quarries is a Site of Special Scientific Interest (or SSSI) in Pembrokeshire, South Wales, immediately to the north of the village of Robeston Wathen. It has been designated as a Site of Special Scientific Interest since January 1967 in an attempt to protect its fragile geological elements. The site has an area of 1.64 hectares and is managed by Natural Resources Wales.

== Type ==
This site is designated due to its geological quality: Robeston Wathen Quarries SSSI has one special feature: Caradoc - Ashgill (late Ordovician) sedimentary rocks in disused quarries and a stream bed. In Wales, geological sites range from quarries to rocky outcrops and massive sea-cliffs. 30% of SSSIs in Wales are notified for geological and geomorphological features.

The sedimentary rocks of impure limestones, calcareous mudstones and black mudstones have yielded a variety of fossils which include evidence that the rocks are from the Caradoc – Ashgill stages - around 440 million years ago. The fossils also provide a means of correlation with other similar sites, and are catalogued by National Museum Wales.

== See also ==
- List of Sites of Special Scientific Interest in Pembrokeshire
