= Gerald Aylmer =

English historian (1926–2000)

- Born: Gerald Edward Aylmer; 30 April 1926; Greete, Shropshire, England, United Kingdom
- Died: 17 December 2000 (aged 74); Oxford, Oxfordshire, England, United Kingdom
- Education: Balliol College, Oxford
- Occupation: Historian
- Parent(s): Edward Arthur Aylmer, Phoebe Evans

Gerald Edward Aylmer (30 April 1926, Greete, Shropshire – 17 December 2000, Oxford) was an English historian of 17th century England.

Gerald Aylmer was the only child of Edward Arthur Aylmer, from an Anglo-Irish naval family, and Phoebe Evans. A great-uncle was Lord Desborough. Educated at Beaudesert Park School and Winchester College, he went to Balliol College, Oxford for a term before volunteering for the Navy, where he was a shipmate of George Melly. Returning to Balliol, he was tutored by Christopher Hill. He graduated in 1950, spent a year at Princeton University as a Jane Eliza Procter Visiting Fellow, and completed his thesis, 'Studies on the Institutions and Personnel of English Central Administration, 1625–42' (1954) as a Junior Research Fellow at Balliol. The thesis, in two volumes, was 1208 pages long: the Modern History Board subsequently introduced a word-limit.)

In 1954, Alymer went to Manchester University as an assistant lecturer, and in the following year married Ursula Nixon. Appointed lecturer at Manchester in 1962, he was then invited, aged 36, to become the first Professor of History at University of York. In 1979, he returned to Oxford as Master of St Peter's College, presiding over an improvement in academic performance at the college, increased endowment and building extensions before retiring in 1991. He remained an active publisher for the remaining nine years of his life before dying in hospital following what appeared to be routine surgery.

In 1993 Aylmer was honoured with a festschrift edited by his long-time colleagues John Morrill and Paul Slack and his former doctoral student Daniel Woolf.

Aylmer was on the editorial board of the History of Parliament Trust from 1968 to 1998, and chaired the board from 1989 to 1997. A Commissioner for Historical Manuscripts from 1978, he chaired the commission from 1989 to 1989. He was elected Fellow of the British Academy in 1976, and President of the Royal Historical Society between 1984 and 1988.

Aylmer's most substantial historical contribution was his trilogy on seventeenth-century administration before, during and after the Civil War. Alymer brought a prosopographical method to the study of 17th century bureaucracy, as well as an interest in the political sociology of bureaucracy in Max Weber, James Burnham and Milovan Djilas. The first volume – a careful statistical study of Charles I's officials – effectively rebutted Hugh Trevor-Roper's attribution of the rise of the gentry to the profits of royal office, and characterisation of the Civil War as a conflict between 'rising' and 'declining' gentry. The second volume showed that Interregnum reforms had real, if not absolute, effects; the third, published posthumously, treated the partial return to older practices under Charles II. In this final volume, Aylmer described himself as "an old Whig (and one with some residual Leveller leanings too)".

== Works ==
- The King's Servants. The Civil Service of Charles I, 1961 ISBN 9780710010377
- The State's Servants. The Civil Service of the English Republic, 1649-1660, 1973. ISBN 978-0-7100-7637-3
- The Struggle for the Constitution 1603-88, 1963. 4th ed, 1975. ISBN 9780713706895
- (ed.) The Interregnum: the Quest for Settlement, 1972 ISBN 9780333003091
- The Levellers in the English Revolution, 1975. ISBN 978-0-8014-0957-8
- (ed. as microfilm edition) The Clarke Manuscripts at Worcester College, Oxford, 1979
- (with John Morrill), The Civil War and Interregnum: Sources for Local Historians, 1979 ISBN 9780719909672
- Rebellion or Revolution? England 1640-1660, 1986 ISBN 9780192191793
- The Crown's Servants: Government and Civil Service under Charles II 1660-85, 2002. ISBN 978-0-19-820826-6

Aylmer's publications up to 1990 are listed in his Festschrift.

Academic offices
Preceded by J. C. Holt	President of the Royal Historical Society; 1985–1989	Succeeded by Francis Michael Longstreth Thompson
