= Cecil Brooke-Short =

English cricketer and Royal Navy officer

Personal information
- Full name: Cecil Brooke-Short
- Born: 18 December 1894; Trinidad
- Died: 28 June 1937 (aged 42); Liugong Island, Weihaiwei, Republic of China
- Batting: Unknown

Career statistics
Competition	First-class
Matches	1
Runs scored	4
Batting average	4.00
100s/50s	–/–
Top score	3*
Catches/stumpings	–/–
- Source: Cricinfo, 23 December 2019

Cecil Brooke-Short (18 December 1894 – 28 June 1937) was an English first-class cricketer and Royal Navy officer.

Born in Trinidad, Brooke-Short was commissioned into the Royal Marines as a second lieutenant in October 1913. He served in the Marines in the First World War, during which he was granted the temporary rank of lieutenant in October 1914, with confirmation of the full rank coming in October 1916. He was then promoted to the rank of captain in October 1917. After the war, Brooke-Short was placed on half-pay in September 1919, while holding a special appointment, before returning to the establishment in December 1921. He made a single appearance in first-class cricket for the Royal Navy against the British Army cricket team at Lord's in 1925. Batting twice in the match, he was dismissed for a single run in the Royal Navy first-innings by Adrian Gore, while in their second-innings he was unbeaten on 3 runs. He was later promoted to the rank of major in November 1931, before dying in June 1937 at the Liugong Island Royal Navy base in China.
