= Harold Evans (cricketer) =

English cricketer and Royal Navy officer

Personal information
- Full name: Harold Ernest Evans
- Born: 20 October 1891; Hampstead, Middlesex, England
- Died: 24 September 1980 (aged 88); Crowthorne, Berkshire, England
- Batting: Unknown

Career statistics
Competition	First-class
Matches	1
Runs scored	5
Batting average	2.50
100s/50s	–/–
Top score	3
Catches/stumpings	1/–
- Source: Cricinfo, 21 September 2019

Harold Ernest Evans OBE (20 October 1891 – 24 September 1980) was an English first-class cricketer and Royal Navy officer.

Evans was born at Hampstead in October 1891. After enlisting in the Royal Navy, he was promoted from the rank of midshipman to sub lieutenant in August 1912. He served in the Royal Navy during the First World War, with Evans being promoted to the rank of lieutenant in the first month of the war. Following the war, he made an OBE in August 1919 for valuable services during the war aboard HMS Renown. He made a single appearance in first-class cricket for the Royal Navy against Cambridge University at Fenner's in 1920. Batting twice in the match, he was dismissed for 2 runs in the Royal Navy first-innings by Charles Marriott, while in their second-innings he was dismissed for 3 runs by Clement Gibson. He was promoted to the rank of lieutenant commander in August 1922. Evans died at Crowthorne in September 1980.
