= Saint-Médard-de-Guizières =

- Commune
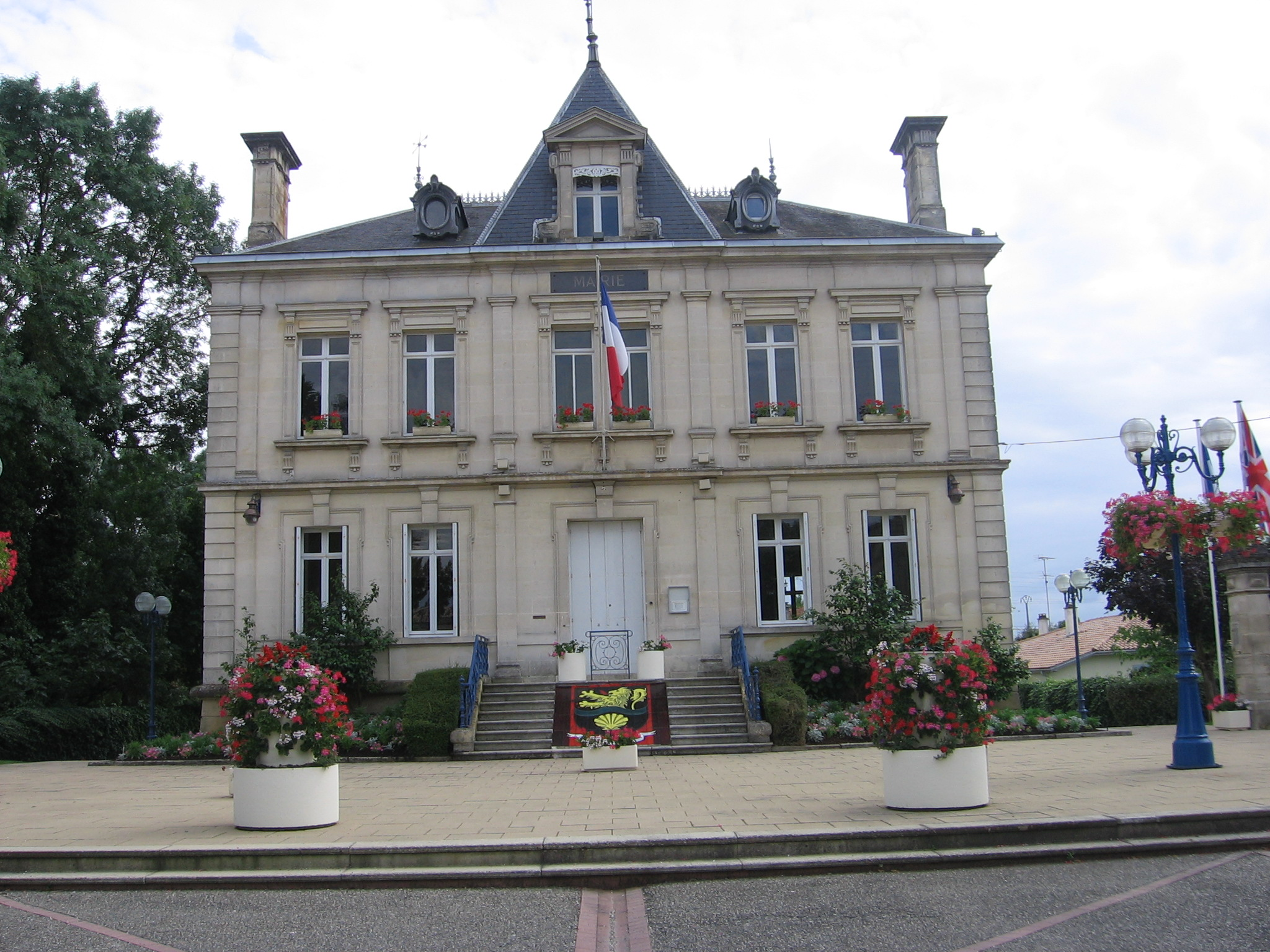
- The town hall in Saint-Médard-de-Guizières

- Coat of arms
- Location of Saint-Médard-de-Guizières
- Location within France Location within Nouvelle-Aquitaine
- Coordinates: 45°00′58″N 0°03′28″W
- Country: France
- Region: Nouvelle-Aquitaine
- Department: Gironde
- Arrondissement: Libourne
- Canton: Le Nord-Libournais
- Intercommunality: CA Libournais

Government
  - Mayor (2025–2026): Stéphane Catalan
- Area^{1}: 10.37 km^{2} (4.00 sq mi)
- Elevation: 16 m (52 ft)
- Highest elevation: 67 m (220 ft)
- Lowest elevation: 8 m (26 ft)
- Population (2023): 2,438
  - Density: 235.1/km^{2} (608.9/sq mi)
- Time zone: UTC+01:00 (CET)
  - Summer (DST): UTC+02:00 (CEST)
- INSEE/Postal code: 33447 /33230
- ^{1} French Land Register data, which excludes lakes, ponds, glaciers > 1 km^{2} (0.386 sq mi or 247 acres) and river estuaries.

Saint-Médard-de-Guizières (French pronunciation: [sɛ̃ medaʁ də ɡizjɛʁ]) is a commune in the Gironde department, region of Nouvelle-Aquitaine, southwestern France. It has been twinned with the village of Wedmore, England since 1975. Saint-Médard-de-Guizières station has rail connections to Bordeaux, Périgueux, Brive-la-Gaillarde and Limoges.

== Population ==
Historical population
Year	Pop.	±% p.a.
1968	1,737	—
1975	1,828	+0.73%
1982	1,935	+0.82%
1990	1,897	−0.25%
1999	2,106	+1.17%
2007	2,212	+0.62%
2012	2,394	+1.59%
2017	2,380	−0.12%
2023	2,438	+0.40%
Source: INSEE

== See also ==
- Communes of the Gironde department
