= John Griffiths (cricketer, born 1931) =

English cricketer

John Vesey Claude Griffiths (19 January 1931 – 18 February 1982) played first-class cricket for Gloucestershire from 1952 to 1957.

Griffiths was born in Lee, London. A lower-order left-handed batsman and a slow left-arm spin bowler, he played in 34 matches without ever establishing himself as a regular in the Gloucestershire first team. His most productive season was 1953, when he played in 13 matches and made his highest score, 32 against Combined Services. But in those 13 matches he took only 16 wickets.

Competing for a place in a Gloucestershire side that already boasted a Test slow left-armer in Sam Cook and future Test offbreak bowlers in John Mortimore and David Allen, plus the irrepressible Bryan Wells, Griffiths' opportunities got fewer rather than greater across the mid-1950s. His best bowling figures were four-wicket hauls in matches against university sides in 1955 and 1956, with four for 74 the best.

Griffiths played Minor Counties cricket for Gloucestershire as early as 1948 and played on through the 1958 season, though his last first-class appearance was in 1957. In the early 1960s, he made occasional appearances for Somerset's second eleven, and appeared in one further match for Gloucestershire's second eleven too.

In the late 1970s, he was an umpire standing in Minor Counties and Second Eleven Championship matches and in 1979, he stood for one season as an umpire in first-class and List A matches, though he was not reappointed in 1980. He died at Wedmore, Somerset, aged 51.
