= Edmund Leach (British Army officer) =

British army officer (1836–1923)

Major-General Sir Edmund Leach KCB
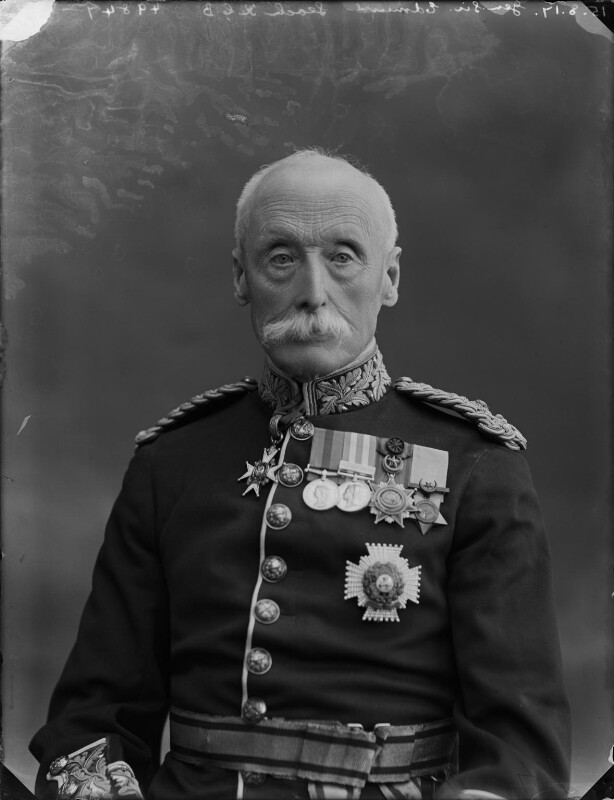
- Leach in 1917
- Born: 28 November 1836; Robeston Wathen, Pembrokeshire, Wales
- Died: 7 August 1923 (aged 86) Bath, Somerset, England

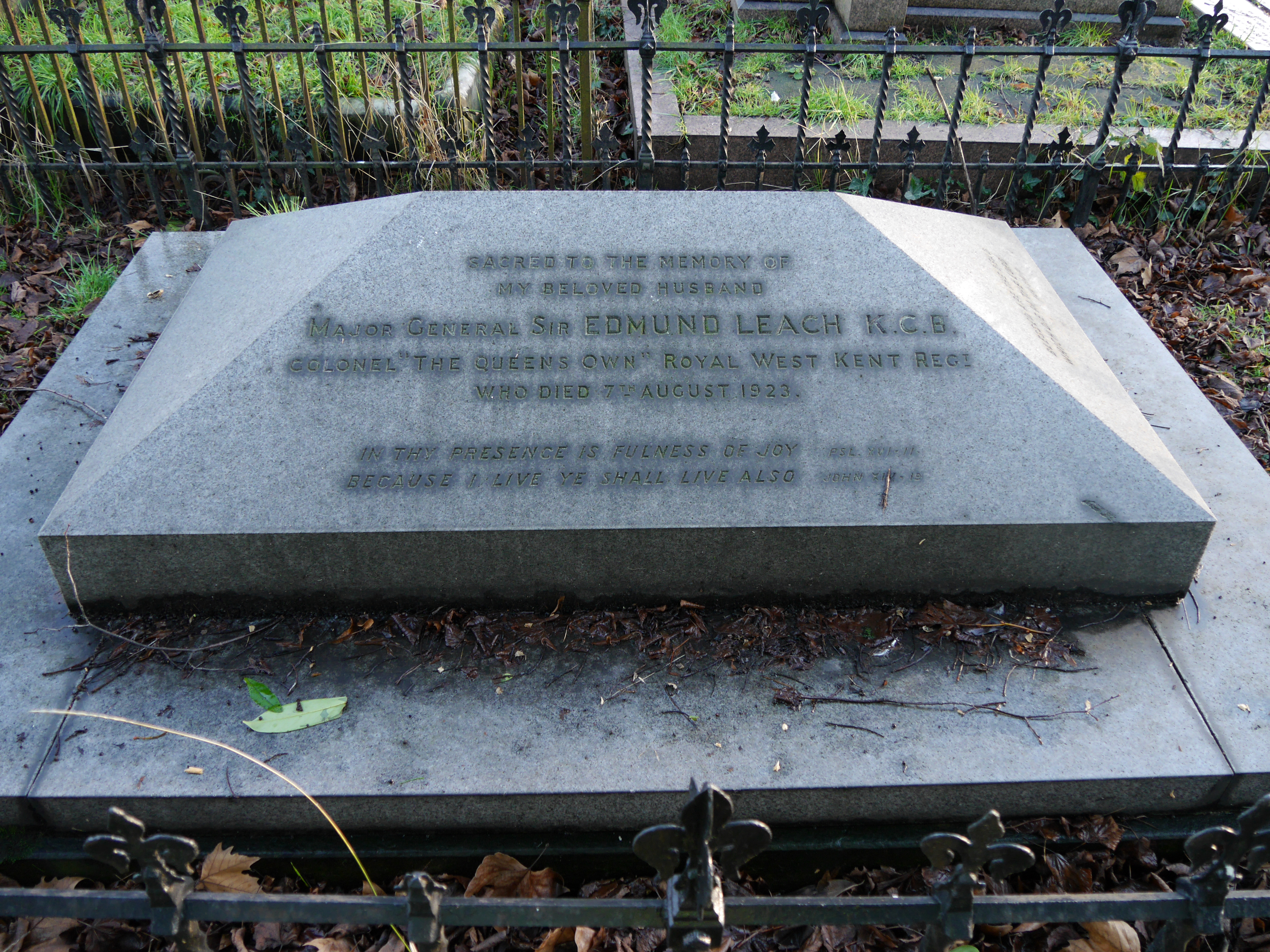
Tomb in Brompton Cemetery, London

Major-General Sir Edmund Leach KCB (28 November 1836 – 7 August 1923) was a British Army officer.

== Early life ==
Edmund Leach was born at Robeston Wathen, Pembrokeshire, Wales, on 28 November 1836, and educated at Sandhurst.

== Career ==
He started as an ensign in the 50th (Queen's Own) Regiment of Foot, and rose to become a major-general. He was raised to lieutenant-colonel in November 1883 and commanded a battalion of the regiment and was colonel of the Queen's Own (Royal West Kent Regiment) from 1904 to 1921. He was appointed KCB in the 1907 Birthday Honours.

He served in the Crimea and the New Zealand Wars (1863–1866). He was awarded the New Zealand War Medal.

== Personal life ==
He married Frances Elizabeth Ince at St. Saviour's, Chelsea on 29 April 1869 and had two sons:

- Brigadier-General Sir Henry Edmund Burleigh Leach CB CMG CVO (1870–1936)
- William Leach (1883–1969)

He lived at Corston House, Pembrokeshire, died at Bath and is buried in Brompton Cemetery, London, on the east side of the main entrance path from the north gate.
