= Charles Smith (cricketer, born 1898) =

English cricketer and Royal Marines officer

Personal information
- Full name: Charles Neville Strode Smith
- Born: 26 December 1898; Wedmore, Somerset, England
- Died: 9 September 1955 (aged 56); Instow, Devon, England
- Batting: Right-handed
- Role: Wicket-keeper

Domestic team information
- Years: Team
- 1931: Devon

Career statistics
| Competition | First-class |
|---|---|
| Matches | 1 |
| Runs scored | 54 |
| Batting average | 27.00 |
| 100s/50s | –/– |
| Top score | 47 |
| Catches/stumpings | –/– |
- Source: Cricinfo, 1 December 2019

Charles Neville Strode Smith (26 December 1898 – 9 September 1955) was an English first-class cricketer and Royal Marines officer who served in both World War I and II.

Born at Wedmore, Somerset in December 1898, Smith was commissioned into the Royal Marines as a probationary second lieutenant during the First World War in August 1916. He was promoted to the temporary rank of lieutenant the following September, with Smith granted the full rank following the war in September 1919. Having spent eight years as a lieutenant, he was promoted to the rank of captain in September 1927. Smith made a single appearance in first-class cricket for the Royal Navy against the Marylebone Cricket Club at Chatham in 1929. Batting twice in the match, he was dismissed for 7 runs in the Navy first-innings by Sidney Martin, while in their second-innings he was run out for 47. Two years later he played minor counties cricket for Devon, making a single appearance in the 1931 Minor Counties Championship. He was made a brevet major in December 1932.

Smith later served with the Royal Marines during the Second World War, which saw him made an acting lieutenant colonel in May 1942. In 1943 he was involved in the formation of No. 47 (Royal Marine) Commando. Following the war he was placed on the retired list in January 1948, retaining the rank of major. After his retirement, he served for two years in the Territorial Army. Smith died in September 1955 at Instow, Devon.
