= Maurice Conde-Williams =

English cricketer and Royal Navy officer

Personal information
- Full name: Maurice Marcel Frederic Condé-Williams
- Born: 16 January 1885; England
- Died: 16 November 1967 (aged 82); Chelsea, London, England

Domestic team information
- Years: Team
- 1913–1923: Royal Navy
- 1911–1913: Devon

Career statistics
Competition	First-class
Matches	2
Runs scored	54
Batting average	13.50
100s/50s	–/–
Top score	30
Balls bowled	6
Wickets	–
Bowling average	–
5 wickets in innings	–
10 wickets in match	–
Best bowling	–
Catches/stumpings	2/–
- Source: Cricinfo, 21 March 2011

Maurice Marcel Frederic Condé-Williams OBE (16 January 1885 – 16 November 1967) was an English cricketer and Royal Navy officer who served with distinction in the First World War. He was educated at Brighton College, where in 1899 he played for the college cricket team. As a cricketer, his batting and bowling styles are unknown.

Condé-Williams was serving in the Royal Navy in 1908 aboard HMS Exmouth. He made his debut for Devon in the 1911 Minor Counties Championship against Dorset. He played for Devon from 1911 to 1913, representing them in 10 matches. He later made his first-class debut for the Royal Navy in 1913 against the Army. Condé-Williams served in the First World War, and following the conclusion of the war he was knighted with an OBE for his services as Secretary to Vice-Admiral Sir Sydney Fremantle. Condé-Williams held the temporary rank of Acting Paymaster-Commander and the permanent rank of Paymaster Lieutenant-Commander. He later played his second and final first-class match for the Royal Navy in 1923 against the Army. In his two first-class matches, he scored 54 runs at a batting average of 13.50, with a high score of 30.

He died in Chelsea, London, on 16 November 1967.
