= James Boyd (sportsman) =

Scottish cricketer, rugby union player, and Royal Navy officer

Personal information
- Full name: James Lawrence Boyd
- Born: 18 August 1891; Amoy, Fujian, China
- Died: 15 June 1930 (aged 38); Arosa, Graubünden, Switzerland

Career statistics
Competition	First-class
Matches	2
Runs scored	25
Batting average	8.33
100s/50s	0/0
Top score	10*
Balls bowled	60
Wickets	1
Bowling average	56.00
5 wickets in innings	0
10 wickets in match	0
Best bowling	1/30
Catches/stumpings	1/–
- Source: Cricinfo, 26 November 2019

Rugby union career
- Position: Fly-half
Amateur team(s)
Years	Team	Apps	(Points)
- United Services
Provincial / State sides
Years	Team	Apps	(Points)
1911	Anglo-Scots	1	(0)
International career
Years	Team	Apps	(Points)
1912	Scotland	2	(0)

James Lawrence Boyd DSC (18 August 1891 – 15 June 1930) was a Scottish first-class cricketer, rugby union international and Royal Navy officer.

== Rugby Union career ==
=== Amateur career ===
He played for United Services.

=== Provincial career ===
He played for Anglo-Scots on 23 December 1911.

=== International career ===
Boyd was selected to play rugby union for Scotland as a fly-half in 1912, making two Test appearances against England in the Five Nations Championship in March, and South Africa in November, with both matches played at Inverleith.

== Cricket career ==
In 1913 he made a single appearance in first-class cricket for the Royal Navy against the British Army cricket team at Lord's.

Following the war, he made a further first-class appearance for the Royal Navy against the Army at Lord's in 1919.

== Family ==
The son of Thomas Morgan Boyd, a Scottish tea merchant, Boyd was born in China at Amoy.

== Military career ==
He was educated in England at the Royal Naval College, Osborne from where he entered into the Royal Navy as a sub-lieutenant. In 1913, he was promoted to the rank of lieutenant.

Boyd served with the navy in the First World War, during which he was awarded the Distinguished Service Cross in October 1916 in recognition of his service aboard submarines.

He was promoted to the rank of lieutenant commander in April 1921, with promotion to the rank of commander following in June 1926. He was placed on the retired list in February 1930, on account of ill health.

== Death ==
Boyd died shortly after retiring, in June 1930, at Arosa in Switzerland.
