= Charles Lewin =

British Royal Navy officer and cricketer

Rear-Admiral Charles Lewin
- Born: Charles la Primaudaye Lewin; 22 August 1874; Greenwich, London
- Died: 14 September 1952 (aged 78); Saint Helier, Jersey
- Military career
- Allegiance: United Kingdom
- Branch: Royal Navy
- Service years: 15 July 1888
- Rank: Lieutenant: 1 Oct 1896; Commander: 30 June 1908; Captain: 31 Dec 1914; Rear-Admiral: 24 Nov 1925
- Commands: HMS Princess
- Conflicts: World War I: Battle of Saadani

Rear-Admiral Charles la Primaudaye Lewin (24 August 1874 – 14 September 1952) was a British rear admiral in the Royal Navy and an English cricketer. He was born in Greenwich, London.

== Navy career ==
Lewin entered service in the Royal Navy on 15 July 1888, some years prior to his first recorded appearance for the Royal Navy Cricket Club, which came in 1906. By 1917, with World War I in progress, Lewin was recorded as being a Captain, commanding the ship HMS Princess. One recorded battle in which he took part formed part of the East African Campaign and details of it were recorded in the London Gazette. The operation, carried out at the request of General Jan Smuts, involved the naval support of the British Empire forces during the operation. Lewin's ship was one of the naval taskforce which successfully supported the occupation of the coastal town of Mikindani. Several years after the war, on 24 November 1925, he was promoted by the Admiralty to the rank of Rear Admiral.

== Cricket career ==
Following the conclusion of the war, Lewin played a single first-class match for the Royal Navy against the Army in 1920, when he was 45 years old. In the Royal Navy first innings he scored 15 runs before being dismissed by Stanley Cornwallis and in their second innings he scored 37 before being dismissed by Montagu Burrows. He appeared in three other matches for the Royal Navy between 1906 and 1910, but these were not first-class fixtures. In the first of these, against Marylebone Cricket Club (MCC), he scored 139. Lewin also played for Devon in the 1920 Minor Counties Championship, making three appearances.

== Personal life ==
In 1914, Lewin married Ruth Dangar, the daughter of Australian politician and barrister Henry Cary Dangar and granddaughter of Henry Dangar. Lewin and his wife were mentioned in the This Week in Town section of the Sydney Morning Herald on 6 November 1947. The article mentions that Ruth's sister Mrs Hubert Gordon would be hosting an event in honour of her sister. It is known that he and his wife had two children: a son, Henry Gilbert Dangar, b. 9 December 1916, d. 11 September 1980 and a daughter, Peggy (Margaret), b. 11 March 1922, d. 21 April 2011. He died in Saint Helier, Jersey on 14 September 1952.
