= Eric Elstob =

English cricketer and Royal Navy officer

Personal information
- Full name: Eric Bramley Elstob
- Born: 2 August 1885; Brentford, Middlesex, England
- Died: 15 May 1949 (aged 63); Hawkhurst, Kent, England
- Batting: Unknown
- Bowling: Unknown

Career statistics
Competition	First-class
Matches	2
Runs scored	23
Batting average	7.66
100s/50s	–/–
Top score	14
Balls bowled	102
Wickets	2
Bowling average	23.00
5 wickets in innings	0
10 wickets in match	0
Best bowling	1/5
Catches/stumpings	–/–
- Source: Cricinfo, 13 December 2019

Eric Bramley Elstob OBE (2 August 1885 – 15 May 1949) was an English first-class cricketer and Royal Navy officer.

The son of John George Elstob and Frances Alice Elstob, he was born at Brentford in August 1885. He was educated at Marlborough College. Elstob's career with the Royal Navy began as a clerk at The Admiralty, with him promoted to assistant paymaster in August 1906. He made his debut in first-class cricket for the Royal Navy against the British Army cricket team at Lord's in 1913. He served with the navy during the First World War and was promoted to the rank of paymaster commander in August 1918. He was made an OBE in the 1919 Birthday Honours for services rendered while serving as secretary to Rear-Admiral Cecil Dampier.

Elstob later made a second and final first-class appearance for the Royal Navy against the British Army at Lord's in 1923. He returned to Marlborough College in 1933, alongside two other Old Marlburians who had served on the recently scrapped HMS Marlborough, where he presented the ship's bell to the college. He held the rank of paymaster commander by 1935, with promotion to the rank of paymaster captain coming in July of the same year. Elstob served in the first year of the Second World War, before being placed on the retired list in August 1940. He died at Hawkhurst in May 1949. His brother Wilfrith was posthumously awarded the Victoria Cross during the First World War.
