= Clement Glenister =

English cricketer and Royal Navy officer

Personal information
- Full name: Clement Edward Glenister
- Born: 23 July 1897; Watford, Hertfordshire, England
- Died: 24 May 1968 (aged 70); Bovingdon, Hertfordshire, England
- Batting: Right-handed
- Bowling: Right-arm slow

Career statistics
Competition	First-class
Matches	5
Runs scored	104
Batting average	11.55
100s/50s	–/–
Top score	49
Balls bowled	441
Wickets	9
Bowling average	27.22
5 wickets in innings	–
10 wickets in match	–
Best bowling	2/39
Catches/stumpings	1/–
- Source: Cricinfo, 17 September 2019

Clement Edward Glenister CBE (23 July 1897 – 24 May 1968) was an English first-class cricketer and Royal Navy officer.

Glenister was born at Watford in July 1897 and was educated at Berkhamsted School. He joined the Royal Navy in the latter stages of the First World War, based at the admiralty, and in December 1919 he gained the rank of paymaster sub-lieutenant, antedated to September 1917. Glenister played first-class cricket for the Royal Navy, making his debut against the British Army cricket team at Lord's in 1924. He played first-class cricket for the Royal Navy until 1929, making five appearances. He scored a total of 104 runs in his five matches, at an average of 11.55 and a high score of 49. With his right-arm slow bowling, he took 9 wickets at a bowling average of 27.22 and best figures of 2 for 39. He was promoted to the rank of paymaster lieutenant commander in September 1927, with promotion to the rank of paymaster commander coming in June 1935. Glenister served in the Second World War, shortly after which he was promoted to the rank of captain and made an OBE in the 1946 Birthday Honours. Five years later in the 1951 Birthday Honours, he was made an CBE. During his final months of service he served as aide-de-camp to Elizabeth II, before retiring from active service in September 1952. He died in May 1968 at Bovingdon, Hertfordshire.
