= Wedmore =

Village in Somerset, England

Coordinates: 51.226°N 2.810°W

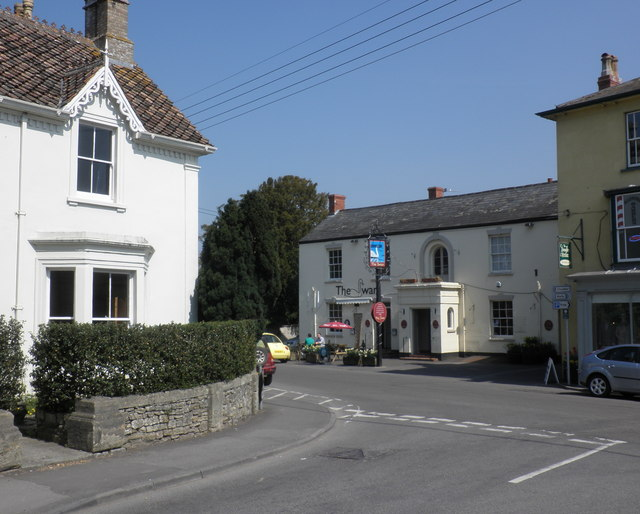
- The junction between Church Street and The Borough, in the centre of Wedmore

- Location within Somerset
- Population: 3,318 (2011)
- OS grid reference: ST4347
- Civil parish: Wedmore
- Unitary authority: Somerset Council
- Ceremonial county: Somerset
- Region: South West
- Country: England
- Sovereign state: United Kingdom
- Post town: WEDMORE
- Postcode district: BS28
- Dialling code: 01934
- Police: Avon and Somerset
- Fire: Devon and Somerset
- Ambulance: South Western
- UK Parliament: Wells and Mendip Hills

Wedmore is a large village and civil parish in the county of Somerset, England. It is situated on raised ground, in the Somerset Levels between the River Axe and River Brue, often called the Isle of Wedmore. The parish consists of three main villages: Wedmore, Blackford and Theale, with the 17 hamlets of Bagley, Blakeway, Clewer, Crickham, Cocklake, Heath House, Latcham, Little Ireland, Middle Stoughton, Mudgley, Panborough, Sand, Stoughton Cross, Washbrook, West End, West Ham and West Stoughton. The parish of Wedmore has a population of 3,318 according to the 2011 census.

Its facilities include a medical and dental practice, pharmacy, butcher's, a village store with off licence, three pubs, restaurant, café and several other local shops. It is 4 miles (6 km) south of Cheddar, 7 miles (11 km) west of the city of Wells and 7 miles (11 km) north west of Glastonbury.

== History ==
Iron Age remains have been found in the Wedmore area, and there are a number of Roman sites in the district.

The name Wedmore in Old English is thought to mean "hunting lodge" or "hunting moor" and there was a Saxon royal estate in the area. Centwine gained control of the area in 682 and named it 'Vadomaer' after one of the Saxon leaders, Vado the famous. After winning the Battle of Ethandun, Alfred the Great caused the Viking leader Guthrum and his followers to be baptised at Aller and then celebrated at Wedmore. After this the Vikings withdrew to East Anglia.

The Treaty of Wedmore is a term used by some historians inferred for the events in the Anglo-Saxon Chronicle, outlining how in 878 the Viking leader Guthrum was baptised and accepted Alfred the Great as his godfather. No such treaty still exists but there is a document that is not specifically linked to Wedmore that is a Treaty of Alfred and Guthrum. Alfred then left Wedmore in his will to his son Edward the Elder.

Wedmore was part of the hundred of Bempstone. Earthworks from a complex of buildings, including a hall and chapel, surrounded by a moat, have been identified. The site is believed to have been a bishop's palace demolished by John Harewel in the 1380s.

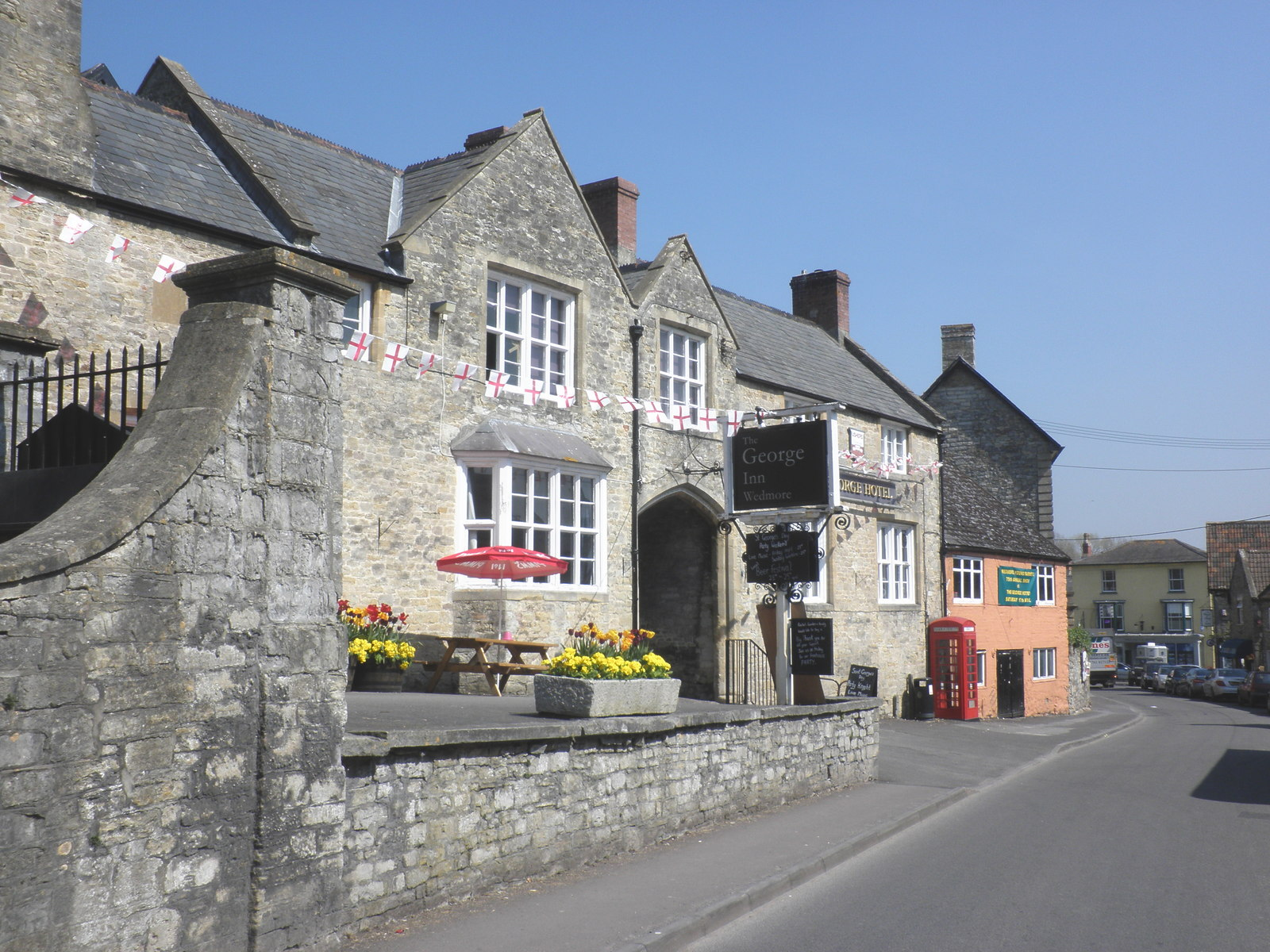
The George Inn

In 1853 a hoard of 200 silver coins dating from the Saxon period was found in the churchyard. In 1988 a Saxon ring, made of copper alloy with a unique knot design and dating from the 6th or 7th century, was found in the village by Tim Purnell. It has been authenticated by the British Museum and a modern copy made by local jeweller Erica Sharpe.

According to the 1086 Domesday Book, Wedmore/Wetmore was one of the holdings of the Bishop of Wells with 18 cottagers, woodlands, pasture and two fisheries.

In the medieval period, Wedmore was the centre for the surrounding agricultural area, with weekly markets as well as a larger annual one. The market cross dates from the 14th century.

In the 17th century Dr John Westover built a mental hospital to which patients came from all over the West Country. This is believed to have been England's first private lunatic asylum. The doctor is thought to have treated his patients compassionately, ensuring that they had luxuries such as playing cards and tobacco. He kept a record of the ailments of Wedmore people over a period of 15 years.

The original post office in Church Street opposite the church itself, dates from Georgian times, while the Old Vicarage was built at the end of the 15th century. The George Hotel was a 16th-century coaching inn. John Tonkin built a fashionable house, in the Italianate style, which is now the pharmacy.

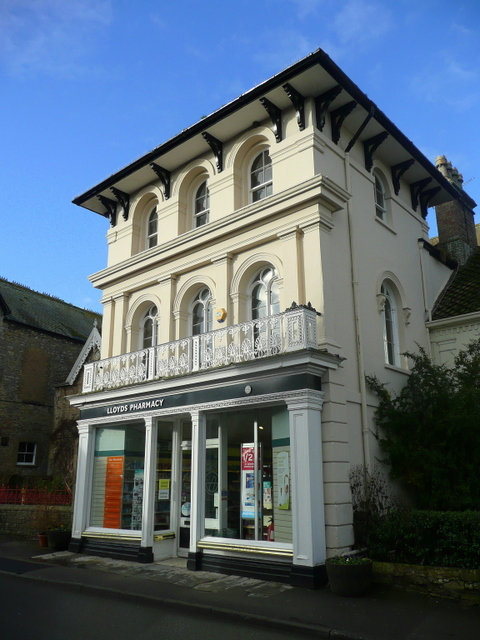
The pharmacy

In 1799 Hannah More established a Sunday school for children in Wedmore in the face of opposition from the vicar and local gentry.

Wedmore's market cross was moved roughly 100 yards along The Borough in the 1830s to allow widening of the high street.

Between 1881 and 1898 the Reverend Hervey produced the Wedmore Chronicle which gives a picture of the people and area at the time.

In late 2018, Strongvox Homes commissioned the development of 35 new houses to the east of Wedmore First School Academy on Blackford Road, with a completion date of early 2020. The scheme comes in the wake of a previous application to build 60 homes opposite the school and 18 opposite Westholme Farm, also on Blackford Road. The development plans were called "ludicrous" and "unnecessary" by residents concerned about the strain placed on infrastructure in the Wedmore region. Wedmore Parish Council supported the development, saying "The neighbourhood plan will provide an element of affordable housing, which is much-needed in the village."

== Governance ==
The parish council has responsibility for local issues, including setting an annual precept (local rate) to cover the council's operating costs and producing annual accounts for public scrutiny. The parish council evaluates local planning applications and works with the local police, district council officers, and neighbourhood watch groups on matters of crime, security, and traffic. The parish council's role includes initiating projects for the maintenance and repair of parish facilities, as well as consulting with the district council on the maintenance, repair, and improvement of highways, drainage, footpaths, public transport, and street cleaning. Conservation matters (including trees and listed buildings) and environmental issues are also the responsibility of the council.

For local government purposes, since 1 April 2023, the village comes under the unitary authority of Somerset Council. Prior to this, it was part of the non-metropolitan district of Sedgemoor, which was formed on 1 April 1974 under the Local Government Act 1972, having previously been part of Axbridge Rural District.

The village is in the Wedmore and Mark electoral ward. Although Wedmore is the most populous area, the ward stretches east to Mark. Wedmore is part of the UK Parliament constituency of Wells and Mendip Hills.

== International relations ==
Wedmore has been twinned with Saint-Médard-de-Guizières in Aquitaine, France, since 1975. A piece of public art was given as a gift to the people of Wedmore in 1995 by the citizens of Saint-Médard-de-Guizières, named the "Grape Press", to mark the twentieth anniversary of the twinning. The press is maintained by the Twinning Association and is part of the display that enabled the Wedmore in Bloom initiative achieve a Gold Award in 2009. In exchange, Wedmore gave the French town a British red phone box.

== Geography ==
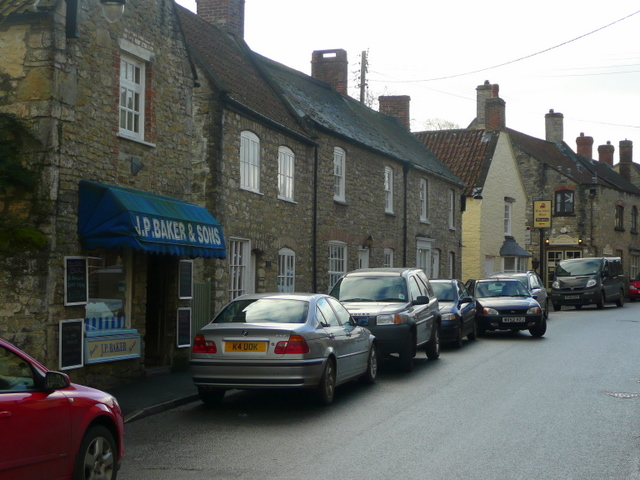
Church Street

Wedmore is situated on raised ground, in the Somerset Levels between the River Axe and River Brue, often called the Isle of Wedmore, which is composed of Blue Lias and marl.

South of Wedmore are the Tealham and Tadham Moors, a biological Site of Special Scientific Interest which form part of the extensive grazing marsh and ditch systems of the Somerset Levels and Moors. The water table is high throughout the greater part of the year with winter flooding occurring annually, by over-topping of the River Brue. 113 aquatic and bankside vascular plant species have been recorded from the field ditches, rhynes and deep arterial watercourses. A diverse invertebrate fauna is associated in particular with ditches that have a good submerged plant community. The water beetle fauna is exceptionally rich, with the nationally rare species Hydrophilus piceus and Hydrochara caraboides together with the rare soldier flies Stratiomys furcata and Odontomyia ornata. Good numbers of dragonflies and damselflies occur including the Hairy Dragonfly (Brachytron pratense) and the Variable Damselfly (Coenagrion pulchellum).

=== Climate ===
Along with the rest of South West England, Wedmore has a temperate climate which is generally wetter and milder than the rest of the country. The annual mean temperature is approximately 10 °C (50.0 °F). Seasonal temperature variation is less extreme than most of the United Kingdom because of the adjacent sea temperatures. The summer months of July and August are the warmest with mean daily maxima of approximately 21 °C (69.8 °F). In winter mean minimum temperatures of 1 °C (33.8 °F) or 2 °C (35.6 °F) are common. In the summer the Azores high pressure affects the south-west of England; however, convective cloud sometimes forms inland, reducing the number of hours of sunshine. Annual sunshine rates are slightly less than the regional average of 1,600 hours. In December 1998 there were 20 days without sun recorded at Yeovilton. Most of the rainfall in the south-west is caused by Atlantic depressions or by convection. Most of the rainfall in autumn and winter is caused by the Atlantic depressions, which is when they are most active. In summer, a large proportion of the rainfall is caused by sun heating the ground leading to convection and to showers and thunderstorms. Average rainfall is around 700 mm (28 in). About 8–15 days of snowfall is typical. November to March have the highest mean wind speeds, and June to August have the lightest winds. The predominant wind direction is from the south-west.

== Demography ==
The population of Wedmore, recorded in the 2011 census, is 3,318. Since Wedmore has a higher level of residents born in the UK than the national average and a lower rate of residents either born in other EU countries or outside the EU, it does not have a significant immigrant population.

== Education ==
The educational system in the Cheddar Valley consists of first schools for children between the ages of 4 and 9, two middle schools (ages 9 to 13) and a secondary school for pupils up to the age of 18 years.

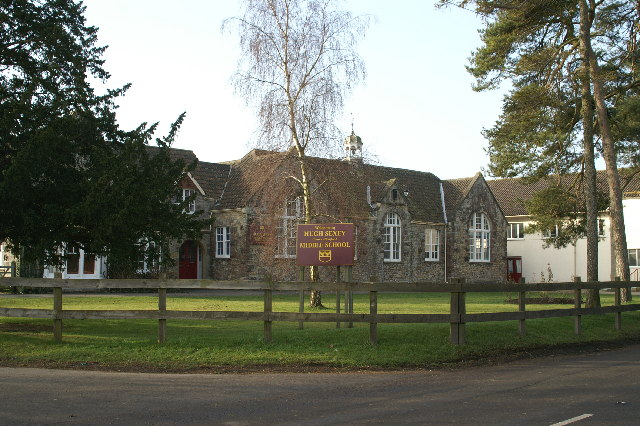
Hugh Sexey Middle School

Established in 1876 as Wedmore First School, and upgrading to academy status in July 2011, the first school built for Wedmore has 211 pupils, with a capacity of 210, aged from four to nine. On 1 September 2016, it became part of a multi-academy trust known as the Wessex Learning Trust. The trust comprises eight schools within the Cheddar Valley geographic area who together offer educational provision from ages 2–19.

Hugh Sexey is a middle school and specialist Technology College in Blackford named after royal auditor Hugh Sexey (1556–1619). The school had 620 pupils in June 2012, who join aged 9 in Year 5 and stay until age 13 in Year 8, after which they go to The Kings of Wessex Academy in Cheddar. Hugh Sexey is also a Wessex Learning Trust member.

I.T. for the Terrified was started in Wedmore in 1999, as a community project so that volunteers could share their computer skills with the local community in a user-friendly and informal setting. In 2001 it moved to the rear of The George Hotel, and in 2009 it moved to a converted cow barn in the grounds of The Kings of Wessex Academy in Cheddar.

Wedmore First School Academy is for students aged 4–9, with a nursery for children from age 2. It has a total capacity of 210 pupils and a current enrollment of 201.

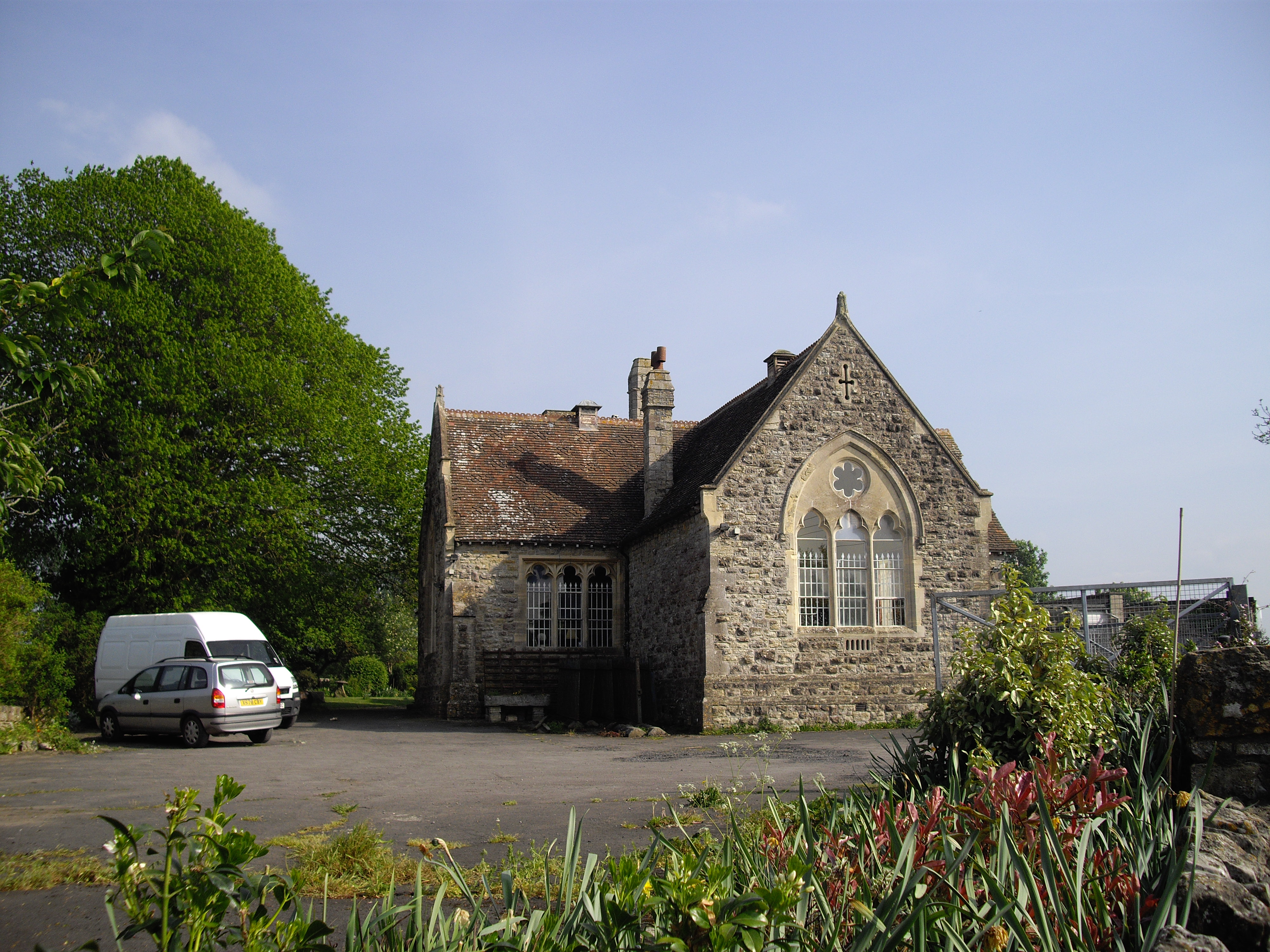
The 1876 building

The school was founded in 1876, moved to its present site in 1990, upgraded to academy status in 2011 and became part of the Wessex Learning Trust in 2016.

Wedmore First School was founded in 1876 on Cheddar Road, Wedmore, before moving to its current location. It became an academy, directly funded by central government, in 2011, and joined the Wessex Learning Trust group of schools in 2016.

In March 2017, former Somerset County Cricket Club wicketkeeper Jos Buttler opened four new £500,000 classrooms at the school, after the proposed expansion was greenlit by the Department for Education.

In July 2019, Avon and Somerset Police's Speed Enforcement Unit released details regarding mobile speed cameras outside the school.

| Name | Years in office | Notes |
|---|---|---|
| Royston Cann | | |
| Jackie Hipwell | 2001–2017 | |
| Denise Mawdsley | 2017–2022 | |
| Emma Tovey | 2022–2023 | |
| Shelley Kent | 2023–present | |

Jos Buttler, vice-captain of the England cricket team was a student.

== Transport ==
Historically, and apart from school services, Wedmore has been poorly served. The first regularly timed daily bus service began in the mid-1980—a regular service between Wells to the east and Burnham-on-Sea to the west. There is also a service between Glastonbury to the south-east and Shipham via Cheddar to the north.

=== Wedmore Community Bus ===
The Isle of Wedmore Rural Transport Association, known locally as the Wedmore Community Bus, consists of a voluntary committee which runs a community bus service in conjunction with Somerset County Council. Established in the late 1970s, it currently operates a return service from Wedmore to Bridgwater, Taunton, Glastonbury and Weston-super-Mare, each town being served on one day per week. Each service is timed to leave Wedmore at about 9:30 am, reaching Wedmore on the return in the early afternoon.Occasional services are also run to Cribbs Causeway shopping centre, near Bristol.

== Religious sites ==
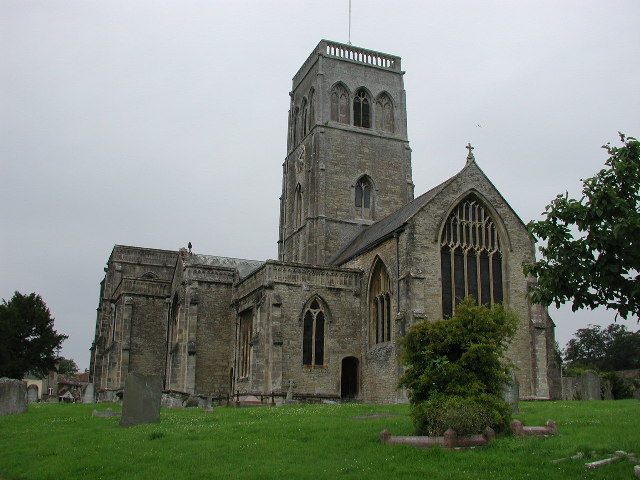
Church of St Mary

The Church of St Mary is predominantly from the 15th century, although some 12th- and 13th-century work survives. The tower, which was built around 1400, with its set-back buttresses, includes triple two-light bell chamber windows; those to the centre are louvred, those to each side blank. The gardens that surround the church are best viewed from the top of this tower. St Mary's Church is a Grade I listed building.

Wedmore Methodist Church, on Sand Road, was built in 1817 replacing an earlier chapel which was built in 1795 on the site of the present Village Hall. It is a Grade II listed building built of local Wedmore stone. The Sunday School Room was built in 1896 and the church was refurbished in 1901 when a porch was added. In 2008 the vestry was completely refurbished and new furniture installed.

Wedmore Baptist Church had been open since 1857 on Grants Lane, but closed to parishioners in March 2010 due to a limited number of people attending services. A church committee member put this down to an increase in numbers at the nearby Bagley Baptist Church, also in the Wedmore parish, which has livelier services that attract young people.

The village of Theale is served by Christ Church, built in 1826–28, and Blackford is served by Holy Trinity, built in 1821–23. Both churches were designed by Richard Carver.

== Culture ==
Wedmore has a number of annual festivals including the Arts Festival, a summer street fair, Wedmore by Lamplight street fair at Christmas, and a large Harvest Home and village parade on the playing field each year. Wedmore Playing Fields also offer sporting facilities for tennis, football, cricket and bowls.

Arts events are held at Wedmore Village Hall, both those produced locally and national tours. Wedmore Opera stages large-scale classic opera in a specially designed and constructed marquee venue and also in Wedmore Village Hall. The group were founded in 1988 "around a kitchen table" and to date have staged more than 60 performances of 18 productions. They recently performed Gilbert and Sullivan's Pirates of Penzance, and in 2018 they aim to stage Verdi's La Traviata to mark their 30th anniversary, as this was their first production. Wedmore Theatre is the longest standing arts organisation in Wedmore and has put on many productions over the past 40 years.

Local people created and host the original Turnip Prize, a parody of the Turner Prize. This competition (celebrating the worst of bad modern art) takes place annually at The New Inn.

There is an annual Wedmore Real Ale Festival in September.

== Notable residents ==
=== Sport ===
- Dickie Burrough (1909–1994), first-class cricketer, was born in Wedmore.
- William Burrough (1875–1939), first-class cricketer and father of Dickie Burrough, died in Wedmore.
- Jos Buttler (born 1990), Lancashire and England wicketkeeper, grew up in Wedmore.
- John Griffiths (1931–1982), first-class cricketer, died in Wedmore.
- Charles Smith (1898–1955), first-class cricketer and Royal Marines officer, was born in Wedmore.

=== Other ===
- Arthur Dalzell, 13th Earl of Carnwath (1851–1941), British Army officer and representative peer of Scotland, died at his country residence, Sand House.
- Penelope Fitzgerald (1916–2000), Booker prize-winning novelist, poet, essayist and biographer, was a weekend resident at Theale Post Office, c. 1981 – c. 1986.
- John Giles (1812–1867), Anglican priest, was born in Wedmore.
- Gary Glitter (born 1944), glam rock singer, owned a country home in Wedmore at the time of his arrest in 1997.
- Tessa Munt (born 1959), MP for Wells, 2010–2015, lives in Wedmore.
- Lyndon Smith (born 1964), academic, lives in Wedmore.
