= Demobilised Officers cricket team =

Cricket team of First World War veterans

The Demobilised Officers cricket team was a cricket team formed of first-class cricketers who had fought in the First World War and following its conclusion had been demobilised. The team played a single first-class match against a combined Army and Navy cricket team at Lord's in 1919. The eleven players who represented the team in the match were Richard Twining (later President of the Marylebone Cricket Club and Middlesex), Mordaunt Doll, Harry Altham, John Morrison, Gilbert Ashton, Claude Burton, Frank Mann, Stanley Saville, Eric Martin, Sidney Bollon and Wilfrid Lord. All except Bollon had previously played first-class cricket, with Mann the only member of the team to later play international cricket, making five Test appearances for England. The Army and Navy batted first, making 231 all out, with Bollon taking five wickets with figures of 5/59, while Ashton backed him up with 4/95. Responding in their first-innings, the Demobilised Officers made 212 all out, with Ashton top scoring in the innings with 95. The Army and Navy reached 124/2 in their second-innings, at which point the match was declared a draw. The team played no further matches after this.

== Bibliography ==
- A guide to first-class cricket matches played in the British Isles (second ed.). ACS. 1982.
