= HMS Pigmy =

Seven ships of the Royal Navy have been named Pigmy:

- HMS Pigmy (1781), a 14-gun cutter captured by the French on 27 December 1781. Recaptured on 22 July 1782. Renamed HMS Lurcher on 31 May 1783 and HMS Pigmy in July 1783. Pigmy wrecked on 16 December 1796 during the night in Bigbury Bay, Devon. When she started to break up Captain A. Pullibank permitted the crew to go ashore via a hawser. Pullibank, his son, and some 10 of her crew of 60 were lost. The subsequent court martial acquitted her officers and crew of the loss.
- HMS Pigmy (1782), the former 10-gun cutter HMS Ranger, renamed in 1782 and sold in 1784.
- HMS Pigmy (1798), the former French cutter Mutin, captured on 2 October 1779. Renamed HMS Mutine on entry into Royal Navy service. Renamed HMS Pigmy on 20 January 1798. Wrecked on 9 August 1805.
- HMS Pigmy, was the 16-gun cutter HMS Ranger (1806), renamed in 1806 and wrecked on 5 March 1807.
- HMS Pigmy (1810), a 10-gun cutter/schooner sold in 1823.
- HMS Pigmy (1837), a paddle steamer scrapped in 1879.
- HMS Pigmy (1888), a composite screw gunboat launched in 1888 and sold in 1905.
- HMS Pigmy (1940), a submarine depot ship
