= Kenneth Hunt (cricketer) =

English cricketer (1902–1971)

Personal information
- Born: 4 December 1902; Bristol, England
- Died: 16 March 1971 (aged 68); Stroud, Gloucestershire, England
- Batting: Right-handed
- Role: Batsman

Domestic team information
- Years: Team
- 1926: Gloucestershire

Career statistics
Competition	FC
Matches	2
Runs scored	11
Batting average	2.75
100s/50s	0/0
Top score	7
Balls bowled
Wickets
Bowling average
5 wickets in innings
10 wickets in match
Best bowling
Catches/stumpings	2/0
- Source: Cricinfo, 4 August 2013

Kenneth Hunt (4 December 1902 – 16 March 1971) was an English cricketer. He played two first-class matches, one for the Royal Navy in 1925 and one for Gloucestershire between in 1926.
