= Edward Sinclair (cricketer) =

English cricketer and Royal Navy officer

Personal information
- Full name: Edward Wortley Sinclair
- Born: 4 January 1889; Paddington, London, England
- Died: 22 December 1966 (aged 77); Orpington, Kent, England
- Batting: Right-handed
- Bowling: Right-arm medium

Career statistics
Competition	First-class
Matches	3
Runs scored	23
Batting average	4.60
100s/50s	–/–
Top score	19
Balls bowled	498
Wickets	9
Bowling average	34.44
5 wickets in innings	–
10 wickets in match	–
Best bowling	4/162
Catches/stumpings	1/–
- Source: Cricinfo, 25 December 2019

Edward Wortley Sinclair (4 January 1889 – 22 December 1966) was an English first-class cricketer and Royal Navy officer.

Born at Paddington in January 1889, Sinclair was commissioned into the Royal Navy as a sub-lieutenant in March 1908. He was promoted to lieutenant in September 1909. Sinclair made his debut in first-class cricket for the Royal Navy Cricket Club against the British Army cricket team at Lord's in 1913. He served in the First World War, during which he was promoted to lieutenant commander in September 1917. Following the war, he made two further first-class appearances for the Royal Navy in 1919, against Cambridge University and the British Army. Playing as a right-arm medium pace bowler, he took a total of 9 wickets in his three matches, with best figures of 4 for 162. He was placed on the retired list at his own request in April 1931, at which point he was granted the rank of commander. Sinclair died at Orpington in December 1966.
