= Turnip Prize =

Spoof UK award satirising the Tate Gallery's Turner Prize

- Description: A spoof award satirising the Turner Prize for deliberately bad modern art
- Country: United Kingdom
- Presented by: The New Inn, Wedmore
- Reward: A turnip nailed to a block of wood
- Website: www.theisleofwedmore.net

The Turnip Prize is a spoof UK award satirising the Tate Gallery's Turner Prize by rewarding deliberately bad modern art. It was started as a joke in 1999, but gained national media attention and inspired similar prizes. Credit is given for entries containing bad puns as titles, displaying "lack of effort" or "is it shit?" Conversely, entries with "too much effort" or "not shit enough" are immediately disqualified. The first prize is a turnip nailed to a block of wood. The exhibition runs for roughly six weeks from 1 November and prizegiving takes place in the first week in December. It is currently held at The New Inn, Wedmore, Somerset.

== History ==
The prize was conceived in 1999 by management and regulars of The George Hotel, Wedmore, Somerset, after the exhibition of Tracey Emin's My Bed was shortlisted for the Turner Prize. It is owned and organised by Trevor Prideaux and was announced thus: "The Turnip Prize is a crap art competition ... You can enter anything you like, but it must be rubbish." The competition is based on the supposition, "We know it's rubbish, but is it art?" Competitors submitted entries of ridiculous objects posing as contemporary art, mostly made from junk titled with spoofs or puns. The prize is a turnip impaled on a rusty six-inch nail.

In May 2000, the nominees appeared on the BBC TV Esther show, presented by Esther Rantzen and featured by national and international media.

In 2001, the competition was held in the public conveniences in Wedmore.

In 2002, the "Monster Raving Loony Party" attempted to hijack the competition at The Trotter, Crickham, Wedmore.

In 2003, the prize moved to the New Inn, Wedmore. The winner was James Timms with Take a Leaf out of My Chook, an exhibit of a raw chicken stuffed with leaves. James Timms subsequently appeared on BBC Radio Scotland's Fred MacAulay Show with Ed Byrne.

In 2005, Ian Osenthroat, a 69-year-old former photocopier salesman, won with the exhibit Birds Flew, a bird's nest with a flu remedy box. He commented "I have entered this most coveted art award on several occasions and I really feel that the lack of effort this year has really paid off."

The 2006 winner was Ian Lewis with the exhibit Torn Beef, an empty corned beef can. He stated, "The work took no time at all to create." Trevor Prideaux commented, "I believe that over the last seven years the bad artists of Wedmore and surrounding areas have created far better works than Nicholas Serota and The Tate Britain Gallery could ever wish to exhibit." Also in 2006, the BBC's Chief Somerset Correspondent, Clinton Rogers, was immortalised as Clint on a Row of Jars.

In 2007, the competition gained more publicity with the entry of artwork with the title By the Banksea. The painting bears a resemblance to work by the Bristol graffiti artist Banksy, and its origins are likewise a secret. By the Banksea portrays a seaside Aunt Sally in the form of a stencil of the Mona Lisa, but in Banksy style, Mona Lisa is depicted holding a rocket launcher firing a turnip over the wreckage of a seaside pier and an emergency exit sign. Competition organiser Trevor Prideaux commented: "It does seem to be in Banksy's style. But someone has thought too much about this one and tried too hard. So for that reason it's not likely to win." The piece was duly disqualified for "too much effort, and not shit enough." The 2007 competition was won by Bracey Vermin with Tea P, a group of used tea bags in the shape of a letter P.

Competition entries for 2010 included "Ivor Crush"'s clothes hanger linking the letter U in "Crush", entitled Hung up on You, and an entry by Banksy, which focused on the recent student protests of the day.

Entries for 2011 included a piece of cheese carved into the letter E, entitled CheeseE, A fish full of dollars, and an exhibit of an Action Man toy – called First Class Mail – with a carefully placed stamp, and a coloured rock called Half a Stone Lighter. This year's prize featured on the BBC's Have I Got News For You for two weeks running.

== Winners and shortlisted artists ==
- 1999 – David Stone (baker), winner – Alfred The Grate (two burned rolls on a fire grate)
  - David Gannon (British Airways worker) – Sharp Infested Waters (a jar of water filled with needles, razors and knives)
  - Neil Ellis – Soiled Serviette (a comment on a crumpled piece of paper)
  - Iain Jones – Half Cut (a saw and a piece of wood cut halfway through with a bottle of beer nearby)
  - Maureen Hodge (pub landlady) – Laundry Day Tracey (a neat pile of clean sheets)
- 2000 – Jacqui Redman (care worker, age 30), winner – Minstrel Cycle (a bicycle constructed of sweets, cocktail sticks and tampons)
  - Jenny Vining (midwife, age 21+) – Cereal Killer (cereal packets with bullet holes in them)
  - Kerry Bobbett (trainee graphic designer, age 19) – Wind In The Willows (a tin of beans in a wicker basket)
  - Sue Smith (age 50+) – Surf In The Net (a box of washing powder in a net)
- 2001 – Chloe Wilson, winner – nothing (which was literally nothing)
- 2002 – Jenny Vining (midwife), winner – Piston Broke (a broken piston mounted onto a block of wood)
  - Dick Stelling (landlord, age 69) – A Bit on the Side (a horse's bit on its side)
  - James Timms (trapeze artist) – Privot Investigator (a privet bush and magnifying glass)
- 2003 – James Timms (long-distance unicyclist, age 26), winner – Take a Leaf out of my Chook (a raw chicken stuffed with leaves)
  - Di Vorce – Bitter and Twisted (a piece of grapefruit peel)
  - Jonny Wilkinson – Jonny Wilkinson (a condom and a razor blade)
  - Polly Ethylene – What a Waste (a sculpture of plumbing pipes)
- 2004 – Pearl E Queen (former chimney sweep, age 99), winner – Jellied Deal (a jelly with a hand of playing cards set into it)
  - Alan Kieda – Camp X Ray (a collage of camp images), disqualified
  - Claire Prior – Half a Stone Lighter
  - Ian Lewis – Light Lunch (a sculpture using china, paper, steel and glass)
- 2005 – Ian Osenthroat (former photocopier salesman, age 69), winner – Birds Flew (an empty birds' nest with a flu remedy)
  - Ian Lewis – Political Promises (an empty jar)
  - The Mysterious Baker – Half Baked (baked bread in the shape of ½)
  - Robert Baby – Leakin' Wellington (a leek protruding from a Wellington boot)
  - The Sisters Incognito – The Hand of Time (a papier-mâché sculpture of a clock face)
- 2006 – Ian Lewis (Iron Man), winner – Torn Beef (an empty corned beef can)
  - Ham Sweet Ham (disqualified) (a framed picture containing two slices of ham and a boiled sweet)
  - Beyond the Pale
  - Captain's Log
  - Clinton Rogers (BBC's Chief Somerset Correspondent) – Clint on a Row of Jars
  - Cracked Pot (a broken plant pot)
  - Medium Steak (a medium-sized wooden stake)
  - The Second Coming
- 2007 – Bracey Vermin (jam maker), winner – Tea P (used tea bags in the shape of a P)
  - Mary Leftley, very highly commended – Thyme Flies (dead flies in a hexagonal jar with thyme)
  - Mr Fezzy Wig, very highly commended – Pair o' dice Lost (a map of Scotland with dice)
  - John Squires, very highly commended – Mints Meet (a mincemeat jar containing a polo mint and an extra strong mint)
  - Isaac Hasumoff – Fly in Saucer (a saucer with a dead fly), 2007 Special Award. "Judges considered that this was an exceptional lack of effort. However, the fly cannot be considered rubbish (it is not recyclable unless ingested by a spider)."
- 2008 – Ivor Pranced (farmer), winner – Fleeced (a piece of sheep's wool depicting John Sergeant)
- 2009 – Frank Van Bough (sports presenter), winner – Manhole Cover (a pair of white Y-fronts)
  - Clinton Rogers – Croc of Gold (a Croc shoe painted gold)
  - Bjorn Toolate – The Swinging Six Teas (a coat-hanger with six tea bags hanging from it)
  - Sue Shi – Knickless Cage (a wire cage containing naked Barbie dolls)
  - Mary Christmas – Noddy Holder (a Noddy bucket)
  - Aunt Sponge – Shi Tart (a tart with the letters SHI in it)
- 2010 – Doug Pitt (gold digger), winner – Chilli 'n' Minors (one large chilli and three smaller chillies)
  - Aunt Sponge – Elfin Safety (a builders' hard hat with elf ears on it)
  - Gill Adams – It's Marge (I Can't Believe It's Not Butter! container with Marge Simpson in it)
  - Jo Hill – Polish Worker (a duster or cleaning cloth)
  - New Blood – A Leg Up (an old table leg stood on its end)
  - Sarah Quick – Brief Encounter (an abacus with a pair of pants over it)
- 2011 – Jim Drew (bush trimmer), winner – Jamming with Muddy Waters (a jar containing jam and some muddy water)
  - Granny Abuse – Fish Full of Dollars (a fish stuffed full of dollars)
  - Mr Fezziwig – Half a Stone Lighter (a stone with one half lighter in colour than the other side)
  - Aunt Sponge – Children in Mead (a bottle of mead with many dolls in it)
  - Andy Gould – CheesE (a piece of cheese cut into an "E" shape)
  - Team GB – First Class Mail (an Action Man toy with a first-class stamp placed over his penis)
- 2012 – Miss Quick (midwife), winner – The Three Tenors (a pack of Lady Tenas with three sticking out)
  - Andy Robinson – A Limpet Torch (a torch with limpets attached to it)
  - Asif – Arab Spring (a large spring dressed as an Arab)
  - Kelly Jones – S'not Art (a crumpled tissue)
  - Harold Stone – Stone He Broke (a stone broken in two)
  - James Standon – Bread in Captivity (a loaf of bread in a pet-carrying cage)
  - Mike Atkinson – Children in Knead (a lump of dough with children in it)
- 2013 – Percy Long-Prong (former chauffeur), winner – Play on Words (a Shakespeare play on top of a dictionary)
  - Chris McKinley – Slightly Open (a jar)
  - Hugh Grant – Brookes Hair Hacked (a pile of red wood shavings)
  - Tony Edmunds – Flower Power (a flower and a battery)
  - Cobbsy – The Hobbit (a ring off the top of a cooker)
  - Guido Barbato – Smarty Pants (pants coming out of a Smarties tube)
- 2014 – Ms Drunken Shepherd (shepherdess), winner – Ewe Kip (a sleeping sheep)
  - Abby – Gogglebox (an empty box of goggles)
  - Leafy – Pensive (a pen and a sieve)
  - Aunt Sponge – Stick another Shrimp on the Barbie (Barbie doll with shrimps stuck on it)
  - Trees R Green – Ginger Nut (a walnut with ginger hair)
  - Mike Anderson – Breast in Plant (breasts embedded in a plant)
- 2015 – Bonksy (rocket scientist), winner – Dismal And (the symbol "&" looking dismal)
  - P.Enfold – Danger Mouse (a computer mouse with an electrical warning sticker on it)
  - Art Ist – Staple Diet (a galvanised staple on a plate)
  - Asif – A Clean Slate (a piece of slate with nothing on it)
  - Pat McGroin – Hung like a Donkey (a donkey hanging on a rope)
  - Imogen Crees – A Roll in the Hay (a bread roll in some hay)
- 2016 – Plumsky (sommelier) – Pole Dark (a black pole)
  - Sovereign Steve – Bricks It (three red bricks arranged as the letters IT)
  - Hair Minge – Labour Party (a Barbie doll giving birth to a party blower)
  - E.B.Trumped – Oh Baaah Ma Leaves (two sheep and some leaves)
  - Willy Dropum – Pair of Drawers (a pair of drawers from a bureau)
  - Kick Ass O – The European Single Meerkat (a lone meerkat holding a European flag)
- 2017 – Chris P. Bacon (Year 8 student) – Pulled Pork (a tractor pulling a pig)
  - Sue D'onim – Fake Nudes (Barbie and Ken naked and holding hands)
  - Tiger Would – Minnie Driver (a small golf club)
  - Keepthefaith – Northern Soul (a shoe with a compass on its sole)
  - Lady (Sheila) Critters – Pant & Dec (a pair of pants with playing cards on top)
  - N Eedl Ife – Pornhub (internet hub with a chess pawn on top)
- 2018 – Stroke Me (lavatory attendant) – Collywobbles (a plastic collie dog on a jelly)
  - Claire Brown – Stock Pile (a pile of stock cubes)
  - C Tinder – Hot Date (a chilli pepper and a date)
  - Mrs Heinz – Trump Tower (two tins of baked beans stacked on top of one another)
  - Ray Cycle – Plastic Waste (a plastic belt)
  - Annabel Stone – Hollywood (a piece of holly and a piece of wood)
- 2019 – Fanny Scorcher (hairdresser) – Bush Fire Down Under (a pair of knickers with a burnt hole in the front)
  - Canna B. Bothered – A Complete Waste of Thyme (the herb thyme discarded from its jar)
  - Will Ted Gutful – Lettuce Leaf or Romaine (a romaine lettuce leaf)
  - Henry Yolking – Poached Eggs (an empty egg box)
  - David Ehmann – The Leaves and the Remains (a pile of leaves and bones)
  - Asif – Thomas Cooked (Thomas the Tank Engine in a saucepan)
- 2020 – Herewe Goagain (gardening girl) – Lockdown (a padlock on top of a pile of duck down feathers)
  - Robin Deadrest – A Brush with Death (a robin laid on its back next to a paintbrush)
  - Pete Lamb – Back to the Fuchsia (a baby doll with its back to a fuchsia plant)
  - Jolly Roger – Fur Load (a large bundle of fur)
  - The Very Reverent Canon Ball – Rock on Tommy (a rock on top of a tomato)
  - Doug Tunn – Shut the Duck Up (a duck with gaffer tape over its beak)
- 2021 – Ching Ching Pi Pi Ee (architect) – Panda Mick (a panda called Mick)
  - Concerned – Glowball Warming (a glow ball on top of a hot water bottle)
  - Raspberry Buttocks – Green Energy (a green battery)
  - U Naughty Royal – Prints Andrew (a mannequin with two handprints strategically placed on it)
- 2022 – Lie Instate (Soho cinema projectionist and comedian) – Cue Jumpers (a pool cue with two small jumpers attached)
  - .Gov – Red Tape (a roll of red insulation tape)
  - Charlie King – RIP Elizabeth the 2nd (a torn 2nd-class stamp)
  - Ivor Bolshoi Liebherr – Ukraine (a yellow crane holding a sprig of a yew tree)
- 2023 – Mr Keep Calm (government employee) – Party Gate (a gate with a party hat on top of it)
  - G.P.T Chat Esq – A Eye (an artificial eye ball)
  - Chicking the Third of Somerset – Coronation Chicken (a KFC carton with a crown on top)
  - Ike Price – Inflation (an inflated balloon and pump)
- 2024 – Wonga Woman (teacher) – Tax in Creases (a crumpled shirt with tacks sprinkled into the creases)
  - Revd Paula F U Jitsu – Post Office Sandal (a red flip-flop)
  - Tim Burr – Sycamore Gap (two sycamore seeds placed apart)
  - Mrs Penny Saver – Inflation (an inflated balloon)
- 2025 – Ali Can (a retired world-renowned cyclo-cross specialist) – Bitter n Twisted (a twisted can of Moor Beer Company Bitter)
  - M.I Boverred – Coldplay (the book The Winter's Tale)
  - Wes T. Bank – Free Palace Stein (an empty Crystal Palace Stein with a zero price tag)
  - West Country Weirdos – Only Fans (one big fan and one small fan)

== Annual entries ==
- 2012 – 87 entries.
- 2013 – 69 entries, which included entries from Ireland, Italy, Paris, and the U.S.
- 2014 – 69 entries, which included entries from Canada, USA, Germany, and Italy.
- 2015 – 69 entries, which included entries from France, Czech Republic, Norway, and Macedonia.
- 2016 – 99 entries, which included entries from Brisbane, Australia (delivered by hand), Scotland, Northern Ireland, and Lundy.
- 2017 – 100 entries, which included entries from Guernsey and Germany.
- 2018 – 90 entries, which included entries from Australia (arrived broken in 69 pieces) and Antigua.
- 2019 – 107 entries, which included entries from Sydney, Australia, Guernsey and Belgium.
- 2020 – 120 entries, which included entries from Kansas, Lockerbie and Downpatrick.
- 2021 – 96 entries, which included entries from Geneva and Rome
- 2022 – 69 entries, which included entries from Tasmania and Tooting
- 2023 – 196 entries, a record year, which included entries from the Poldens, Prague and Pennsylvania
- 2024 – 69 entries, which included entries from Sydney, San Francisco and Sidcot.

== Other competitions ==
Many independent "Turnip Prize" competitions are now held around the world, with differing rules made up by those who are running the competitions. Competitions generally aspire to concept, "We know it's rubbish, but is it art?" and competitors submit entries made from junk with titles that are nonsensical or puns. Marks are awarded for amusement and lack of effort, and competitors are frequently disqualified for applying too much effort.

In 2001, The Sun tabloid newspaper featured its own Turnip Prize.

In 2002, "The Turnip Award" was opened annually for students at Edinburgh College of Art to "carve or design something out of the humble vegetable". The 2005 prize was a mountain bike. In 2005 a Turnip Prize was staged at St Paul's Gallery in Tower Hamlets, London, for local residents.

The term was previously used in 1998 by YBA Jake Chapman of the Chapman Brothers (2003 Turner Prize nominees): "We thought if we couldn't get the Turner Prize we should get the Turnip Prize."

== See also ==
- List of art awards
- Stuckist demonstrations
