= Charles Garrett =

English cricketer and Royal Navy officer

Personal information
- Full name: Charles Richard Garrett
- Born: 3 March 1901; Puri, Bengal Presidency, British India
- Died: 16 February 1968 (aged 66); Kenya
- Batting: Unknown
- Bowling: Unknown

Career statistics
Competition	First-class
Matches	4
Runs scored	70
Batting average	11.66
100s/50s	–/–
Top score	23
Balls bowled	383
Wickets	7
Bowling average	34.28
5 wickets in innings	–
10 wickets in match	–
Best bowling	3/124
Catches/stumpings	5/–
- Source: Cricinfo, 25 December 2019

Charles Richard Garrett (3 March 1901 – 16 February 1968) was an English first-class cricketer and Royal Navy officer.

Garrett was born in British India at Puri in March 1901. He attended the Britannia Royal Naval College, graduating into the Royal Navy as an acting sub-lieutenant, with confirmation in the rank following in January 1921. He was promoted to lieutenant in December 1922. Garrett made his debut in first-class cricket for the Royal Navy Cricket Club against the British Army cricket team at Lord's in 1926. He made three further first-class appearances for the navy in 1929, playing against the Marylebone Cricket Club, the Army and the Royal Air Force. Playing as a bowler, he took a total of 7 wickets in his four matches, with best figures of 3 for 124. He was promoted to lieutenant commander in December 1930, before being placed on the retired list at his own request in January 1934. He came out of retirement during the Second World War, during which he was promoted to commander in March 1941 and mentioned in dispatches in November 1944. He died in Kenya in February 1968.
