= Henry Leach (British Army officer) =

British Army general (1870–1936)

Brigadier-General Henry Leach CB CMG CVO
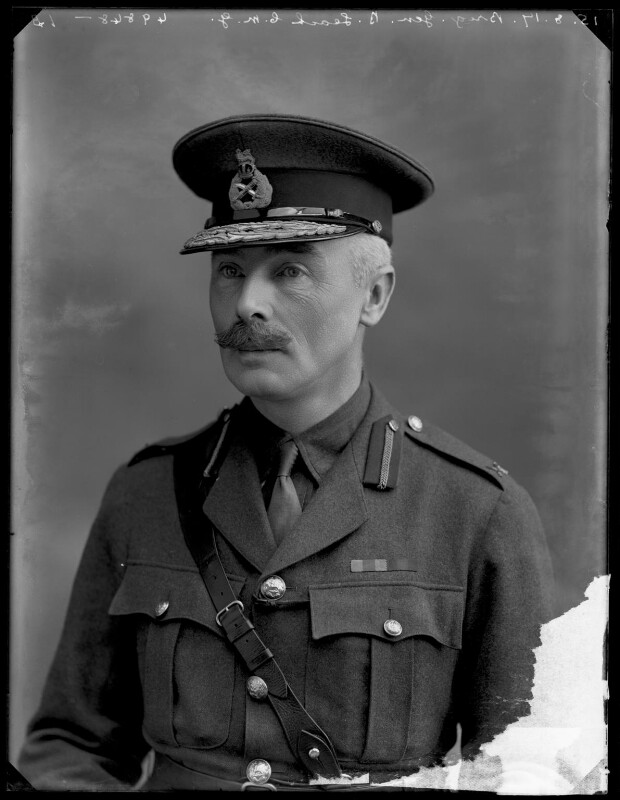
- Leach in 1917
- Born: Henry Edmund Burleigh Leach; 18 July 1870
- Died: 16 August 1936 (aged 66)
- Military career
- Allegiance: United Kingdom
- Branch: British Army
- Rank: Brigadier-General
- Conflicts: Second Boer War; First World War

Brigadier-General Henry Edmund Burleigh Leach CB CMG CVO (18 July 1870 – 16 August 1936) was a British Army officer.

== Early life and career ==
The son of Major-General Sir Edmund Leach of Corston House, Pembrokeshire, he was educated at Uppingham School and the Royal Military College, Sandhurst, where he won the Sword of Honour. His brother, William, was a Royal Navy officer and first-class cricketer. He was commissioned into the Northumberland Fusiliers (later the Royal Northumberland Fusiliers) as a second lieutenant on 2 May 1891, and was promoted to lieutenant on 8 February 1893. He was adjutant of the 4th (Volunteer) Battalion, Yorkshire Regiment, from 1 May 1899.

He was promoted to captain on 27 January 1900, and served with distinction as a special service officer for mounted infantry in the Second Boer War in South Africa.

Following the end of that war in May 1902, he left Cape Town on the SS Canada returning to Southampton in late July, and was back in a regular commission with his regiment three months later. He was promoted to major in 1904, and served as military secretary to the governor of Gibraltar from 1905 to 1910. On 8 July 1908 he transferred from the Northumberland Fusiliers to the South Wales Borderers as a major, supernumerary to establishment, and in 1912 he took command of the 2nd Battalion, South Wales Borderers, being promoted lieutenant-colonel the following year.

== First World War ==
He took the battalion to France on 6 August 1914 following the outbreak of the First World War. On 14 October 1914 he was badly wounded at the Battle of Gheluvelt and spent the rest of the war at the Adjutant-General's Department at the War Office in London. He was appointed an assistant adjutant-general in 1916 and deputy director of personal services, with the appointment of brigadier-general, in 1917. He retired in 1920.

Leach was appointed Companion of the Order of St Michael and St George (CMG) in 1915, Companion of the Order of the Bath (CB) in 1919, and Commander of the Royal Victorian Order (CVO) in the 1920 New Year Honours for his organisation of the 1919 Peace March through London.
