= St Mary's Church, Wedmore =

Church in Somerset, England

Church of St Mary
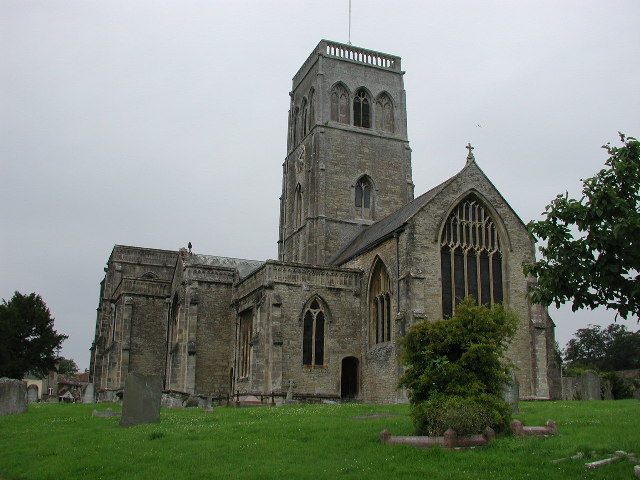

- Location within Somerset

General information
- Location: Wedmore, England
- Coordinates: 51.2277°N 2.8110°W
- Completed: 15th century

The Church of St Mary in Wedmore, Somerset, England is predominantly from the 15th century, although some 12th- and 13th-century work survives. It has been designated as a Grade I listed building.

The tower, which was built around 1400, with its set-back buttresses, includes triple two-light bell chamber windows; those to the centre are louvred, those to each side blank.

== See also ==
- List of Grade I listed buildings in Sedgemoor
- List of towers in Somerset
- List of ecclesiastical parishes in the Diocese of Bath and Wells
