= Derrick Hall (cricketer) =

Irish cricketer (1892–1947)

Cricket information
- Batting: Right-handed

International information
- National side: Ireland

Career statistics
Competition	First-class
Matches	3
Runs scored	71
Batting average	14.20
100s/50s	0/0
Top score	34
Catches/stumpings	2/–
- Source: CricketArchive, 16 November 2022

Frederick Harrison Hall (15 August 1892 – 4 January 1947) was an Irish cricketer. A right-handed batsman, he played five times for the Ireland cricket team between 1924 and 1930.

== Playing career ==
Prior to making his debut for Ireland, Hall made his first-class debut, playing for Dublin University against Northamptonshire in June 1924. He made his Ireland debut two months later, playing against the MCC in Dublin. The following year, he played a first-class match against Scotland, scoring 34 in the Irish first innings, his highest score for Ireland.

He played twice more in 1926, a first-class match against Oxford University and a match against the MCC, before spending four years out of the Ireland side, returning for his final match, against the MCC, in July 1930.

== Statistics ==
In all matches for Ireland, he scored 43 runs at an average of 5.38.
