= Frank Wright (cricketer, born 1807) =

English cricketer and cleric

Frank Bowcher Wright (11 October 1807 – 5 August 1891) was an English cleric, and a cricketer. He was associated with Oxford University Cricket Club and made his debut in 1829.

Wright was educated at The Queen's College, Oxford, matriculating in 1827, and graduating B.A. in 1832.. He then became a Church of England priest and was rector of St John's, Higher Broughton, for 42 years from 1849 until his death. Frank Wynyard Wright was his son.

== Bibliography ==
- Haygarth, Arthur (1996) [1862]. Scores & Biographies, Volume 1 (1744–1826). Kennington: Frederick Lillywhite. ISBN 978-19-00592-23-9.
- Haygarth, Arthur (1997) [1862]. Scores & Biographies, Volume 2 (1827–1840). Kennington: Frederick Lillywhite. ISBN 978-19-00592-23-9.
