= Herbert Wilson (Sussex cricketer) =

English cricketer (1881–1937)

Herbert Langford Wilson (27 June 1881 – 15 March 1937) was an English cricketer active from 1913 to 1930 who played for Sussex and was club captain from 1919 to 1921. He was born in Guilsborough, Northamptonshire and died in Uckfield. He appeared in 145 first-class matches as a righthanded batsman who bowled right arm slow. He scored 6,226 runs with a highest score of 187 among six centuries and took 26 wickets with a best performance of four for 19.
