= Derek Kenderdine =

English cricketer and Royal Navy officer

Personal information
- Full name: Derek Charles Kenderdine
- Born: 28 October 1897; Chislehurst, Kent, England
- Died: 28 August 1947 (aged 49); Cambridge, Cambridgeshire, England
- Batting: Right-handed
- Bowling: Right-arm medium-fast

Career statistics
| Competition | First-class |
|---|---|
| Matches | 2 |
| Runs scored | 7 |
| Batting average | 2.33 |
| 100s/50s | –/– |
| Top score | 6 |
| Balls bowled | 198 |
| Wickets | 2 |
| Bowling average | 60.50 |
| 5 wickets in innings | – |
| 10 wickets in match | – |
| Best bowling | 1/46 |
| Catches/stumpings | 1/– |
- Source: Cricinfo, 18 December 2019

Derek Charles Kenderdine (28 October 1897 – 28 August 1947) was an English first-class cricketer and Royal Navy officer.

The son of Sir Charles Halstaff Kenderdine and Dame Henrietta Florence Bailey, he was born in October 1897 at Chislehurst, Kent. He attended the Royal Naval College, Osborne from where he graduated into the Royal Navy. He served in the latter stages of the First World War with the rank of sub-lieutenant. Following the war, Kenderdine played first-class cricket for the Royal Navy in 1921 and 1922, making two appearances against the British Army cricket team, though without much success. He was promoted to the rank of lieutenant commander in May 1927, at which point he was retired from the navy. He died at a nursing home at Cambridge in August 1947.
