= Philip Davies (cricketer) =

English cricketer

Philip Havelock Davies MC (30 August 1893 – 30 January 1930) was an English cricketer active from 1913 to 1927 who played for Sussex. He was born in Brighton and died in Catterick Camp. He appeared in 27 first-class matches as a righthanded batsman who bowled right arm slow. He scored 286 runs with a highest score of 55 and took 98 wickets with a best performance of six for 59.
