= HMS Ranger (1806) =

Brig of the Royal Navy

United Kingdom
- Name: HMS Ranger
- Builder: John Avery, Dartmouth
- Acquired: May 1806 by purchase
- Renamed: HMS Pigmy 29 May 1806
- Fate: Wrecked 5 March 1807

General characteristics
- Type: Initially:Cutter; Later:Brig
- Tons burthen: 21719/94 (bm)
- Length: Overall:79 ft 0 in (24.1 m); Keel:60 ft 4 7/8 in (18.4 m)
- Beam: 26 ft 0 in (7.9 m)
- Depth of hold: 11 ft 0 in (3.4 m)
- Propulsion: Sail
- Complement: 60
- Armament: 14 × 12-pounder carronades + 2 × 6-pounder chase guns

HMS Ranger was a merchant ship that the Royal Navy purchased on the stocks in May 1806. It registered her on 17 May 1806 as HMS Ranger but renamed her HMS Pigmy on 29 May 1806. Pigmy underwent fitting-out at Portsmouth between 12 June and 26 September 1806, apparently including conversion of her to a brig-rig.

Lieutenant George Higginson commissioned Pigmy in 1807. He sailed her to the Pertuis d'Antioche on the Atlantic coast of France under orders to observe the movements of a French Navy squadron there. When he arrived on the evening of 4 March 1807 he discovered that the fifth-rate frigate HMS Pomone was already on station.

Pigmy was short-handed, her master was in bed, ill, and Higginson was exhausted from having been on deck for several days. He requested that he be permitted to anchor, but was ordered to lay-to off the Île d'Oléron. At 3:30 a.m. on 5 March 1807 Pigmy grounded. Higginson came on deck and directed the attempts to get her off, but she rolled on her side and bilged. At daybreak a nearby French fort observed her and began to fire on her. Pigmy′s crew were unable to escape and took to their boats, landing on shore where they were made prisoners of war.

When Higginson was freed in 1814 he underwent a court martial for the loss of Pigmy. He was admonished to be more careful in the future. He had relied too much on the pilot, and had not come on deck after the watch had warned that shore lights suggested that Pigmy might be in danger.
