= Kenderdine Mill Complex =

- U.S. National Register of Historic Places
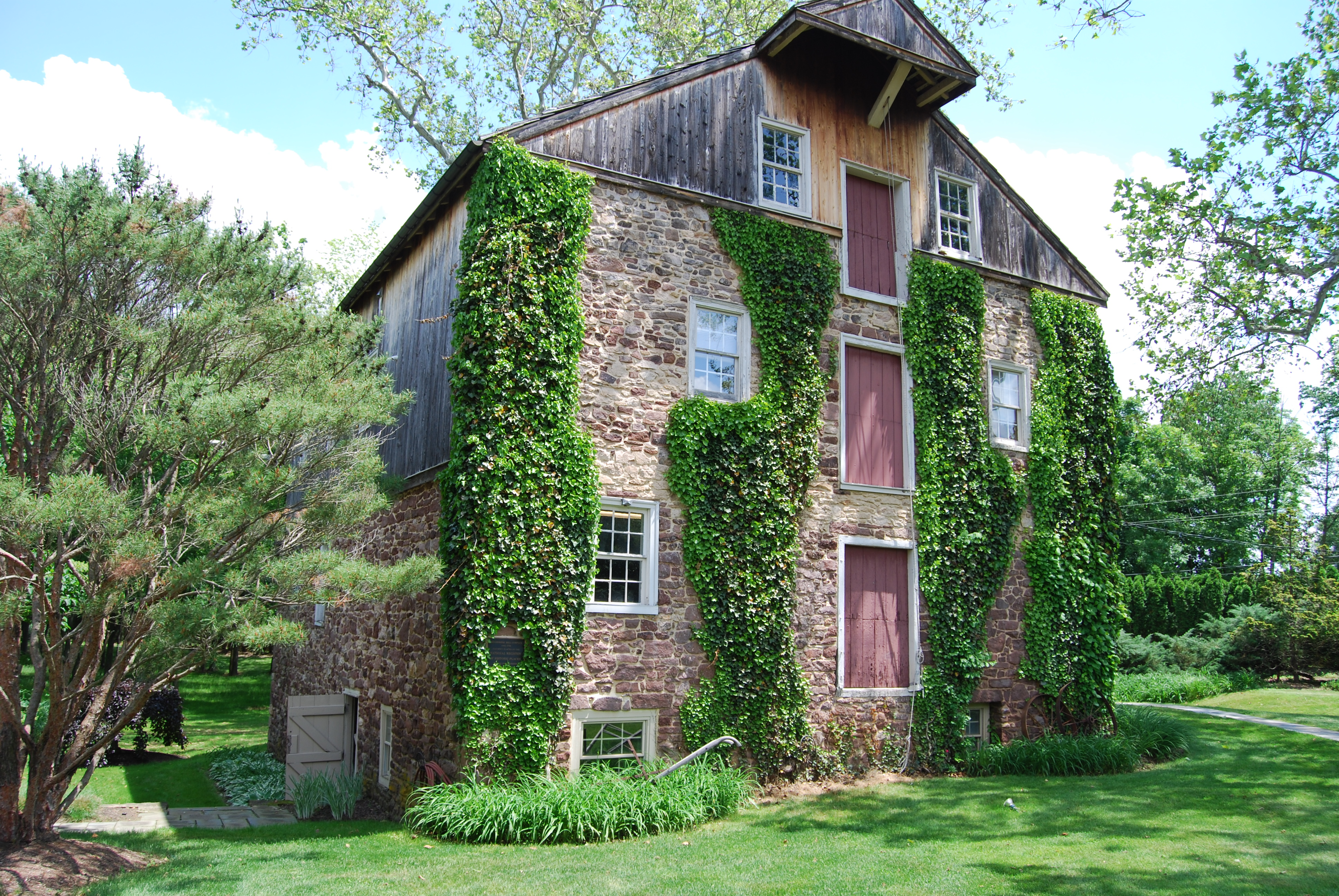
- The Mill at the Kenderdine Mill Complex, May 2011

- Location within Pennsylvania Location within the United States
- Location: Jct. of Keith Valley and Davis Grove Rds., Horsham Township, Pennsylvania
- Coordinates: 40°12′32″N 75°10′15″W
- Area: 1 acre (0.40 ha)
- Built: 1735–1858
- Built by: Joseph Kenderdine
- Architectural style: Colonial, Federal, Postmedieval English
- NRHP reference No.: 91002011
- Added to NRHP: January 22, 1992

The Kenderdine Mill Complex is an historic grist mill complex in Horsham Township, Montgomery County, Pennsylvania, United States.

It was added to the National Register of Historic Places in 1992.

== History and architectural features ==
This complex includes four contributing buildings and one contributing structure. They are the original fieldstone mill (1734–1735), mill race, early 19th century fieldstone mill owner's house, stable and carriage house (1858), and an early fieldstone house.

The buildings today are a private residence.
