= Emile McMaster =

English cricketer (1864–1917)

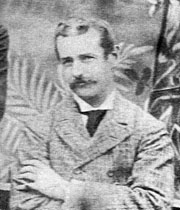
- McMaster in 1889

Personal information
- Full name: Joseph Emile Patrick McMaster
- Born: 16 March 1861; Gilford, County Down, Ireland
- Died: 7 June 1929 (aged 68); London
- Batting: Right-handed
- Role: Batsman

International information
- National side: England
- Only Test (cap 67): 25 March 1889 v South Africa

Career statistics
Competition	Test
Matches	1
Runs scored	0
Batting average	0.00
100s/50s	0/0
Top score	0
Catches/stumpings	0/–
- Source: CricketArchive, 11 October 2022

Joseph Emile Patrick McMaster (16 March 1861 – 7 June 1929) was an Irish amateur cricketer and umpire who played in one retrospectively-recognised Test match for England in 1889. That was his only first-class appearance and he was never a member of any county team. He later umpired first-class matches in South Africa. He was born in Gilford, County Down, and died in London.

Educated at Harrow, McMaster was a right-handed batsman and, uniquely, a player whose Test and first-class career consisted of a single match; also, he did not score a run, take a wicket or hold a catch. He did not bowl but he was praised for his fielding.

== Tour of South Africa, 1888–89 ==
In 1888, Sir Donald Currie agreed to sponsor the first English cricket team to visit South Africa. The 15-man tour party included only nine players who were registered with county clubs and had played in first-class matches. McMaster was one of six additional players who made the numbers up. The team was called Major Warton's XI after its manager, Major R. G. Warton, another occasional player. The captain was future Hollywood actor C. Aubrey Smith, who was then the captain of Sussex County Cricket Club.

Only two matches, both against a team called the South African XI, were eleven-a-side. These were subsequently recognised as the first South Africa v England Test matches. They were played at the St George's Oval in Port Elizabeth and the Newlands Cricket Ground in Cape Town; England won both convincingly. Harry Altham said the standard of the England team was "about that of a weak county". McMaster played at Newlands and batted once, in the first innings, at number nine in the batting order. He was out for a first-ball duck. England won by an innings and 202 runs, the match ending on the second day. England scored 292 (Bobby Abel 120) and dismissed South Africa for 47 (Johnny Briggs 7/17) and 43 (Briggs 8/11). Briggs' match return was 15/28.

McMaster returned to England after the tour ended and is known to have played in club cricket for a team called the Ne'er Do Wells. He intended to go back to South Africa towards the end of the year. Cricket magazine reported that he was going to Maritzburg. Two seasons later, McMaster umpired three first-class matches in South Africa. His son, Michael, also played in a single first-class match.
