= Wilfrid Lord =

English cricketer

Wilfrid Fraser Lord (1 August 1888 – 19 September 1960) was an English first-class cricketer active 1911–19 who played for Middlesex and Oxford University. He was born in Kolhapur, Maharashtra, India; was educated at Keble College, Oxford; died in Hove.
