= Reading Street, Ashford =

Hamlet in Kent, England

Coordinates: 51.04206°N 0.741°E

Reading Street
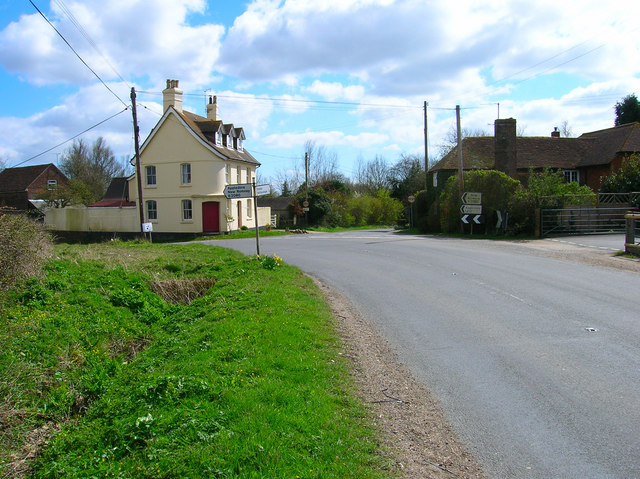
- Reading Street

- Location within Kent
- District: Ashford
- Shire county: Kent
- Region: South East
- Country: England
- Sovereign state: United Kingdom
- Post town: Tenterden
- Postcode district: TN30
- Police: Kent
- Fire: Kent
- Ambulance: South East Coast
- UK Parliament: Weald of Kent

Reading Street is a hamlet approximately 3 miles (4.8 km) south east of Tenterden in Kent, England. It is situated on the B2080 road between Tenterden and Appledore at a point where a bridge crosses the Reading Sewer, and tributary of the River Rother. The population of the hamlet is included in the civil parish of Wittersham.

Its church, dedicated to St Mary the Virgin, was originally moved from the nearby hamlet of Ebony in the 19th century.
