= Gordon Fairbairn =

Australian cricketer

Gordon Armytage Fairbairn (26 June 1892 – 5 November 1973) was an Australian first-class cricketer active 1912–24 who played for Middlesex. He was born in Logan Downs in Queensland, Australia; died in Ocean Grove.
