= Army and Navy cricket team =

The Army and Navy cricket team was a cricket team formed from the combination of the British Army and the Royal Navy, with its players being selected from either of these branches of the British Armed Forces. The team first appeared in a first-class match in 1910 against a combined Oxford and Cambridge Universities cricket team at the Officers Club Services Ground, Aldershot. The team played two further first-class matches, in 1911 in a repeat of the 1910 fixture, though this time played at the United Services Recreation Ground, Portsmouth, and following World War I against the Demobilised Officers at Lord's. The team won its first two fixtures and drew its third.

== Bibliography ==
- A guide to first-class cricket matches played in the British Isles (second ed.). ACS. 1982.
