= Royal Navy Cricket Club =

British cricket team

The Royal Navy Cricket Club is a cricket team representing the British Royal Navy and based at the United Services Recreation Ground, Portsmouth, Hampshire. The club was formed in 1863, although cricket is recorded as having been played by seamen since at least the 17th century.

Between 1912 and 1929 some of the Navy's matches had first-class status, particularly those against other branches of the services, although they also played Cambridge University, MCC, and – in 1927 – the touring New Zealanders. Additionally, in both 1910 and 1911 a combined Army and Navy side played a first-class fixture against a combined Oxford and Cambridge side.

The inter-services competition against the Army and RAF still continues, although it no longer has first-class status. Another competition, the Navy Cup, is competed for within the Navy itself. In the 21st century, the Navy has also set up a women's cricket team.

== See also ==
- British Army cricket team
- Royal Air Force cricket team
- Combined Services cricket team
