= Wells, Somerset =

Cathedral city in Somerset, England

Coordinates: 51°12′34″N 02°38′42″W

Wells
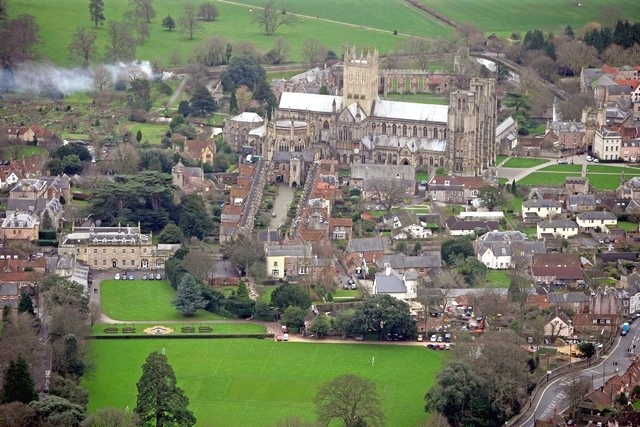
- Aerial photograph of Wells

- Location within Somerset
- Interactive map of Wells
- Population: 11,145 (2021 census)
- OS grid reference: ST545455
- Civil parish: Wells
- Unitary authority: Somerset Council
- Ceremonial county: Somerset
- Region: South West
- Country: England
- Sovereign state: United Kingdom
- Post town: Wells
- Postcode district: BA5
- Dialling code: 01749
- Police: Avon and Somerset
- Fire: Devon and Somerset
- Ambulance: South Western
- UK Parliament: Wells and Mendip Hills

Wells (/wɛlz/) is a cathedral city and civil parish in Somerset, England. It is located on the southern edge of the Mendip Hills, 22 miles (35 km) south-west of Bath, 23 miles (37 km) south of Bristol, and 24 miles (39 km) north-east of Taunton. At the 2021 census, the population of the parish was 11,145 and the population of the built-up area, which extends into the neighbouring parish of St Cuthbert Out, was 12,105.

Wells has held city status since medieval times, because of the presence of Wells Cathedral. Often described as England's smallest city, it is actually the second smallest to the City of London in area and population, but unlike London it is not part of a larger urban agglomeration.

Wells takes its name from three holy wells dedicated to Saint Andrew that lie within the grounds of the Bishop's Palace and cathedral and supply water to the marketplace. A small Roman settlement surrounded them, which grew in importance and size under the Anglo-Saxons when King Ine of Wessex founded a minster church there in 704. The community became a trading centre based on cloth making and Wells is notable for its 17th-century involvement in both the English Civil War and the Monmouth Rebellion. In the 19th century, transport infrastructure improved with stations on three different railway lines. However, following the Beeching axe in 1964 the city has been without a railway link.

The cathedral and the associated religious and medieval architectural history provide much of the employment. The city has a variety of sporting and cultural activities and houses several schools including The Blue School, a state coeducational comprehensive school that was founded in 1641, and the private Wells Cathedral School, which was founded possibly as early as 909 and is one of the five established musical schools for school-age children in the United Kingdom. Wells's historic architecture has led to the city being used as a shooting location for numerous films and television programmes.

== History ==
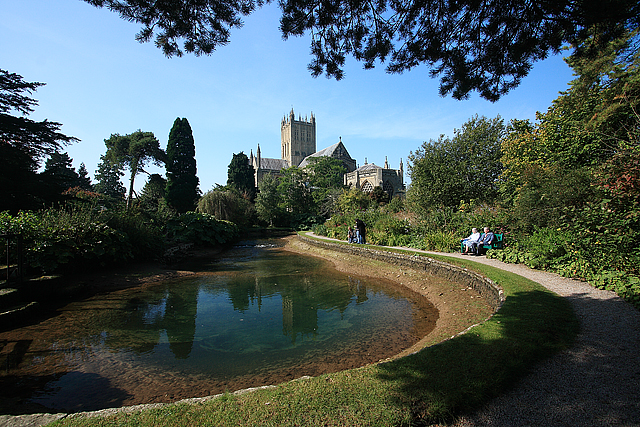
One of the three wells which give the city its name; two are located in the gardens of the Bishop's Palace (as shown) and one in the Market Place.

The city was a Roman settlement that became an important centre under the Anglo-Saxons when King Ine of Wessex founded a minster church in 704. Two hundred years later, in 909, it became the seat of the newly formed bishopric of Wells; but in 1090, the bishop's seat was removed to Bath. The move caused severe arguments between the canons of Wells and the monks of Bath until 1245 when the bishopric was renamed the Diocese of Bath and Wells, to be elected by both religious houses. With the construction of the current cathedral and the bishop's palace in the first half of the 13th century, under the direction of Bishop Reginald and later Bishop Jocelin, a native of the city, Wells became the principal seat of the diocese.

The 8th-century port at Bleadney on the River Axe enabled goods to be brought to within 3 mi (5 km) of Wells. In the Middle Ages overseas trade was carried out from the port of Rackley. In the 14th century a French ship sailed up the river, and by 1388 Thomas Tanner from Wells used Rackley to export cloth and corn to Portugal, and received iron and salt in exchange. Wells had been a centre for cloth making; however, in the 16th and 17th centuries this diminished, but the city retained its important market focus. Wells in the 19th century had the largest cheese market in the west of England.

Wells was listed in the Domesday Book of 1086 as Welle, from the Old English wiells, not as a town but as four manors with a total of 132 households, which implies a population of around 500–600. Earlier names for the settlement have been identified which include Fontanetum, in a charter of 725 granted by King Ina to Glastonbury and Fontanensis Ecclesia. "Tidesput" or "Tithesput furlang" relates to the area east of the bishop's garden in 1245. Wells was part of, and gave its name to, the hundred of Wells Forum.

Wells had been granted charters to hold markets by Bishop Robert (1136–66) and free burgage tenure was granted by Bishop Reginald (1174–1191). Wells was recognised as a free borough by a Royal charter of King John in 1201. The city remained under episcopal control until its charter of incorporation from Queen Elizabeth I in 1589. City status was most recently confirmed by Queen Elizabeth II by letters patent issued under the Great Seal dated 1 April 1974, which granted city status specifically to the civil parish; on that date major local government reorganisation came into effect, which involved the abolition of the municipal borough of Wells.

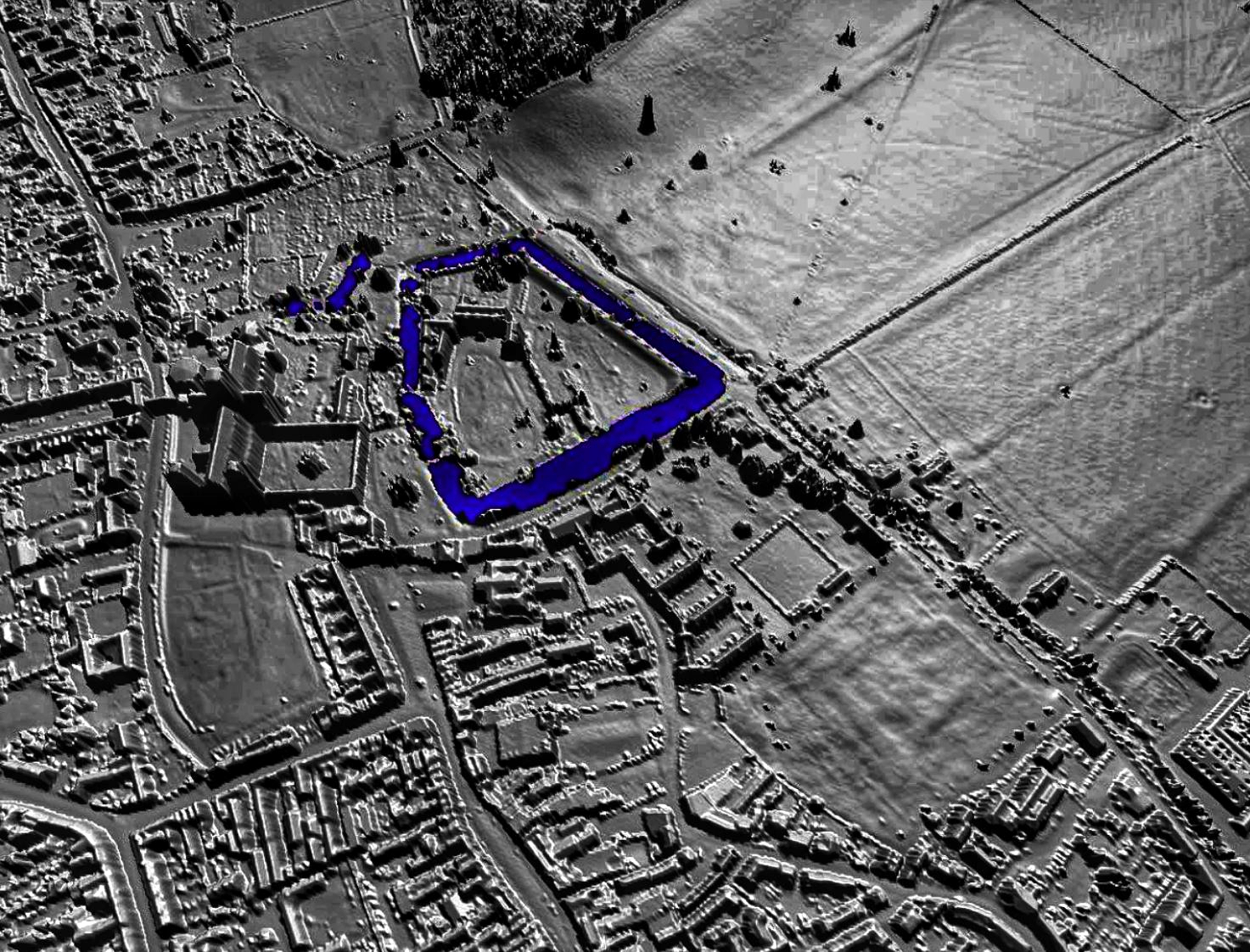
A lidar view of the cathedral and palace revealing archaeological residues in nearby areas.

Anne of Denmark, the wife of King James came to Wells on 20 August 1613. She was entertained by a pageant performed by the town's trades and crafts. The blacksmiths presented Vulcan's forge. The butchers made a tableau of "old virgins", with their attires made of cow tails and necklaces made of cow's horns, who were drawn in a chariot by men and boys dressed in ox skins. The mayor, William Bull, held a dinner for members of the queen's household including her four maids of honour. The Venetian ambassador Antonio Foscarini recorded her delight.

During the English Civil War (1642–1651), at what became known as the "Siege of Wells", the city found itself surrounded by Parliamentarian guns on the Bristol, Glastonbury and Shepton Mallet sides. Col. William Strode had 2,000 men and 150 horse. The Royalists evacuated the city. Parliamentarian troops then used the cathedral to stable their horses and damaged much of the ornate sculpture by using it for firing practice.

William Penn stayed in Wells shortly before leaving for America (1682), spending a night at The Crown Inn. Here he was briefly arrested for addressing a large crowd in the market place, but released on the intervention of the Bishop of Bath and Wells. During the Monmouth Rebellion (1685) the rebel army attacked the cathedral in an outburst against the established church and damaged the west front. Lead from the roof was used to make bullets, windows were broken, the organ smashed and horses stabled in the nave. Wells was the final location of the Bloody Assizes on 23 September 1685. In a makeshift court lasting only one day, over 500 men were tried and the majority sentenced to death.

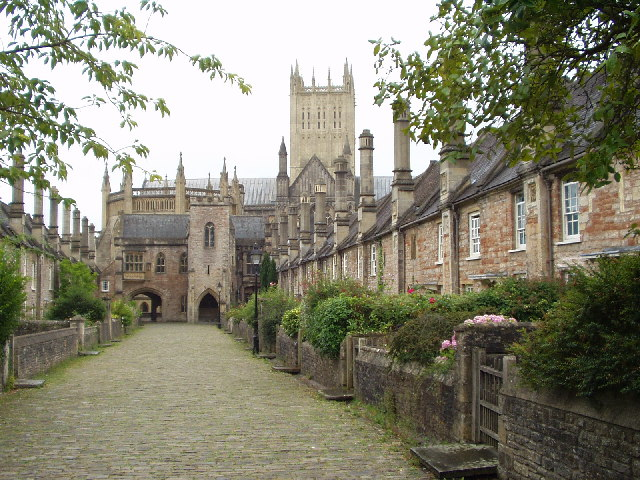
Vicars' Close facing the cathedral

Wells' first station, Priory Road, opened in 1859 on the Somerset Central Railway (later the Somerset & Dorset Joint Railway, S&DJR) as the terminus of a short branch from Glastonbury. A second railway, the East Somerset, opened a branch line from Witham in 1862 and built Wells East Somerset station to the east of Priory Road. In 1870, the Cheddar Valley line branch of the Bristol & Exeter Railway from Yatton, reached Wells and built a third station at Tucker Street. Matters were simplified when the Great Western Railway acquired the Cheddar Valley and the East Somerset lines and built a link between them that ran through the S&DJR's Priory Road station. In 1878, when through trains began running between Yatton and Witham, the East Somerset station closed, but through trains did not stop at Priory Road until 1934. Priory Road closed to passenger traffic in 1951 when the S&DJR branch line from Glastonbury was shut, though it remained the city's main goods depot. Tucker Street closed in 1963 under the Beeching cuts, which closed the Yatton to Witham line to passengers. Goods traffic to Wells ceased in 1964. Southern Railway West Country class steam locomotive no 34092 was named City of Wells at a ceremony at Priory Road station in 1949. It was used to haul the Golden Arrow service between London and Dover. It was withdrawn from service in 1964, and rescued from a scrapyard in 1971, and as August 2021 was operational on the East Lancashire Railway.

During World War II, Stoberry Park in Wells was the location of a prisoner-of-war camp, housing Italian prisoners from the Western Desert Campaign, and later German prisoners after the Battle of Normandy. Penleigh Camp on the Wookey Hole Road was a German working camp.

== Governance ==
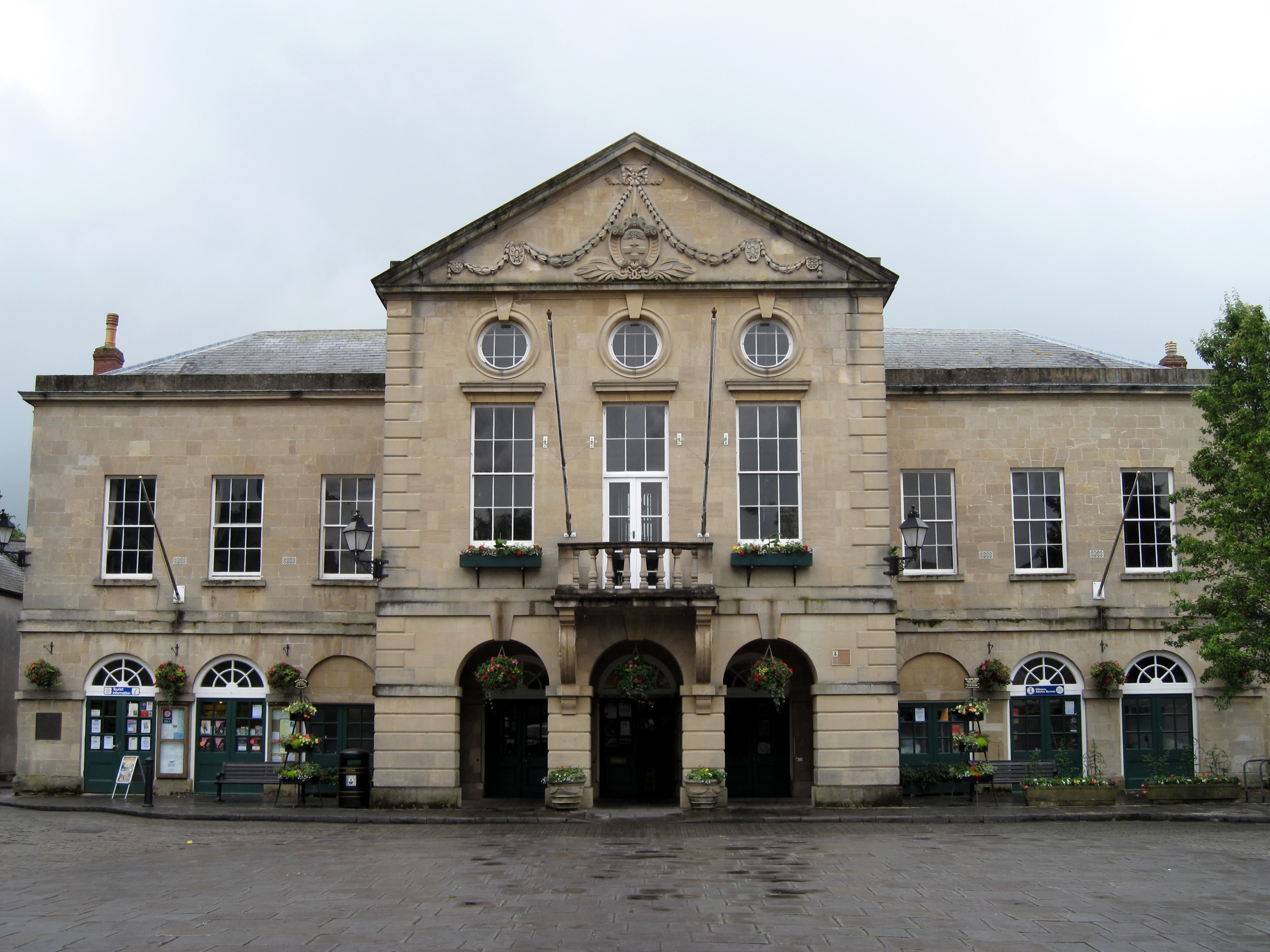
Wells Town Hall

There are two tiers of local government covering Wells, at parish (city) and unitary authority level: Wells City Council and Somerset Council. The city council is based at Wells Town Hall in the Market Place. The Town Hall was built in 1778. The building also houses the Magistrates' Court and other offices. It was formerly also one of the venues for the Somerset county assizes, which last sat here in October 1970. The assizes were abolished under the Courts Act 1971.

For national elections, the city forms part of the Wells and Mendip Hills constituency.

=== Administrative history ===
There were two ancient parishes with their parish churches in Wells: Wells St Andrew, which covered a relatively small area around the cathedral (which is dedicated to St Andrew) and was sometimes described as a liberty, and Wells St Cuthbert, which encircled St Andrew's parish and covered the rest of the city plus an extensive surrounding rural area. The city was also an ancient borough, with the borough boundaries covering the more built-up part of St Cuthbert's parish and the whole of St Andrew's parish. The borough's earliest known municipal charter dated from 1201. The borough was reformed to become a municipal borough in 1836 under the Municipal Corporations Act 1835, which standardised how most boroughs operated across the country.

Parish functions under the poor laws were exercised separately for the parts of St Cuthbert's parish inside and outside the borough boundaries. The legal definition of 'parish' was changed in 1866 to be the areas used for administering the poor laws, and so the old St Cuthbert's parish became the two civil parishes of St Cuthbert In and St Cuthbert Out. The borough then comprised the two civil parishes of St Andrew and St Cuthbert In until 1933, when they were merged into a single civil parish of Wells matching the borough.

The borough of Wells was abolished in 1974 under the Local Government Act 1972. The area then became part of the new Mendip District. A successor parish called Wells covering the former borough was created as part of the 1974 reforms. The city status formerly held by the borough was transferred to the new parish, allowing the parish council to take the title Wells City Council.

Mendip district was abolished in 2023. Somerset County Council then took over district-level functions across its area, making it a unitary authority, and was renamed Somerset Council.

The Wells city arms show an ash tree surrounded by three water wells, crested with a gold mural crown, with the Latin motto Hoc fonte derivata copia (translated: "the fullness that springs from this well").

The council formalised twinning links with Paray-le-Monial, France, and Bad Dürkheim, Germany in 1979, then added Fontanellato, Italy in 1983; the Wells Twinning Association and the Mayor of Wells organise the twinning activities.

HMS Somerset, Mary Bignal-Rand, Danny Nightingale, The Rifles and the late Harry Patch have the Freedom of the City. The Somerset Light Infantry received the freedom of the City of Wells following their return from Cyprus in 1956.

== City status ==
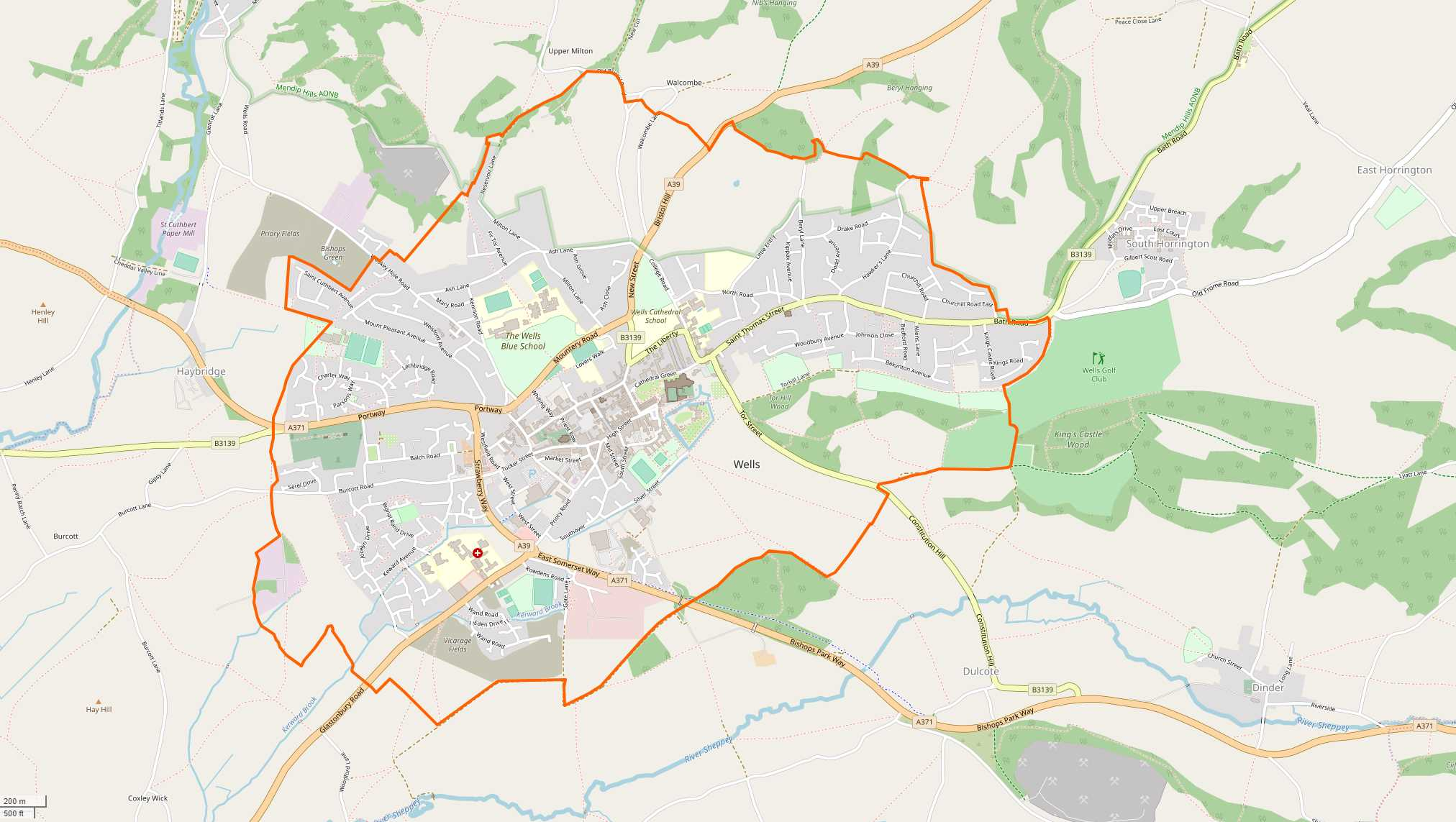
Map of Wells showing city/parish border, and urban area: City/parish border Countryside Urban area

As the seat of an ancient cathedral and diocese, Wells is historically regarded as a city. City status was most recently confirmed by Queen Elizabeth II by letters patent dated 1 April 1974, which granted city status specifically to the civil parish. As the designation is typically awarded to a local council area, this administrative area is then considered to be the formal boundary of the city, including its urban and rural extents. Wells, due to its urban area and wider parish sizes, is near-smallest city on several measures based on 2011 statistics:

- Its city council boundary area, surrounded wholly by countryside makes Wells the smallest free-standing city in the UK (2.11 sq mi) - the City of London is smaller (1.12) but is part of a much larger urban area (Greater London - 671 sq mi)
- 2nd smallest in England and UK by city council boundary area (2.11 sq mi) behind the City of London (1.12)
- 2nd smallest in England only by population and urban area (10,536 residents, 1.35 sq mi) behind the City of London (8,072, 1.12)
- 4th smallest in the UK by population and urban area behind St Davids (1,841 residents, 0.23 sq mi), St Asaph (3,355, 0.50) and the City of London (8,072, 1.12).

== Geography ==
Wells lies at the foot of the southern escarpment of the Mendip Hills where they meet the Somerset Levels. The hills are largely made of carboniferous limestone, which is quarried at several nearby sites. In the 1960s, the Mendip television transmitter, was installed on Pen Hill above Wells, approximately two miles (three kilometres) from the centre of the city.

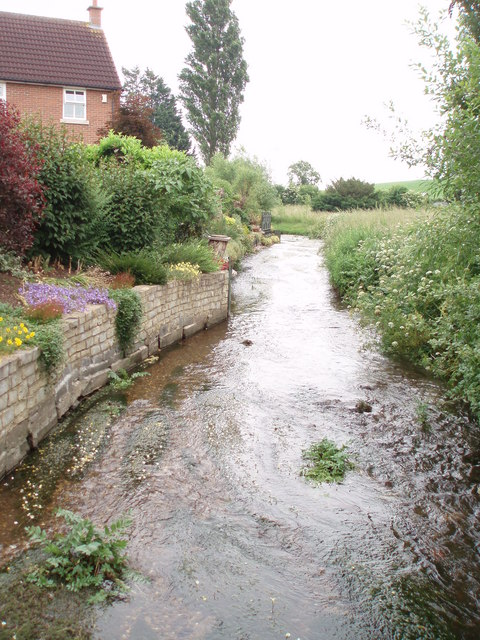
Keward Brook

Streams passing through caves on the Mendip Hills, including Thrupe Lane Swallet and Viaduct Sink (approximately 5 km or 3 mi east of the city), emerge at Saint Andrew's Well in the garden of the Bishop's Palace, from where the water fills the moat around the Palace and then flows into Keward Brook, which carries it for approximately a mile west to the point where the brook joins the River Sheppey in the village of Coxley.

Along with the rest of South West England, the Mendip Hills have a temperate climate which is generally wetter and milder than the rest of England. The annual mean temperature is about 10 °C (50 °F) with seasonal and diurnal variations, but due to the modifying effect of the sea, the range is less than in most other parts of the United Kingdom. January is the coldest month with mean minimum temperatures between 1 and 2 °C (34 and 36 °F). July and August are the warmest months in the region with mean daily maxima around 21 °C (70 °F). In general, December is the dullest month and June the sunniest. The south west of England enjoys a favoured location, particularly in summer, when the Azores High extends its influence north-eastwards towards the UK.

Cloud often forms inland, especially near hills, and reduces exposure to sunshine. The average annual sunshine totals around 1600 hours. Rainfall tends to be associated with Atlantic depressions or with convection. In summer, convection caused by solar surface heating sometimes forms shower clouds and a large proportion of the annual precipitation falls from showers and thunderstorms at this time of year. Average rainfall is around 800–900 mm (31–35 in). About 8–15 days of snowfall is typical. November to March have the highest mean wind speeds, with June to August having the lightest. The predominant wind direction is from the south west.

The civil parish of Wells is entirely surrounded by the parish of St Cuthbert Out.

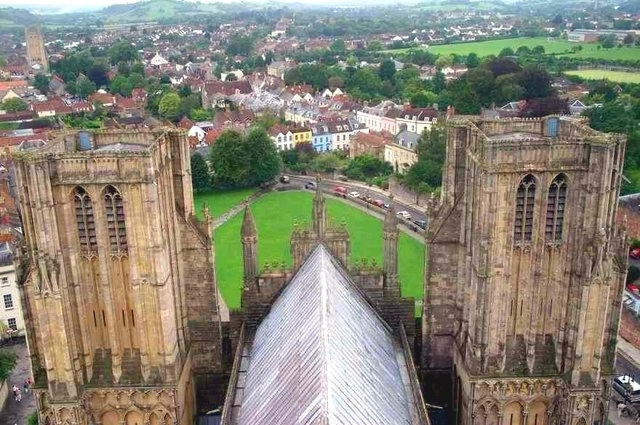
Looking west from the tower of the cathedral

== Demography ==
The population of the civil parish, recorded in the 2011 census, was 10,536. Of this number 97.5% are ethnically White (with the more specific White British category recorded at 93.5%) and 66.5% described themselves as Christian. The mean average age in 2011 was 41.9 years (the median age being 43).

Census population of Wells parish
| Census | Population | Households | Ref. |
|---|---|---|---|
| 2001 | 10,406 | | |
| 2011 | 10,536 | | |
| 2021 | 11,145 | 5,362 | |

== Economy ==
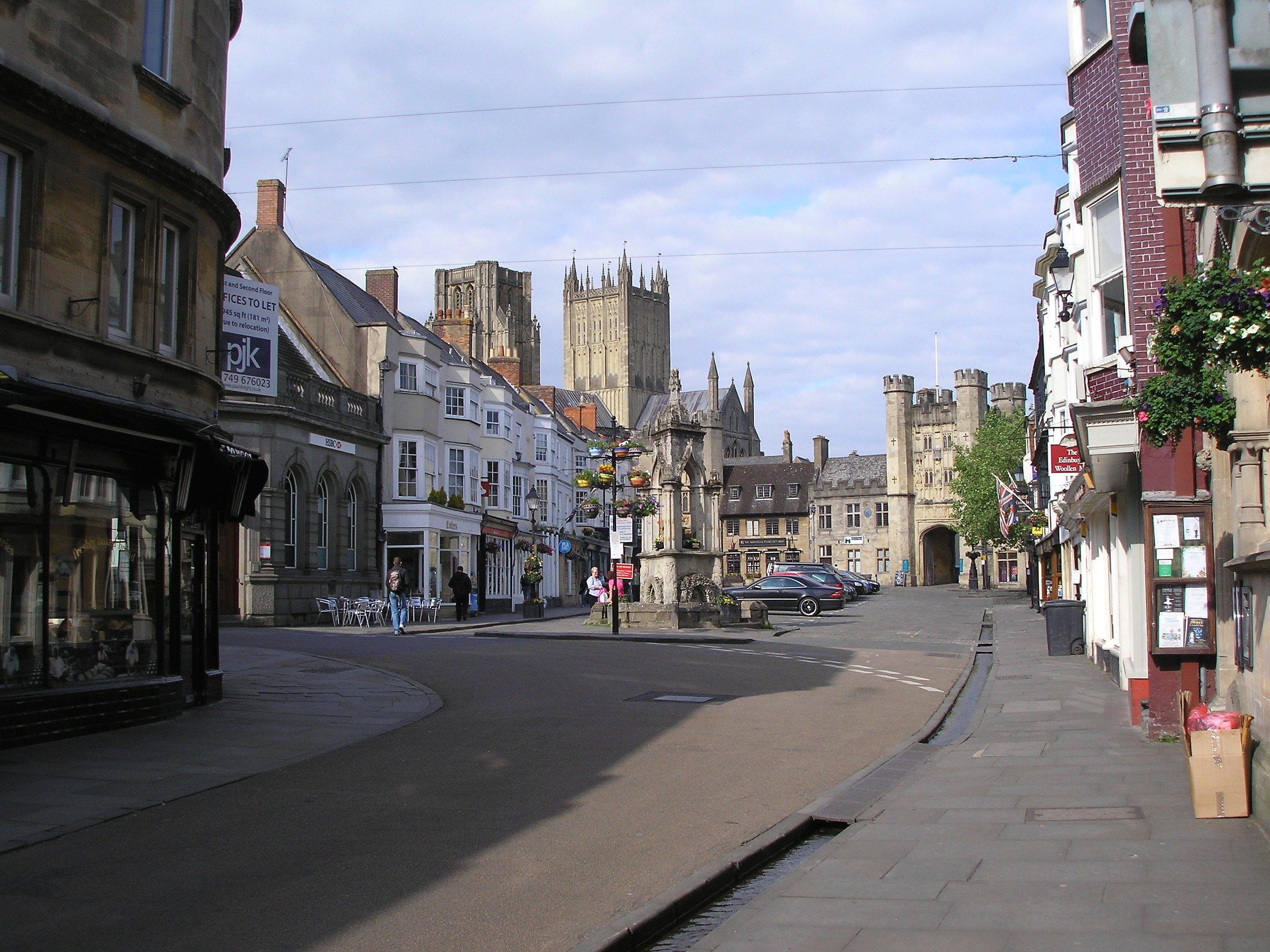
The Market Place is the site of one of the city's ancient wells (note the water flowing in the gully, down High Street); the Bishop's Eye gatehouse (to the Bishop's Palace) is at the far end; two of Wells Cathedral's towers can be seen rising behind the buildings.

Following construction of the A39/A371 bypass, the centre of the city has returned to being that of a quiet market town. It has all the modern conveniences plus shops, hotels and restaurants. Wells is a popular tourist destination, due to its historical sites, its proximity to Bath, Bristol, Stonehenge and Glastonbury and its closeness to the Somerset coast. Also nearby are Wookey Hole Caves, the Mendip Hills and the Somerset Levels. Somerset cheese, including Cheddar, is made locally. Wells is part of the Wells and Shepton Mallet travel to work area which also includes Glastonbury, Cheddar and surrounding areas.

The historic part of the city has often been used for filming both documentaries and many period films and television series, including some with very large productions. Recent examples (2014 to 2017) include filming for Series 2 of Poldark, Dunkirk, Another Mother's Son, Broadchurch, The Levelling, Mum's List, and The White Princess. In addition to Wells Cathedral, the Bishop's Palace, Wells is particularly popular among productions, with filming at the latter conducted (in 2015–2016) for The Huntsman: Winter's War, Galavant, Terry and Mason's The Great British Food Trip, Escape to the Country, and Holiday of My Lifetime.

== Transport ==
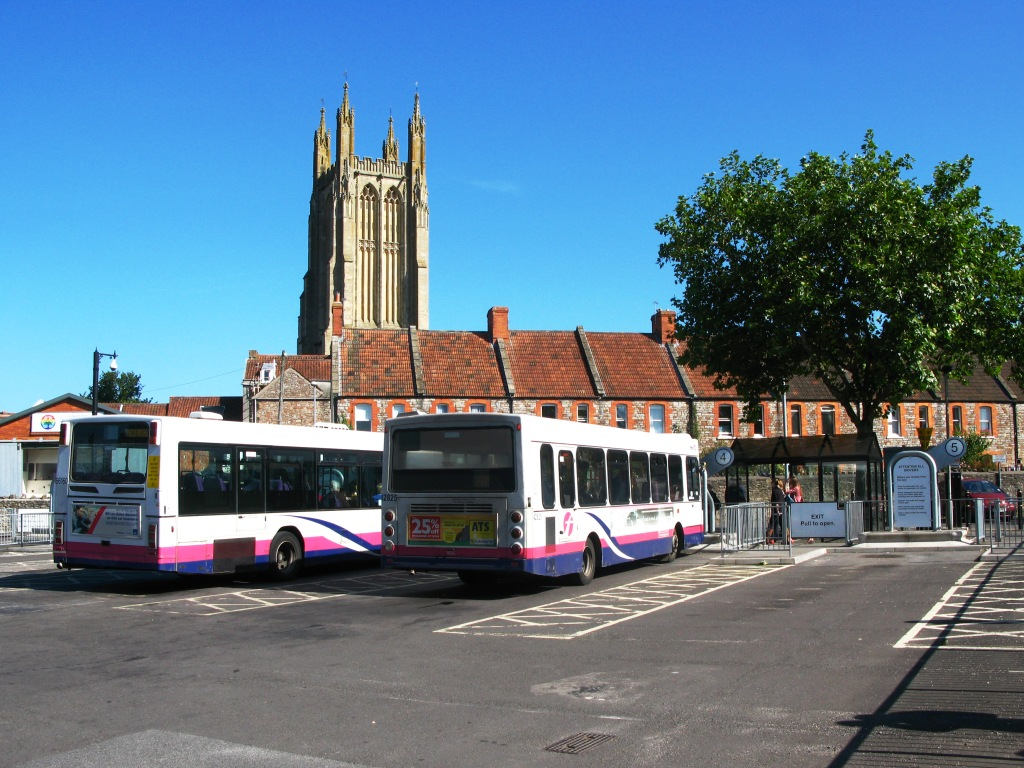
Wells bus station

Wells is situated at the junction of three numbered routes. The A39 goes north-east to Bath and south-west to Glastonbury and Bridgwater. The A371 goes north-west to Cheddar and Weston-super-Mare, and east to Shepton Mallet. The B3139 goes west to Highbridge, and north-east to Radstock and Trowbridge. The nearest motorway connections are at junction 23 on the M5 via the A39 and at junction 1 of the M32 via the A39 and A37.

Wells is served by First West of England bus services to Bristol and Bristol Temple Meads station, Bath, Frome, Shepton Mallet, Yeovil, Street and Weston-super-Mare, as well as providing some local service. It is served by Berrys Coaches daily Superfast service to and from London. The bus station is in Princes Road. The Mendip Way and Monarch's Way long-distance footpaths pass through the city, as does National Cycle Route 3.

=== Railways ===
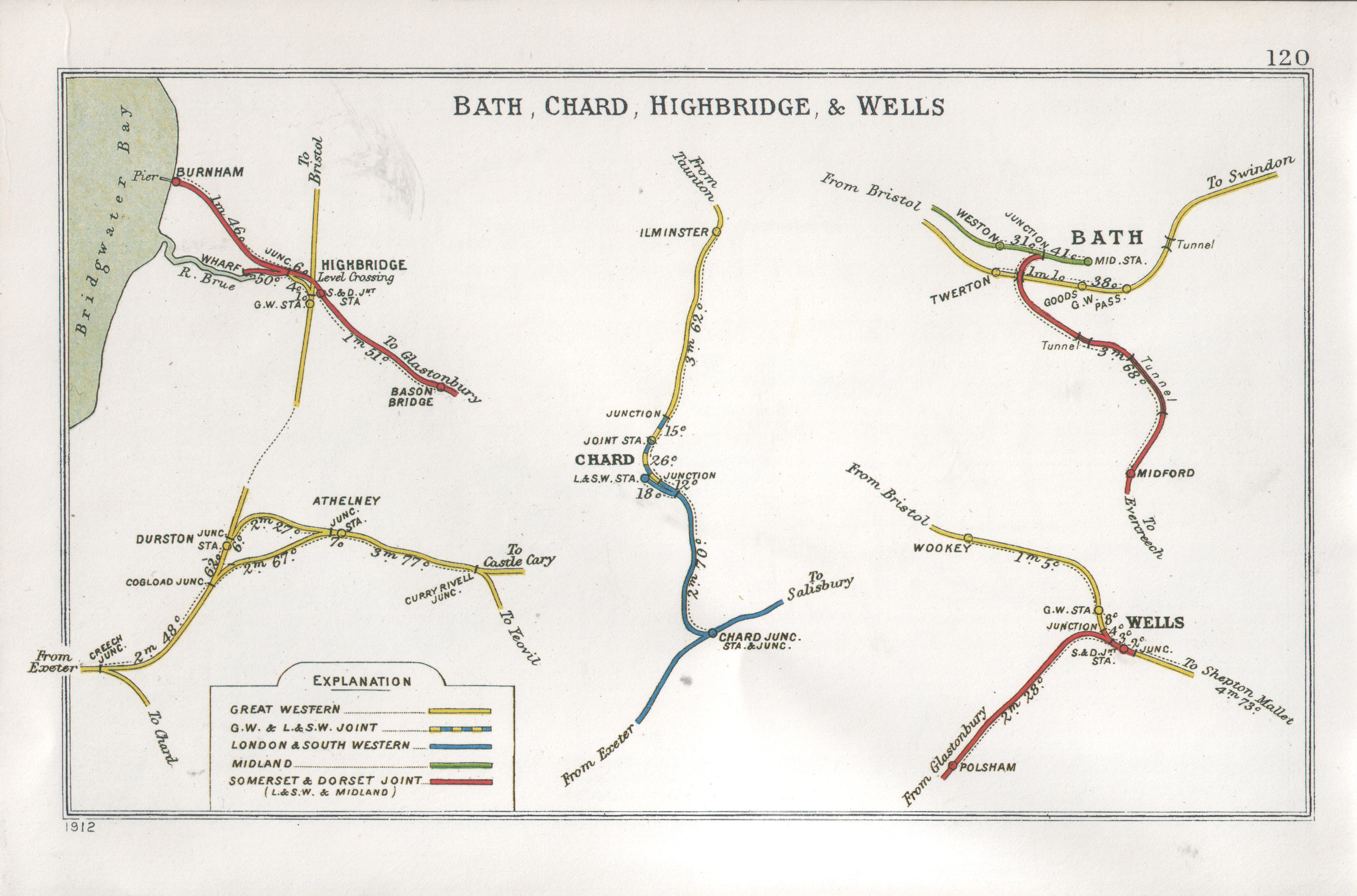
Wells stations on the Railway Clearing House map

Wells had two stations which were closed by the Beeching Axe in the 1960s: Wells (Tucker Street) railway station and Wells (Priory Road) railway station. The nearest railway line today is the East Somerset Railway.

The nearest station today for the national rail network is Castle Cary, 12 miles (19 km) away. Bristol Temple Meads railway station is accessible via the 376 bus route; the journey time is around one hour.

== Education ==
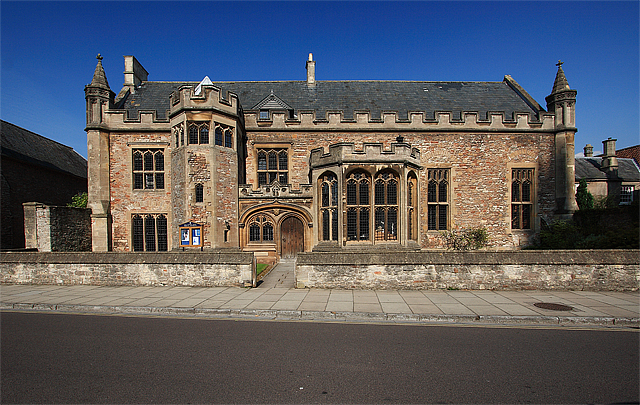
The Music School of Wells Cathedral School

The Blue School, founded in 1641, is a state coeducational comprehensive school and has been awarded Specialist science college status. It has 1,641 students aged 11–18 of both sexes and all ability levels.

Wells Cathedral School, founded in 909, is a private school that has a Christian emphasis and is one of the five established musical schools for school-age children in Britain. The school has over 700 pupils between the ages of 3 and 18. The school's boarding houses line the northern parts of the city and the music school retains close links with Wells Cathedral. The primary schools in Wells are Stoberry Park School, St Cuthbert's Church of England Infants School, St Cuthbert's Church of England Junior School and St Joseph and St Teresa Catholic Primary School.

== Culture ==
Wells and Mendip Museum includes many historical artefacts from the city and surrounding Mendip Hills. Wells is part of the West Country Carnival circuit.

Wells Film Centre shows current releases and, in conjunction with the Wells Film Society shows less well-known and historical films. The previous cinema, The Regal in Priory Road, closed in 1993 and is now Kudos Nightclub. It was built in 1935 by ES Roberts from Flemish bond brickwork with Art Deco features. It is a Grade II listed building, and was on the Buildings at Risk Register until its restoration which included the restoration and repair of the stained glass façade. Wells Little Theatre is operated by a voluntary society which started in 1902. In 1969 they took over the old boy's building of Wells Blue School, where they put on a variety of operatic and other productions.

Milton Lodge is a house overlooking the city. It has a terraced garden, which was laid out in the early 20th century, is listed as Grade II on the Register of Historic Parks and Gardens of special historic interest in England.

== Local media ==
Television programmes and local news is provided by BBC West and ITV West Country. Local radio stations are BBC Radio Somerset, Heart West, and Greatest Hits Radio South West. The city is served by these local newspapers: Wells Voice, The Somerset County Gazette and SomersetLive.

== Religious sites ==
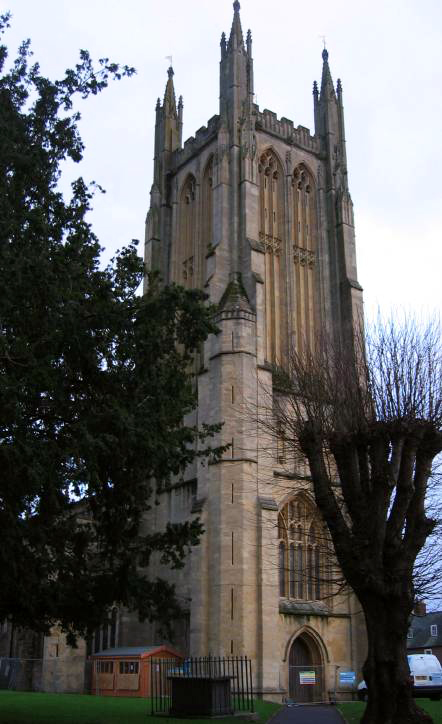
St.Cuthbert Parish Church, Wells

A walled precinct, the Liberty of St Andrew, encloses the twelfth-century Cathedral, the Bishop's Palace, the Vicar's Close, and residences of the clergy who serve the cathedral. Entrances include the Penniless Porch, the Bishop's Eye and Brown's Gatehouse which were all built around 1450.

The Church of St Cuthbert has a Somerset stone tower and a carved roof. Originally an Early English building (13th century), it was much altered in the Perpendicular period. The nave's coloured ceiling was repainted in 1963 at the instigation of the then Vicar's wife, Mrs Barnett. Until 1561 the church had a central tower which either collapsed or was removed, and has been replaced with the current tower over the west door. Bells were cast for the tower by Roger Purdy.

The polychromatic stone Church of St Thomas was built during 1856 and 1857 and extended by Samuel Sanders Teulon in 1864, commemorating the work of Richard Jenkyns the Dean of Wells who had cared for the poor in the east of the city.

Wells Vineyard Church is an Evangelical Church formed in 2003.

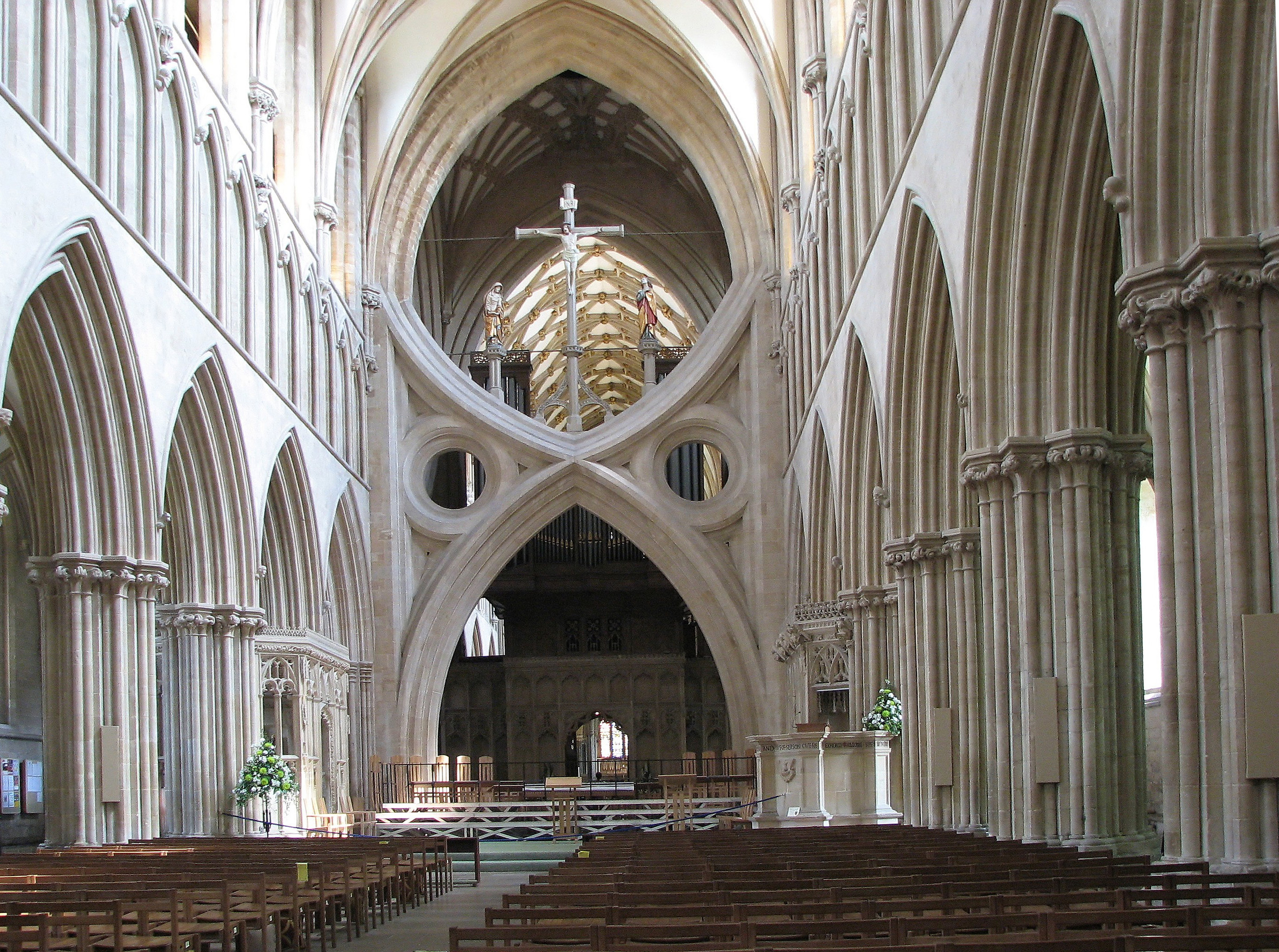
Interior of Wells Cathedral, showing inverted arches inserted in 1338 to strengthen the building

=== Wells Cathedral ===
The cathedral is the seat of the Church of England Diocese of Bath and Wells. Wells has been an ecclesiastical city of importance since at least the early 8th century. Parts of the building date back to the tenth century, and it is a grade I listed building. It is known for its fine fan vaulted ceilings, Lady Chapel and windows, and the scissor arches which support the central tower. The west front is said to be the finest collection of statuary in Europe, retaining almost 300 of its original medieval statues, carved from the cathedral's warm, yellow Doulting stone. The Chapter House, at the top of a flight of stone stairs, leading out from the north transept is an octagonal building with a fan-vaulted ceiling. It is here that the business of running the cathedral is still conducted by the members of the Chapter, the cathedral's ruling body. Wells Cathedral clock is famous for its 24-hour astronomical dial and set of jousting knights that perform every quarter-hour. The cathedral has the heaviest ring of ten bells in the world. The tenor bell weighs just over 56 cwt (6,272 lb, 2,844 kg).

The Vicars' Close is the oldest residential street in Europe. The Close is tapered by 10 ft (3.0 m) to make it look longer when viewed from the bottom. When viewed from the top, however, it looks shorter. The Old Deanery dates from the 12th century, and St John's Priory from the 14th. The street is owned by Wells Cathedral.

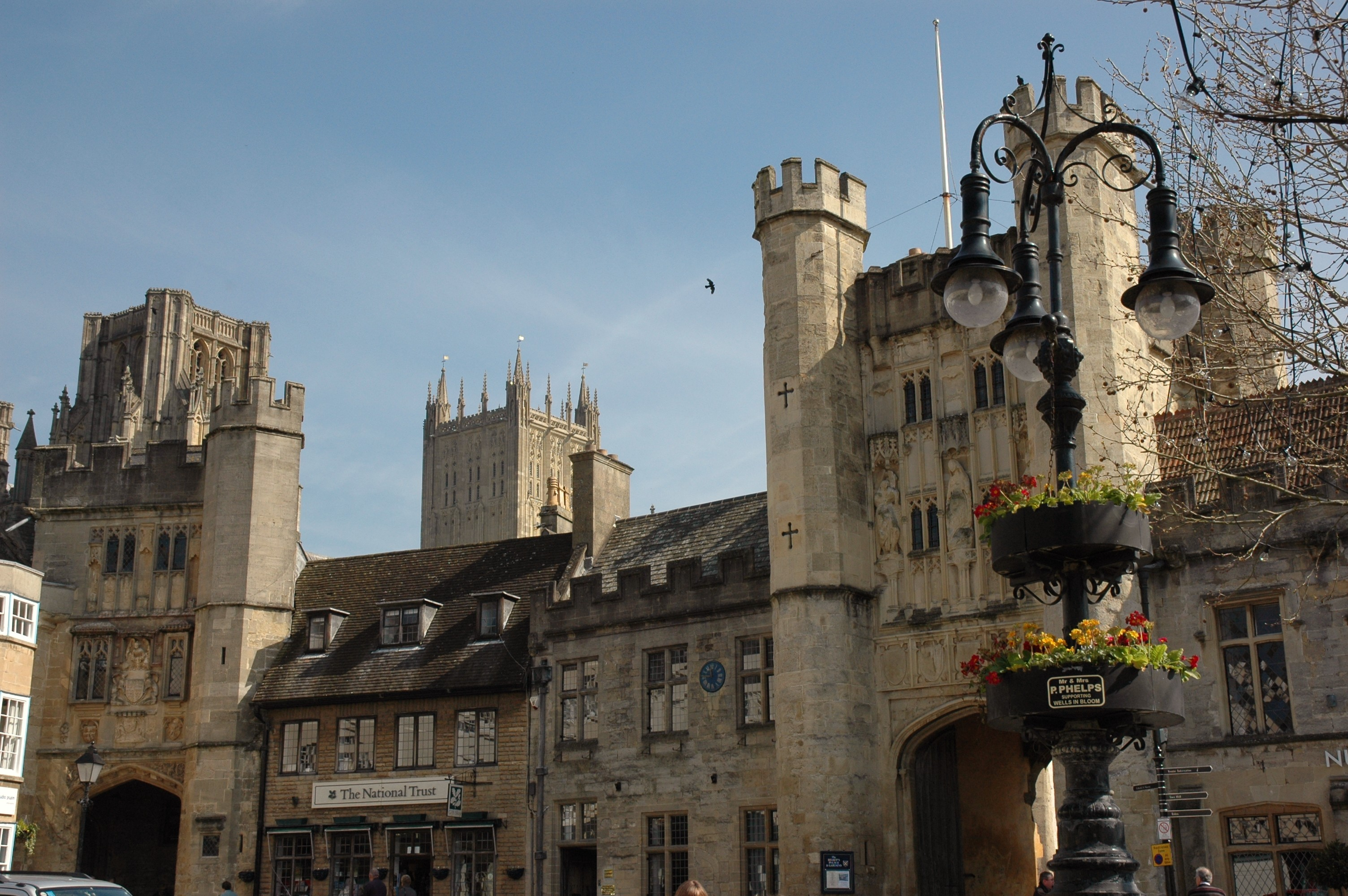
Penniless Porch and the Bishop's Eye

=== Bishop's Palace ===
The Bishop's Palace has been the home of the bishops of the Diocese of Bath and Wells for 800 years. The hall and chapel date from the 14th century. There are 14 acres (5.7 ha) of gardens including the springs from which the city takes its name. Visitors can also see the Bishop's private chapel, ruined great hall and the gatehouse with portcullis and drawbridge beside which mute swans ring a bell for food. The Bishop's Barn was built in the 15th century.

== Sport ==
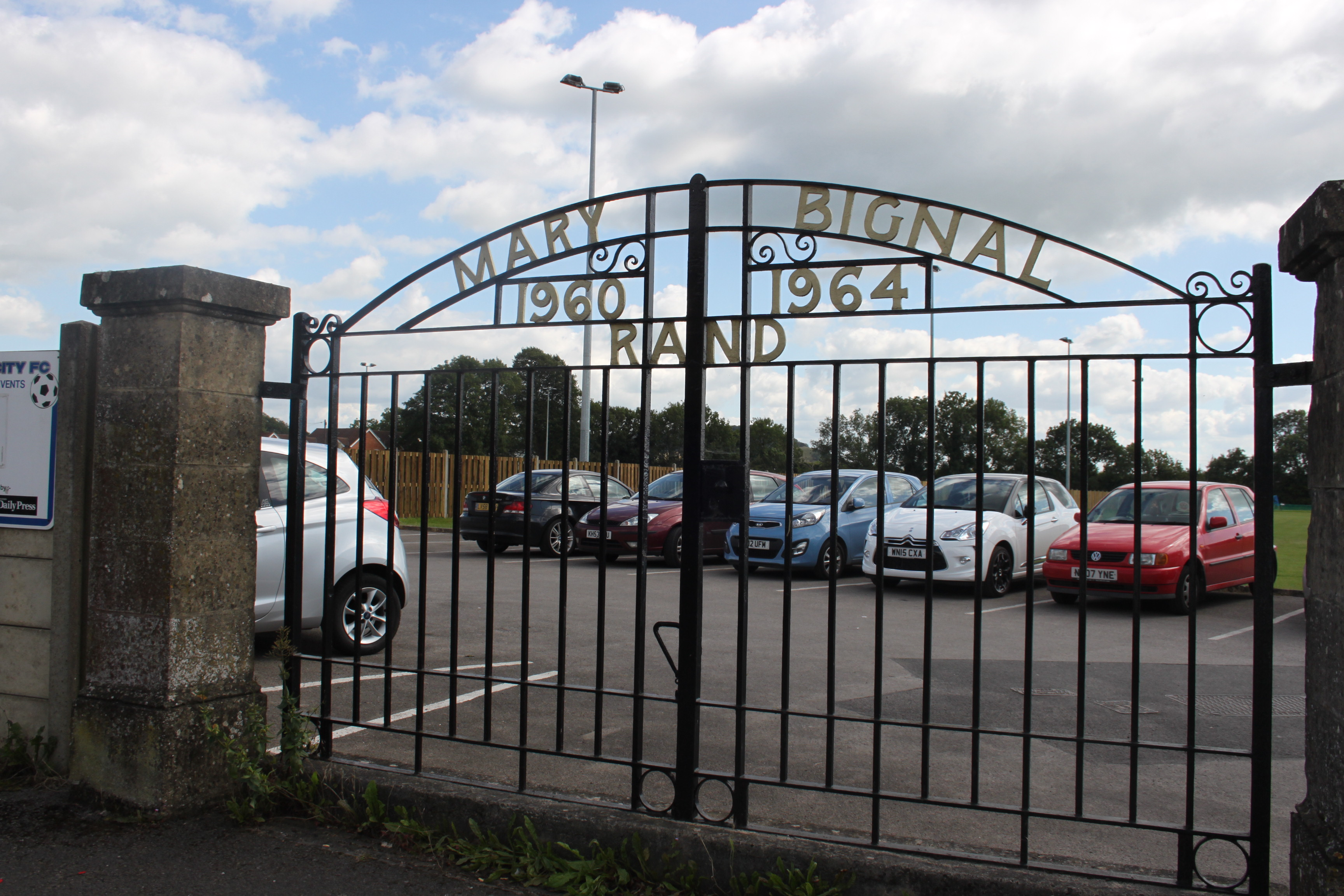
The gates of Rowdens Road Cricket Ground dedicated to Mary Bignal-Rand

The city has two football clubs, one being Wells City F.C., past winners of the Western League. Belrose FC play their football in the Mid-Somerset Football League at Haybridge Park. Wells Cricket Club runs eight sides across senior, junior and women's cricket; they are based at South Horrington. Wells Wanderers Cricket Club are based in Meare. Rowdens Road Cricket Ground was a first-class venue. No longer a cricket ground, it is now occupied in part by Wells FC.

Mid-Somerset Hockey Club and Wells City Acorns Hockey Club both play on the Astroturf pitches at the Blue School, where several other sports clubs are based. Wells Leisure Centre has a 25 m (82 ft) swimming pool, gymnasium, sports hall, sauna, steam room, relaxation area and solarium. The 18-hole Wells Golf Club is on the outskirts of the city and also has a 24-bay driving range with optional grass tees.

== In popular culture ==
Elizabeth Goudge used Wells as a basis for the fictional cathedral city of Torminster, in her book A City of Bells (1936), and its two sequels Sister of the Angels (1939) and Henrietta's House (1942: The Blue Hills, USA title).

Wells has been used as the setting for several films including: The Canterbury Tales (1973), A Fistful of Fingers (1994), The Gathering (2003), The Libertine (2004), The Golden Age (2007), and Hot Fuzz (2007, as Sandford). The cathedral interior stood in for Southwark Cathedral during filming for the Doctor Who episode "The Lazarus Experiment", and was also used as an interior location in the film Jack the Giant Slayer (2013), and in 2017 for the film Hellboy. In 2017 the market square and town hall was used for production of the BBC series Poldark.

== Notable people ==
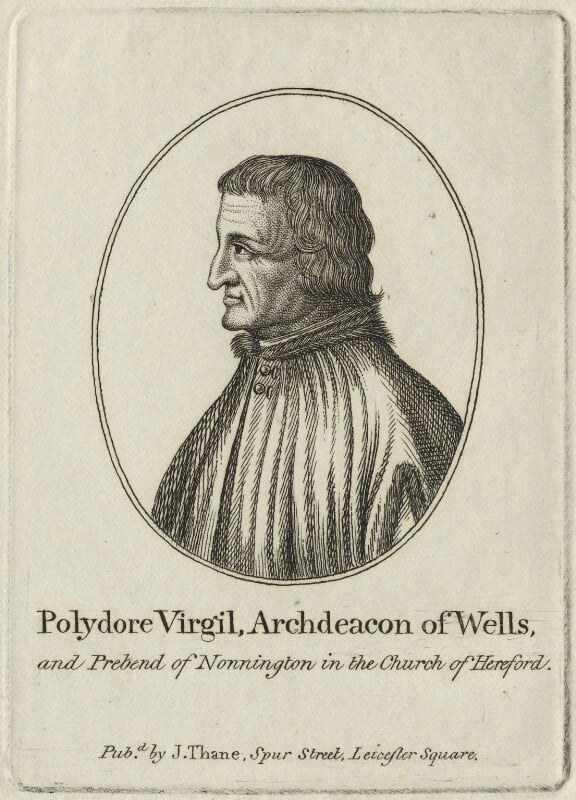
engraving of Polydore Virgil, from 1832

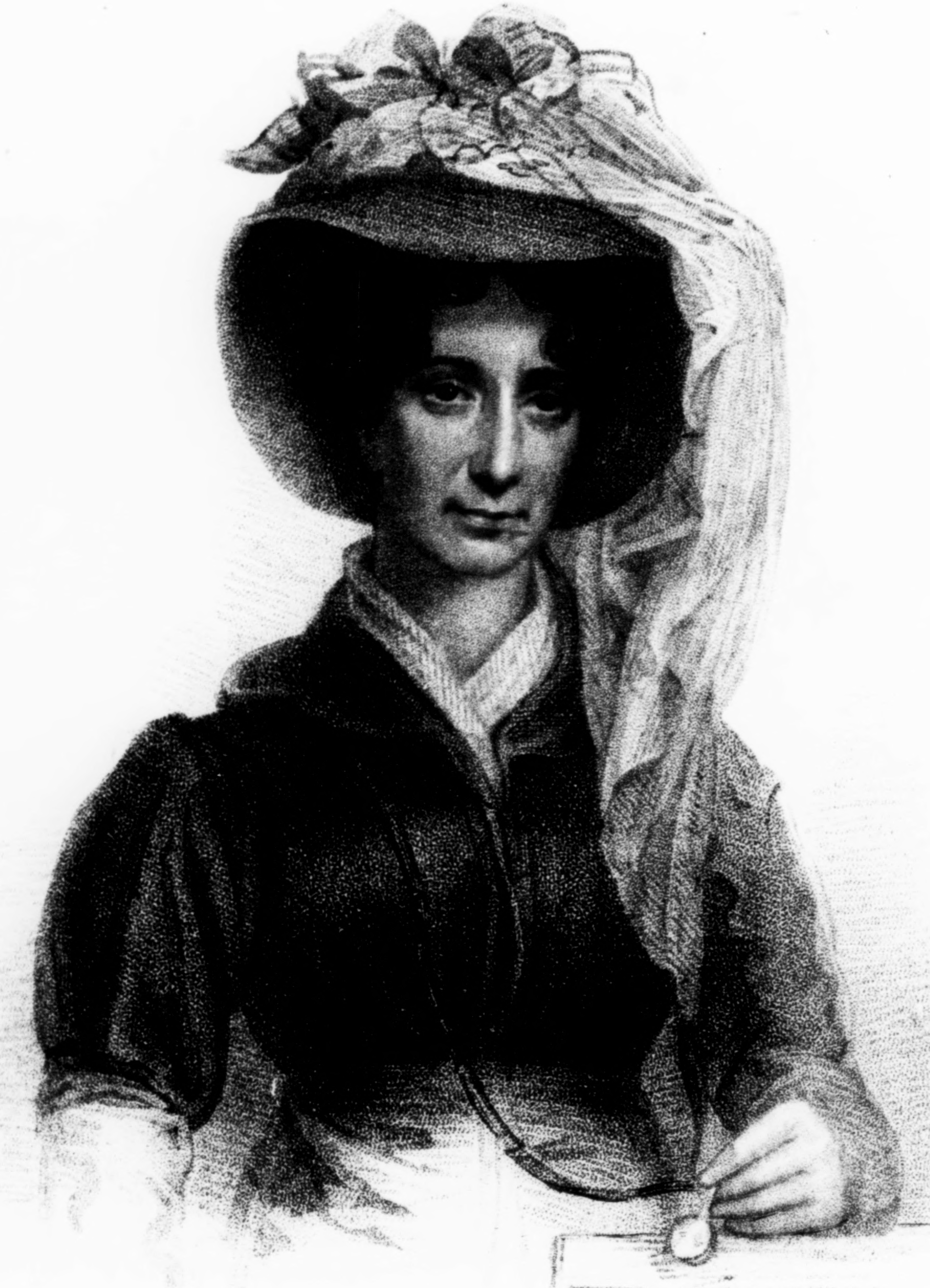
engraving of Elizabeth Benger from 1823

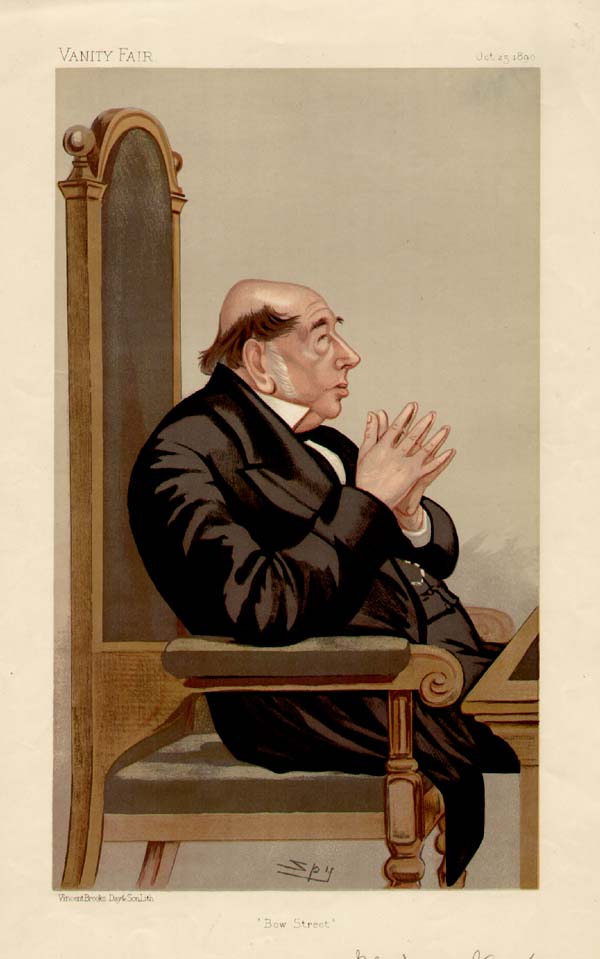
caricature of Sir James Vaughan, from 1890

- Simon of Wells (died 1207), Archdeacon of Wells from 1198.
- Hugh of Wells (died 1235), native of Wells, archdeacon of Wells, elder brother of Jocelin of Wells
- Jocelin of Wells (died 1242), native of Wells, bishop, aided in creation of Magna Carta and helped the construction of the cathedral
- Waleran de Wellesley (died c. 1276), judge in Ireland and ancestor of the Duke of Wellington
- Walter Giffard (c. 1225 – 1279), Lord Chancellor, Archbishop of York & Bishop of Bath and Wells.
- Polydore Vergil (c. 1470 – 1555), an Italian humanist scholar, historian, priest and diplomat; Archdeacon of Wells, 1508–1546.
- Bartholomew Clerke (1537?–1590), jurist, politician and diplomat; Archdeacon of Wells.
- John Gibbons (1544–1589), Jesuit theologian and controversialist.
- John Bodey (1549–1583), Catholic academic jurist and lay theologian; martyred, 1583, beatified, 1929.
- William Hart (1558-1583), an English Roman Catholic priest and martyr, beatified in 1886.
- Alexander Huish (1594?–1668), an English cleric, academic and biblical scholar.
- George Bull (1634–1710), an English theologian.
- Mary Hamilton (born c.1721-24), 18th century fraudster and cross-dresser, one of whose fraudulent marriages took place in Wells
- Sir James Eyre (1734–1799), an English judge.
- John Holloway (1744–1826), governor of Newfoundland (1807–1809) and Admiral of the Blue
- James Hare (1747–1804), politician, diplomat and wit.
- John Keate (1773–1852), headmaster at Eton College where he restored discipline with the birch.
- Elizabeth Benger (1775-1827), novelist and poet; some of her poetry had a strong social message.
- Thomas Welsh (c. 1780 - 1848), composer and operatic bass.
- Edmund Goodenough (1786–1845) an English churchman, dean of Wells, 1831–1845.
- Joseph William Moss (1803–1862), physician, wrote Manual of Classical Bibliography (1825).
- Sir James Vaughan (1814–1906), magistrate at Bow Street Magistrates' Court
- Alexander Davie (1847–1889), eighth Premier of British Columbia.
- Herbert E. Balch (1869–1958), archaeologist, naturalist, caver and geologist; eponym of Balch Road, founded Wells Museum in 1893.
- Harry George Crandon (1874–1953), awarded the Victoria Cross during the Boer War
- Harry Patch (1898–2009), last trench veteran of WWI, and aged 111, briefly the oldest man in Europe and 3rd oldest man in the world; born in nearby of Combe Down, died in local care home, Fletcher House.
- Elizabeth Goudge (1900–1984), author of novels, short stories and children's books.
- Christopher Hollis (1902–1977), teacher, author and MP for Devizes, 1945–1955.
- Sir Roger Hollis (1905–1973), director general of MI5
- Sir Chris Clarke (1941–2009), county councillor for Wells from 1985 to 2005
- Julia Somerville (born 1947), newsreader and journalist who worked with BBC and ITN; co-presenter of Rip Off Britain.
- Jan Faulkner (1953–2013), percussionist, composer and music teacher; she played in the Bournemouth Symphony Orchestra and taught music at Wells Cathedral School.
- David Poore (born 1966), musician, has composed and produced music for over 200 films by the BBC and other broadcasters.
- Kris Marshall (born 1973), actor, raised in the city and has lived there.
- Edgar Wright (born 1974), film and TV director, directed Hot Fuzz, which was filmed in the city.

=== Sport ===
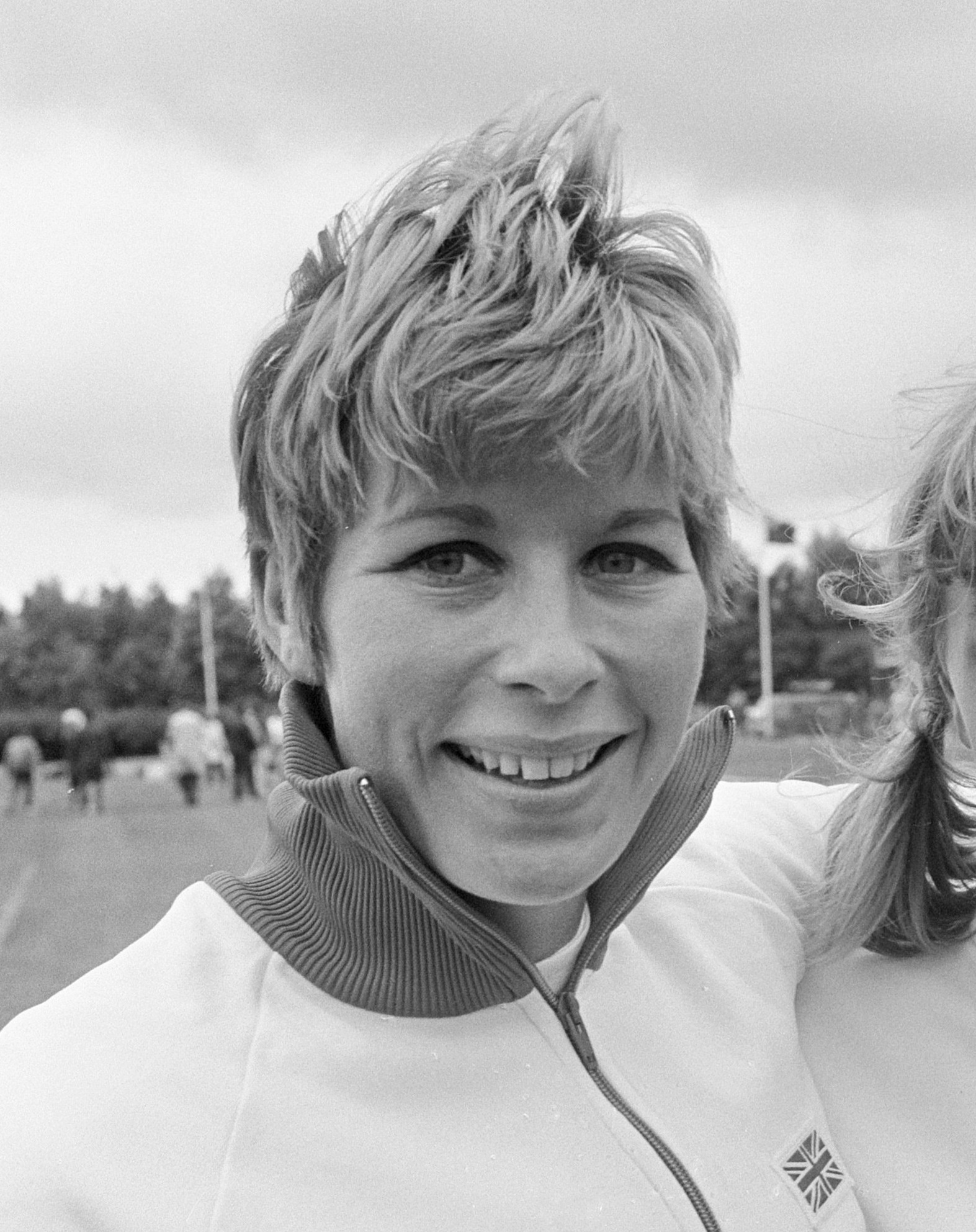
Mary Rand, 1966

- Trevor Jones (1920–2005), played 21 first-class cricket games for Somerset.
- Mary Bignall-Rand (1940–2026), gold medalist and world record breaker in the long jump at the 1964 Summer Olympics
- Jack Buckner (born 1961), athlete, gold medallist in the 5000 metres at the 1986 European Athletics Championships and silver medallist the 1986 Commonwealth Games and bronze medallist at the 1987 World Athletics Championships.
- James Keene (born 1985), footballer, played over 340 games including 123 for IF Elfsborg in Sweden
- Luke Wilkinson (born 1990), footballer who has played over 430 games.
- Annie Campbell-Orde (born 1995), a rower, team bronze medallist with the eight at the 2024 Summer Olympics.

== Arms ==
Coat of arms of Wells, Somerset
| Coronet A mural crown Or. Escutcheon Argent in base a mount Vert thereon an ash tree Proper between three wells Gules. Motto Hoc Fonte Derivata Copia (The Fullness That Springs From This Well). |

== See also ==
- Tourist attractions in Somerset
