= Robert Plane =

Robert Plane may refer to:

- Robert A. Plane (1927–2018), American chemistry professor and college administrator
- Robert Plane (clarinettist), British clarinettist
