= Philip Dukes =

British violist (born 1968)

Philip Dukes (born 1968) is a British classical viola soloist.

== Early life and education ==
Born in Birmingham, England, Dukes began his musical education at Wells Cathedral School in 1978.

In 1985 Dukes went to the Guildhall School of Music and Drama His principal teachers included Mark Knight, Yfrah Neaman and in New York, Michael Tree. In 2006 Dukes was unanimously elected as a Fellow of the Guildhall School.

== Career ==
Dukes' 1991 recital debut at London's South Bank was described as "world class" by the magazine The Strad. This performance launched a career that has led to Dukes being recognised as one of the foremost violists of his generation.

Many of Dukes' concerts in the 1990s were as one third of the Plane Dukes Rahman Trio, which received considerable critical acclaim.

Dukes' debut as a viola soloist at the BBC Proms at the Royal Albert Hall was on 2 August 1995 with the London Mozart Players conducted by Matthias Bamert, the program included Sally Beamish's Viola Concerto No. 1 world premiere. Dukes returned on 3 August 1999 with the BBC Scottish Symphony Orchestra conducted by Martyn Brabbins; he also featured as a soloist at the Proms on 4 August 2005 and 26 July 2007. The latter Prom included a performance of Sir Michael Tippett's Triple Concerto with the BBC Symphony Orchestra conducted by Sir Andrew Davis, a live recording of which is available on CD on Deutsche Grammophon.

Dukes was lent the Archinto Viola (one of only two remaining playable Stradivarius violas) in 2007 and for a 20th anniversary recital at the South Bank Centre in March 2011. Dukes' own viola was made by Japanese-American luthier Hiroshi Iizuka. There is a recorded interview hosted by The Guardian, comparing these two instruments.

Dukes can be regularly heard on BBC Radio 3, the highlights perhaps being the live broadcasts from The Proms. Dukes has appeared as a concerto soloist with many of the UK's leading orchestras and performs a wide range of engagements, from solos with major orchestras, to chamber music and music for films and TV.

== Discography ==
Dukes' most recent contributions to TV were as a member of The Locrian Ensemble of London who performed the original television sound track for the BBC production of Wolf Hall and Dickensian, both composed and conducted by Debbie Wiseman.

Dukes solo viola recordings with leading orchestras include, Arnold Bax's Phantasy recorded with the BBC Philharmonic Orchestra conducted by Sir Andrew Davis, released by Chandos Records; William Alwyn's Pastoral Fantasia recorded with the Royal Liverpool Philharmonic Orchestra conducted by David Lloyd-Jones released by Naxos Records, and Best of British 20th Century Classics, live from Royal Albert Hall during BBC Proms 2007 with the BBC Symphony Orchestra conducted by Andrew Davis, released by Deutsche Grammophon.

Other recordings include:

- Erwin Schulhoff: String Sextet Op. 45 Spectrum Concerts Berlin released by Naxos
- Benjamin Britten: Lachrymae with the Ayriel Ensemble on Ayriel Classics
- Ralph Vaughan Williams: Flos Campi with Northern Sinfonia and Richard Hickox
- Toru Takemitsu: A String Around Autumn with BBC National Orchestra of Wales, Tadaaki Otaka, conductor
- Geoffrey Burgon: Viola Concerto Ghosts of the Dance (2008) City of London Sinfonia, Nicholas Ward – leader
- Elegy for Viola and Orchestra: Lady Caroline Lamb (The Film Music of Sir Richard Rodney Bennett)with BBC Philharmonic and Rumon Gamba
- Benjamin Britten: Lachrymae with Northern Sinfonia conductor Steuart Bedford released by Hyperion Records
- Sally Beamish: Viola Concerto with Swedish Chamber Orchestra conductor Ola Rudner
- Frank Martin: Viola Ballade with London Philharmonic Orchestra and Matthias Bamert
- Hellawell: "Inside Story" (double concerto), with BBC Scottish Symphony Orchestra and Piers Hellawell
- Rebecca Clarke : Viola Sonata, Dumka, Chinese Puzzle, Passacaglia on an old English Tune Artists Dukes, Rahman, Hope, Plane
- Franz Liszt, F.: Berlioz – Harold en Italie and Romance oubliee Roger, K.: Viola Sonata artists Dukes, Lane
- Arthur Benjamin: Five Negro Spirituals, Sonatina for Viola and Piano, Pastoral Fantasy for String Quartet...artists Locrian Ensemble, Rita Manning & Steve Morris
- Mozart: String Quintets artists The Nash Ensemble with Dukes released by Hyperion Records
- Beethoven: String Quintets Op 4 & 29 artists The Nash Ensemble released by Hyperion Records
- Gabriel Fauré: Piano Quartet No. 1, Piano Trio artists Kungsbacka Piano Trio and Dukes released by Naxos
- Gabriel Fauré: Piano Quartet No. 2, Piano Trio (version for clarinet trio) 3 Romances sans paroles artists Kungsbacka Piano Trio, Dukes, Hosford
- Johannes Brahms : The String Quintets The Nash Ensemble with Dukes released by Hyperion Records
- Johannes Brahms : The String Sextets The Nash Ensemble including Dukes released by Hyperion Records
- Klein, Krása & Schulhoff: Forbidden Music from Theresienstadt Gideon Klein, Ervín Schulhoff, Hans Krása Artists Hope, Dukes, Watkins
- Beethoven: Contemporary Arrangement for Chamber Ensemble Artists: The Locrian Ensemble,
- Volkmar Andreae: String & Flute Quartets Artists: The Locrian Ensemble
- Volkmar Andreae: Volume 3 String Quartet in E flat, String Trio Op 29, Violin Trio Op 4, Six Piano Pieces Op 20 Artists: The Locrian Ensemble with Fali Pavri
- Richard Arnell: String Quintet Recorded at the Henry Wood Hall
- Walter Leigh: Complete Chamber Works Artists: The Locrian Ensemble Recorded at the Henry Wood Hall
- Alexander Borodin: String Sextet No.2 in D minor Alexander Glazunov: String Quintet in A, Artists The Nash Ensemble
- Felix Mendelssohn: Octet in E flat Op. 20, Artists The Nash Ensemble Recorded at the Wigmore Hall live
- Richard Strauss: Metamorphosen, Capriccio, Artists The Nash Ensemble released by Hyperion Records

== Academic roles and honours ==
In 2003 Dukes was appointed head of strings at Wells Cathedral School and in 2008 was appointed artistic director at Marlborough College. In 2006 Dukes was elected a fellow of the Guildhall School of Music and Drama and in 2007 was made an honorary associate of the Royal Academy of Music where he is a visiting professor of viola

== Personal life ==
Dukes married Caroline in 2002; they live in Marlborough and have two sons.
