= Ernest Parke =

English newspaper editor and local politician (1860–1944)

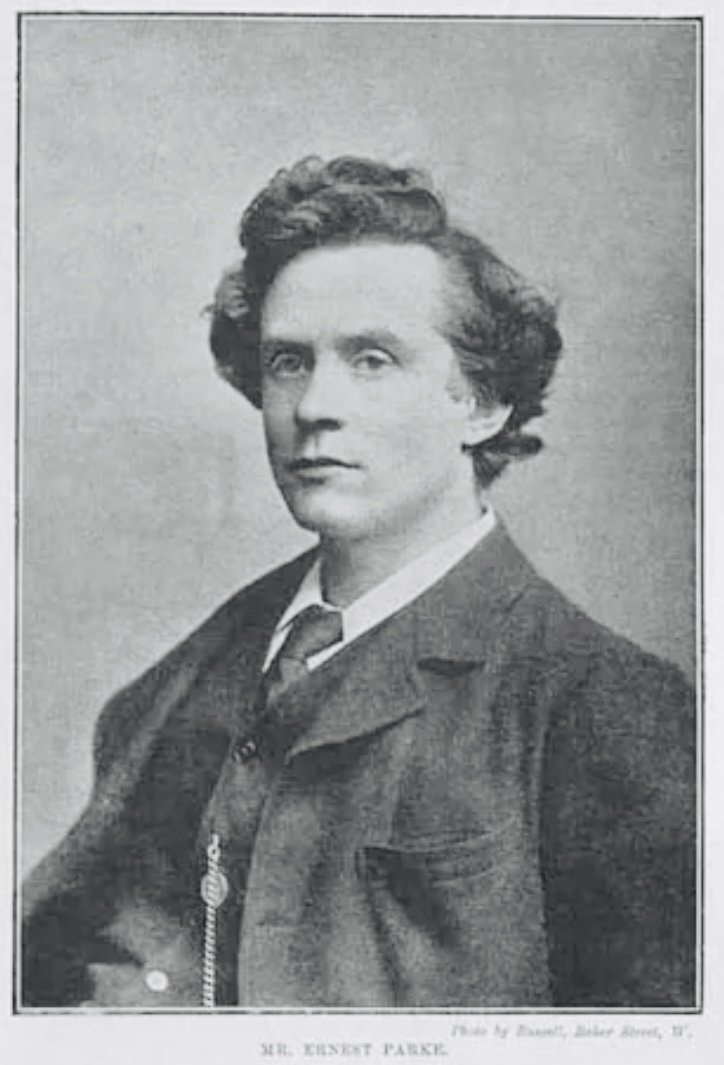
Ernest Parke in 1894

Ernest Parke (26 February 1860 – 21 June 1944) was a political writer, editor, newspaper proprietor and local politician. In 1890, as the editor of The North London Press, he was imprisoned for libel for his reporting of the Cleveland Street scandal.

== Early life and career ==
He was born in Stratford-upon-Avon in 1860, the youngest of four sons of Anne née Hall (1824–1902) and Fenning Plowman Parke (1826–1902), an Excise Officer. On leaving King Edward VI School he worked in a bank in Stratford-upon-Avon until 1882. Having started to contribute pieces on local topics to the local newspapers, he took up a position as a journalist on the Birmingham Gazette, followed soon after by The Midland Echo in Birmingham, later becoming an assistant sub-editor on that paper. He was editor of the financial newspaper Stock Exchange on Fleet Street, but not liking the work in 1884 he joined the staff of the Fleet Street evening paper The Echo. In the same year he married Sarah Elizabeth Blain (1863–1937). Herself a journalist, she after wrote under the pen name 'Mrs. Ernest Parke'. On the marriage certificate his occupation was recorded as 'Journalist'. Their sons were Fenning Matthew Parke (1885–1928) and Hall Parke (1905–1985).

In 1888, on the recommendation of John Richard Robinson, editor manager of The Daily News, he accepted from T. P. O'Connor the position of sub-editor of the newly formed The Star. He soon impressed O'Connor with his 'keenness, tremendous flair for news, and the capacity to work twenty four hours a day if necessary'. Later in 1888 he was appointed deputy editor of The Star. In the 31 August 1888 edition he suggested that Jack the Ripper, who had just murdered Mary Ann Nichols, was a single killer. He was editor from 1891 to 1918. At the same time he edited The Morning Leader, running the newspapers in parallel, and working "harder than any editor had done before or has done since".

Parke was one of the first editors to use stop press news, when he had racing results printed with a rubber stamp. He gained a reputation for supporting 'anti' movements: anti-vaccination, anti-vivisection, anti-protection, and anti the South African War. This last gained him the greatest radical recognition of having his newspaper burned on the London Stock Exchange. Despite his radical views, Parke was a foremost trusted adviser to the Liberal Party in its dealings with the press.

== Cleveland Street scandal ==
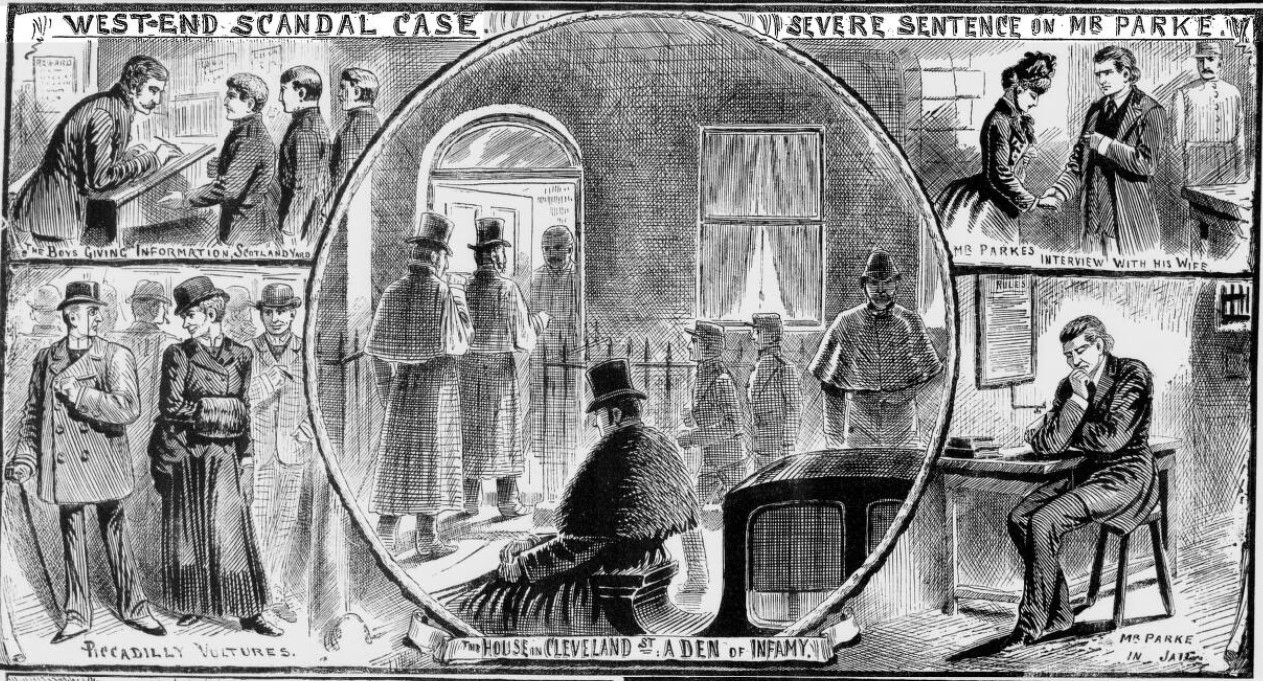
Scenes from the Cleveland Street scandal. Ernest Parke is shown on the right. The Illustrated Police News, 25 January 1890

In 1889 Parke was involved in the notorious Cleveland Street scandal when a homosexual male brothel and house of assignation on Cleveland Street, London, was uncovered by the police. At first the newspapers showed little interest in the story, which would have been quickly forgotten if not for Parke. As editor of the politically radical weekly The North London Press, Parke was first informed of police involvement in Cleveland Street when a reporter informed him of the conviction of the 18 year-old Post Office clerk and male prostitute, Henry Newlove. Parke began to ask why the male prostitutes involved had received light sentences with regard to their offence. His journalistic curiosity aroused, Parke discovered that the young male prostitutes had named leading members of the aristocracy as their patrons. Parke ran the story on 28 September 1889 hinting at their involvement but refrained from naming names. On 16 November 1889 he published a further piece which named Henry James FitzRoy, Earl of Euston, in "an indescribably loathsome scandal in Cleveland Street". Parke also alleged that Euston may have fled to Peru to avoid prosecution and that he had been permitted to escape by the authorities to conceal the involvement of a more highly placed personage; although this person was not named some believe that it was Prince Albert Victor, son of the Prince of Wales and grandson of Queen Victoria.

=== Trial for libel ===
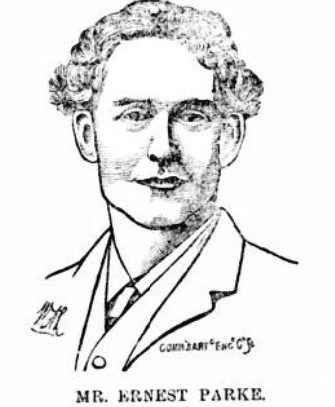
Ernest Parke during his trial. Leicester Mercury, 16 January 1890

Euston had not fled to Peru but was actually still in England when the article was brought to his attention and at once he filed a case against Parke for libel. Magistrate Sir James Vaughan issued a warrant for Parke's arrest on 23 November 1889 after Bow Street Magistrates' Court successfully proved the report against Euston to be libellous. Parke promptly turned himself into police custody. He had known for a week that he was likely be arrested and argued in his defence that he intentionally stayed in the country to accept the possibility of being charged with libel. Parke spent the entire weekend in jail and awaited trial for Monday morning. He meanwhile formed his defense team, consisting of Frank Lockwood, QC, and H. H. Asquith, who would later become Prime Minister during World War I. The hearing at Bow Street Magistrates' Court began on the morning of 25 November 1889. Vaughan set the bail at two securities of £50 each, which Parke posted.

Parke was widely regarded by his fellow journalists as the hero of the hour, victimised for telling the truth. With his 'pale, earnest, and intellectual face', The Illustrated Police News described him as looking 'more like a hard-working student than the defendant in a newspaper libel case', whilst also noting his popularity with the 'newspaper men, among whom he seems to enjoy warm popularity and substantial esteem'. At the preliminary hearing at the Old Bailey Parke pleaded not guilty to the charge of libel. Asquith argued that 'the alleged libel was true in substance and in fact, and that its publication was for the public benefit'. Lionel Hart, for the prosecution, did not counter, but 'applied for the postponement of the trial', because Parke's plea had only just been submitted. The judge in the case agreed, despite Parke being 'ready and anxious to meet the charge', and the case was set to 'stand over until the next sessions'. Parke was released on bail.

At the subsequent trial before judge Sir Henry Hawkins, for which Parke was remanded in custody despite having offered four sureties of £500 each, In court Euston admitted that as he had been passing along Piccadilly a ticket tout had passed him a card on which was written "Poses plastiques. C. Hammond, 19 Cleveland Street". Euston stated that he went to that address in the belief that Poses plastiques was actually a tableau of nude female. He paid an admission charge of a sovereign but upon entering he said he was appalled to discover the "improper" nature of the place and promptly left. The witnesses for the defence contradicted one another, and they could not accurately describe Euston. The last witness for the defence was John Saul, a male prostitute who previously had been involved in another homosexual scandal, this time at Dublin Castle. He also featured in a clandestinely published erotic novel The Sins of the Cities of the Plain, which claimed to be his autobiography. Delivering his testimony in a manner described as "brazen effrontery", Saul admitted to earning his living by leading an "immoral life" and "practising criminality", and detailed his alleged sexual encounters with Euston at the house. On 16 January 1890, the jury found Parke guilty of 'Maliciously publishing a false and defamatory libel' and the judge sentenced him to twelve months without hard labour in Millbank Prison.

== Later years ==
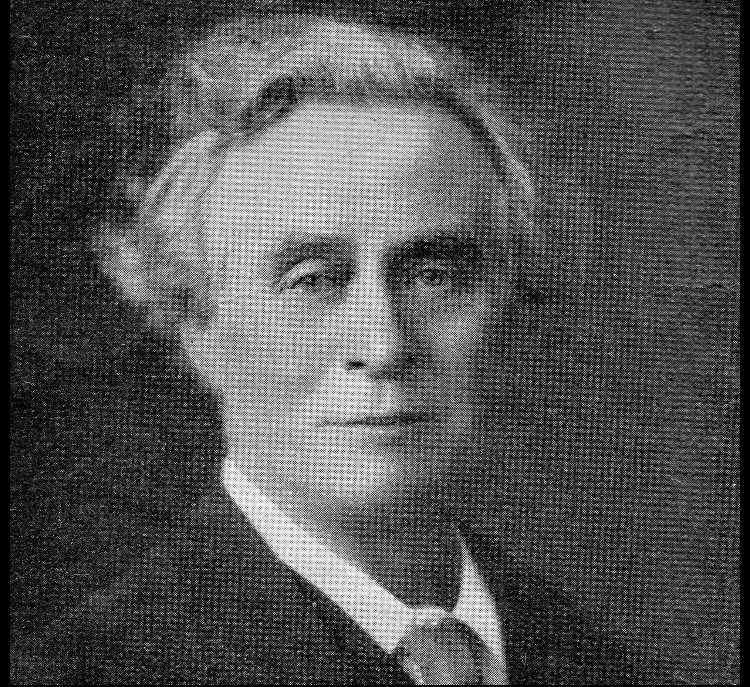
Ernest Parke in later life

Following representations by other journalists on his behalf to the Home Secretary Henry Matthews Parke was released from prison on 7 July 1890, having served half his sentence. He returned to The Star; he was editor from 1891 to 1918, when he resigned. Having retired from his editorial roles Parke increased his numerous business commitments. He sat on the boards of national and local newspaper companies, including The Daily News and The Star, the Northern Newspaper Company, and the Sheffield Independent Press. In 1904 he was a founding member of the Newspaper Proprietors' Association.

Parke was a Justice of the Peace (JP), an Alderman and for six years Vice-Chairman of Warwickshire County Council, which he first joined as a County Councillor in 1917. He successfully worked his farm Moorlands at Kineton in Warwickshire, which led to his becoming a member of the agricultural small holdings and the land cultivation committees of Warwickshire County Council.

Until his 83rd year he was physically robust and mentally alert, but during his last year his health began to fail and he gradually faded from the public life of Warwickshire. He died on 21 June 1944 at Warneford Hospital in Leamington Spa as the result of a fall at his home. He was cremated and his ashes were buried in the grave of his wife at the parish church of St Peter and St Paul in Butlers Marston. He left an estate valued at £34,625 8s. 1d (equivalent to about £1.3 million in 2026)
