= Wells Town Hall =

Municipal building in Wells, Somerset, England

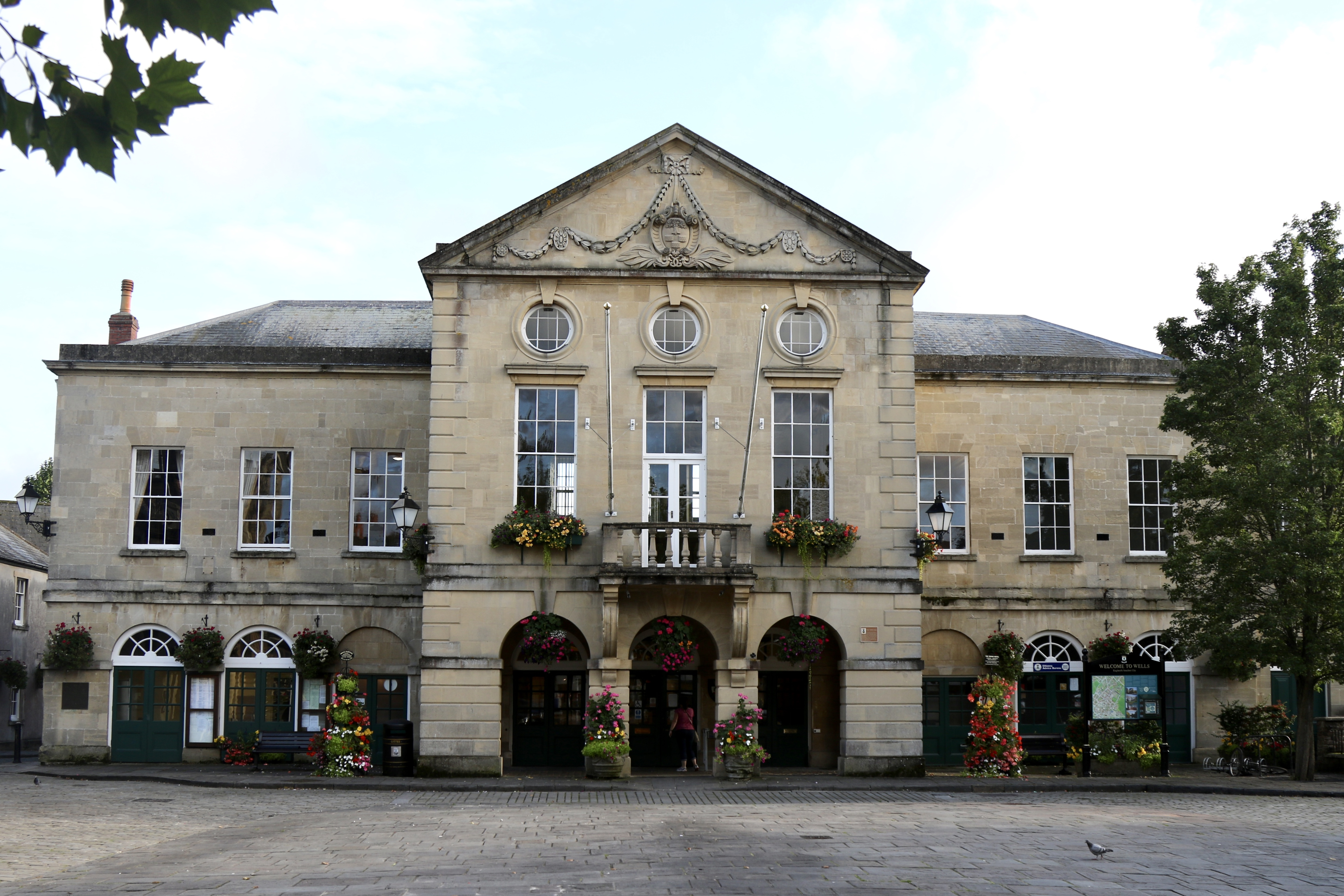
- Wells Town Hall

- Shown in Somerset
- 51.2089°N 2.6449°W
- Location: Wells, Somerset

History
- Built: 1779

Site notes
- Architectural style: Neoclassical style

Listed Building – Grade II
- Official name: Town Hall
- Designated: 12 November 1953
- Reference no.: 1383028

Wells Town Hall is a municipal building in the Market Place in Wells, Somerset, England. The building, which is the headquarters of Wells City Council, is a Grade II listed building.

== History ==
The first civic building in the market place, a market and assize hall, was completed in 1548. It was paid for in part by the Bishop of Bath and Wells, William Knight, and in part from a legacy left by the former Dean of Wells, Richard Woleman. After falling into a state of disrepair, it was rebuilt in 1663. It was at Wells assizes that, in the aftermath of the Monmouth Rebellion, Judge Jeffreys held the Bloody Assizes on 23 September 1685.

After the justices complained that the old market house and assize hall was cold and uncomfortable, civic leaders decided to procure a new building: the site selected, which was to the south of the old market and assize hall, had been occupied by a Canonical House used by former archdeacons. An Act "for building a new Assize or Town Hall and Market House, within the City or Borough of Wells, in the County of Somerset; and for regulating the Markets within the said City or Borough" was approved by Parliament in March 1779.

The new building which was built by Edmund and William Lush of Salisbury in the neoclassical style and paid for by public subscription was completed in late 1779. The design involved a symmetrical main frontage with nine bays facing onto the Market Square; the central section of three bays, which projected forward and featured arcading on the ground floor with tall sash windows on the first floor and a pediment above, was added in 1907. A French door and a balcony on the first floor and three oculi above were added in 1932. Internally, the principal rooms were the courtroom in the east wing, which was used as the court of assizes and later converted into a council chamber, and the courtroom in the west wing, which was used the magistrates' court and, after refurbishment, referred to as the "old courtroom".

The town hall served as the meeting place of Wells Municipal Borough Council for much of the 20th century but ceased to be the local seat of government when the enlarged Mendip District Council was formed in 1974. It then became the meeting place for Wells City Council, the local parish council for the area. The court of assizes continued to be held in the building until October 1970. The building also became an approved venue for marriages and civil partnerships in 1998 and magistrates' court hearings continued to be held in the building until 2010.

Works of art in the town hall include a portrait by Godfrey Kneller of King Charles II, a portrait by Peter Lely of King James II (as Duke of York) and a portrait by Anthony van Dyck of Bishop Robert Creighton, as well as a more recent portrait by Arthur Hayward of Admiral Sir James Somerville.
