= Hanging judge =

Judge who hands down harsh sentences

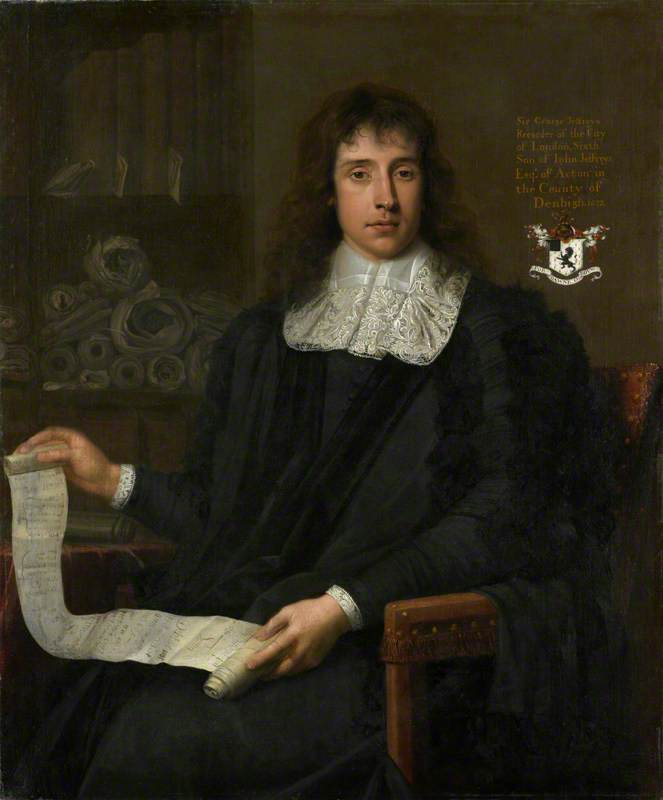
Portrait of Judge Jeffreys by John Michael Wright, 1675

A hanging judge is a judge who has gained notoriety for sentencing convicted persons to death by hanging, or otherwise imposing unusually harsh sentences. Hanging judges are officers of the court with mandates, as opposed to extralegal lynch law.

== History ==
Among the earliest known usage of the term was for Welsh judge George Jeffreys, who was notorious for his rulings during the Bloody Assizes. Hanging judges have become a fixture of American Wild West folklore, with Isaac C. Parker and Roy Bean among those most consistently cited. Parker sentenced 160 defendants to death during his 21 years at the federal bench, largely due to having jurisdiction over fugitives in the Indian Territory. Bean, although famously irregular in his administration of law, never had anyone hanged.
