= Rowdens Road Cricket Ground, Wells =

Cricket ground located in Wells, Somerset

Coordinates: 51.20260°N 2.65244°W

Rowdens Road
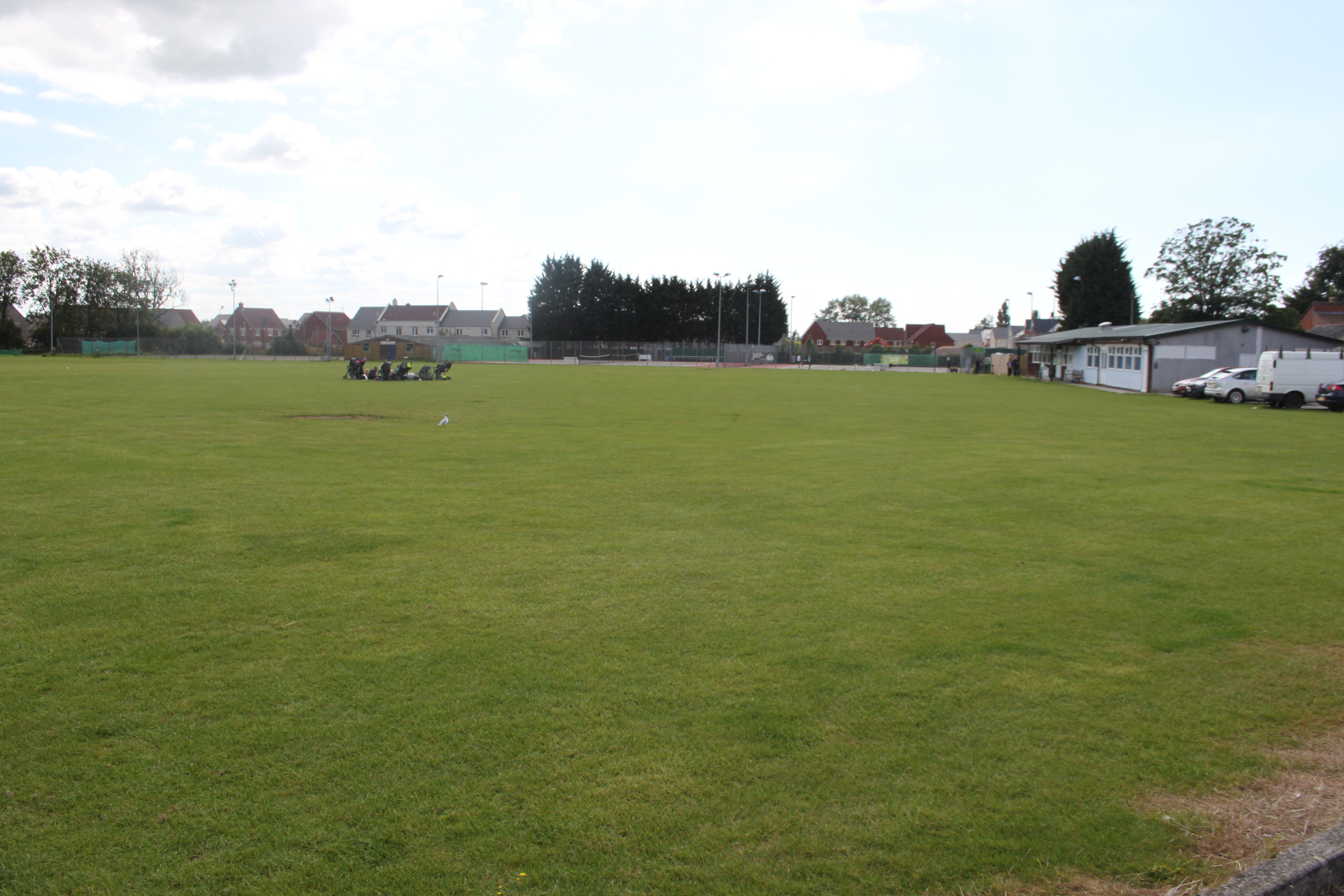
- Interactive map of Rowdens Road

Ground information
- Location: Wells, Somerset
- Establishment: c1879

Team information
| Wells | (c1879–c1894) |
| Somerset | (1935–1951) |
- As of 24 August 2010; Source: CricketArchive

Rowdens Road is a former first-class cricket ground located in Wells, Somerset. The ground was an early home to Wells Cricket Club, though the club no longer plays there (they are currently based in South Horrington). Between 1935–1939 and 1946–1951, the ground hosted annual Somerset County Cricket Club matches. In the first first-class match at the ground in 1935, Somerset were dismissed by Worcestershire for just 56; a factor may have been that the match was played under what Wisden Cricketers' Almanack termed "novel conditions". It went on: "There were no sight-screens, and the match details were broadcast from the scorers' box by means of a microphone and loud-speakers."

Wells City F.C. plays football matches at the site, which is a large area of sports facilities also including tennis courts.

== Note ==
Reference works including CricketArchive and ESPNcricinfo refer to the ground as "Rowden Road", though the street map of Wells shows clearly that "Rowdens Road" is the correct name.
