= Tim Thorpe =

Timothy Thorpe (born 3 October 1983) is a British horn player.

== Life and career ==
Thorpe was born on 3 October 1983. He attended Watford Grammar School for Boys, and was a member of the National Youth Orchestra of Great Britain, and the Gustav Mahler Jugendorchester. He attended The Purcell School for Young Musicians until 2002, when he won a scholarship to Guildhall School of Music and Drama, where he studied French horn with Hugh Seenan. Thorpe became principal horn with the BBC National Orchestra of Wales. In this position he was the soloist on Mozart's Horn Concerto No. 4, performed at the Teatro Colón in Argentina and broadcast by BBC Radio 3, and on other broadcast concerts. Thorpe has been a guest performer with major London orchestras, the New Zealand Symphony Orchestra, and Melbourne Symphony Orchestra, the London Sinfonietta chamber orchestra and the Nash Ensemble.

Thorpe has taught at the Royal Welsh College of Music & Drama, at Wells Cathedral School and gave master classes for Bromley Youth Music Trust, Music for Everyone and National Youth French Horn Ensemble of Great Britain.

== Discography ==
- 2006: Malcolm Arnold: The Complete Brass Chamber Music, with Fine Arts Brass. Nimbus (NI 5804)
- 2009: Midsummer. The Audio Concept (TAC002)
- 2011: Christopher Ball – Horn Concerto – Oboe Concerto, with oboist Paul Arden-Taylor, flutist Jonathan Burgess, clarinetist Leslie Craven, Emerald Concert Orchestra, Adderbury Ensemble. Musical Concepts (MC 143)
- 2018: Schubert: Schwanengesang – Brahms: Acht Zigeunerlieder – Arranged for French horn and piano, with pianist Christopher Williams. Naxos (8.573815)

== Awards ==
In 2004 Thorpe was a winner of the Royal Over-Seas League Annual Music Competition, and won the Royal Philharmonic Society's Philip Jones Memorial Prize.
