= James Vaughan (magistrate) =

Stipendiary magistrate (1814–20 May 1906)

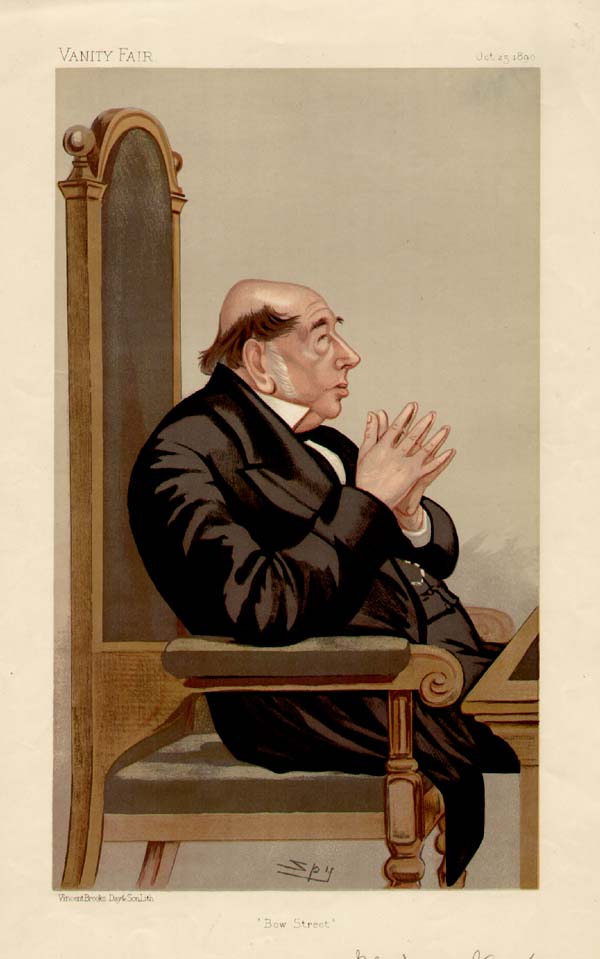
Sir James Vaughan in 1890. Caricature by Leslie Ward ('Spy')

Sir James Vaughan (1814–20 May 1906) was a long-serving stipendiary magistrate at Bow Street Magistrates' Court in London from 1864 to 1899. In 1897 he was knighted by Queen Victoria for services to the Law.

Sir James Vaughan was born in Wells in Somerset in 1814, the eldest son of Sarah and Richard Vaughan, a colliery inspector of Cardiff and Gelligaer, Glamorgan. After receiving his early education privately he proceeded to Worcester College, Oxford, where he took a third class in Lit. Hum. in 1834. Three years later he was called to the Bar at the Middle Temple. He was chief of the Commission of Inquiry into Corrupt Practices at Gloucester in 1859 and at Berwick-upon-Tweed in the following year, and in 1864 he was appointed magistrate of the Police Court at Bow Street. He received the honour of knighthood in 1897, the year of Queen Victoria's Diamond Jubilee, and retired from his work at Bow Street in 1899.

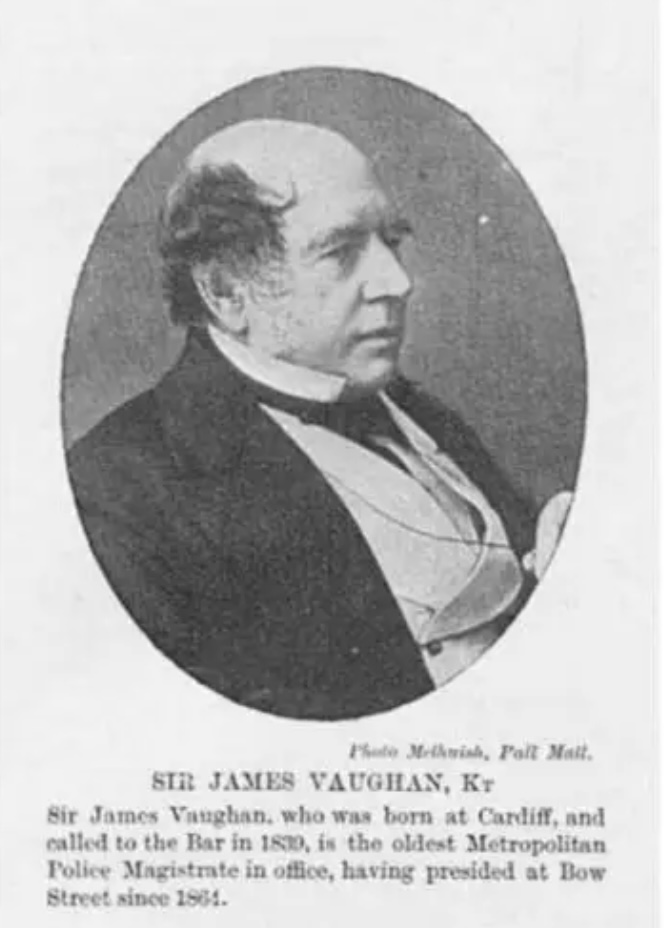
Sir James Vaughan in The Illustrated London News (1897)

Vaughan was twice married. In 1849 to Esther (1820-1850), one of eleven children of Martha Wood and Jacob Bright. Her brothers included the British Liberal politician Jacob Bright and the Radical and Liberal statesman John Bright. She died in childbirth in 1850, and her infant daughter Esther Bright Vaughan was in the care of her grandmother Sarah Vaughan, but the child died on May 5 1851 and was buried with her mother in the Bright family plot in Kensal Green Cemetery. Secondly, in 1854 he married Joanna Russell Smethurst (1824-1886), daughter of Mr. B. Smethurst, of Chorley. She died in 1886.

In 1889 he issued a warrant for the arrest of journalist Ernest Parke for his libel of Lord Euston during the notorious Cleveland Street scandal. In 1890 his caricature by Leslie Ward ('Spy') was published in the Men of the Day series in Vanity Fair.

His death took place at his residence, 121, Gloucester Terrace, Hyde Park in 1906. Sir James, who was in his 93rd year and had been in poor health for some little time, died in his sleep, death being due to heart failure. He was buried in his family plot in St Mary’s churchyard in Willesden. He was survived by his son Richard Smethurst Bertram James Vaughan (1855-1906) and his daughter Rosalie Blanche Vaughan (1859-1940).

At Bow Street Magistrates' Court, Robert Marsham, the presiding magistrate, referred to Sir James Vaughan's death. Speaking with considerable emotion, he said that Sir James was a most painstaking and careful magistrate in punishing the guilty and extremely kind and considerate to those who applied to him for assistance. His decisions were almost universally approved of, and were hardly ever upset. He was sure that all those who knew the late magistrate would deeply sympathise with his bereaved family. Mr. Harry Wilson, one of the solicitors practising at the Court, also spoke in terms of high praise of Sir James Vaughan as a magistrate, and referred especially to his generosity to the poor of the district.
