= Wells Cathedral School =

Cathedral school in Somerset, England

Location
- The Liberty; Wells, Somerset; England; 51°12′49″N 2°38′37″W

Information
- Type: Cathedral foundation school Private day and boarding school Public school
- Motto: Esto Quod Es ("Be What You Are")
- Religious affiliation: Church of England
- Established: c. 909; 1117 years ago
- Head Master: James Davies
- Gender: Co-educational
- Age: 2 to 18
- Enrolment: 700
- Houses: Ten
- Colours: Navy, gold
- Alumni: Old Wellensians
- Patron: Charles III
- Website: wells.cathedral.school

Wells Cathedral School is an independent co-educational boarding and day school for 2–18 year olds located in Wells, Somerset, England, which provides an all-round education alongside specialist music and chorister training. The whole School comprises Pre-Prep, Prep School, and Senior School, which includes a Sixth Form. The School is one of the five specialist musical schools for school-age children in the United Kingdom. The Headmaster, James Davies, is a member of the Headmasters' and Headmistresses' Conference.

== History ==
With links to a school founded in AD 909, Wells is one of the oldest extant schools in the world. The School admitted girls in 1969 and has over 700 pupils aged between 2 and 18. The School has a musical emphasis and specialises in combining high-level musical tuition with a general academic education, as well as sports.

Situated within the city of Wells, the School's boarding houses line the northern parts of the city and the Music School retains close links with Wells Cathedral. The Vicar's Chapel and Library in Vicars' Close was built c. 1424–1430. The lower floor was a chapel, with a spiral stair leading up to the library. It is now used by the School.

De Salis House and De Salis Cottage were built in the late 14th century. The Rib was built in the 15th century and is a Grade II* listed building. Cedars House was built in 1758 for Charles Tudway, the Member of Parliament for Wells and now forms part of the school. Claver Morris House was built as a canonical house in 1669 by Dr Claver Morris, while Plumptre dates from 1737 and was built for Dr Francis White. No.11 The Liberty was built as a Canonical house in the mid 18th century and it now forms part of Wells Cathedral Prep School. No 23 The Liberty was built in 1819 for the Chapter Clerk, William Parfitt, and the 15th century Polydor House formerly belonged to the organists.

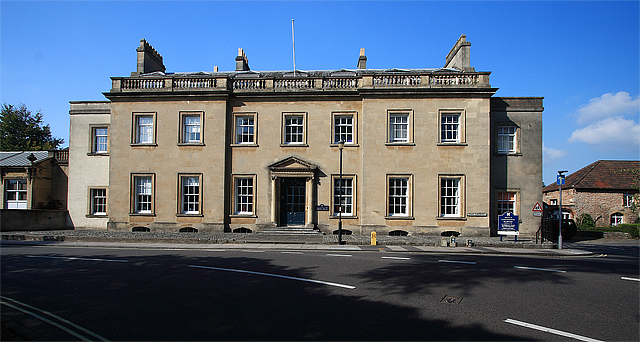
Cedars House

The red brick Cedars Cottage, which was built as a coachman's cottage the former stables and coach house were built in the mid to late 18th century, around the same time as Mullins. Ritchie House was built a little later around the end of the 18th century or the beginning of the 19th. Ritchie Hall became part of the School on its rebuilding in 1884 but incorporates part of a 12th-century Canon's Barn, while St Andrew's Lodge was built in 1713 as part of a charity school.

Wells Cathedral School is supposed to be the fifth oldest independent school in the country. It cannot be proved, however, that the School has existed continually since the date of its supposed foundation in the tenth century, and there was certainly a hiatus during the 1880s, after which it was re-founded.

The current Head Master is James Davies, with Jody Wells as Head of the Prep School, and Alexander Laing as Director of Music. Davies has been Head Master since September 2026.

The Royal Family holds links with the school, many of the buildings being opened by Queen Elizabeth, The Queen Mother on 6 July 1979. Queen Elizabeth II visited the school during her Silver Jubilee tour in 1977. The Countess of Wessex visited Wells on 18 October 2007 and has done so several times subsequently, including in September 2019 to help mark the 25th anniversary of the foundation of the Girl Choristers and the establishment of Cedars Hall.

In 1969 it was among the first independent schools in the country to become coeducational when the Prep School admitted girls. The following year, girls were admitted to the Senior School and it became fully coeducational.

In 2005, the School was one of fifty independent schools to be found guilty of operating a price-fixing cartel, discovered by The Times, under which schools had made fee increases or decreases concurrently, thus minimising competition. Each school was required to pay a nominal penalty of £10,000 and all agreed to make ex-gratia payments totalling £3 million into a trust designed to benefit pupils who attended the schools during the period in respect of which fee information was shared. The discovery by The Times was made shortly after new Office of Fair Trading directives prohibiting such sharing of information.

== Music ==
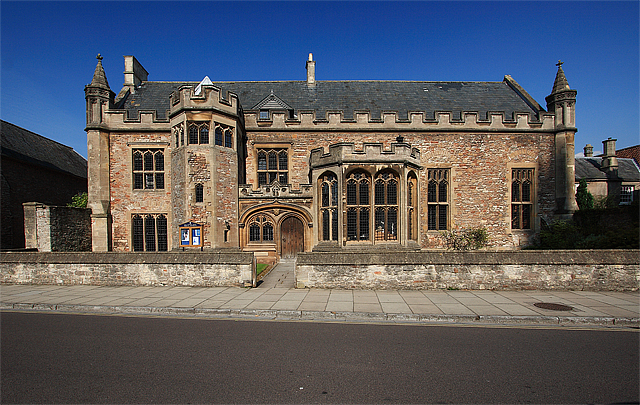
The Music School

Distinguished musicians visit the School to give masterclasses. The Music School has several main practice areas including the historic Vicars' Close, and caters for specialist, special provision and general musicians.

The Music School was formerly the house of the Archdeacon of Wells. It was rebuilt by Archdeacon Andrew Holes between 1450 and 1470, possibly retaining some 13th-century work and further restoration was undertaken by Edmund Buckle in 1886. It is a Grade II* listed building.

The renowned choral musician Peter Stanley Lyons was Director of Music and Deputy Headmaster of Wells Cathedral School, and Master of the Choristers at Wells Cathedral, from 1954 to 1960. The choral educator James William Webb-Jones was Headmaster of Wells Cathedral School from 1955 to 1960.

The school's connection with the cathedral offers a range of opportunities. There is a School service every Sunday evening and Monday morning in the cathedral, as well as music concerts. Chapel, chamber and cathedral choir rehearsals and performances are performed in both the cathedral and the Music School. Government funding of £3.5 million was obtained in 2008 to build a new concert hall and classrooms at Cedars Hall.

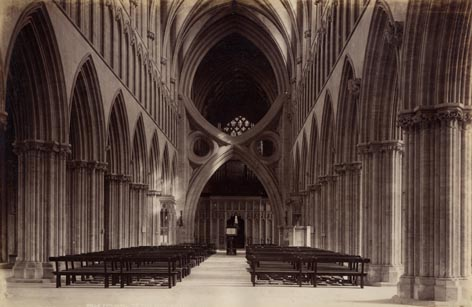
The nave and strainer arches of Wells Cathedral, c.1890

== Notable alumni ==
- Stephen Barton (born 1982), film and video game composer
- David Buckley, composer
- George Bull, Bishop of St David's
- Philip Dukes, violist
- Iestyn Davies, classical countertenor
- Michael Eavis, founder of the Glastonbury Festival
- Jan Faulkner (percussionist), staff member of Wells Cathedral School
- Emily Eavis, daughter of Michael Eavis, co-organiser of the Glastonbury Festival
- Richard Jacques, composer
- Frederick Keel, composer, singer and academic
- Kris Marshall, actor
- Justin Mortimer, artist
- Malcolm Nash, cricketer
- Danny Nightingale, Olympic gold-medallist
- Bruce Parry, BBC presenter
- David Poore, musician & composer
- Roger Saul (born 1950), businessman, founder of the Mulberry (company) fashion label
- Tim Thorpe, principal horn player (BBC National Orchestra of Wales)
- James Turle, musician
- Cian Ducrot, singer-songwriter

== See also ==
- List of Cathedral Schools
- List of the oldest schools in the United Kingdom
- List of the oldest schools in the world
