= Regal Cinema, Wells =

Former cinema in Wells, Somerset, England

Regal Cinema
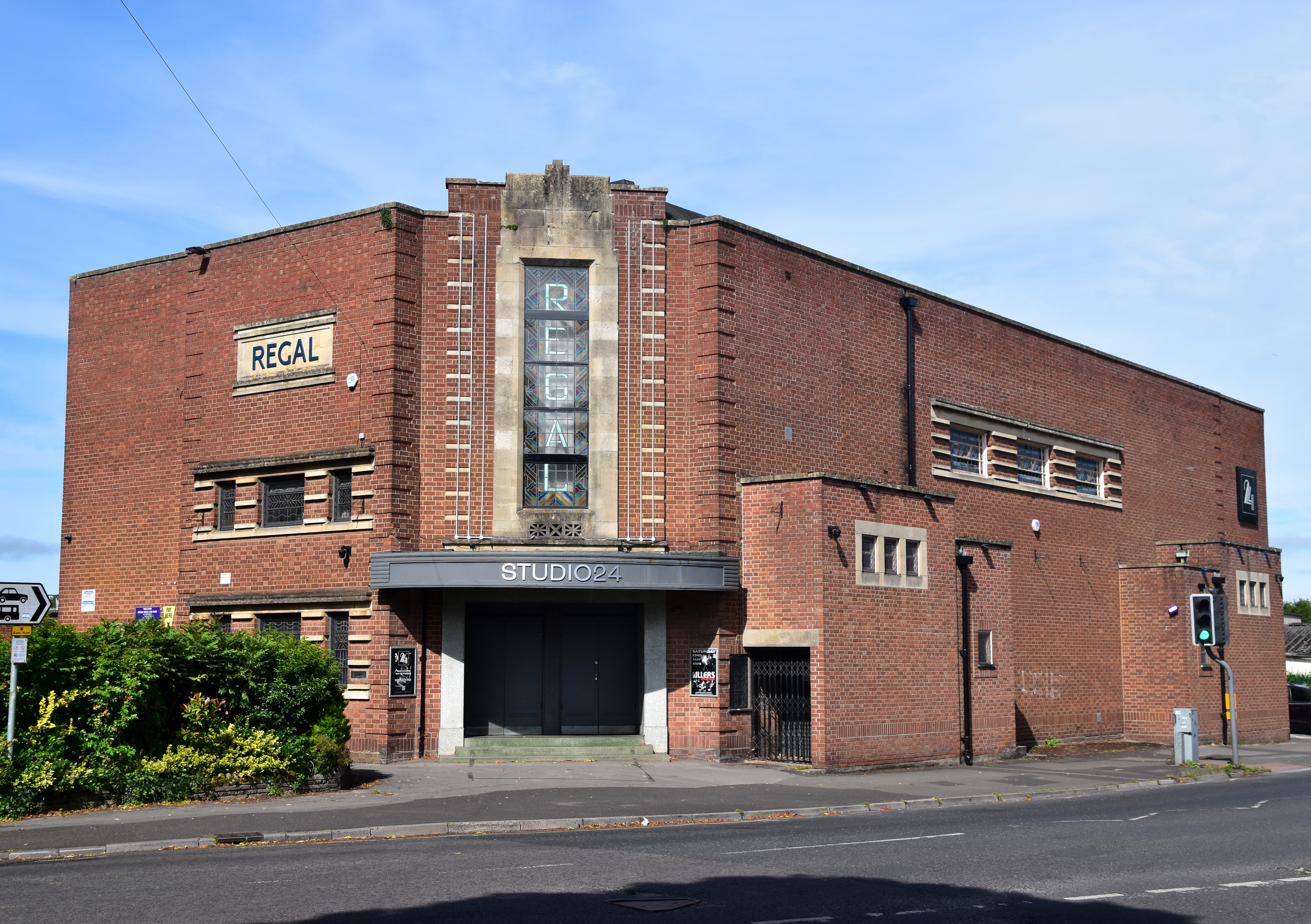
- The former Regal Cinema as Studio24 in 2026.
- Interactive map of the Regal Cinema area

General information
- Architectural style: Art Deco
- Location: Wells, Somerset, England, England
- Coordinates: 51.2064°N 2.6502°W
- Opened: 1935
- Closed: 1993

Design and construction
- Architects: Reginald O. Stiles, Ernest S. Roberts

Listed Building – Grade II
- Official name: Regal Cinema, Wells
- Designated: 18 December 1991
- Reference no.: 1383073

The Regal Cinema is a former cinema in Wells, Somerset, England. Built in Art Deco style, it opened in 1935 and screened its last film in 1993. The cinema was used as the Kudos nightclub from 2005 to 2024, and reopened as the music venue Studio24 in 2024. It has been a Grade II listed building since 1991.

== History ==
In 1934, Arthur H. Taylor proposed a new cinema for Wells to be built on a site on the corner of Princes and Priory Roads. The city already had a cinema, the Palace Theatre, but this was considered by the applicant to fail to meet the latest standards in design, comfort, and regulations. The plans for the new cinema were drawn up by the Wells architect and surveyor Reginald O. Stiles. Although Wells City Council approved the scheme, the Wells Magistrates refused to grant a licence for the new cinema.

The scheme was then picked up by Austen A. Pilkington, who already owned cinemas in Shepton Mallet and Devizes. He proposed using the same site and the same designs by Stiles, but with some amendments made by the Birmingham architect Ernest S. Roberts. Pilkington was granted permission to build the cinema by Wells City Council in March 1935 and Wells Magistrates approved a licence in April 1935.

Construction of the cinema was carried out in 1935, with the main contractor being W. E. Chivers and Sons of Devizes. The cinema was opened by Lieutenant-Colonel A. J. Muirhead on 12 November 1935. The first film to be shown was the American historical biographical Clive of India. The cinema had an original capacity of 588, with 426 seats in the auditorium and 162 in the balcony. It was also designed to be able to hold stage plays and had dressing rooms for such a purpose.

The cinema was taken over by the Birmingham-based Clifton Circuit in 1938.

From 1976, the Regal also held bingo sessions as film attendance figures were not enough to cover its expenses.

=== Redevelopment plans and closure of cinema (1990–1993) ===
In 1990, the owners, Somarea Promotions Ltd, were granted outline planning permission to convert the building into a mixed leisure complex, including a 180-seat cinema, a smaller 30-seat studio cinema for "less popular films", a nightclub/disco hall, shopping arcade and restaurant. In 1991, they proposed demolishing the cinema to make way for a petrol station, but this application was withdrawn in January 1992. Neither scheme came to fruition after the Regal was designated a Grade II listed building in December 1991.

In 1992, disagreements emerged between Somarea Promotions Ltd and Regal manager and operator Derek Cooper over the £5,500 that Cooper owed in rent. It resulted in Cooper being given a month's notice to quit and he responded by securing a lease from Mendip District Council for the former Boys' Club building next door and establishing the 150-seat Wells Film Centre there. Les Tracey, one of the three businessmen forming Somarea Promotions, then took over the running of the cinema himself. The Regal showed its last film, Beauty and the Beast, on 6 January 1993. Its closure as a cinema was blamed on the rising popularity of home entertainment, the general recession of the time, and the new competition from the Wells Film Centre.

=== Post cinema use (1993–) ===
After its closure as a cinema in 1993, the Regal continued to be briefly used three times a week as a bingo hall. In 1993, Somarea Promotions proposed transforming it into a nightclub, but Mendip District Council would only grant limited hours with the public entertainment licence, which the owners claimed made it economically unviable. Another proposal to transform it into a nightclub and cabaret club was rejected by Mendip District Council in 1995.

In 1995, the Regal was one of three sites being considered by Mendip District Council as a possible new home for the Wells Film Centre if Tesco's plans for a petrol filling station went ahead, which would have involved the demolition of the centre's existing premises for access purposes. By 1996, Tesco had made an offer to buy the centre and Mendip District Council hoped that the money raised would allow them to buy the Regal. The proposed petrol scheme did not come to fruition.

In 1997, Somarea Promotions proposed transforming the building into a children's activity centre with a film-theme restaurant, then they suggested another scheme in 1998 for the creation of a health club, which would involve constructing a steel-framed structure within the auditorium.

In 2004, the former cinema was converted into the multi-level nightclub Kudos, with work including an external and internal restoration. The nightclub closed after holding a New Year's Eve party on 31 December 2023–1 January 2024. On 28 March 2024, the building was reopened as Studio24, a live music and events venue. A £110,000 revamp included the installation of a new dance floor, a new bar, and new acoustics and lighting systems.

== Architecture ==
The Regal Cinema is built of red brick, with dressings and copings in local stone, over a steel frame. In their 1991 assessment, Historic England described the cinema as "particularly notable for the rare survival of its original colouring, decoration, seating and fittings".
