= Bloody Assizes =

English trials after the Monmouth Rebellion, 1685

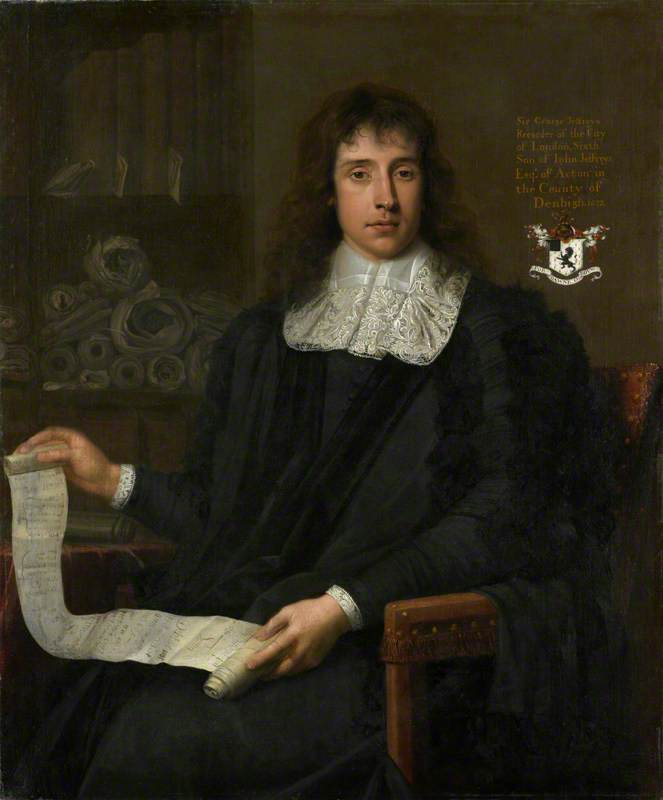
Portrait of Judge Jeffreys by John Michael Wright

The Bloody Assizes were a series of trials started at Winchester on 25 August 1685 in the aftermath of the Battle of Sedgemoor, which ended the Monmouth Rebellion in England.

== History ==
There were five judges: Sir William Montague (Lord Chief Baron of the Exchequer), Sir Robert Wright, Sir Francis Wythens (Justice of the King's Bench), Sir Creswell Levinz (Justice of the Common Pleas) and Sir Henry Pollexfen, led by Lord Chief Justice George Jeffreys.

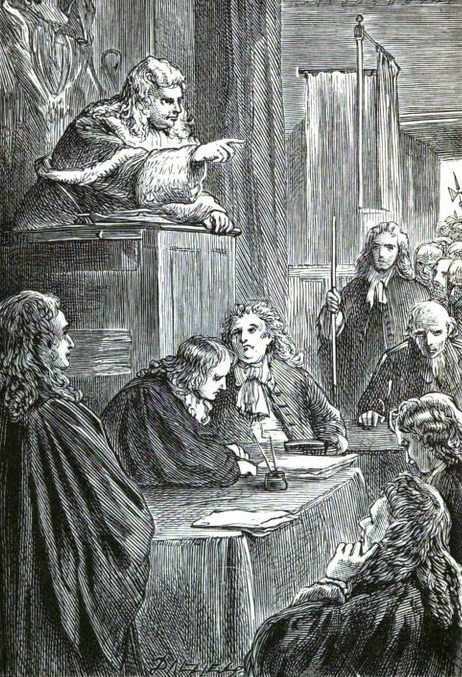
A 19th-century artist's impression of Judge Jeffreys presiding over the "Bloody Assizes".

Over 1,000 rebels were in prison awaiting the trials, which started in the Great Hall of Winchester Castle in Winchester on 26 August. The first notable trial was that of an elderly gentlewoman named Dame Alice Lisle. The jury reluctantly found her guilty and, the law recognising no distinction between principals and accessories in treason, she was sentenced to be burned. This was commuted to beheading, with the sentence being carried out in Winchester market-place on 2 September 1685.

From Winchester the court proceeded through the West Country, and conducted a brief hearing in Salisbury, where there were no rebels to be tried for high treason, on 1 September 1685. The court went on to the main centres of rebellion holding assizes at the Antelope Hotel in Dorchester on 5 September 1685, Exeter Guildhall on 14 September 1685 and the Great Hall of Taunton Castle on 17 September 1685, before finishing up at Wells Market and Assize Hall on 23 September 1685. More than 1,400 prisoners were dealt with and although most were sentenced to death, fewer than 300 were hanged or hanged, drawn and quartered. Of more than 500 prisoners brought before the court at Taunton between 17 and 19 September, 144 were hanged and their remains displayed around the county to ensure people understood the fate of those who rebelled against the king.

Some 800–850 men were transported to the West Indies where they were worth more alive than dead as a source of cheap labour. Others were imprisoned to await further trial, although many did not live long enough, succumbing to 'Gaol Fever' (typhus), which was rife in the unsanitary conditions common to most English gaols at that time. A woman named Elizabeth Gaunt was the last woman burnt alive in England for political crimes.

Jeffreys returned to London after the Assizes to report to King James, who rewarded him by making him Lord Chancellor (at the age of only 40), 'For the many eminent and faithful services to the Crown'. Jeffreys became known as "the hanging judge".

After the Glorious Revolution, Jeffreys was incarcerated "for his own safety" in the Tower of London, where he died in 1689. His death was probably due to his chronic medical history of kidney and bladder stones leading to an acute infection, kidney failure and possibly toxaemia.

Writing as recently as 1929, Sir John C. Fox said:

Even to the present day, the mothers of West Somerset control their unruly offspring by threatening to send for 'Judge Jeffreys'.

== See also ==
- Captain Blood (1935 film)
