= Jan Faulkner =

British percussionist, composer (1953–2013)

- Born: 1953
- Died: 14 December 2013 (aged 59–60)
- Education: Royal Northern College of Music
- Occupations: percussionist, composer, music teacher, member of music examination boards
- Employer: Wells Cathedral School
- Organization: Bournemouth Symphony Orchestra

Jan Faulkner (1953 – 14 December 2013) was a British percussionist, composer and music teacher. She played in the Bournemouth Symphony Orchestra, taught music at Wells Cathedral School and wrote compositions for beginners in percussion, double bass, and songs for children to sing on visiting historical places. She was an examiner for musical boards and taught international percussionists. Her music continues to be taught, in the UK and internationally.

== Life and education ==
Jan Faulkner studied percussion, timpani and piano at the Royal Northern College of Music, Manchester. She was appointed as the principal percussionist and timpanist of the Bournemouth Symphony Orchestra, whilst still a student, and played with the orchestra until 1985. Faulkner then taught at Wells Cathedral School for sixteen years. In 2003, she also became the first outreach officer of the school and made sustainable links between it and the local schools.

Her former pupils include Timothy Maryon, who worked in film and choreography and is percussionist for the London Soundpainting Orchestra, which performs with live sign language. Also freelance percussionist Alun McNeil-Watson, who was the first percussionist to be awarded a gala concert whilst at Wells, and went on to win awards as an international concert performer, and is also director of Box9Drumline. She commissioned works through the National Association of Percussion Teachers, including pieces by Peter R. Barclay, who has performed in major arenas such as O2 Arena with Andrea Bocelli. He worked with fellow ex-pupil Kim Foster on a piece dedicated to Faulkner.

Faulkner composed beginners pieces for percussion, which also had simple accompaniment, for teachers who were not pianists. She served on the examination boards for Guildhall School of Music (known as Trinity College, London), and prepared the timpani, snare drum and tune percussion syllabus, working with Michael Skinner and colleague, Jayne Obradovic. Her own works and pieces she arranged, continued to be included in percussion syllabus of the Associated Boards of the Royal Schools of Music (ABRSM) both during her tenure, and ten years after her death.

Faulkner composed songs for a national campaign Sing Up for primary school children, designed to catchy and easy to sing on visiting historical sites. These are now part of the campaign's song bank and still available for use.

Her works are taught and performed by young students in Malaysia.

== Works ==
- Simply Seven for snare drum, timpani, xylophone and piano
1. Crazy Cowboy, (ABRSM Grade 1 exam piece for tuned percussion)
2. Study in F
3. Study in G
4. Charlie's Caterpillars, (ABRSM Grade 1 exam piece for snare drum)
5. Joy to the World
6. Ship Ahoy, (ABRSM Grade 1 exam piece for timpani)
7. Queen's March
- Sing Up Songs: "Wonder and Mystery", "Pilgrim's Walking Song"
- First Bass, Music for beginner double bass and piano
- Second Bass, a series of short pieces for the progressing young bassist. includes an image of Faulkner.
- "Marching Together" (No. 2), "The Haunted House" (No. 3) in Double Bass Grade 1 syllabus of Music Teachers Board
- "Tango", performed in 2018 by students of Bentley Music Academy in Malaysia
