= Portrait of Judge Jeffreys =

Painting by John Michael Wright

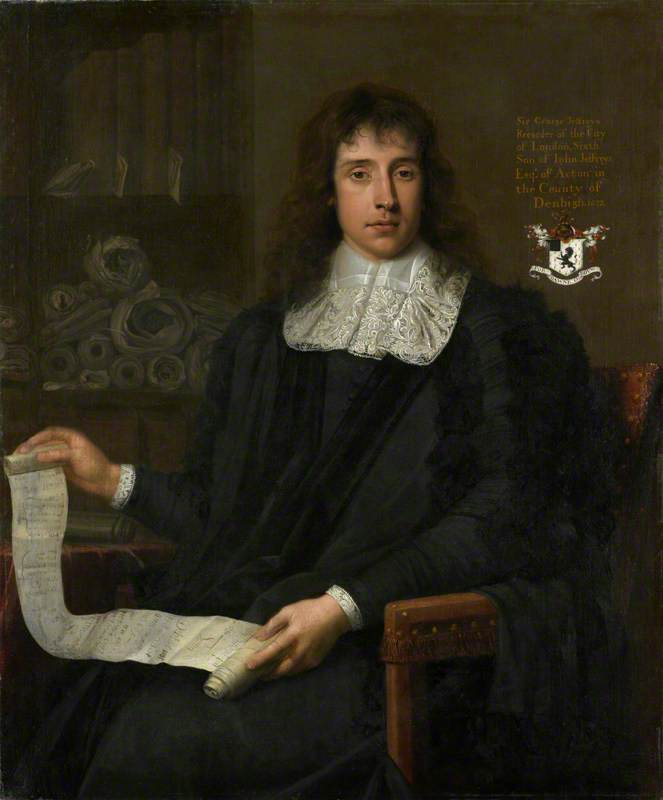
- Artist: John Michael Wright
- Year: 1675
- Type: Oil on canvas, portrait painting
- Dimensions: 121.3 cm × 101 cm (47.8 in × 40 in)
- Location: National Portrait Gallery; London

Portrait of Judge Jeffreys is a 1675 portrait painting by the British artist John Michael Wright. It depicts the Welsh lawyer George Jeffreys. During the reign of James II, Jeffreys became a controversial "hanging judge" for the harsh sentences he handed out. This was particularly the case in the aftermath of the Monmouth Rebellion of 1685. He died in the Tower of London in 1689 shortly after the Glorious Revolution that overthrew James. However, it has been noted that this, and other portraits, do not match the conventional popular image of the tyrannical Jeffreys.

Jeffreys is shown in the black robes of a serjeant-at-law holding a list of debtors. Today the painting is in the collection of the National Portrait Gallery in London, having been acquired in 1989.

== Bibliography ==
- Harris, Brian. Intolerance: Divided Societies on Trial. Wildy, Simmonds & Hill Publishing, 2008.
- Ingamells, John. National Portrait Gallery Later Stuart Portraits, 1685-1714. National Portrait Gallery, 2009.
