= Stop press =

Phrase

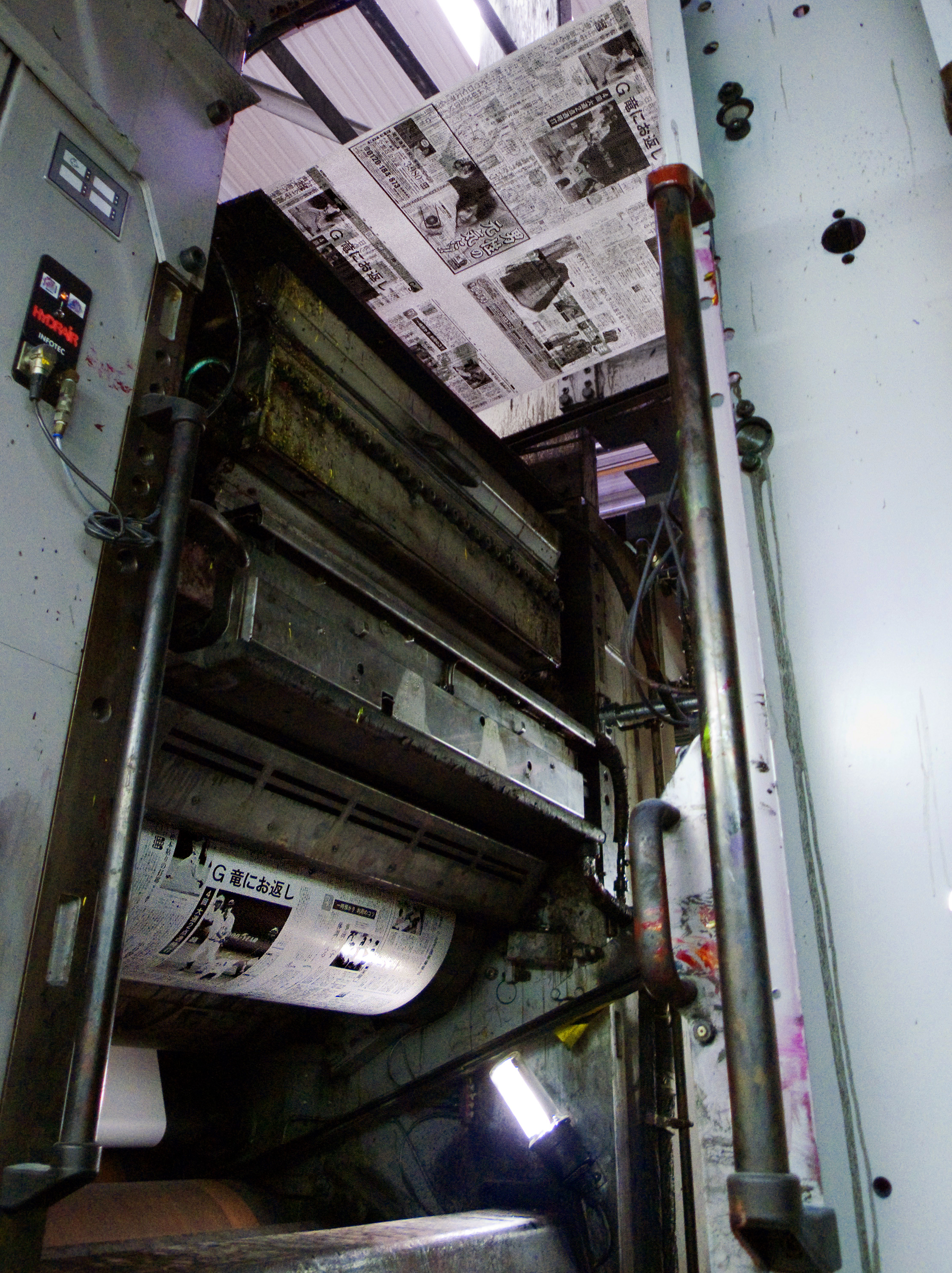
High-volume newspaper printing press

Stop press or stop the presses is an idiomatic exclamation when significant information is discovered.

The phrase stems from the printed news media industry. If the content of an issue needed to be revised just before, or during its printing the printing press was stopped and the content amended, such as by changing the plates or type, before restarting it. Reasons to stop the press might be to add a news item or correct an error. This could cause delay and expense, such as by necessitating that already printed copies be discarded, so was generally reserved for highly significant content changes such as the breaking of a very important news story.

== See also ==
- Breaking news
