= Robert Plane (clarinettist) =

British clarinettist

Robert Plane is a British clarinettist.

Plane won the Royal Overseas League Music Competition in London in 1992. He performed with the Zurich Chamber Orchestra, the City of London Sinfonia, Northern Sinfonia and the Malta Philharmonic. Plane has played with the London Symphony, Philharmonia, Royal Philharmonic and BBC Symphony Orchestras and with the Chamber Orchestra of Europe. He is the principal clarinetist of the BBC National Orchestra of Wales (since 1999). His performance of Rossini's Introduction, Theme and Variations was broadcast live on BBC from the 2004 The Proms in the Park. He teaches clarinet at the Royal Welsh College of Music and Drama, and is an artist-in-residence at Queen’s University.
