= Alfred Evans =

Alfred Evans may refer to:

- Alfred Evans (trade unionist) (1851/2–1918), British trade union leader
- Alfred Evans (cricketer, born 1858) (1858–1934), English cricketer
- Sir Alfred Evans (Royal Navy officer) (1884–1944), British admiral and cricketer
- Alfred John Evans (1889–1960), English cricketer, known as John Evans
- Alfred Evans (politician) (1914–1987), British Labour politician
- Al Evans (1916–1979), American baseball catcher and manager
- Alfred S. Evans (1917–1996), American viral epidemiologist
- Alfie Evans (footballer) (1917–1992), Australian rules footballer
- Alfred Evans (sailor) (1920–1998), South African Olympic sailor

== See also ==
- Evan Alfred Evans (1876–1948), U.S. judge
- Evans (surname)
