= List of provosts of Oriel College, Oxford =

This is a list of the Provosts of Oriel College, Oxford. The Provost is the college's principal, responsible for its academic leadership, chairing its governing body, and representing it in the outside world.

- 1326 to 1332: Adam de Brome – Almoner to Edward II and founder of college.
- 1332 to 1348: William de Leverton
- 1348 to 1349: William de Hawkesworth – also a Vice-Chancellor of the University of Oxford.
- 1349 to 1373: William de Daventre
- 1373 to 1385: John de Colyntre
- 1385 to 1394: John de Middleton
- 1394 to 1402: John de Maldon
- 1402 to 1414: John Possell
- 1414 to 1415: John Rote
- 1415 to 1417: William Corffe
- 1417 to 1421: Thomas Leyntwardyn
- 1421 to 1422: Henry Kayle
- 1424 to 1427: Nicholas Herry
- 1428 to 1435: John Carpenter
- 1435 to 1446: Walter Lyhert
- 1446 to 1449: John Hals
- 1449 to 1476: Henry Sampson
- 1476 to 1479: Thomas Hawkyns
- 1479 to 1492: John Taylor
- 1493 to 1507: Thomas Cornysh
- 1507 to 1516: Edmund Wylsford – also a Vice-Chancellor of the University of Oxford.
- 1516 to 1530: James More
- 1530 to 1538: Thomas Ware
- 1538 to 1540: Henry Mynne
- 1540 to 1550: William Haynes
- 1550 to 1565: John Smyth
- 1565 to 1566: Roger Marbeck – Chief physician to Elizabeth I.
- 1566 to 1574: John Belly
- 1574 to 1618: Antony Blencowe
- 1618 to 1621: William Lewis
- 1621 to 1644: John Tolson
- 1644 to 1653: John Saunders
- 1653 to 1691: Robert Say
- 1691 to 1708: George Royse
- 1709 to 1727: George Carter
- 1727 to 1757: Walter Hodges
- 1757 to 1768: Chardin Musgrave
- 1768 to 1781: John Clarke
- 1781 to 1814: John Eveleigh
- 1814 to 1828: Edward Copleston – Oxford Professor of Poetry 1802–1812, Bishop of Llandaff and Dean of St Paul's 1828–1849.
- 1828 to 1882: Edward Hawkins
- 1882 to 1905: David Binning Monro – Scottish Homeric scholar.
- 1905 to 1914: Charles Lancelot Shadwell
- 1914 to 1930: Lancelot Ridley Phelps
- 1930 to 1947: David Ross – Scottish philosopher, known for work in ethics.
- 1947 to 1957: George Clark – British historian.
- 1957 to 1980: Kenneth Turpin – Vice-Chancellor of the University of Oxford 1966–1969.
- 1980 to 1981: Michael Swann – molecular and cell biologist, Chairman of the BBC (1973–80), Principal of the University of Edinburgh (1973–80), and Chancellor of the University of York (1979–90).
- 1982 to 1990: Zelman Cowen – former Governor-General of Australia
- 1990 to 2003: Ernest Nicholson – former Oriel Professor of the Interpretation of Holy Scripture
- 2003 to 2013: Derek Morris – former chairman of the Competition Commission
- 2013 to 2018: Moira Wallace, former British civil servant, first Permanent Secretary of the Department of Energy and Climate Change.
- 2018 (current): Neil Mendoza, Baron Mendoza, entrepreneur, publisher and philanthropist.
