= William Evans (cricketer, born 1883) =

South African-born English first-class cricketer

- William Evans in 1913

Personal information
- Full name: William Henry Brereton Evans
- Born: 29 January 1883; South Africa
- Died: 7 August 1913 (aged 30); Farnborough, Hampshire, England
- Batting: Right-handed
- Bowling: Right-arm fast
- Relatives: Alfred Evans (brother); Dudley Evans (brother); Alfred Evans (uncle); John Evans (cousin); Ralph Evans (cousin)

Domestic team information
- Years: Team
- 1901: Worcestershire
- 1902–1905: Oxford University
- 1902–1910: Hampshire
- 1903: Marylebone Cricket Club

Career statistics
Competition	First-class
Matches	66
Runs scored	3,175
Batting average	29.12
100s/50s	5/18
Top score	142
Balls bowled	8,131
Wickets	175
Bowling average	26.00
5 wickets in innings	12
10 wickets in match	2
Best bowling	7/41
Catches/stumpings	61/–
- Source: Cricinfo, 1 December 2019

William Henry Brereton Evans (29 January 1883 – 7 August 1913) was a South African-born English first-class cricketer who played 66 times in the early 20th century. An all-rounder, he played county cricket for Worcestershire and Hampshire, as well as representing the Gentlemen against the Players, but he appeared most for Oxford University, whom he represented on 31 occasions. He scored nearly 1,800 runs, and took 120 wickets for Oxford. It was said in Wisden in 1914 that he was "one of the best all-round amateurs of his day," and that if he had played more regularly, it was "quite likely" he would have played Test cricket for England. Evans died in one of the earliest aviation accidents in August 1913, when he was thrown from Samuel Franklin Cody's prototype Cody Floatplane.

== Early life and education ==
Malvern College football team in 1900, with Evans 2nd from left on the back row

William Henry Brereton Evans was born in South Africa in January 1883, the oldest of five children born into a family with a long history in the colonial service in British India and South Africa, his grandfather William Evans was Deputy Surgeon General and Inspector General of hospitals in India in the mid-1800s.

Evans was educated in England at Malvern College, where he achieved notoriety as a schoolboy sportsman by representing the college in association football, cricket and rackets. He played for the cricket team from 1898 to 1901, and was described by the magazine Cricket in 1913 as "the best all-round cricketer Malvern College ever turned out". He captained the college in his final year, topping the batting averages and taking 53 wickets. Evans won the Public School Racquets Championship in 1900 alongside Basil Foster, with the pair defeating the Winchester College pair of Sydney Smith and K. G. Hunter.

== Cricket career ==
=== Early first-class career ===
During the summer which followed his final year at Malvern, Evans made his debut in first-class cricket for Worcestershire against Sussex at Worcester in the County Championship, making six appearances that season. He scored his maiden first-class century in his final match of the season, making 107 against Gloucestershire, whilst sharing in a partnership of 238 for the third wicket with R. E. Foster. From Malvern, he matriculated in the autumn of 1901 to Oriel College, Oxford. He played first-class cricket for Oxford University Cricket Club during his freshman year, debuting against H. D. G. Leveson Gower's personal eleven at Oxford in 1902. He played eight times for Oxford during his freshman year, gaining his blue that year by appearing in The University Match against Cambridge University at Lord's. Evans made his highest first-class score whilst playing for Oxford in 1902, with 142 against Sussex. That summer he qualified to play for Hampshire through the family home clause, by means of his uncle, Alfred Evans, living just inside the Hampshire county boundary with Berkshire. In July that season, he made four appearances for Hampshire in the County Championship.

Evans played the first half of the 1903 season for Oxford University, making nine appearances and once again playing in The University Match. During the latter half of the season, he played twice for the Gentlemen in the Gentlemen v Players match, in addition to playing for the Marylebone Cricket Club and C. I. Thornton's personal eleven, but did not feature for Hampshire. Although his batting form dropped away in 1903, he did have success with his right-arm fast bowling, taking 50 wickets at a bowling average of 18.08; he took five wickets in an innings on five occasions. Bowling performances of note included his 7 for 41 against Somerset, and his 7 for 52 in The University Match, in which he took 11 for 86 across the match and made a half century (60). He was appointed Oxford captain in 1904, though his bowling for Oxford somewhat fell-away, he did manage to average 54 with the bat from eight matches and saved Oxford from defeat in The University Match, by scoring two half centuries (65 and 86 not out). Later in the season he returned to play for Hampshire, making two appearances in the County Championship, in addition to playing for an England XI against the touring South Africans at Lord's.

Evans played his final season for Oxford in 1905, though he did not captain Oxford in the five matches in which he played, having been replaced by Kenneth Carlisle. For the only time he failed with the bat in that season's University Match, but did recover his bowling form to some extent across the season. He played for Oxford in 31 first-class matches, scoring 1,778 runs at an average of 34.19, making three centuries and thirteen half centuries. With the ball, he took 120 wickets at an average of 19.85, taking five wickets in an innings on ten occasions. His tally ranks as the sixteenth highest number of wickets for Oxford in first-class cricket. Whilst at Oxford, Evans also played association football for Oxford University A.F.C. for three seasons from 1902, where he played alongside another Old Malvernian, James Balfour-Melville. Evans also made five further appearances for Hampshire in the 1905 County Championship, and that season played for the Gentlemen in the Gentlemen v Players fixture, in addition to playing for the Gentlemen of England against the touring Australians.

=== Later career ===
An illustration of Evans batting (1905)

On leaving Oxford in 1905 Evans joined the Egyptian Civil Service which resulted in fewer opportunities to play first-class cricket, and causing him to miss the next three seasons. In Egypt, he served in Anglo-Egyptian Sudan, where he was a member of the Khartoum Province Polo Club. Had he continued regularly playing first-class cricket, Wisden considered it "quite likely that he would have had the distinction of playing Test cricket for England". This was a view which was also proffered by the magazine Cricket, despite noting that his success in big matches, such as in the Gentlemen v Players match, had been lacking. He returned to first-class cricket in 1909, making seven appearances for Hampshire in the County Championship, in addition to playing twice for the Gentlemen; in the first Gentlemen v Players match at The Oval, it was noted by Wisden that he had batted well. Across the season, he took 32 wickets at an average of 18.59, including figures of 7 for 59 for Hampshire against Gloucestershire, whilst with the bat he scored 360 runs at an average of exactly 24. After playing for the Gentlemen in July 1909, he would remain absent from first-class cricket for the next twelve months, before making two final first-class appearances for Hampshire in the 1910 County Championship against Yorkshire and Middlesex. For Hampshire, he made twenty first-class appearances, scoring 940 runs at an average of 26.85, while with the ball he took 45 wickets at an average of 33.13.

=== Playing style and statistics ===
His cricketing style was described by the magazine Cricket from a batting perspective as "a first-class batsman, with a fine pair of wrists, practically all the strokes on the book, and a marked inclination to get runs quickly whenever possible". It further described him as "a bowler of great potentialities, fast medium, with a high arm, an excellent and very easy delivery". Wisden described him as one of the best amateur all-rounders of his day, whilst noting that he was "a batsman of very high class". Across his first-class career, Evans made 66 appearances. In these, he scored 3,175 runs at an average of 29.12, scoring five centuries. He took 175 wickets at an average of exactly 26, claiming twelve five wicket hauls.

== Death ==
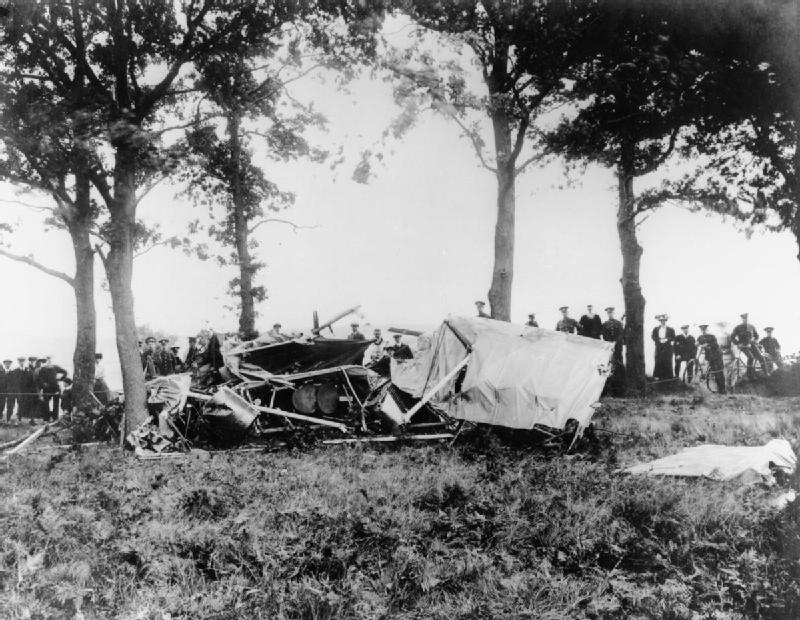
The wreckage of Evans' fatal air crash

Evans died on Laffans Plain near Aldershot in a flying accident, aged only 30. On 7 August 1913 he was a passenger of Samuel Franklin Cody when he was test flying his latest design, the Cody Floatplane, when it broke up at 200 ft (60.96 m), with he and Cody both being killed as they were thrown from the wreckage; neither Cody nor Evans were strapped in, and experts at the time surmised that if they had been, both men might have survived. Cody's stepson Leon King had given up his place on the flight to Evans. In September 1913, the cause of the accident was determined by the Royal Aero Club as an inherent structural weakness in the airframe. It was stated at the subsequent inquest that he had expressed an interest in becoming an aviator, having at the time been learning to fly.

Evans' funeral was held on 13 August 1913 at St Peter's Church in Tadley in Hampshire. Large crowds attended, drawn there because of the tragic circumstances of his death. His body had been cremated, an unusual choice at that time, but perhaps due to the horrific injuries his body had received during the flying accident. The casket containing his ashes was buried in a grave beside that of his grandmother, Emma Evans, who had died in 1911. Leon King, Cody's stepson, was among the mourners, as were Evans's family and friends, among the friends present was the former Hampshire cricketer William Jephson. The prayers of committal were read by The Reverend Lancelot Phelps, from Oriel College, which Evans had left only eight years before. He was survived by his brother's Alfred and Dudley, as well as his cousin's John and Ralph Evans, who all played cricket at first-class level. In tribute to Evans, A. J. Webbe wrote in The Times that he "was admired and beloved" by "every one who really knew him". Malvern College placed a stained-glass window in his memory in the chapel at the college.

== Works cited ==
- "Obituary". Cricket: A Weekly Record of the Game. Vol. 2 (51 ed.). London. 16 August 1913.
