= Englander (surname) =

Englander is a surname. Notable people by that name include:

- A. A. Englander (1915–2004), British television cinematographer
- David Englander (1949–1999), British labour historian
- Israel Englander (born 1948), American investor and hedge fund manager
- Ludwig Engländer (1853–1914), Austrian-born American composer
- Mitchell Englander (born 1970), American politician
- Nathan Englander (born 1970), American short story writer and novelist
- Peter Englander (1951–2023), British businessman
- Steven Englander (1961–2024), American art collective director
