= Charles Shadwell =

Charles Shadwell may refer to:

- Charles Shadwell (playwright) (died 1726), English playwright
- Charles Shadwell (Royal Navy officer) (1814–1886)
- Charles Shadwell (musician) (1898–1979), British conductor and bandleader
- Charles L. Shadwell (1853–1936), provost of Oriel College, Oxford
