= Alfred Evans (Royal Navy officer) =

English Royal Navy officer and cricketer

Vice-Admiral Sir Alfred Evans KBE CB
- Born: Alfred Englefield Evans; 30 January 1884; Cape Colony
- Died: 29 December 1944 (aged 60) at sea, over the Atlantic Ocean
- Spouse: Christina Evans (m. 1908–his death)
- Military career
- Allegiance: United Kingdom
- Branch: Royal Navy
- Service years: 1900–1944
- Rank: Vice-Admiral
- Commands: HMS Michael; HMS Termagant; HMS Seymour; HMS Vectis; HMS Exeter; Head of the Naval Technical Service (Ottawa)
- Conflicts: First World War; Battle of Jutland; Second World War
- Awards: Silver Medal of Military Valor
- Cricket career

Personal information
- Batting: Right-handed
- Bowling: Right-arm medium
- Relatives: Dudley Evans (brother); William Evans (brother); Alfred Evans (uncle); John Evans (cousin); Ralph Evans (cousin)

Domestic team information
- Years: Team
- 1919–1920: Hampshire

Career statistics
Competition	First-class
Matches	13
Runs scored	310
Batting average	14.09
100s/50s	–/1
Top score	77
Balls bowled	841
Wickets	23
Bowling average	36.56
5 wickets in innings	–
10 wickets in match	–
Best bowling	4/74
Catches/stumpings	10/–
- Source: Afred Evans at Cricinfo

Vice-Admiral Sir Alfred Englefield Evans KBE CB (30 January 1884 — 29 December 1944) was an English first-class cricketer and Royal Navy officer. In the Royal Navy, he served with distinction in the First World War and eventually rose to the rank of vice-admiral. Having retired just before the Second World War, Evans returned to service and became head of the Naval Technical Service in Ottawa. As a cricketer, he played first-class cricket predominantly for the Royal Navy and Hampshire. He was killed when the Avro 691 Lancastrian he was returning to the United Kingdom aboard crashed into the Atlantic Ocean.

== Early and family life ==
Evans was born in South Africa, the second son of Dr. E. W. Evans. He spent his formative years in South Africa before the family returned to England, where he was educated at Horris Hill School (which had been founded by his uncle Alfred Evans). From a cricketing family, both of his brother's, Dudley and William, played first-class cricket, as did his cousin Ralph Evans, whilst another cousin, John Evans, played Test cricket for England.

== Naval career ==
=== First World War and post-war service ===
After completing his education at Horris Hill, he joined the Royal Navy. He was taught aboard the training ship HMS Britannia, and was appointed a midshipman in 1900 on HMS Canopus. He was promoted to acting sub-lieutenant in 1901, with promotion to sub-lieutenant following in March 1903. In 1905, he was promoted to lieutenant, with Evans serving as flag lieutenant to Admiral Sir Wilmot Fawkes when he was Commander-in-Chief, Australia Station. He held the rank of lieutenant until September 1913, when he was promoted to lieutenant commander. Prior to the outbreak of the First World War, Evans was commanding Torpedo Boat Number 6, a Gadfly class torpedo boat.

Serving in the war, Evans was appointed flag-lieutenant commander on board HMS Orion to Vice-Admiral Sir Arthur Leveson in the 2nd Battle Squadron of the Grand Fleet. He saw action at the Battle of Jutland on 31 May to 1 June 1916, for which he was mentioned in despatches. He was promoted to commander in June 1917. In November of the same year he was decorated for bravery by the Kingdom of Italy with the Silver Medal of Military Valor. During the final year of the war, he commanded the destroyer HMS Michael. Following the end of the war in November 1918, Evans was appointed an OBE in July 1919 for his service during the war. After the war he commanded HMS Termagant, HMS Seymour, and HMS Vectis, before being placed in the Operations Division from 1922 to 1924. He was promoted to captain in July 1924, and as captain commanded the physical training school at HMNB Portsmouth.

Towards to the end of the 1920s, he served in South Africa as flag captain and chief-of-staff at the Cape Station and then as deputy director of Naval Intelligence. From 1930 to 1933, he was captain-of-the-fleet on the staff of both Admirals Sir Michael Hodge and Sir John Kelly on HMS Nelson. After a two-year appointment as commodore of the South America Division on board HMS Exeter, Evans was promoted rear-admiral in October 1935. That same month he was appointed naval aide-de-camp to George V. Having been second-in-command of the 1st Cruiser Squadron in the Mediterranean, he was rear-admiral in charge of Gibraltar from 1937 to 1939. He was appointed a Companion of the Order of the Bath in the 1937 Coronation Honours. Evans was promoted to vice-admiral in June 1939, at which point he retired from active service.

=== WWII service and death ===
Despite having retired two months before the outbreak of the Second World War, Evans returned to naval service as commodore of convoys, before being appointed head of the Naval Technical Service in Ottawa in 1940. In North America, he was a member of the Supply Council. He was appointed a Knight Commander of the Order of the British Empire in the 1943 Birthday Honours. Evans was the only passenger returning to the UK on a Canadian Government Trans-Atlantic Air Service flight which left Montreal bound for Prestwick on 29 December 1944. The Avro 691 Lancastrian which he flew on made a Mayday call 600 miles (970 km) east of Newfoundland and was lost with all hands. Rescue was attempted but no wreckage or remains were found. His name is recorded on the Chatham Naval Memorial. He was survived by his wife, whom he had married in 1908, and their two daughters.

== Cricket career ==
Evans was active in inter-services cricket and made his debut in first-class cricket before the First World War when he captained the Royal Navy against the Army at Lord's in 1914. Following the war, he returned to play first-class cricket for the Royal Navy in 1919, with Evans making three appearances for the Royal Navy that season, in addition to playing for a combined Army and Navy cricket team against a team of Demobilised Officers. He played three times for Hampshire in the 1919 County Championship, playing twice against Surrey and once against Gloucestershire, in addition to playing against an Australian Imperial Forces team. The following season, he played in three services matches, making two appearances for the Royal Navy and one for the Combined Services cricket team. He also played for Hampshire against Middlesex in the 1920 County Championship. A gap of five years followed before Evans made his final first-class appearance, in 1925 for the Royal Navy against the Army at Lord's. Making thirteen appearances in first-class cricket, Evans scored 310 runs at an average of 14.09; he made one half century, a score of 77 for the Royal Navy against the Army in 1914. As a medium pace bowler, he took 23 wickets at a bowling average of 36.56, with best figures of 4 for 74.
