= Post neoclassical endogenous growth theory =

Post neoclassical endogenous growth theory is a development of endogenous growth theory.

== Original use and mockery ==
The term was notably used in a 1994 speech by the Shadow Chancellor of the Exchequer, Gordon Brown.

The speech was written for Brown by his adviser Ed Balls. The use of the phrase by Brown was mocked by the Conservative Party politician Michael Heseltine who told the 1995 Conservative Party conference that the phrase was "... not Brown's, it's Balls!" Balls subsequently said in his 2016 autobiography, Speaking Out that he had tried to delete the phrase for the draft of Brown's speech. In the speech Brown said "You wouldn't expect me to talk to you about post neoclassical endogenous growth theory and I won't...".

== Analysis ==
The economist Robert Barro had been asked by the Financial Times to explain the meaning of the term in an article, and had been subsequently mocked for using the term by the Chancellor of the Exchequer, Kenneth Clarke. Barro subsequently said that "I suppose that I will never understand British humour".

The Provost of Oriel College, Oxford, economist Derek Higgins, wrote a poem about post neoclassical endogenous growth theory in the style of William McGonagall after The Guardian journalist Charlotte Higgns "floated the (im)possibility" of Brown writing such a piece. Higgins wrote that Morris's poem " ... apart from being a lot of fun, has one great virtue: it provides a very useful explanation of the point of economic theory under discussion".
