= James Innes =

James Innes may refer to:

- James Innes (author) (born 1975), British author
- James Innes (Canadian politician) (1833–1903), Canadian journalist and politician
- James Innes (British Army officer, died 1759) (1700–1759), British provincial officer
- James Innes (Virginia) (1754–1798), Virginia attorney general, politician and Continental Army officer
- James Innes-Ker, 5th Duke of Roxburghe (1736–1823)
- James Innes-Ker, 6th Duke of Roxburghe (1816–1879)
- James Innes-Ker, 7th Duke of Roxburghe (1839–1892)
- James Dickson Innes (1887–1914), British painter
- James John McLeod Innes (1830–1907), British soldier
- James Rose Innes (1855–1942), Cape Colony politician and South African judge

== See also ==
- James Ennis (disambiguation)
