= Ralph Evans (cricketer) =

English cricketer and geologist

Personal information
- Full name: Ralph du Boulay Evans
- Born: 1 October 1891; Newtown, Hampshire, England
- Died: 27 July 1929 (aged 37); Wheeler Ridge, California, United States
- Batting: Right-handed
- Bowling: Right-arm medium
- Relatives: Alfred Evans (father); John Evans (brother); Alfred Evans (cousin); Dudley Evans (cousin); William Evans (cousin)

Domestic team information
- Years: Team
- 1912: Hampshire
- 1913: Cambridge University

Career statistics
Competition	First-class
Matches	5
Runs scored	102
Batting average	34.00
100s/50s	–/1
Top score	70
Balls bowled	396
Wickets	5
Bowling average	45.40
5 wickets in innings	–
10 wickets in match	–
Best bowling	3/37
Catches/stumpings	1/–
- Source: Cricinfo, 30 January 2010

Ralph du Boulay Evans (1 October 1891 – 27 July 1929) was an English first-class cricketer and geologist.

The son of the cricketer Alfred Evans, he was born in October 1891 at Newtown, Hampshire. He was educated at Winchester College, where he played for the college cricket team. From there he matriculated in 1910 to Pembroke College, Cambridge. During the summer break of his second year at Cambridge, Evans made a single appearance for Hampshire against Essex at Leyton in the 1912 County Championship. The following season, he made three first-class appearances for Cambridge University Cricket Club against H. D. G. Leveson Gower's XI, the Marylebone Cricket Club, and L. G. Robinson's XI; in the latter fixture, he scored his only first-class half century, a score of 70. He played in his fifth and final first-class match in 1914, appearing for the Free Foresters against Cambridge University. In his five first-class matches, Evans scored a total of 102 runs at an average of exactly 34. With his medium pace bowling, he took 5 wickets with best figures of 3 for 37.

After graduating from Cambridge, he became a geologist at the British Geological Survey (BGS). With the First World War having begun shortly before his appointment to the BGS, Evans was commissioned into the 3rd Battalion, King's Shropshire Light Infantry as a second lieutenant on probation in November 1914. He became a prisoner of war during the conflict, and was interned in Switzerland, following an agreement between the warring powers organised by the Red Cross, which allowed captured personnel to sit out the war in Switzerland. At Mürren, he was chairman of the British Interned Mürren Ski Club and was also editor of the British Interned Magazine. Following the war, he was repatriated to England, becoming a fellow of the Geological Society of London in 1919. Evans was killed in a motor accident in the United States at Wheeler Ridge, California on 27 July 1929. His brother, John, was also a first-class cricketer, as were three cousins.
