= Jill Harries =

British historian

Jill Harries FRSE

Academic background
- Education: Somerville College, Oxford
- Thesis: Bishops, senators and their cities in southern and central Gaul, AD 407 to 476

Academic work
- Discipline: Late Antiquity
- Institutions: University of St Andrews
- Notable works: Sidonius Apollinaris and the Fall of Rome, Law and Empire in Late Antiquity, Law and Crime in the Roman World

Jill Diana Harries is Professor Emerita in Ancient History at the University of St Andrews. She is known for her work on late antiquity, particularly aspects of Roman legal culture and society.

== Career ==
Jill Harries studied Literae Humaniores at Somerville College, Oxford (1969–73) and completed her PhD in 1981. Harries was appointed Lecturer in Ancient History at St Andrews in 1976, and Professor in 1997. She served as the head of the School of Classics 2000-2003. Harries retired in 2013 and her retirement was marked by a conference in her honour.

Harries was a Kennedy Scholar at Harvard University in 1973-74, a Visiting Fellow at All Souls College, Oxford in 1996-97, and Bird Fellow at Emory University in 2003.

Known for her work on late antiquity, Harries has been invited to deliver a number of key lectures at international conferences, including the 2003 lecture Violence, Victims, and the Roman Legal Tradition at the Violence, Victims, and Vindication in Late Antiquity conference at University of California, Santa Barbara, and the 2014 public lecture East versus West: Sidonius, Anthemius, and the Empire of the Dawn at the Edinburgh University conference, Sidonius, his words, and his world: an international conference. Harries also serves on the board of editors of the journal Roman Legal Tradition.

Harries' book on Sidonius Apollinaris was the first in English since the 1930s and sought to embed his biography firmly in the history of 5th century Gaul. Her work on late antiquity in general has been widely read and reviewed, and forms a seminal part of the study of late Roman society particularly in regard to law and political structures.

Harries was elected a Fellow of the Royal Historical Society in 1986 and a Fellow of the Royal Society of Edinburgh in 2010.

Harries contributed to the 2001 episode on Attila the Hun for the documentary series The Most Evil Men and Women in History.

== Select publications ==
- with C Humfress, J Duindam, & N Hurvitz (eds) Law and Empire: Ideas, Practices, Actors (Brill 2013)
- Imperial Rome AD 284 to 363: The New Empire (Edinburgh University Press 2012)
- Law and Crime in the Roman World (Cambridge University Press 2007)
- Cicero and the Jurists: from Citizens' Law to the Lawful State (Duckworth 2006)
- Law and Empire in Late Antiquity (Cambridge University Press 1998)
- Sidonius Apollinaris and the Fall of Rome (Oxford University Press 1994)
