= Neil Mendoza, Baron Mendoza =

British businessman, academic administrator, and member of the House of Lords (born 1959)

The Right Honourable The Lord Mendoza CBE
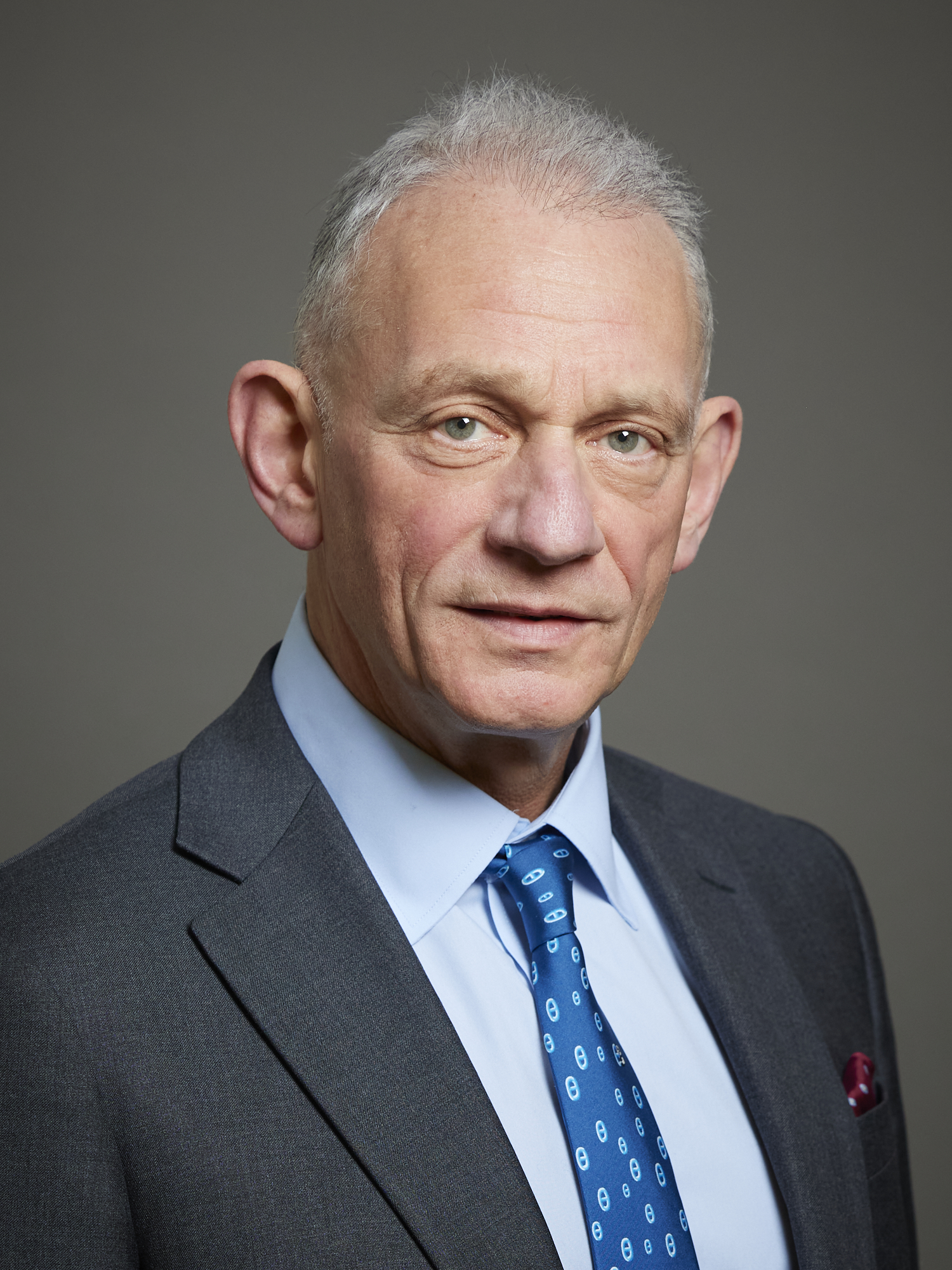
- Mendoza in 2024

Chairman of Historic England
- Incumbent
- Assumed office 1 September 2023
- Preceded by: Sir Laurie Magnus

Provost of Oriel College, Oxford
- Incumbent
- Assumed office 1 September 2018
- Preceded by: Moira Wallace

Member of the House of Lords
- Lord Temporal
- Life peerage 16 September 2020

Personal details
- Born: Neil Francis Jeremy Mendoza; 2 November 1959 (age 67) London, England
- Party: Conservative
- Spouse: Amelia Wallace (m. 1993)
- Children: 2
- Education: Haberdashers' Aske's Boys' School, Elstree
- Alma mater: Oriel College, Oxford

Neil Francis Jeremy Mendoza, Baron Mendoza (born 2 November 1959) is a British businessman, academic administrator, and member of the House of Lords.

Provost of Oriel College Oxford since September 2018, Lord Mendoza has also served as HM Government Commissioner for Cultural Recovery and Renewal since May 2020.

== Early life and education ==
Neil Francis Jeremy Mendoza was born on 2 November 1959 in London to Martin and Dianne Mendoza. Mendoza was educated at Haberdashers' Aske's Boys' School, Elstree, before going up to read geography at Oriel College, Oxford, matriculating in 1978.

== Career ==
After periods in banking and film finance, Mendoza co-founded Forward Publishing with William Sieghart in 1986. Forward pioneered the custom media business in the UK and became one of the leading independent contract publishers. The company specialised in international and multilingual projects with corporate partners including IBM, Tesco and Patek Philippe & Co. In 2001, Forward was sold to WPP plc.

Mendoza was appointed the UK Government's Commissioner for Cultural Recovery and Renewal in May 2020, and, on 31 July 2020, he was elevated to the peerage, taking his seat on the Conservative benches in the House of Lords.

During 2020, he played a leading role in the creation of the Department for Digital, Culture, Media and Sport £2-billion Culture Recovery Fund and is a member of its board.

He chairs the Culture and Heritage Capital Board. He co-chaired a report, Boundless Creativity, for the Department for Digital, Culture, Media and Sport and the Arts and Humanities Research Council.

In 2016, Mendoza was appointed as Commissioner of Historic England by the Department for Digital, Culture, Media and Sport, before being appointed as a DCMS non-executive board member.

In 2017, he published the Mendoza Review of Museums in England for the UK Government. In the same year, Mendoza was also the lead reviewer on the Strategic Review of DCMS-sponsored museums conducted under Cabinet Office guidelines.

The following year, he became provost at Oriel College, Oxford. During his tenure, in 2021, the college decided not to remove a statue of Cecil Rhodes. "What we are doing is not applying for it to be removed," he said. "The governing body has expressed a wish for it to come down, but in the current regulatory and legislative environment it's not going to be possible. This has been a careful, finely balanced debate and we are fully aware of the impact our decision is likely to have in the UK and further afield."

Lord Mendoza is currently Chairman of The Illuminated River Foundation. He is a non-executive director of Meira GTx, a gene therapy company with research facilities in New York and London. He sits on the Board of Visitors for the Ashmolean Museum.

In 2020, he was elected an Honorary Fellow of Trinity College Dublin.

He was previously Chairman of The Prince's Foundation for Children and The Arts, Vice-Chair of Soho Theatre, on the board of the Almeida Theatre and the Shakespeare Schools Foundation. He was also an independent trustee of The Daily Mail charity, Mail Force. Appointed to the panel of The Taylor Review: Sustainability of English Churches and Cathedrals, he was a judge of the Laurence Olivier Awards for theatre for 2010 and 2011.

Mendoza then served as Chairman of the Landmark Trust, a UK historic building preservation charity, from 2011 to 2021.

He was appointed Commander of the Order of the British Empire (CBE) in the 2023 New Year Honours for services to arts and culture.

In August 2023, it was announced that Mendoza had been appointed chair of Historic England. Describing it as "a great honour", he said: "I look forward to ensuring the ongoing protection of the nation's heritage estate and demonstrating the importance, beauty and value of our heritage to a wider society."

== House of Lords ==
In July 2020, it was announced that Mendoza had been nominated for a life peerage by Prime Minister Boris Johnson. On 16 September 2020, he was created a life peer with the title Baron Mendoza, of King's Reach in the City of London. He sits in the House of Lords as a Conservative Party peer, and made his maiden speech on 10 November 2020.

== Personal life ==
Mendoza married Amelia Wallace in 1993. They have a son and a daughter.

Academic offices
Preceded by Moira Wallace	Provost of Oriel College, Oxford; 1 September 2018 – present	Incumbent
Orders of precedence in the United Kingdom
Preceded by The Lord Lancaster of Kimbolton	Gentlemen; Baron Mendoza	Followed by The Lord Moore of Etchingham
