= Dudley Evans (cricketer) =

English cricketer and soldier

Personal information
- Full name: Dudley MacNeil Evans
- Born: 1 December 1886; Cape Colony
- Died: 18 December 1972 (aged 86); Petersfield, Hampshire, England
- Batting: Right-handed
- Bowling: Right-arm fast-medium
- Relatives: Alfred Evans (brother); William Evans (brother); Alfred Evans (uncle); John Evans (cousin); Ralph Evans (cousin)

Domestic team information
- Years: Team
- 1904–1911: Hampshire

Career statistics
Competition	First-class
Matches	16
Runs scored	382
Batting average	14.69
100s/50s	–/2
Top score	64
Balls bowled	2,240
Wickets	55
Bowling average	26.34
5 wickets in innings	4
10 wickets in match	–
Best bowling	6/81
Catches/stumpings	17/–
- Source: Cricinfo, 15 February 2010

Dudley MacNeil Evans MC (1 December 1886 — 18 December 1972) was an English first-class cricketer and British Indian Army officer. A member of the Evans cricketing family, he played first-class cricket for Hampshire in 1904 and 1905, before appearing for the county in 1911, a season in which he took 50 wickets. The six-year break in his first-class career was due to his commitments as an officer in the British Indian Army. His military career spanned from 1906 to 1939, during which he served in the First World War and was awarded the Military Cross.

== Early life and first-class cricket ==
The son of Evan Evans, he was born in the Cape Colony in December 1886. He was educated at Winchester College and while in his final year, he trialled with Hampshire County Cricket Club, making his debut in first-class cricket against Sussex at Hove in the 1904 County Championship. From Winchester, he proceeded to the Royal Military College, Sandhurst from where he graduated in August 1906 as a second lieutenant onto the unattached list, with a view to being appointed to the British Indian Army. While enrolled at the college, Evans made three first-class appearances for Hampshire in the 1905 County Championship. With his appointment to the British Indian Army in October 1907, he temporarily ceased playing for Hampshire while posted to British India. He returned to England in 1911 and resumed his first-class career, making an additional eleven appearances for Hampshire in the County Championship, but did not play for the county following the season. Making fifteen first-class appearances for Hampshire, Evans scored 361 runs at an average of 15.04, with two half centuries and a highest score of 64. In the field, he took 16 catches. As a right-arm fast-medium bowler, he took 50 wickets at a bowling average of 27.56; he took three five wicket hauls for Hampshire, with best figures of 6 for 81 against Derbyshire in 1911. He had a successful season in 1911 as a bowler, claiming 50 of his 55 career wickets. In addition to playing first-class cricket for Hampshire, Evans also made a single appearance for H. D. G. Leveson Gower's XI against Cambridge University at Eastbourne in 1911, a match in which he took figures of 5 for 56 in the university second innings.

== WWI service and later life ==
With the resumption of his military duties in 1912, his first-class career came to a final end. Evans served in the First World War, seeing action early in the war with the 55th Coke's Rifles (Frontier Force) with the rank of lieutenant. In August 1915, he was promoted to captain. He was awarded the Military Cross in April 1917, for conspicuous gallantry and devotion to duty during the Mesopotamian campaign while commanding the firing line for five hours whilst he himself was wounded. Following the end of the war, Evans was decorated in February 1920 by the Republic of Panama with the Medal of La Solidaridad, 3rd Class. He later served with the 13th Indian Infantry Brigade, being appointed to the brigade's staff in June 1921, a post he relinquished the following year. In September 1924, he was appointed to the rank of brigade major, before being promoted to lieutenant colonel in January 1932. His final promotion to colonel came in January 1936, before retiring from active service in April 1939. In retirement, he lived at Petersfield in Hampshire, where he died in December 1972. Several family members were also first-class cricketers, these included his brothers Alfred and William, in addition to two cousins and one uncle.
