= Andrew Stuart Winckler =

- Born: 8 January 1949; Bedfordshire
- Died: 15 January 2007 (aged 58); London
- Education: Bedford Modern School
- Alma mater: Christ's College, Cambridge
- Occupation: Economist
- Known for: First Secretary to the British Embassy, Washington (1978-81); Chief Executive of the Financial Services Authority (1996-98); Trustee of the Kennedy Memorial Trust (1998-2003)

Andrew Stuart Winckler (8 January 1949 – 15 January 2007) was Head of Supervision at the Securities & Investment Board (1994–95), Chief Executive of the Securities & Investment Board (1996–97) and Chief Executive of the Financial Services Authority (1997–98).

== Career ==
Winckler was born in Bedfordshire on 8 January 1949, the son of Aubrey Norman Toussaint Winckler and Pamela Elizabeth Essie (née Webb). He was educated at Bedford Modern School and Christ's College, Cambridge.

Winckler began his career at HM Treasury (1970–82). In 1978 he was seconded to HM Diplomatic Service as First Secretary to the British Embassy, Washington (1978–81). After HM Treasury Winckler became an executive at Lloyds Bank (1982–87) finishing his time there as a director of its Merchant Banking division. He then became a Director of Security Pacific Hoare Govett (1987–90) and Deputy Chairman of European Capital Company (1990–94).

In 1994 Winckler was appointed Head of Supervision at the Securities & Investment Board (1994–95), Chief Executive of the Securities & Investment Board (1996–97) and Chief Executive of the Financial Services Authority (1997–98).

After the Financial Services Authority, Winckler became Chairman of the UK Financial Services Regulatory Practice of Ernst & Young (1998-2006). He further took up several board appointments including the Housing Corporation (1998-2005), Euroclear (2003-06) and the Jersey Financial Services Commission (1998-2006). He served as a trustee of the Kennedy Memorial Trust (1998-2003).

== Honours ==
In recognition of Winckler’s contribution to financial services in the United Kingdom, Euroclear sponsors an annual award of the Chartered Institute for Securities & Investment in his memory.

== Family life ==
In 1971 Winckler married Marie Estelle Sigwart. They had three sons. Winckler died in London on 15 January 2007.

== Publications ==
- A Practitioner’s Guide to the FSA Handbook, by Andrew Winckler. Published by City and Financial Publishing, 2001
