= Catherine Sampson =

British writer of crime/thriller fiction

Catherine Sampson or Cate Sampson is a British writer of crime/thriller fiction. Her first four novels were published by Pan Macmillan, using the name Catherine Sampson. Her most recent books have been published using the name Cate Sampson. She is a teacher in London who has also worked as a foreign correspondent for The Times and other publications.

== Biography ==
Sampson was born in 1962 in Swindon, England. She studied Chinese at Leeds University where she graduated with a BA in 1984. She then studied at Harvard University as a Kennedy Scholar. After working for the BBC in London she was assigned by The Times to Beijing in 1988. As the newspaper's China correspondent, Sampson covered the Tiananmen Square protests of 1989. She also worked as a freelance journalist during the handover of Hong Kong to China in 1997 before beginning her literary career in London. In 2001 she moved back to Beijing, remaining there until 2014 when she returned to London. Sampson's first novel, Falling Off Air, was published in 2004. She is married to James Miles, a senior writer on Chinese affairs at The Economist.

== Work ==
The heroine of Sampson's early books was Robin Ballantyne, a British TV journalist working for "the Corporation" (possibly a veiled reference to the BBC, for which Sampson herself had once worked, and which was also her husband's employer during the 1980s and 90s). In Falling Off Air (2004), Ballantyne witnesses the death of a celebrity neighbour and gradually discovers how it mysteriously relates to her own professional and private world. In Out of Mind (2005), Ballantyne goes in search of a missing camerawoman, and becomes embroiled in "Corporation" intrigues. Ballantyne is less central to the action in Sampson's third novel, The Pool of Unease (2007), in which she shares the main role with Song Ren, a private detective. Both are trying to unravel the murder of a British man in Beijing. In the fourth novel, The Slaughter Pavilion (2008), Ballantyne is mentioned only briefly and Song becomes the protagonist. His investigations explore the gritty and lawless world of rural China.

== Bibliography ==
- Falling Off Air (2004) ISBN 0-446-69523-8
- Out of Mind (2005) ISBN 1-4050-4081-5
- The Pool of Unease (2007) ISBN 0-330-44821-8
- The Slaughter Pavilion (2008) ISBN 0-330-44822-6
- Takeaway (short story, 2013)
- Carnaby (2013) ISBN 978-1471115813
- Splintered Light (2014) ISBN 978-1471115837

=== Other fiction ===
Hit and Run in Beijing: Portrait of a City (2008) ISBN 962-217-803-0
