= John Clarke (provost) =

Anglican clergyman (1732–1781)

Reverend Dr John Clarke
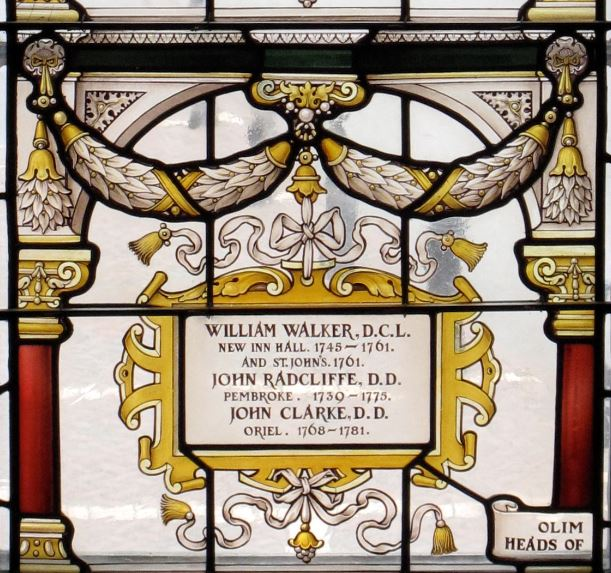
- Stained glass by C. E. Kempe in the Grundy Library, Abingdon School, containing the name of John Clarke
- Born: 1732
- Died: 21 November 1781

John Clarke (1732–1781) was the Provost of Oriel College, Oxford, and an Anglican clergyman.

== Education ==
Born in 1732 he was educated at John Roysse's Free School in Abingdon (now Abingdon School) 1742–1749.

He was a B.D. and Doctor of Divinity 19 May 1768.

== Career ==
John Clarke was Provost of Oriel from 12 February 1768 until his death on 21 November 1781.

He was rector of Kingsdown near Wrotham from 1776 to 1781 and a Prebendary of Rochester.

== See also ==
- List of Old Abingdonians
- List of people associated with Oriel College, Oxford
- List of provosts of Oriel College, Oxford
