= Morris Review =

The Morris Review was a government-sponsored independent review of the UK actuarial profession led by Sir Derek Morris in 2004–05. It was commissioned in March 2004, in the aftermath of the near collapse of Equitable Life, and the subsequent findings of Lord Penrose's Equitable Life Inquiry The review found a number of problems with the actuarial profession, including insularity of approach, lack of transparency, failure to take account of developments in financial economics, and the influence of 'entrenched commercial interests'.

The recommendations steered a course between continued self-regulation by the Institute of Actuaries, and full statutory regulation, concluding that the Financial Reporting Council should assume responsibility for oversight of the actuarial profession and the independent setting of actuarial technical standards. This took place with effect from May 2006.
