= Historic England =

Public body to protect the historical environment of England

- Formation: 1 April 2015
- Legal status: Non-departmental public body
- Headquarters: The Engine House, Fire Fly Avenue, Swindon, SN2 2EH
- Chairman: Neil Mendoza
- Co Chief Executives: Claudia Kenyatta and Emma Squire
- Employees: 964 FTE
- Website: historicengland.org.uk

Historic England (officially the Historic Buildings and Monuments Commission for England) is an executive non-departmental public body of the British Government sponsored by the Department for Culture, Media and Sport. It is tasked with protecting the historic environment of England by preserving and listing historic buildings, scheduling ancient monuments, registering historic parks and gardens, advising central and local government, and promoting the public's enjoyment of, and advancing their knowledge of, ancient monuments and historic buildings.

== History ==
The body was created by the National Heritage Act 1983, and operated from April 1984 to April 2015 under the name of English Heritage. In 2015, following the changes to English Heritage's structure that moved the protection of the National Heritage Collection into the voluntary sector in the English Heritage Trust, the body that remained was rebranded as Historic England.

The body also inherited the Historic England Archive from the former English Heritage, and projects linked to the archive such as Britain from Above, which saw the archive work with the Royal Commission on the Ancient and Historical Monuments of Wales and the Royal Commission on the Ancient and Historical Monuments of Scotland to digitise, catalogue and put online 96,000 of the oldest Aerofilms images. The archive also houses various national collections, including the results of older projects, such as the Royal Commission on the Historical Monuments of England and Images of England (providing online access to images of listed buildings in England as of 2002).

In February 2025, Historic England acquired the Janette Rosing Collection of historic photographs describing it as of "great national significance".

== Remit ==
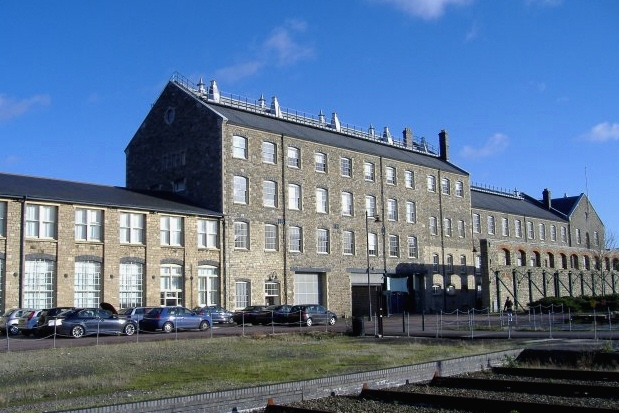
Historic England's Swindon office, home to its archives

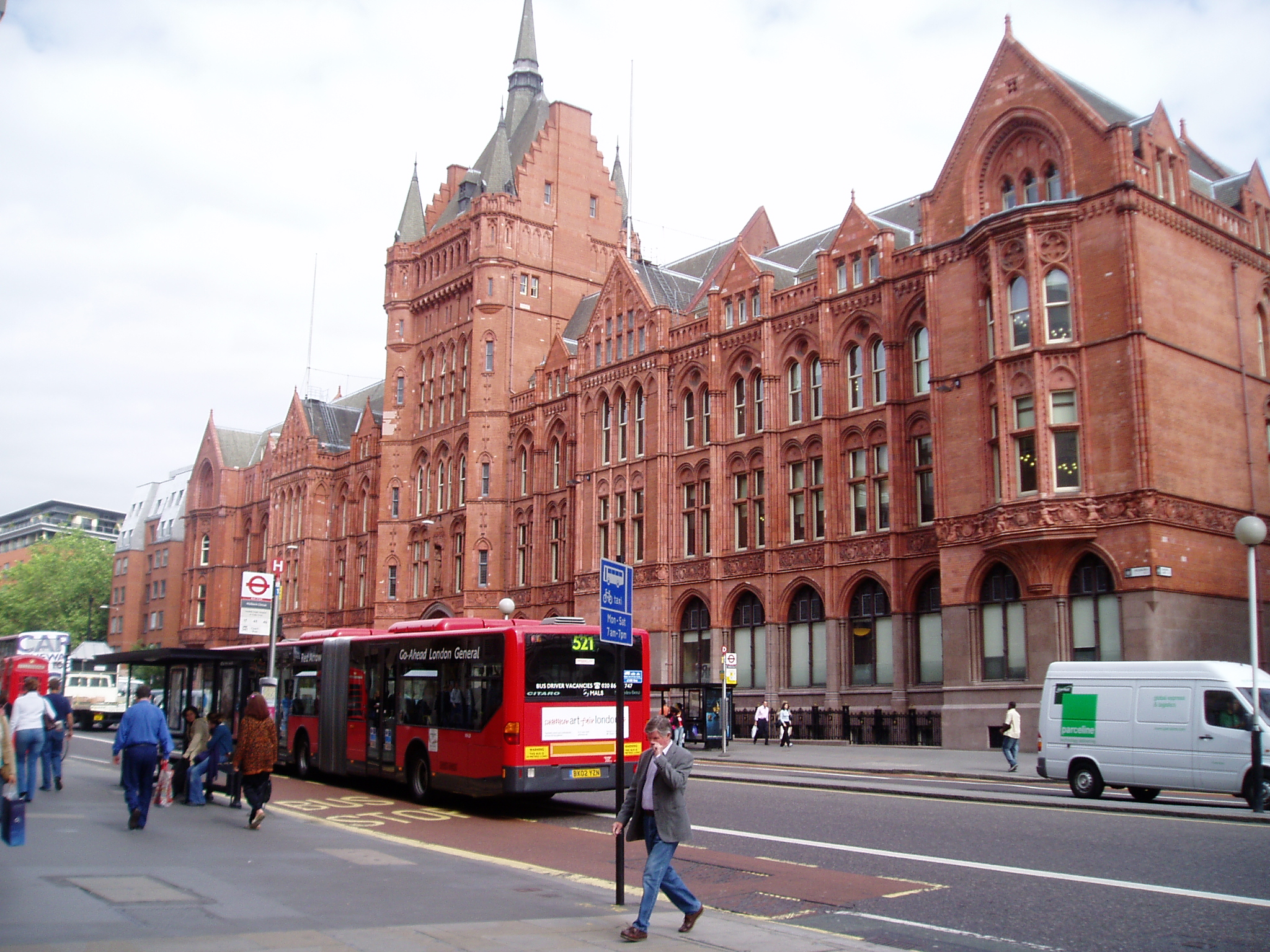
Historic England's former London office at Holborn Bars

Historic England inherited English Heritage's position as the UK government's statutory adviser and a statutory consultee on all aspects of the historic environment and its heritage assets. This includes archaeology on land and underwater, historic buildings sites and areas, designated landscapes and the historic elements of the wider landscape. It monitors and reports on the state of England's heritage and publishes the annual Heritage at Risk survey which is one of the UK government's official statistics. It is tasked to secure the preservation and enhancement of the human-made heritage of England for the benefit of future generations.

Its remit involves:

- Caring for nationally important archive collections of photographs, drawings and other records which document the historic environment of England and date from the eighteenth century onwards.
- Giving grants to national and local organisations for the conservation of historic buildings, monuments and landscapes. In 2013/14 over £13 million worth of grants were made to support heritage buildings.
- Advising central UK government on which English heritage assets are nationally important and should be protected by designation (i.e. listing, scheduling, etc.).
- Administering and maintaining the National Heritage List for England, which is a register of England's:
  - listed buildings,
  - protected wrecks,
  - registered battlefields,
  - registered parks and gardens,
  - scheduled monuments and
  - World Heritage Sites.
- Advising local authorities on managing changes to the most important parts of heritage.
- Providing expertise through advice, training and guidance to improve the standards and skills of people working in heritage, practical conservation and access to resources. In 2009–2010 it trained around 200 professionals working in local authorities and the wider sector.
- Consulting and collaborating with other heritage bodies, local and national planning organisations e.g. the preparation of the 2010 Planning Policy Statement for the Historic Environment (PPS5).
- Commissioning and conducting archaeological research, including the publication of Heritage Counts and Heritage at Risk on behalf of the heritage sector; these are annual research surveys into the state of England's heritage.

It is not responsible for approving alterations to listed buildings. The management of listed buildings is the responsibility of local planning authorities and the Ministry of Housing, Communities and Local Government.

Historic England also owns the National Heritage Collection of nationally important historic sites, currently in public care. It does not run these sites as this function is instead carried out by the English Heritage Trust under licence until 2025.

== Management structure ==
The Secretary of State at the Department for Culture, Media and Sport appoints members of the Commission, which is the governing board of the Historic Buildings and Monuments Commission for England and oversees the work of Historic England. Since September 2023, the chair of the Commission is Lord Mendoza.

The body is run by an executive team, led since November 2025 by co-chief executives Claudia Kenyatta and Emma Squire, who succeeded Duncan Wilson following his retirement.

== See also ==
- Conservation in the United Kingdom
- Heritage Open Days – Annual celebration of England's architecture
- Cadw – Welsh Government historic environment service
- Royal Commission on the Ancient and Historical Monuments of Wales – Archival institution in Wales
- Historic Environment Scotland – Scottish government agency
- Manx National Heritage – National heritage organisation of the Isle of Man
- National Trust – Conservation organisation in England, Wales and Northern Ireland
- National Trust for Scotland – Scottish conservation charity
- Natural England – UK non-departmental public body
- Department for Communities – Northern Irish government department
- Lists
  - Index of conservation articles
  - List of heritage registers
  - List of country houses in the United Kingdom
  - List of museums in England
