= Alfred Evans (cricketer, born 1858) =

English cricketer and educator

Personal information
- Full name: Alfred Henry Evans
- Born: 14 June 1858; Madras, Madras Presidency, British India
- Died: 26 March 1934 (aged 75); Saunton, Devon, England
- Batting: Right-handed
- Bowling: Right-arm fast-medium
- Relatives: John Evans (son); Ralph Evans (son); Dudley Evans (nephew); William Evans (nephew); Alfred Evans (nephew)

Domestic team information
- Years: Team
- 1878–1881: Oxford University
- 1882–1884: Somerset
- 1882–1885: MCC
- 1885: Hampshire

Career statistics
| Competition | First-class |
|---|---|
| Matches | 44 |
| Runs scored | 908 |
| Batting average | 13.75 |
| 100s/50s | 0/3 |
| Top score | 59* |
| Balls bowled | 7,215 |
| Wickets | 204 |
| Bowling average | 16.08 |
| 5 wickets in innings | 20 |
| 10 wickets in match | 6 |
| Best bowling | 9/59 |
| Catches/stumpings | 45/– |
- Source: Cricinfo, 14 February 2010

Alfred Henry Evans (14 June 1858 – 26 March 1934) was an English first-class cricketer and educator. Considered one of the best fast bowlers in England at the time, Evans played in 44 first-class matches between 1878 and 1885, taking over 200 wickets. He would later became a schoolmaster at Winchester College and would found Horris Hill School in 1882, where he was headmaster until 1920.

== Early life and sport at Oxford University ==
The third son of Deputy-Surgeon-General William Evans, formerly Inspector-General of Hospitals in Madras, where he was born in June 1858. He was educated in England, firstly at Rossall School, before moving to Clifton College in 1874, where he represented the college cricket team from 1875 to 1877.

From there, he matriculated to Oriel College, Oxford. While at Oxford, Evans was a member of the Oxford University Cricket Club. It was for the club that he made his debut in first-class cricket against the Gentlemen of England at Oxford in 1878. He played first-class cricket for Oxford until 1881, making eighteen appearances. For the cricket club as a right-arm fast-medium bowler who was described while playing for Oxford as "sometimes almost unplayable", he took 107 wickets at a bowling average of 15.21; he took a five wicket haul on thirteen occasions and took ten wickets in a match on four. As a batsman, he scored 348 runs at an average of 11.22, with a highest score of 49. For Oxford, he gained his blue by appearing in four University Matches against Cambridge University, taking 36 wickets across these matches. His best figures of 7 for 74 came in the 1881 University Match. It was in 1881 that Evans was elected captain of the cricket club; during his captaincy year, he was credited with Oxford's victory over Cambridge, having taken 13 wickets for 130 runs in The University Match.

While studying at Oxford, Evans was also associated with a number of other first-class cricket teams. He played for the Gentlemen in the Gentlemen v Players fixture on six occasions, once for the Gentlemen of England against the touring Australians in 1878, once for I Zingari against Yorkshire in 1879. In the same year for he also played for both the Gentlemen of the South against the Gentlemen of the North, and an England XI against Richard Daft's personal team before it embarked on a tour of North America, whilst in 1881 he played for the Under 30s in the Over 30s v Under 30s fixture at Lord's. It was for the England XI that he was to take his career-best innings figures of 9 for 59.

He also played rugby union at Oxford for Oxford University RFC, captaining the fifteen in the 1879–80 season. However, he resigned at Christmas following the postponement of a match against Cambridge due to frost. Playing as a half-back, he earned his rugby blue in 1877 and 1878 by playing in The Rugby Varsity Match.

== Later cricket and teaching career ==
After graduating from Oxford, he was appointed an assistant master at Winchester College. In the summer break of 1882, Evans played for the MCC against the touring Australians and began playing county cricket for Somerset, having qualified to play for Somerset through his childhood residence at Bath. Two first-class appearances for Somerset in 1882 were followed by two matches for I Zingari against Yorkshire and the Australians. He played for Somerset until 1884, making six first-class appearances for the county. In his six matches for Somerset, he scored 212 runs and made his highest first-class score of 59 not out and took 26 wickets at a bowling average of exactly 22; he took two five wicket hauls, with best figures of 6 for 75.

With his teaching career at Winchester, Evans qualified to play for Hampshire through residency by 1885. He made three first-class appearances for Hampshire in 1885, taking 10 wickets. Later in the same season, he played in his final three first-class matches, all during the Scarborough Festival. These came for I Zingari, the Gentlemen, and the MCC. Described as one of the best fast bowlers of his time by Wisden, he took 204 wickets from 44 first-class matches at an average of 16.08, with 25 five wicket hauls and six ten-wicket hauls in a match.

Evans left Winchester in April 1888 and founded Horris Hill School at Newbury, where he was headmaster until 1920. He quickly established the school as a beacon of academic and sporting excellence, with the future England captain Douglas Jardine being amongst the school's alumni. He died suddenly in March 1934 at Saunton, Devon, having been taken ill while playing golf. He was married to Isabel Aimée du Boulay, daughter of the Winchester master J. T. Houssemayne Du Boulay. Their two sons, John and Ralph, both played first-class cricket; John would play Test cricket for England in 1921. His nephews, Dudley, William, and Alfred, also played first-class cricket.
