= James Ennis =

James Ennis may refer to:

- James Ennis (cricketer) (1900–1976), Irish cricketer
- James Ennis III (born 1990), American basketball player
- Jim Ennis (born 1967), Canadian ice hockey player

== See also ==
- James Innes (disambiguation)
- James Ehnes
