= Kennedy Scholarship =

British university scholarship

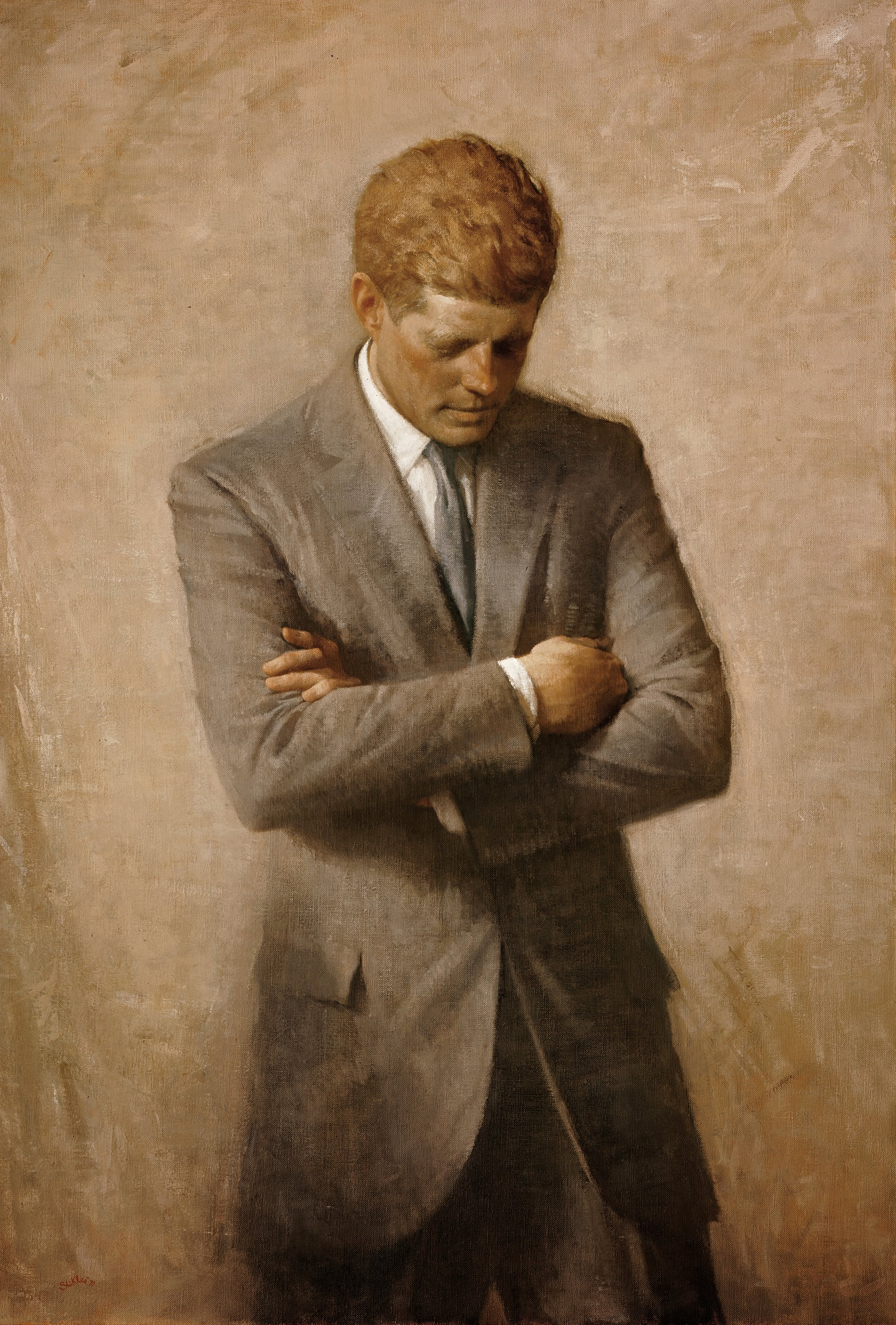
White House portrait of President John F. Kennedy by Aaron Shikler.

Kennedy Scholarships provide full funding for up to ten British post-graduate students to study at either Harvard University or the Massachusetts Institute of Technology (MIT). Susan Hockfield, the sixteenth president of MIT, described the scholarship program as a way to "offer exceptional students unique opportunities to broaden their intellectual and personal horizons, in ways that are more important than ever in an era defined by global interaction.". In 2007, 163 applications were received, of which 10 were ultimately selected, for an acceptance rate of 6.1%.

== Creation ==
Following the assassination of President John F. Kennedy in 1963, Sir Alec Douglas-Home, the prime minister of the United Kingdom, set about creating a national British memorial in his memory. He consulted with Harold Wilson (the Leader of HM's Loyal Opposition), Sir David Ormsby-Gore (British Ambassador to the United States), Dean Rusk (United States Secretary of State) and the Kennedy family. It was agreed that Douglas-Home would establish a committee, chaired by Lord Franks (former British Ambassador to the United States of America), to make recommendations on the form of the memorial to President Kennedy.

Following wide consultation, Franks wrote to the Prime Minister to recommend that the memorial should be in two parts: a living memorial, in the form of a scholarship to attend either Harvard or MIT, and a permanent memorial site in Runnymede, England, the site of the Magna Carta. This location was chosen because it was regarded as the birthplace of the freedoms which President Kennedy promised to uphold. The John F. Kennedy Memorial Act 1964 was passed into legislation to enact and manage the two memorials.

== Kennedy family ==
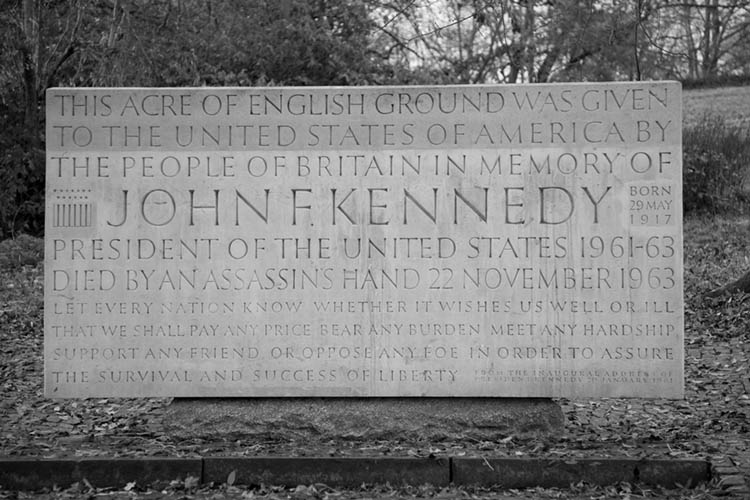
JFK Memorial designed by Geoffrey Jellicoe

The Kennedy family have been strong supporters of the British Kennedy memorial since its creation. Prior to the United States' entry into the Second World War, Joseph P. Kennedy Sr. served as the United States Ambassador to the United Kingdom. In 1965, Jacqueline Kennedy and Elizabeth II of the United Kingdom unveiled the memorial at Runnymede. It consists of a Portland stone memorial tablet within natural woodland and meadow, where the visitor is invited on a journey, resembling that in Pilgrim's Progress; the journey through what is seen is mirrored by a deeper one into the unseen landscape of life, death and spirit. The stone is inscribed with the famous quote from Kennedy's Inaugural Address given on 20 January 1961:

Let every Nation know, whether it wishes us well or ill, that we shall pay any price, bear any burden, meet any hardship, support any friend or oppose any foe, in order to assure the survival and success of liberty.

Senator Edward Kennedy described the program as the most ambitious of all the memorials to his brother, and he was a passionate supporter of the Kennedy Scholarships until his death in August 2009.

== Former trustees ==
Since 1964, all UK Kennedy Memorial Trust trustees have been appointed by the prime minister of the United Kingdom. Various prominent individuals have previously served as trustees. These include:

- Roger Makins, 1st Baron Sherfield GCB GCMG FRS (First Chair)
- David Ormsby-Gore, 5th Baron Harlech KCMG PC (Chair 1964–1985)
- Professor Sir Isaiah Berlin OM FBA (1974–1978)
- Robin Russell, 14th Duke of Bedford (Chair 1985–1990)
- Jonathan Glover (1978-1998)
- Professor Jack Lewis, Baron Lewis of Newnham FRS Hon FRSC (1989–1999)
- Professor Anthony Quinton, Baron Quinton (Chair 1990–1995)
- Mervyn King, Lord King of Lothbury KG – former Kennedy Scholar (1990–2000)
- Professor Peter Hennessy, Baron Hennessy of Nympsfield KG FBA – former Kennedy Scholar (Chair 1995–2000)
- Andrew Stuart Winckler (1998–2003)
- Professor Martin Rees, Baron Rees of Ludlow OM FRS HonFREng FMedSci FRAS HonFInstP (1999–2004)
- Professor Emma Rothschild CMG – former Kennedy Scholar (Chair 2000–2009)
- Professor Sir David Cannadine FBA (2000–2010)
- Professor Roderick MacFarquhar (2000–2010)
- Johnny Grimond (2006–2016)
- Dr Peter Englander OBE – former Kennedy Scholar (2007–2022)
- Professor Tony Badger (Chair 2010–2015)
- Professor Anthony Saich (2010–2020, representing Harvard)
- Dr Martin Weale CBE (2010–2020)
- Professor Maya Jasanoff (2020–2024 representing Harvard)
- Professor Fiona Macpherson – former Kennedy Scholar (2014–2024)
- Stephanie Flanders – former Kennedy Scholar (2014–2024)
- Professor Sir Mark Walport FRS FMedSci (2015–2025, Chair 2017–2025)

== Trustees ==
The current trustees are:

- Sir Richard Moore KCMG (Chair) – former Kennedy Scholar, former chief of the Secret Intelligence Service (MI6)
- United States Ambassador to the United Kingdom – (representing the president of the United States)
- Dr Tariq Baloch KC – former Kennedy Scholar, barrister
- Professor Kirstie Blair – former Kennedy Scholar, Deputy Principal (Academic) at University of Stirling
- Matt Clifford CBE – former Kennedy Scholar, co-founder and CEO of Entrepreneur First
- Tilly Franklin – former Kennedy Scholar, chief investment officer of University of Cambridge Endowment Fund
- Professor Gareth H. McKinley (representing MIT) – former Kennedy Scholar, Professor of Teaching Innovation in the School of Engineering at Massachusetts Institute of Technology
- Professor Rana Mitter (representing Harvard) – former Kennedy Scholar, ST Lee Chair in US-Asia Relations at the Harvard Kennedy School, Harvard University
- Rupert Morley – former Kennedy Scholar, non-executive director of Pershing Square Holdings and Chair of Bremont Watches
- Mary Ann Sieghart – journalist and author (Senior Independent Trustee)
- Moira Wallace OBE – former Kennedy Scholar, former civil servant and provost of Oriel College, University of Oxford

== Patrons ==
- The lord mayor of London
- The governor of the Bank of England

== Selection ==
Nearly 600 individuals have been awarded a Kennedy Scholarship. Selection follows a national competition which begins each autumn. A long-list and short-list are chosen and then around twenty-five individuals are invited to London for interview by the trustees.

When evaluating applications and interviewing candidates, the trustees take into consideration candidates':

- intellectual attainment
- readiness and ability to express themselves
- the suitability of their proposed course of study at Harvard or MIT.

They may also look for: originality of mind, commitment to public service, potential to make a mark in public life and the ability to overcome adversity

The selection aims, criteria and standards are comparable to the Rhodes Scholarship and Marshall Scholarship programs.

== Notable Kennedy scholars ==
Prominent former scholars include:

=== Politics, government and civil service ===
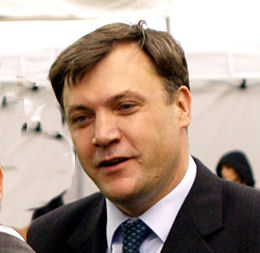
Ed Balls, the Shadow Chancellor of the Exchequer (2011–2015)

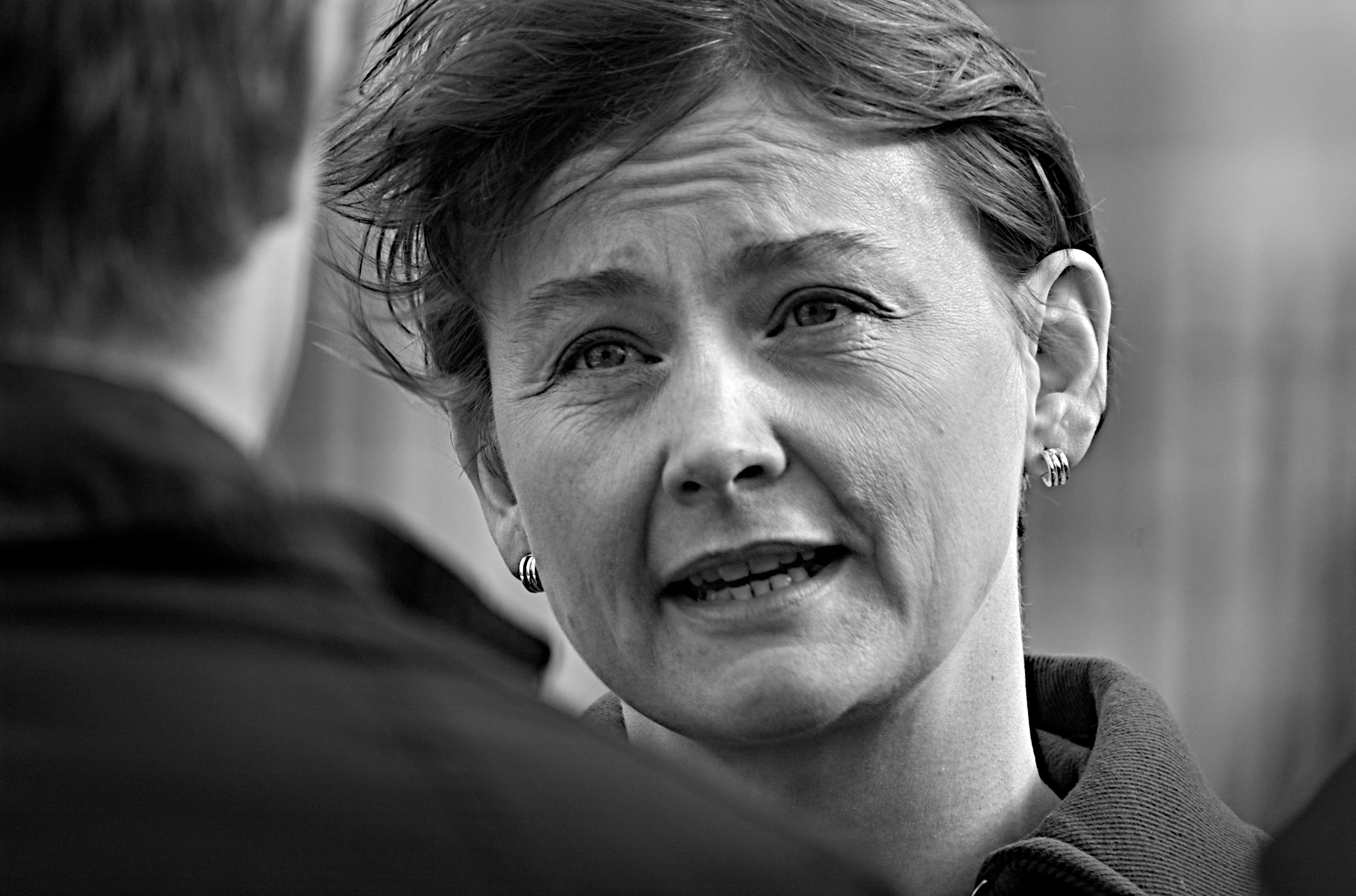
Yvette Cooper, Foreign Secretary (2025–2026). She was the first woman and the second Kennedy Scholar to hold the Cabinet post of Chief Secretary to the Treasury.

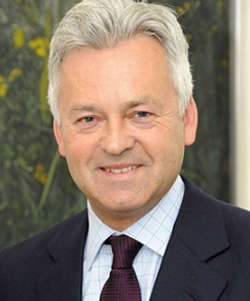
Alan Duncan, Minister for International Development (2010–2015)

- Ed Balls – politician – Shadow Chancellor of the Exchequer (2011–2015), Secretary of State for Children, Schools and Families (2007–2010)
- Dame Kate Bingham – former head of UK Government's COVID-19 Vaccine Task Force
- Nicholas Boles – Parliamentary Under-Secretary of State (2014–2016), Department for Communities and Local Government (2012–2014), Chief of Staff to the London Mayor Boris Johnson (2008), director of the Policy Exchange (2002–2007)
- Camilla Cavendish – former journalist and leader writer, The Times, The Sunday Times; sometime head of Number 10 Policy Unit, now Baroness Cavendish of Little Venice
- Yvette Cooper – politician – Foreign Secretary (2025- ), Home Secretary (2024–2025) Shadow Home Secretary (2011–2015), Secretary of State for Work and Pensions (2009–2010), Chief Secretary to the Treasury (2008–2009)
- David Curry – politician – Shadow Secretary of State for Environment, Food and Rural Affairs (2003–2004), Minister for Local Government, Housing and Urban Regeneration (1994–1997)
- Sir Alan Duncan – politician – Minister of State for Foreign Affairs (2016–2019), Minister of State for Department for International Development (2010–2015), shadow Leader of the House of Commons (2009), shadow Secretary of State for Business, Enterprise and Regulatory Reform (2005–2009),
- Barry Gardiner – politician – Parliamentary Under Secretary of State at the Northern Ireland Office (2004–2005), Department of Trade and Industry (2005–2006) and DEFRA (2006–2007)
- Duncan Hamilton – politician, now advocate – Member of the Scottish Parliament for Highlands and Islands region (1999–2003), youngest member of the Scottish Parliament, special advisor to Alex Salmond, First Minister of Scotland (2007–2008)
- Kwasi Kwarteng – politician – Chancellor of the Exchequer (2022–2022) and Member of Parliament for Spelthorne (2010–2024)
- Gordon Marsden – politician – Parliamentary Private Secretary to Lord Chancellor's Department (2001–2003) and to Secretary of State for Culture, Media and Sport (2003–2005)
- Ian Martin – United Nations special representative of the secretary-general in Nepal, secretary-general of Amnesty International (1986–1992)
- Mahiben Maruthappu – Health policy specialist, former advisor to National Health Service
- David Miliband – politician – president International Rescue Committee (2013–), Secretary of State for Foreign and Commonwealth Affairs (2007–2010)

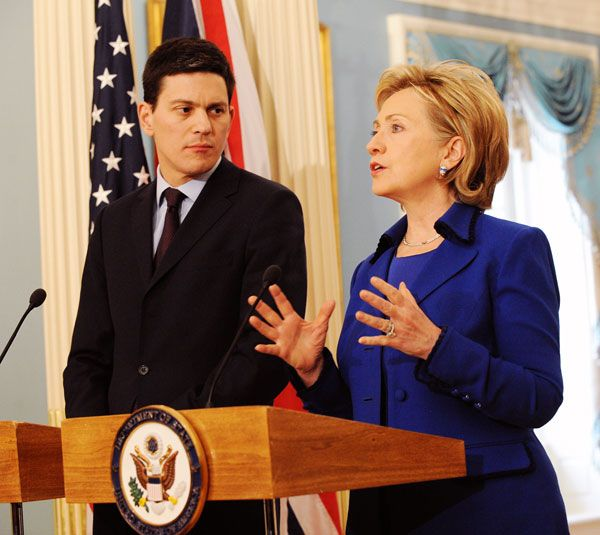
David Miliband, the Secretary of State for Foreign and Commonwealth Affairs (2007–2010), one of four Kennedy Scholars in the Cabinet of Gordon Brown

- Chris Smith, Baron Smith of Finsbury – politician, now Master of Pembroke College, Cambridge – chairman of the Environment Agency (2008–2014), Secretary of State for Culture, Media and Sport (1997–2001)
- Una O'Brien – permanent secretary, Department of Health (2010–2016)
- Richard Tomlinson – former MI6 officer, author of the Big Breach: From Top Secret to Maximum Security
- William Arthur Waldegrave, Baron Waldegrave of North Hill – politician – Secretary of State for Health (1990–1992), Chancellor of the Duchy of Lancaster (1992–1994), Minister of Agriculture, Fisheries and Food (1994–1995), Chief Secretary to the Treasury (1995–1997), former chairman of the Rhodes Scholarship program, Provost of Eton College
- Moira Wallace – Provost Oriel College, University of Oxford (2013–), permanent secretary, Department of Energy and Climate Change (2008–2012)
- Peter Wilson CMG – diplomat – British ambassador to China (2025–)
- Anthony Wayland Wright – politician – chairman of the Public Administration Select Committee (1999–2010)

=== Economics and finance ===
- Ros Altmann – economist, Baroness Altmann CBE, Ministor for Pensions (2015–2016), former member of Number 10 Policy Unit
- Linda Todhunter Bilheimer – economist, assistant director, US Congressional Budget Office
- Lord Eatwell – economist, president of Queens' College, University of Cambridge
- Peter Englander – former director of Apax Partners, and former CEO of the Apax Foundation.
- Sylvia Ann Hewlett – economist, founding president of the Center for Work-Life Policy
- Charlotte Hogg – economist, chief operating officer, Bank of England (2013–)
- Mervyn King, Prof the Lord King of Lothbury KG GCB FBA – former governor of the Bank of England (2003–2013)
- Emma Rothschild – economic historian
- Tim Sims – founder and managing director of Pacific Equity Partners

=== Journalism ===
- Stephanie Flanders – former economics editor, BBC
- Zanny Minton Beddoes – editor-in-chief, The Economist
- Simon Kuper – journalist and author, Financial Times
- Anatole Kaletsky – author and columnist, Reuters chairman, Institute for New Economic Thinking
- Catherine Sampson – journalist and author

=== Arts ===
- Hannah Sullivan – poet

=== Academia ===
- Laura Ashe FRHistS – professor of English literature, University of Oxford
- Andrew Blake FREng, FRS – director of Alan Turing Institute, former principal research scientist at Microsoft Research Cambridge
- Jon Blundy FRS – professor of petrology, Earth Sciences Department, University of Bristol
- Professor Emile Chabal – professor of contemporary history, University of Edinburgh
- Professor John Craven CBE – former vice-chancellor of the University of Portsmouth, founder and first chairman of the University Alliance
- Sally Connolly – associate professor of contemporary poetry, University of Houston
- Gareth Evans – philosopher
- David Edwards FMedSci (neuroscientist) – professor of paediatrics and neonatal medicine and director of the Centre for the Developing Brain, King's College London
- Mark Ford – professor in English, University College London
- Jill Harries – professor emerita of ancient history at the University of St Andrews
- David Held – professor at School of Government and Master, University College, Durham University; co-founder of Polity Press
- Peter Hennessy – historian, Professor the Lord Hennessy of Nympsfield FBA, Attlee Professor of Contemporary British History at Queen Mary, University of London and crossbencher, House of Lords
- Simon Goldhill – classicist, professor of Greek literature and culture at the University of Cambridge and fellow of King's College, Cambridge
- Neil F. Johnson – physicist, professor of physics at the University of Miami, Florida
- Richard K. Lester – Japan Steel Industry Professor of Nuclear Engineering at MIT and associate provost for international activities.
- Dominic Lieven FBA – professor; senior research fellow, Trinity College, Cambridge
- Peter Littlewood FRS – physicist, professor; laboratory director for physical sciences and engineering, Argonne National Laboratory, Illinois
- Rana Mitter – professor of history and politics of modern China, University of Oxford
- Christopher Peacocke FBA – philosopher, professor of philosophy at Columbia University
- Tony Purnell – engineer, head of technology, British Cycling; fellow-commoner in engineering, Trinity Hall, Cambridge
- Simon Schaffer – professor of the history and philosophy of science, University of Cambridge
- Chloë Starr – professor of Asian theology and Christianity, Yale Divinity School
- Tom F. Wright FRHistS – historian – reader in rhetoric at University of Sussex

=== Law ===
- Mary Arden, the Rt Hon. Lady Arden of Heswall DBE – Justice of the Supreme Court of the United Kingdom, chairman of the Law Commission (1996–1999)
- Nicholas Hamblen, The Rt Hon. Lord Hamblen of Kersey – Justice of the Supreme Court of the United Kingdom
- Sir Bernard Rix QC, Arbitrator and former Lord Justice of Appeal

== See also ==
- List of buildings and monuments honoring presidents of the United States in other countries
