= John Evans (cricketer, born 1889) =

English cricketer

Personal information
- Full name: Alfred John Evans
- Born: 1 May 1889; Highclere, Hampshire, England
- Died: 18 September 1960 (aged 71); Marylebone, London, England
- Batting: Right-handed
- Bowling: Right arm medium-fast
- Relatives: Alfred Evans (father); Ralph Evans (brother); Alfred Evans (cousin); Dudley Evans (cousin); William Evans (cousin)

International information
- National side: England
- Only Test (cap 197): 11 June 1921 v Australia

Domestic team information
- Years: Team
- 1908–1920: Hampshire
- 1909–1912: Oxford University
- 1912–1921: Marylebone Cricket Club
- 1921–1928: Kent

Career statistics
Competition	Test	First-class
Matches	1	90
Runs scored	18	3,499
Batting average	9.00	24.64
100s/50s	–/–	6/18
Top score	14	143
Balls bowled	0	6,085
Wickets	–	110
Bowling average	–	27.83
5 wickets in innings	–	4
10 wickets in match	–	1
Best bowling	–	7/50
Catches/stumpings	–/–	94/–
- Source: CricInfo, 21 March 2009

Alfred John Evans MC & Bar (1 May 1889 – 18 September 1960) was an English amateur cricketer, soldier and aviator. As a cricketer, he played first-class cricket before the First World War as an all-rounder for Oxford University and Hampshire, and after the war for Kent County Cricket Club, whom he captained in 1927. Evans gained one Test cap in the 1921 Ashes series against Australia. In first-class cricket, he made 90 appearances, scoring nearly 3,500 runs and taking 110 wickets.

In his military service, Evans partook in both the First and the Second World War's. Beginning in the Intelligence Corps during the First World War, he later joined the Royal Flying Corps as a reconnaissance pilot, which earned him the Military Cross (MC). After crash landing behind enemy lines on the Western Front, Evans became a German prisoner of war. A persistent escape attemptee, he eventually managed to successfully escape to Switzerland and resumed his participation in the war as a bomber pilot in Palestine and the Levant. During a bombing raid, he again crash landed and was taken captive by the Ottoman Turks. After an unsuccessful escape attempt, Evans succeeded for the second time when he bribed an Ottoman doctor to declare him sick and eligible for a prisoner swap. Upon his liberation, he gained a bar to his MC in recognition of his persistent escapes from captivity. During the Second World War, he served in MI9, providing guidelines and advice for the escape of prisoners of war.

Later in life he was a noted fiction and non-fiction writer, and a proponent of the Derbyite theory of Shakespeare authorship.

== Early life and education ==
Evans was born at Highclere in Hampshire in May 1889; his father, Alfred, had been a master at Winchester College and had founded Horris Hill School in 1888. Evans began his education at Horris Hill, before moving on to Winchester. Whilst at Winchester he played for and captained the cricket eleven, and also represented the school at racquets and golf. As cricket captain in his final year, he missed out on playing against Eton College due to being afflicted with mumps. From Winchester, he matriculated to Oriel College, Oxford.

== Cricket ==
=== Hampshire and Oxford University ===
Prior to his matriculation, he made his debut in first-class cricket for Hampshire against Derbyshire at Derby in the 1908 County Championship, with him scoring a half century in Hampshire's second innings. He played a further County Championship matches in that season. During his freshman year, Evans played first-class cricket on nine occasions for Oxford University Cricket Club, which included playing in The University Match against Cambridge University at Lord's, in which he gained a blue. He played once for Hampshire against Worcestershire in the 1909 County Championship following the conclusion of his freshman year. The following season, he made nine appearances for Oxford, in addition to playing for a combined Oxford and Cambridge Universities team against a combined Army and Navy team at Aldershot.

Evans captained Oxford in 1911, making seven appearances that season and heading the Oxford bowling averages with 34 wickets at an average of 17.96; he took figures of 7 for 50 (match figures of 10 for 74) against H. D. G. Leveson Gower's personal eleven at Eastbourne and 5 for 32 against the touring Indians at Oxford. He also played one match each for Hampshire in the 1911 County Championship and for the combined Oxford and Cambridge Universities team in a repeat of the previous seasons fixture against the Army and Navy team. He was replaced as Oxford captain during his final year in 1912 by Richard Twining, with Evans making a further five appearances for the university, and having considerable success. He scored his maiden first-class century (107) for Oxford against the touring South Africans, having made 56 runs in Oxford's first innings. In thirty first-class matches for Oxford, he scored 1,173 runs at an average of 22.55, while with the ball he took 76 wickets at an average of 21.82, taking four five wicket hauls. Evans gained additional blues in racquets and golf.

His success during the first half of the 1912 season with Oxford led to his selection for the Gentlemen in the Gentlemen v Players fixtures at Lord's and The Oval. Having played for Hampshire against Kent, he proceeded to play against the touring Australians and South Africans for an England XI and Lionel Robinson's personal eleven respectively. Evans also played for the Marylebone Cricket Club (MCC) against Yorkshire at the Scarborough Festival. Having graduated with a Second Class degree in history, he was offered a teaching position at Eton College on the condition that he first spend a year in Germany. There, he became fluent in German during his year in the country, but only taught at Eton for one year before leaving to begin a business career in industry with Edward Lloyd & Co. Though he did not feature in first-class cricket in 1913, Evans made two appearances in 1914, for the MCC against Oxford University and for the Free Foresters against Cambridge University. Following the First World War, he only occasionally played, making two appearances for in 1919 for the Gentlemen of England against the Australian Imperial Forces and for the Gentlemen in the Gentlemen v Players fixture, while the following season he played once for Hampshire against Kent in the 1920 County Championship.

=== Kent and Test cricket ===
Playing for the MCC against the touring Australians in May 1921, Evans made an unbeaten 69. He followed this up merely days later with a century (102) on debut for Kent against Northamptonshire. It was on the strength of these performances that he was picked for the England team for the second Ashes Test at Lord's in June. Batting twice in the match, he was dismissed for 4 runs in England's first innings by Ted McDonald, while in their second innings he was dismissed for 14 runs by the same bowler. Wisden remarked that the occasion of Test was "perhaps rather too big for him", whilst other reports suggested that he was "so nervous that his knees were knocking together... his nerve had gone and the first straight ball did for him". This was to be Evans' only Test cap.

After playing for England, he appeared once more that season for Kent in the County Championship, before making three appearances in the 1922 County Championship. His appearances were limited by his business commitments, which resulted in him appearing just once in 1923 against Essex. He played first-class cricket for the Harlequins in 1924 against the touring South Africans, and for the Free Foresters against Oxford University in 1925. After a two-year hiatus in which he did not play for Kent, Evans was appointed Kent captain ahead of the 1927 season, succeeding the retiring Wykeham Cornwallis. In what was to be his only full season of county cricket, Evans made 23 appearances and gained his cap, scoring 832 runs at an average of 25.21, whilst making three centuries; his 143 against Lancashire at Maidstone was his highest career score. Despite having led Kent a respectable fourth-place in the County Championship, he resigned the captaincy at the end of the season and was succeeded by Geoffrey Legge. Despite resigning the captaincy, he continued to play for Kent in 1928, making eight appearances in the County Championship. From 1921 to 1928, Evans played for Kent in 36 first-class matches. In these, he scored 1,303 runs at an average of 25.05, in addition to taking 19 wickets at an average of 31.84. He made his final first-class appearance in August 1928, for the Harlequins against the touring West Indians.

Described by The Times as "a stylish hard-driving batsman" and by The Cricketer magazine as "a player of a classically orthodox style", he scored 3,499 runs at an average of 24.64 from ninety first-class matches, scoring six centuries and eighteen half centuries. As a bowler, he was described by Carlaw in Kent County Cricketers A to Z as "a more than useful fast-medium inswing bowler", with Evans taking 110 wickets at an average of 27.83 across his first-class career. He predominantly fielded in the slips, taking 94 catches.

== Military service ==
=== First World War ===
==== First capture and escape ====
At the outbreak of the First World War Evans was approached to join the newly founded Intelligence Corps, having been identified as a good candidate as a result of his year spent in Germany after graduating from Oxford. He initially joined the mounted section of the Corps, but was injured in a motorcycle accident in France in September 1914, returning to England after to recuperate. In February 1915 he was attached to No. 3 Squadron, Royal Flying Corps an observer. The squadron was the first to use aerial photography to record details of enemy positions with observers, such as Evans, taking images at low altitudes, often whilst under fire. In September 1915 he was awarded the Military Cross for continuing to observe whilst his aircraft was under attack from an enemy plane and was also Mentioned in Dispatches. In early 1916 he became a pilot and was active spotting German artillery positions during the Battle of the Somme flying a Morane Parasol. He and his observer, Lieutenant Long, were tasked with a series of continuous reconnaissance flights during July. On 16 July, their aircraft malfunctioned with the pair being forced to crash-land behind enemy lines. After a heavy landing, in which Evans found himself upside down in the wreckage, he and Long proceeded to burn the wreckage so that it would not fall into German hands in one piece. They were subsequently were captured by German forces.

After being transported to Germany, was made a prisoner of war (POW), initially at Gütersloh, before being moved to Clausthal three weeks later along with other captured airmen. One night, after disguising himself as a civilian, he escaped by cutting his way through the wire fence with wire cutters he had stolen from a German electrician. He made it to within 20 yards (18 m) of the Dutch border, but was spotted by a German sentry and recaptured following a foot pursuit. Following his recapture he spent two weeks in solitary confinement, he was sent to Ingolstadt in Bavaria, where other officers who had made unsuccessful escapes were interned. Evans noted that camp was akin to an "escaping club", housing individuals who were adept at drawing up and putting in action escape plans. He made a series of escape attempts, in which he was recaptured each time; these included an unsuccessful dash across the frozen moat of the fort in which he was imprisoned, a similar attempt in which he and several other prisoners managed to escape into the surrounding countryside under the cover of darkness, but were recaptured by daylight, and a tunnelling attempt, which was only discovered when a thaw caused a subsidence in the earth. He was eventually included amongst a number of POWs to be transferred by train to Zorndorf, which had a reputation for being "an intolerable place". Amongst the other POWs who accompanied him was Captain S. E. Buckley MC, who had knowledge of Zorndorf, having been held prisoner there earlier in the war. The pair combined forces and escaped, by jumping out of the train window. They donned disguises to make them blend in with the local population, and then spent the next 18 nights walking toward the Swiss frontier, arriving near Lake Constance. There, at 12:30am on 9 June 1917, the pair crawled across a stream, evaded a German sentry, and clambered up the opposite bank into Switzerland.

==== Return to duty and second capture ====
Evans was repatriated and returned to duty. Whilst imprisoned, he had received a commission as a temporary second lieutenant in the RFC in March 1917, having previously been an acting corporal. During his imprisonment, the tactics and technology of aerial combat had significantly advanced, necessitating Evans to learn to fly again and to acquaint himself with the latest tactics of the day. Rules prevented POWs returning to active service in the same theatre of war they had been captured in, so Evans was transferred to Egypt and then to Palestine where he took command, in January 1918, of 142 Squadron, a bomber squadron. Evans had mixed feelings about his appointment, as he was pleased with the command, but did not like bombing as he knew little about it. The following month, he was made a squadron commander and given the temporary rank of major.

On 19 March 1918, Evans was tasked with bombing El Kutrani railway station on the Hejaz railway, a long-range mission that he had forced himself to take part in whilst suffering from bad nerves from his experiences as a captive in Germany. After attacking the station he encountered engine trouble on the return flight, near the ancient city of Al-Karak. He was forced to crash-land in a field, with his plane becoming stuck in a ditch. He was joined shortly after by the two-man Australian crew of an accompanying Bristol, who landed to render assistance. Having given up recovering Evans plane, the trio were setting about sabotaging it when they were ambushed by 30–40 Arab tribesmen. They surrendered to the Arabs without a shot being fired, hopeful they could lead them back to friendly lines. However, the Arabs handed them over to the Ottoman Turks, who presented them to the commandant and military governor of Al-Karak. Fearing his name would be known to the Ottomans following his earlier escape from the Germans, he took on the pseudonym "Everard".

Upon being transferred to Amman, Evans learnt that he was to be sent to the German Luftstreitkräfte airfield at El Afule, which would bring him to within 40 miles (64 km) of friendly lines during part of the journey. Escaping alone, he spent a week barefoot wandering the desert near the Dead Sea. After nearly 60 hours without food and drenched from heavy rainfall, he sought shelter and sustenance in a Jewish household, agreeing with that they could hand him over to the Ottomans the next morning if they allowed him to stay. The next morning he was detained by the Ottomans, with Evans being transported to Constantinople and then onto a POW camp, where he spent the next seven months. With conventional escape proving difficult, Evans instead decided to bribe a doctor to have himself declared sick in order to be included in an exchange of officers between Turkish and British troops. He sailed to Alexandria in November 1918, shortly before the armistice. Evans later wrote about his time as a POW in The Escaping Club, which became a bestseller. Following the war, he was transferred to the unemployed list in February 1919, and in December of the same year he was awarded a bar to his MC for his many escape attempts.

=== Second World War ===
During the Second World War, Evans was called into service in MI9, the branch of the War Office responsible for coordinating resistance activities and assisting airmen shot down behind enemy lines and escaping POWs. He helped develop guidelines for the escape of POWs, drawing on his experiences during the First World War. Amongst the guidelines he helped to develop were those on interrogation techniques and methods of avoiding disclosure of information. He landed in Normandy attached to the headquarters of the 21st Army Group in July 1944, helping to secure POWs and evaders as Allied armies advanced across North West Europe. Having been commissioned into the Royal Air Force Volunteer Reserve in January 1940 as a pilot officer, he ended the war as a wing commander and was awarded the American Bronze Star Medal. Following the end of the war, he was involved with a group attempting to recover airmen who had been shot down during the war over what was now East Germany. He wrote the book Escape & Liberation 1939-1945 (1946), which was based on his experiences during the Second World War.

== Later life ==
In later life, Evans wrote a series of novels and crime fictions, whilst also writing on economics. He was a proponent of the Derbyite theory of Shakespeare authorship, writing the book Shakespeare’s Magic Circle which developed the theory. Evans was married in 1919 to Marie Galbraith, an Irish concert violinist. Their son was the actor Michael Evans. Evans died in Marylebone in September 1960, aged 71. His younger brother, Ralph, and a number of cousins, were also first-class cricketers.

== See also ==
- One-Test wonder

== Works cited ==
- Lewis, Paul (2014). For Kent and Country. Brighton: Reveille Press. ISBN 9781908336637.
- "Obituaries". The Cricketer (Winter ed.). London. 1960.
- Carlaw, Derek (2024) [2004]. Kent County Cricketers A to Z. Part Two: 1919–1939 (PDF). Cardiff: ACS.
- Evans, A. J. (1968) [1929]. The Escaping Club. Bath: Cedric Chivers Ltd. – via Internet Archive.

Sporting positions
Preceded by Stanley Cornwallis	Kent County Cricket Club captain 1927	Succeeded by Geoffrey Legge
