= Over 30s v Under 30s =

The Over 30s v Under 30s was a cricket fixture played sporadically between 1851 and 1949. The teams were, as the name of the fixture suggests, made up of players over thirty years of age and under thirty years of age. The first match was held in 1851 at Lord's with the Over 30s winning the match by 7 wickets. The fixture was next held in 1879, with the fixture played in the following three seasons. The fixture was revived in 1901, before the final two matches of the fixture were played in 1937 and 1949. Of the eight fixtures played, the Over 30s won six and the Under 30s won two.

== Bibliography ==
- A Guide to FC Cricket Matches played in the British Isles (second ed.). ACS. 1982.
