= Horris Hill School =

Independent school in Hampshire, England

Location
- Newtown; Near Newbury, Hampshire, RG20 9DJ; England; 51.36449°N 1.33448°W

Information
- Type: Other Independent School
- Founder: Alfred Evans
- Local authority: Hampshire
- Department for Education URN: 116526 Tables
- Headmaster: Helen Wilkinson
- Gender: Girls and Boys
- Age: 4 to 13
- Enrolment: 120
- Houses: The Hill, The Wood, The Bank
- Colours: Blue, red, green, yellow
- Website: horrishill.com

Horris Hill was an independent day and boarding preparatory school for boys aged 4–13. It was in Hampshire in England, south of Newbury in Berkshire and near the village of Newtown. The school was founded on its present site in 1888 by A. H. Evans, a master at Winchester College. It was on an 85-acre estate. In 2016, pupils from overseas made up 15% of the total number of children at the school. The school closed in 2026.

== History ==
The school opened in 1888, and closed in 2026.

== Historic abuse claims (1960s - 90s) ==
In April 2021, the pop singer Will Young talked about his experience at the school, claiming to have suffered from post-traumatic stress disorder. "I've been thinking a lot about prep school, and wondering if any of those institutions will be brought to justice for the things that I saw happen... kids thrown against radiators. Other things I can’t talk about." Young also remembered drunk teachers "rolling around dormitories", one "you wouldn't go for a ride with", and teachers "looking at [students'] penises in the shower". He described feeling a sense of injustice, saying "I think I escaped – not that it didn't damage me."

In October 2022, an appeal was launched for witnesses to alleged abuse by teachers at Horris Hill School in the years spanning the 1960s to the 1990s. This action was taken in support of a group of former pupils who have instructed a solicitors' firm to represent them in their legal claim(s). With regard to the allegations, "some of the [ex-pupils] say they were abused by one teacher while some say they were abused by a number of teachers. The teachers were allegedly able to abuse without any repercussions for decades and former pupils say they used their positions of trust to manipulate the boys and to silence them."

== Historic abuse settlements ==
In August 2024, The Times reported that "[a] charitable foundation that ran a boys' prep school in Berkshire [i.e. Horris Hill] has apologised to seven former pupils and paid compensation after admitting to decades of abuse by two teachers." The teachers were named as Rodney Allan, a former headmaster, and Michael Goldsworthy, a former boarding housemaster. Both were dead at the time of the admission. The Times also reported that Allan had resigned from the headship at Horris Hill in 1985 after a parent complained about his conduct, but was cleared of the charges at the time.

In a letter to one of the claimants, Alex Roe, chair of trustees of the Horris Hill Foundation, "wrote that the foundation offered its "sincere apologies ... for the abuse you suffered at the school and the harm it caused. [...] Schools are meant to be places of safety for children and it is a matter of profound regret to us that this was not the case for you, and that abuse took place within what we considered to be our school. We are so very sorry this happened and for the many years it has taken for this apology." The Times reported Forfar Education, Horris Hill's owners, as saying "[we] have been informed by the former owners, the Horris Hill Trust, that there are no outstanding claims against the former owners of the school and that the seven claimants that did come forward have all been satisfied by the actions of the trust."

== Notable alumni ==
- Richard Adams, author of Watership Down, Shardik and The Girl in a Swing, from 1929
- Ben Britton, materials scientist and engineer
- Sebastian Doggart, film and television producer and director, and writer
- James Innes, author
- Douglas Jardine, former England cricket captain
- Moray Macpherson, cricketer
- Patrick Minford, economist
- Jon Naismith, BBC radio producer
- Maxwell Woosnam, Olympic and Wimbledon doubles champion in lawn tennis, captain of the England national football team
- Will Young, singer and winner of Pop Idol
