= Prisoner of war camps in Switzerland during World War I =

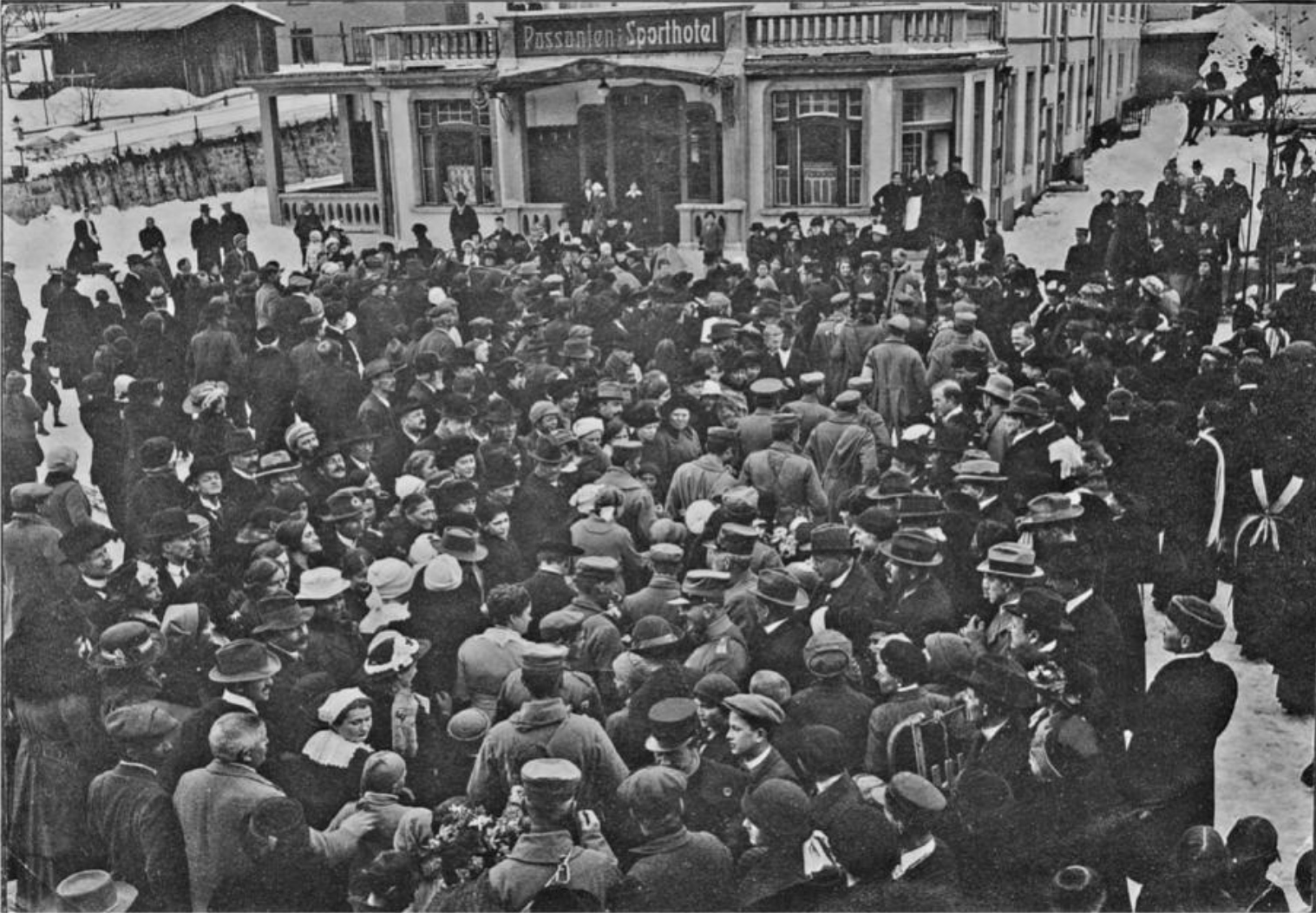
German prisoners of war arriving in Switzerland in 1916

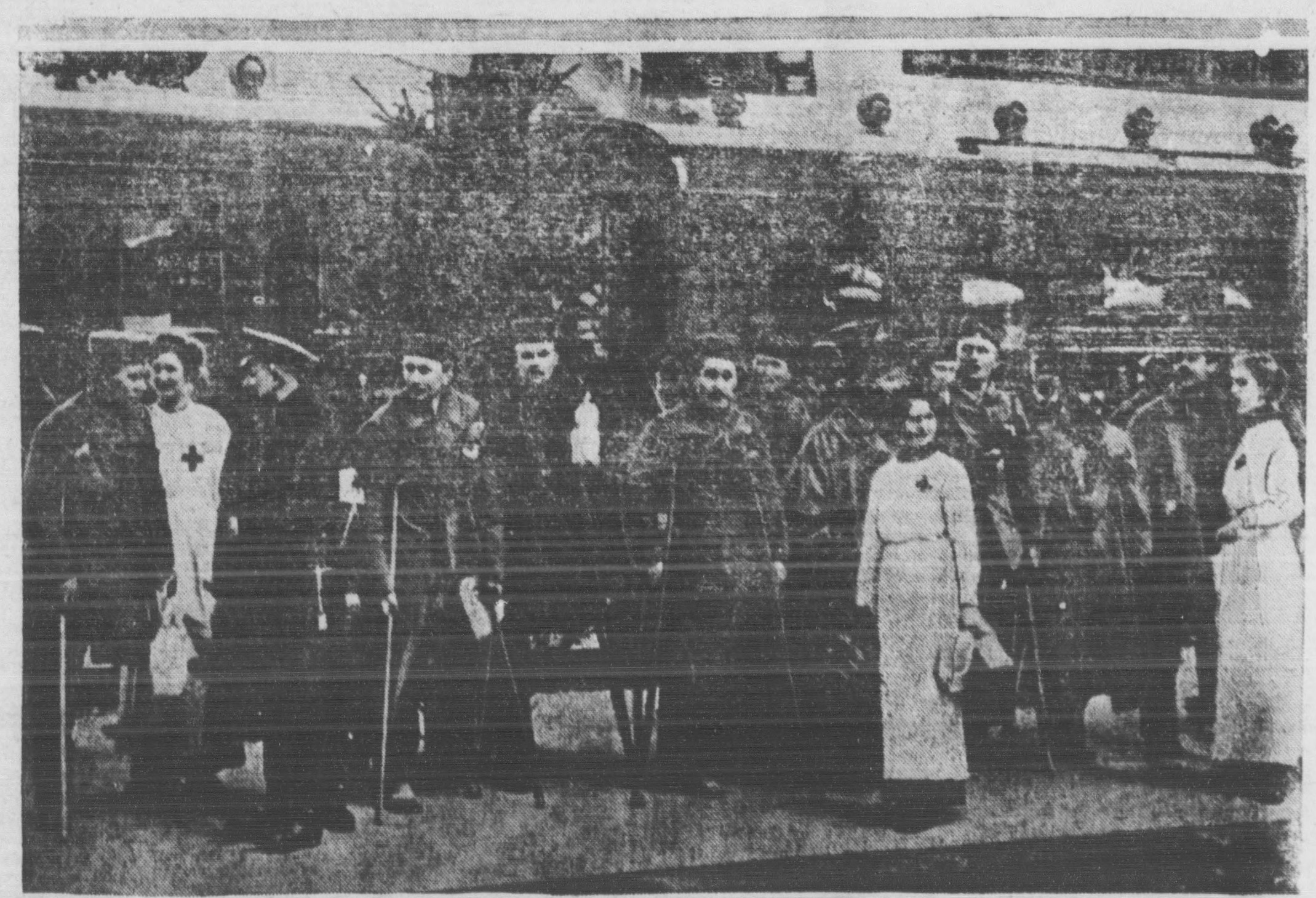
US media published this photo of Exchanged German POWs arriving Home in 1915

During World War I Switzerland accepted 68,000 British, French and German wounded prisoners of war (POW) for recovery in mountain resorts. To be transferred the wounded had to have a disability that would negate their further military service or interned over 18 months and deteriorating mental health. The wounded were transferred from prisoner of war camps unable to cope with the number of wounded and sat out the war in Switzerland. The transfer was agreed between the warring powers and organised by the Red Cross. In all, 219,000 prisoners were exchanged.

== Internment ==
During the war, some prisoners were sent to neutral Switzerland on grounds of ill health. Internment conditions were very strict in Switzerland but softened with time. Only the following illnesses could lead to departure from Germany: diseases of the circulatory system, serious nervous problems, tumours and severe skin diseases, blindness (total or partial), serious face injuries, tuberculosis, one or more missing limbs, paralysis, brain disorders like paraplegia or haemiplegia and serious mental illnesses. From 1917, the criteria were extended to prisoners older than 48 or who had spent over eighteen months in captivity. The Red Cross helped initiate these internments, which it proposed at the end of 1914 and were implemented starting in February 1915. Approval for departure in no way meant permanent freedom but instead transfer to Konstanz, where a medical commission verifying the prisoners' state was located.

Those who managed to pass the controls did not begin the lives of relaxation in Switzerland. By the end of 1916, there were 16,637 French and Belgian prisoners interned, 1,866 British, and 8,487 German and Austrian. These figures remained fairly steady through the rest of the war: on 1 May 1917, for example, there were 13,640 French internees. They were accommodated in hotels, boarding houses and sanatoria. At the beginning, meals were a great improvement on camp offerings: "Morning, 7 o'clock, we had café au lait, jam, and 225 grams of bread for the day. Noon, soupe grasse, beef, potatoes, salad and coffee. Evening, at 6:30, soupe légère, beef tongue in sauce, potatoes, spinach and rhubarb in compote."

The home countries of those interned in Switzerland had to continue to pay for the prisoners' upkeep. France, for example, had to pay four francs per soldier per day, and six for officers (tuberculosis patients cost five and eight francs respectively). The situation rapidly deteriorated, especially with respect to food, which became insufficient. The restrictions, characteristic of those in the camps, were highly resented by the prisoners. French detainees pointed the blame at their own government. Prisoners interned in Switzerland had to perform compulsory labour. Some were released early and managed to rejoin the French Army before the Armistice was signed.

The British entered into an agreement with Germany on 2 May 1916. In order to relieve the pressure on Switzerland, from the middle of 1917 British and German prisoners also began to be interned on similar terms in the Netherlands.

Early in 1918, France and Germany, followed in July by Britain and Germany, reached agreement on the repatriation, subject to conditions, of older soldiers and NCOs (those over 45), those over 40 with at least three children, and those who had been in captivity for at least 18 months. These arrangements did not apply to officers, who were to remain in internment.

== Bibliography ==
Notes

References

- Auriol, Jean-Claude (2002). Les barbelés des bannis.: La tragédie des prisonniers de guerre français en Allemagne pendant la Grande Guerre (in French). Tirésias. ISBN 9782908527940. - Total pages: 284
- Barton, Susan (2019). Internment in Switzerland during the First World War. Bloomsbury Publishing. ISBN 9781350037748. - Total pages: 240
- Foulkes, Imogen (30 May 2016). "Switzerland's forgotten role in saving World War One lives". BBC News.
- Gueugnier, Charles (1998). Les carnets de captivité de Charles Gueugnier, présentés par Nicole Dabernat-Poitevin. Accord edition.
- Wilkinson, Oliver (2017). British Prisoners of War in First World War Germany. Cambridge University Press. ISBN 9781107199422. - Total pages: 308
- Yarnall, John (2011). Barbed Wire Disease: British & German Prisoners of War, 1914-19. History Press. ISBN 9780752456904. - Total pages: 224
