= James Innes (author) =

British author

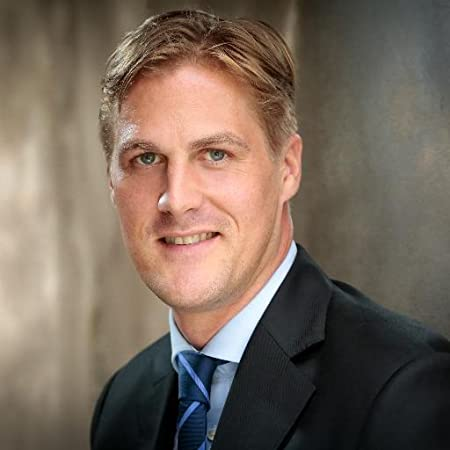
- Born: James Alexander Seymour Innes; 1 September 1975 (age 50)
- Occupations: Author; Career Expert; Presenter
- Title: Founder of James Innes Group.

James Alexander Seymour Innes (born 1 September 1975) is a British entrepreneur, author of several best-selling career help books and founder of the James Innes Group.

== Early life ==
Innes was educated at Ashdown House preparatory boarding school in East Sussex, Horris Hill preparatory school in Berkshire and was subsequently awarded a Foundation Scholarship to Charterhouse, the elite independent boarding school in Godalming, Surrey.

== Career ==
Innes created the first company in the James Innes Group in 1998. He retired from his role as CEO of the James Innes Group in 2014 and currently holds the position of Chairman. He is the author of five best-selling careers books which have been translated into languages including Korean, and Vietnamese.

== Media work ==
Innes has been featured in numerous newspapers over the years including leading titles such as The Independent, The Guardian, The Daily Express, The Mirror, Reveal and TES, as well as various magazines, such as Psychologies.

He has a regular weekly column every Monday in The Daily Star.

In addition to this, he is a regular guest on both TV and radio, including a monthly slot on Share Radio.

James now also hosts his own show on YouTube, the channel covers a range of topics, the most common being that of career advice as well as discussions around the latest news as it relates to employment, careers and the jobs market.

== Published work ==
- The CV Book (Pearson, Harlow, 2009) ISBN 978-1-292-08647-7. Third edition published 2016.
- The Interview Book (Pearson, Harlow, 2009) ISBN 978-1-292-08651-4. Third edition published 2016.
- The Cover Letter Book (Pearson, Harlow, 2009) ISBN 978-1-292-08639-2. Third edition published 2016. First edition originally entitled Brilliant Cover Letters.
- The Interview Question & Answer Book (Pearson, Harlow, 2009) ISBN 978-1-292-08655-2. Second edition published 2016.
- Ultimate New Job (Kogan Page, London, 2012) ISBN 978-0-7494-6409-7.

== Philanthropy ==
A keen philanthropist, James donates 50% of all publishing royalties annually to a wide range of charities, including Durrell Wildlife Conservation Trust UK, The Oxford Radcliffe Hospitals Charitable Funds, Havens Hospices, Down Syndrome Education International and The Charlie Waller Memorial Trust. Previously an organiser and committee member of The Dream Ball, an annual charity event helping young people from difficult backgrounds to fulfil their potential.

== Freemasonry ==
Innes is also actively involved in English Freemasonry, having been initiated into Southwark Lodge No. 879 (London) in 1999, in which he was installed as Master in 2005. Innes is also connected with Freemasonry in both France and Switzerland.
