= Derek Morris (academic) =

British economist

Sir Derek James Morris (born 23 December 1945) is former chairman of the Competition Commission (formerly the Monopolies and Mergers Commission) and was the Provost of Oriel College, Oxford until Moira Wallace replaced him in 2013.

== Education and professional career ==
Morris was educated at Harrow County School for Boys, obtained a first in PPE at St Edmund Hall, Oxford and then took a D.Phil. in Economics at Nuffield College, Oxford before taking up a Research Fellowship at the Centre for Business and Industrial Studies at University of Warwick. From 1970 until 1998 he was Fellow and Tutor in Economics at Oriel. This included three years on secondment as Economic Director of the National Economic Development Council. From 1984 to 1998 he was Chairman of Oxford Economic Forecasting Ltd, and is currently a governor of the National Institute of Economic and Social Research. He joined the Monopolies Commission in 1991, becoming chairman in 1998.

He has published widely on economic topics, most recently on economic reform in Chinese enterprises. In addition, he has acted as adviser to the Asian Development Bank on enterprise reform in Central Asia. He was appointed a Knight Bachelor in the 2003 New Year Honours. In 2004, he was named to head a government-sponsored review into the actuarial profession in the United Kingdom, known as the Morris Review.

From 2007 to 2013 he was a member of the Committee for Standards in Public Life (formerly the Nolan committee); from 2006 to 2016 the chairman of the Trustees of the Oxford University Press Pension Fund; and is now chairman of The Cheviot Trust (a not-for-profit, multi-employer pension scheme); from 2006 to 2013 a non-executive director of Lucida plc (an insurance company which specialises in buying out large scale pension funds) and then its chairman. While at Oriel he was chairman of Oxford University's College Contributions Committee (which recommends redistribution of resources from colleges with high endowment to those with low endowment); and chairman of the Advisory Board for the Centre for Business Taxation at Oxford University. Until 2002 he was also a senior economic advisor to Frontier Economics, and under the auspices of the Cairncross Foundation, lead advisor to the Chinese Government on economic reform.

== Fiction writing ==
His first novel, 'Pawn's Gambit' (under the pseudonym Harry Armstrong) was shortlisted for 'Political Thriller of the Year'. A sequel 'Knight's gambit' was published in 2024.

Academic offices
Preceded by The Rev Ernest Nicholson	Provost of Oriel College, Oxford; 2003–2013	Succeeded by Moira Wallace
