= Moira Wallace =

British civil servant and academic administrator

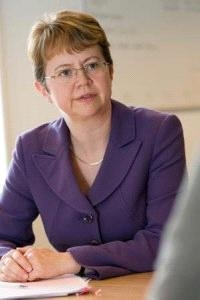

Moira Paul Wallace, OBE (born 15 August 1961) is a former British civil servant and academic administrator. She was Provost of Oriel College, Oxford, from 2013 to 2018. Until October 2012 she was the first Permanent Secretary of the Department of Energy and Climate Change, having moved from her role as Director General of the Crime Reduction and Community Safety Group the Home Office in November 2008.

== Early life and education ==
Wallace was born on 15 August 1961. She studied modern languages at Emmanuel College, Cambridge, graduating in 1983, and studied comparative literature at Harvard University as a Kennedy Scholar, completing her Master of Arts (AM) degree in 1985.

== Career ==
Wallace was appointed Permanent Secretary of the Department of Energy and Climate Change (DECC) on 13 November 2008. Before that, Wallace had spent ten years in HM Treasury, including three years as Private Secretary to Nigel Lawson and John Major when each was Chancellor of the Exchequer. She was Economic Affairs Private Secretary to the Prime Minister from 1995 to 1997. She established and led the Cabinet Office Social Exclusion Unit from 1997 to 2002, and joined the Home Office in 2002. From 2002 to 2005, she ran the Office for Criminal Justice Reform, a joint venture among the three criminal justice departments. From 2005, she was Home Office Director General for Crime and Policing.

She was appointed Officer of the Order of the British Empire (OBE) in the 1997 Prime Minister's Resignation Honours in August 1997.

She announced her resignation from the DECC on 19 July 2012. It was rumoured that her departure was prompted by the conflicting views of various politicians in charge of the DECC, especially over subsidies for renewable energy, and promoting the continued use of gas (most controversially from fracking). She was given a "golden goodbye" of almost £500,000, thought to be the most ever paid to a civil servant to quit early.

On 25 February 2013, it was announced that Wallace would be the first female Provost of Oriel College, University of Oxford; she took up the post in September 2013. In January 2016, there was criticism that there had been a lack of proper leadership over the handling of the Rhodes Must Fall campaign demanding the removal of a statue of Cecil Rhodes. It was reported that donors might withhold some £100m in anger at the suggestion that the College might give in to the campaign, and the chair of the Commons Select Committee on Education said that she should consider her position, as the College had allowed the issue to spiral out of control. There have been calls from academics for her to resign. It was also reported that the College might have to make staff redundant as a result of the loss of donor income. She stepped down as Provost in August 2018, and was succeeded by Neil Mendoza.

In 2014, she was elected an honorary fellow of Trinity College Dublin.

== Offices held ==
Government offices
| New office | Permanent Secretary of the Department for Energy and Climate Change; 2008–2013 | Next: Stephen Lovegrove |
Academic offices
| Preceded by Sir Derek Morris | Provost of Oriel College, Oxford; 2013–2018 | Succeeded by Neil Mendoza |
