= Alfred S. Evans =

American viral epidemiologist

Alfred Spring Evans (August 21, 1917 – January 21, 1996) was an American viral epidemiologist and professor of epidemiology at the Yale University School of Medicine and the Yale School of Public Health.

== Early life and education ==
Evans was born on August 21, 1917, in Buffalo, New York, to John H. Evans, an anesthesiologist, and his wife, Ellen Spring. He received his undergraduate degree from the University of Michigan in 1939 and his medical degree from the University of Buffalo in 1943.

== Career ==
Evans served as a public health officer in Japan as part of his active duty service during World War II, where he became interested in the work of epidemiologist John R. Paul. He subsequently received a fellowship to study infectious mononucleosis with Paul at Yale. During the Korean War, he returned to active duty and served as chief of the Hepatitis Research Laboratory at the 98th General Hospital in Munich, Germany. In 1952, he became a professor at the University of Wisconsin School of Medicine. He subsequently went on sabbatical leave to earn an MPH degree from the University of Michigan. Upon his return to the University of Wisconsin in 1959, he became the first chairman of the Department of Preventive Medicine. He became a professor of epidemiology at the Yale School of Public Health in 1966. In 1982, he was appointed the John Rodman Paul Professor of Epidemiology at the Yale School of Medicine, a position he retained until he retired in 1994. At the Yale School of Medicine, he was also the director of their serum reference bank. He served as the president of the American College of Epidemiology in 1989.

== Death ==
Evans died on January 21, 1996, at his home in North Branford, Connecticut, at the age of 78. According to his family, he died from complications from cancer.
