= Peter Englander =

British businessman

Dr Peter David Englander OBE (1951–2023) was the former chairman of Bridges Fund Management, a director of Apax Partners, chairman of its Approval Committee, member of the Investment and Exit Committee, and the chief executive of the Apax Foundation.

== Early life ==
Englander won a Kennedy Scholarship to the MIT Sloan School of Management, from which he graduated with an M.S. in management. He received a B.S., with first class honors, in chemical engineering from the University of Manchester Institute of Science and Technology. He subsequently obtained a Ph.D. from the London Business School in the area of economics of innovation.

== Career ==
Englander joined Apax Partners in 1981 and was based in its office in London, United Kingdom. Englander specializes in investments in technology and telecommunications sectors. His deals on behalf of the firm include: Demon Internet, Dr Solomon's, Eyretel, QXL, and Waterstone. Overall, he has been associated with ten IPOs and 19 trade sales for the firm’s portfolio companies.

Previously, Englander worked for Air Products and then for the Boston Consulting Group for three years before joining the firm, when the first U.K. fund was raised. He is chairman of Bridges Ventures.

He served as a trustee of the Kennedy Memorial Trust.

Englander was appointed Officer of the Order of the British Empire (OBE) in the 2020 New Year Honours for services to charity and philanthropy.

== Personal life ==
Peter was married and had three sons.
