= Havens Hospices =

English hospice

Havens Hospices is a charity (No:1022119) which runs hospice services in Essex. It is intended to support and provide palliative care to babies, children, young adults and adults. Havens Hospices offers community based support (hospice at home care) to families in Essex and runs two hospice services: Fair Havens Hospice and Little Havens Hospice.

== History ==
It opened in Westcliff-on-Sea on 13 June 1983 and cared for 25,000 adults across Southend, Rochford, and Castle Point between 1983 and 2018.

Little Havens, children's hospice, opened its doors on March 4, 1998, and began caring for children and families providing much-needed respite, day stay sessions, and care at the end of a child's life.

After 65 weeks of construction on 9 March 2020, new Fair Havens Hospice which has a 16 bed in patient unit, a day hospice, family support, wellbeing and charity administrative spaces. The £17.2 million facility was officially handed over to Chief Executive of Havens Hospices, Steve Smith, marking a new era for hospice care for people in South East Essex

In March 2021, the new Fair Havens Hospice celebrated its first year of opening and welcoming its first patient. Take a 3D virtual Tour of the new facilities.

== Scope of work ==
Fair Havens provides care and support to adults, from the age of 19, living with incurable conditions in Southend, Castle Point and Rochford.

Little Havens cares for babies, children and young adults with life-limiting or life-threatening conditions. Little Havens is the only place in Essex totally dedicated to caring for children and young people with life-limiting illnesses.

Havens Hospices offer the following care options: Planned respite care, Emergency end of life care, Symptom Management, Post bereavement care and Emergency Respite (if they are able to accommodate this).

== Patrons and ambassadors ==
Peter Shilton is one of its patrons. Sophie Austin became a patron for Little Havens Hospices during 2018. Rudolph Walker is also patron for Havens Hospices. Su Harrison (Radio Essex presenter) has been a patron for Havens Hospices for many years, and volunteers with the charity at several events including hosting its virtual quizzes. In 2023 Simon Webb became a patron for Little Havens and his wife, Ashen Webb became an Ambassador. In 2026, Ferne McCann became the latest Patron of Little Havens at the Havens Hospices Gala Ball in May 2026.

== Shops ==
The Havens Hospices Charity Shops are important for their fundraising, their branches cover a large part of south and mid-Essex.

They opened a charity shop in Basildon, Southernhay, during 2015.

A new charity shop outlet located near its adult hospice Fair Havens was opened in April 2021.

More than 25 years after opening, the Havens Hospices' Leigh Road shop was given a sustainability focused refurbishment.

In April 2024 Havens Hospices opened a new charity shop under its Re:loved brand on Leigh Broadway which sells a wide variety of pre-loved vintage goods.

In October 2024 Havens Hospices opened a new charity shop in Maldon Highstreet.

In November 2024, the charity launched a clothing initiative, Mystery Bags, to help reduce clothing waste whilst generating more funds from clothes that may otherwise be recycled. The Mystery Bags contain items that are quality-checked and curated to ensure each one contains a mix of clothing. The bags are then categorised based on style with Havens Hospice currently offering Y2K, Cottage Core, Night Out, All Black, Casual, Festival, and Masculine bags and hoping to offer more options soon.

== Legacy ==
Daphne Hall, who was one of the founders of Fair Havens Hospice and Little Havens Hospice was awarded an MBE in 1998 for her work.

== Fundraising ==
Notable events for the charity include the Southend Half Marathon, a 13.1 miles route in Southend-on-Sea and the Havens Hospices Gala Ball. In 2024 Diversity where special guests at the Havens Hospices Gala Ball which raised over £100,000 for the charity.

Havens Hospices offers a wide range of challenges, including treks. In 2024 two Havens Hospices nurses trekked the Sahara Desert and then took part in a community project which raised thousands for the charity they worked for.

In January 2025, the charity's annual Christmas Tree collection where volunteers collect Christmas trees throughout postcodes SS0 – SS9 for a donation to the charity. The collection raised £14,000.

In March 2025 the charity held its Big Essex Corporate Quiz which saw teams from corporate companies come together to raise over £9,000 for local hospice care.

Havens Hospices launched Glow, a new night time fundraising event, in September 2025 where supporters raised over £25,000 by completing a 5k or 10k walk wearing glow in the dark and neon outfits.

== Art Trails ==
Hares About Town, a public art event in partnership with Wild in Art, took place in Southend on Sea in July 2021 for ten weeks. A total of 57 hare sculptures were designed by an artist and displayed in multiple locations across the town. The collection of hare sculptures were then auctioned off, raising a total of £225,931. The overall total of money raised through the Hares About Town project was a magnificent £447,000.

After the success of Hares About Town in 2021, Havens Hospices announced that they would be partnering with Wild in Art for a second art trail in the Summer 2023. The art trail, 'Herd In The City', launched on Friday 14 July 2023. The event saw 46 large elephant sculptures and 72 baby elephants take to the streets of Southend, Shoeburyness and Leigh.

Havens Hospice held a Farewell event where fans of the trail visited the Saxon Hall to see all 118 elephants before they went off to auction. The Farewell Weekend raised over £17,000. The Herd In The City auction then raised £180,000 which brought the grand total raised for the whole art trail to £580,000.

After two successful art trails Havens Hospices launched their third art trail Waddle-on-Sea which saw a huddle of 31 super-sized penguin sculptures, designed by artists, and a huddle of 72 small penguin sculptures created by schools and community groups, turning the city into an outdoor art gallery. The art trail took place from Friday 11 July to Wednesday 3 September and raised £580,000 to support hospice care across Essex. The trail attracted over 165,000 participants - twice the engagement of Havens Hospices’ previous Herd In The City event.
