= Cricket: A Weekly Record of the Game =

English cricket magazine

- Front Page Banner
- Cricket Editors: C. W. Alcock; F. S. Ashley-Cooper; J. N. Pentelow
- The World of Cricket Editors: A. C. MacLaren; J. N. Pentelow
- Frequency: Weekly
- Format: A4
- Publisher: Merritt & Hatcher Ltd
- First issue: May 10, 1882; 143 years ago
- Final issue Number: October 14, 1914; Vol. 32, no. 949
- Country: UK
- Based in: London

Cricket: A Weekly Record of the Game was a British cricket magazine, published in London, which ran from 1882 to 1913. It has often been referenced as just Cricket.

== Publication ==
In most years, the magazine was published monthly from January until March, had 24 weekly parts from April to September, and was monthly again from October to December, giving a total of 30 issues. Exceptions were Volume I which only started on 10 May 1882 and had just 22 issues, and Volume II (1883) which had 27 issues. In all, Cricket ran to 949 issues in 32 annual volumes. Issues were generally of 16 pages, approximately 27 cm by 21 cm.

Cricket was briefly superseded by The World of Cricket which ran for 23 issues in 1914. World War I put an end to its run, its last issue being on 14 November 1914. The idea of a weekly cricket periodical was continued after the war by Pelham Warner who founded The Cricketer, which began publication in 1921.

Online, there is a complete run of the magazine from 1882 to 1914 by the Association of Cricket Statisticians and Historians (the ACS). Appended to it is an extensive list of the obituaries it published.

== Features ==
One of the regular features from the first issue onwards was "Pavilion Gossip" in which the editor presented short news items, often gleaned from other publications around the world. There was considerable statistical output in the form of match scorecards, batting averages, bowling averages and the like. There would tend to be a feature about a particular county club each time and the front page often showcased a cricketing personality. The magazine would sometimes serialise a work about cricket: for example, Volume I republished The Cricketers of My Time by John Nyren over several issues. Another was At the Sign of the Wicket by F. S. Ashley-Cooper, a history of cricket from 1742 to 1751, serialised through several issues of Volume XIX in 1900.

== Editors ==
Cricket had just three editors in its 32 years of publication.

- C. W. Alcock (1882–1907)
- F. S. Ashley-Cooper (1907–1911)
- J. N. Pentelow (1911–1913)

The World of Cricket (1914) was edited by Archie MacLaren and J. N. Pentelow.

== Bibliography ==
- Cricket: A Weekly Record of the Game (1882–1913). Merritt & Hatcher Ltd, London OCLC 28863559
