= Lancelot Phelps (priest) =

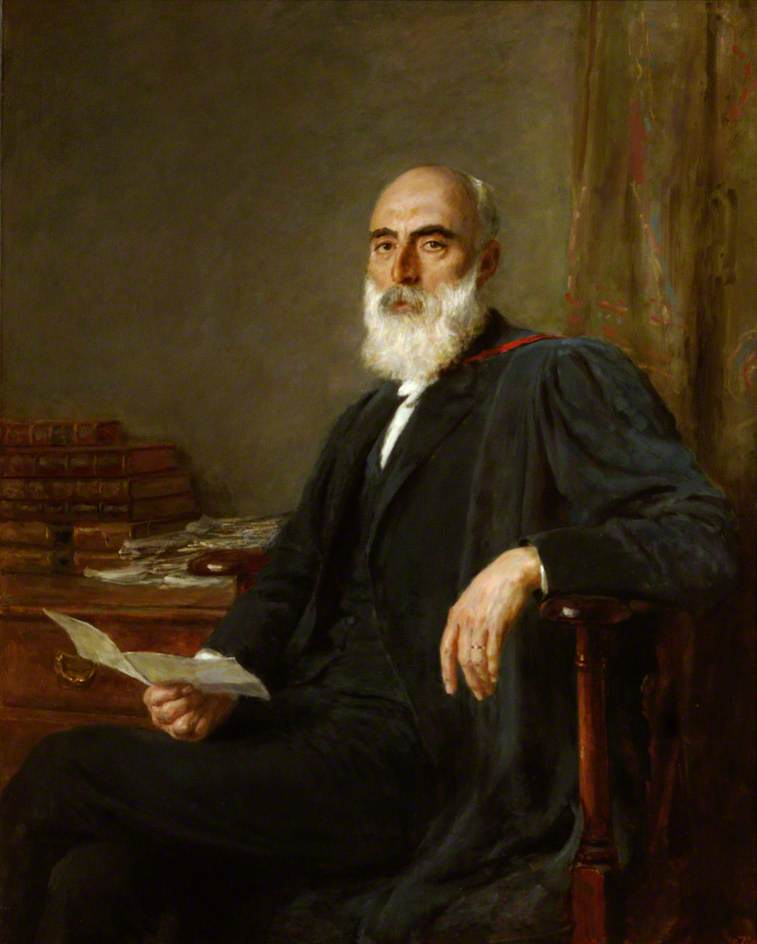
Portrait of Lancelot Ridley Phelps (1853–1936), Provost of Oriel College, Oxford.

Lancelot Ridley Phelps (b Sevenoaks 3 November 1853; d Oxford 16 December 1936) was Provost of Oriel College, Oxford from 1914 to 1930.

Phelps was educated at Charterhouse and Oriel College, Oxford, where he matriculated in 1872, graduating B.A. in 1877. He was ordained as a deacon in the Church of England in 1879, but not as a priest until 1896. His career was spent as a Fellow and Tutor at Oriel. He was also an Alderman of Oxford and a member of the Royal Commission on the Poor Laws and Relief of Distress from 1905 to 1909.

Academic offices
Preceded by Charles Lancelot Shadwell	Provost of Oriel College, Oxford; 1914–1930	Succeeded by David Ross
