= Charles L. Shadwell =

Provost of Oriel College, Oxford

Charles Lancelot Shadwell (16 December 1840, London – 13 February 1919, Oxford) was Provost of Oriel College, Oxford, from 1905 until 1914.

Shadwell was educated at Westminster School and Christ Church, Oxford, where he matriculated in 1859 and graduated B.A. in 1863. He was subsequently a Fellow of Oriel. He was called to the bar in 1872 and lectured at Oxford on jurisprudence.

Academic offices
Preceded by David Binning Monro	Provost of Oriel College, Oxford; 1905–1914	Succeeded by Lancelot Ridley Phelps
