= List of Commissioners' churches in southwest England =

A Commissioners' church is an Anglican church in the United Kingdom built with money voted by Parliament as a result of the Church Building Act 1818, and subsequent related Acts. Such churches have been given a number of titles, including "Commissioners' Churches", "Waterloo Churches" and "Million Act Churches". In some cases the Commissioners provided the full cost of the new church; in other cases they provided a grant and the balance was raised locally. This list contains the Commissioners' churches in South West England.

== Key ==
Grade	Criteria
Grade I	Buildings of exceptional interest, sometimes considered to be internationally important.
Grade II*	Particularly important buildings of more than special interest.
Grade II	Buildings of national importance and special interest.
"—" denotes a work that is not graded.

== Churches ==
Name and location	Photograph	Date	Grant in £	Architect	Notes and refs.	Grade
Holy Trinity, Bath, Somerset	—	1819–22	4,000	John Lowder	Gothic Revival with a southwest tower and spire. Bombed 1942; demolished 1957.	—
All Saints, Lower Brixham, Devon; 50.3954°N 3.5162°W		c. 1819–24	1,552	Thomas Lidstone	Gothic Revival style. Rebuilt 1894–1906 possibly incorporating parts of the original church.	II
Holy Trinity, Kingswood, Gloucestershire; 51.4620°N 2.5039°W		c. 1820–21	2,457	James Foster	Gothic Revival with a tower. Chancel added 1889.	II*
St George, Brandon Hill, Bristol; 51.4543°N 2.6038°W		1821–23	9,263	Robert Smirke	Neoclassical Doric with a portico and cupola.	II*
St Paul, Starcross, Devon; 50.6252°N 3.4494°W		1826–27	1,491	Charles Hedgeland	Greek style with a cupola. Rebuilt 1854.	II
St Paul, Chacewater, Cornwall; 50.2537°N 5.1564°W		1826–28	2,976	Charles Hutchins	Gothic Revival with a tower. Rebuilt other than the tower 1892.	II
Holy Trinity, St Day, Cornwall; 50.2374°N 5.1839°W		1826–28	3,178	Charles Hutchins	Gothic Revival with a west tower. Derelict.	II
St Mary, Redruth, Cornwall	—	1827–28	1,523	Charles Hutchins	Gothic Revival with a west turret. Demolished.	—
St John, Truro, Cornwall; 50.2601°N 5.0537°W		1827–28	1,407	Philip Sambell	Neoclassical with a bell turret. Altered 1893–1900.	II
St Saviour, Bath, Somerset; 51.3957°N 2.3464°W		1829–31	4,263	John Pinch the younger	Gothic Revival with a west tower. Chancel added 1882.	II*
St Paul, Cheltenham, Gloucestershire; 51.9070°N 2.0772°W		1829–31	3,626	John Forbes	Neoclassical Ionic with a portico and tower. Additions in 1917.	II*
Holy Trinity, Bristol; 51.4581°N 2.5760°W		1829–32	6,031	Thomas Rickman and Henry Hutchinson	Gothic Revival with two turrets and a clerestory. Enlarged 1889.	II*
St Mark, Bath, Somerset; 51.3765°N 2.3585°W		1830–31	4,840	George Phillips Manners	Gothic Revival with a west tower. Chancel added 1883; redundant since 1972.	II
St Paul, East Stonehouse, Plymouth, Devon	—	1830–31	3,180	John Foulston	Gothic Revival with a tower. Chancel added 1891. Demolished.	—
Christ Church, Warminster, Wiltshire; 51.2000°N 2.1864°W		1830–31	1,755	John Leachman	Gothic Revival with a tower. Chancel added 1871, nave arcades 1881.	II
Christ Church, Shaw, Wiltshire; 51.3904°N 2.1614°W		1836–38	400	Thomas Henry Wyatt	Gothic Revival styles. Steeple added 1905.	II*
Holy Trinity, Selwood, Frome, Somerset; 51.2339°N 2.3280°W	—	1836–39	300	Henry Goodridge	Gothic Revival with a northeast tower and spirelets.	II*
Holy Trinity, Trowbridge, Wiltshire; 51.3187°N 2.2147°W		1837–38	1,676	A. F. Livesay	Gothic Revival with a tower.	II*
Holy Trinity, Bridgwater, Somerset	—	1838–39	962	Richard Carver	Gothic Revival style. Restored 1876; demolished.	—
Christ Church, Coxley, St Cuthbert Out, Somerset; 51.1870°N 2.6795°W		1838–39	250	Richard Carver	Gothic Revival style.	II
Holy Trinity, Stroudshill, Stroud, Gloucestershire; 51.7433°N 2.2083°W	—	1838–40	1,142	James Foster	Gothic Revival with a bell turret.	II
Christ Church, Derry Hill, Wiltshire; 51.4372°N 2.0551°W		1839–40	250	Thomas Henry Wyatt and David Brandon	Gothic Revival with a tower and spire.	II
St Paul, Whiteshill, Gloucestershire; 51.7598°N 2.2321°W		1839–41	400	James Foster	Norman Revival with a tower. Transepts added 1882.	II
Holy Trinity, Plymouth, Devon	—	1840–42	1,000	George Wightwick	Italian style with a bell turret. Ddemolished.	—
Christ Church, Bradford on Avon, Wiltshire; 51.3510°N 2.2490°W		1841	350	George Phillips Manners	Gothic Revival with a tower and spire. Chancel added 1878.	II*
St Luke, Bristol; 51.4544°N 2.5640°W	—	1842–43	500	Samuel Welch	Gothic Revival with a tower, cupola and spire.	II
St Paul, Easton, St Cuthbert Out, Somerset; 51.2257°N 2.6982°W		1842–43	150	Richard Carver	Norman Revival with transepts.	II
St Michael, Devonport, Devon	—	1843–45	1,000	Benjamin Ferrey	Gothic Revival with a bell gable and turret. Bombed 1942; demolished.	—
Holy Trinity, Dilton Marsh, Wiltshire; 51.2472°N 2.2171°W		1844	400	Thomas Henry Wyatt	Norman Revival with a tower and transepts.	II*
Christ Church, Plymouth, Devon	—	1844–45	1,000	George Wightwick	Tudor Revival with bell turrets. Altered 1876; demolished.	—
St Mary Magdalene, Barnstaple, Devon	—	1845–46	500	Benjamin Ferrey	Gothic Revival with a tower. Demolished about 1977.	—
St Simon, Bristol	—	1846–47	300	Samuel Gabriel and John Hicks	Gothic Revival with a tower and spire. Altered 1876.	—
St Michael, Baldhu, Cornwall	—	1847–48	200	William White	Demolished 1991.	—
St Michael, Bristol; 51.4619°N 2.5211°W		1847–48	100	Samuel Gabriel	Gothic Revival style. Altered 1897.	II
Holy Trinity, Carnmenellis, Cornwall	—	1848–51	150	John Hayward	Gothic Revival with a bell turret. Demolished.	—
St George, Truro, Cornwall; 50.2643°N 5.0591°W		1848–55	100	Rev. W. Haslam	Gothic Revival with a transepts, and a tower.	II
St Jude, Bristol; 51.4574°N 2.5800°W		c. 1849	275	Samuel Gabriel	Gothic Revival style. Redundant.	II
St Paul, Charlestown, Cornwall; 50.3361°N 4.7607°W		1849–50	250	Christopher Eales	Gothic Revival with transepts.	II
St Paul, Devonport, Devon	—	1849–50	350	J. P. St Aubyn	Gothic Revival with a spire. Bombed 1942; demolished.	—
St James, Devonport, Devon	—	1849–51	400	J. P. St Aubyn	Gothic Revival with a southwest steeple. Bombed 1942; demolished.	—
St John the Baptist, Godolphin Cross, Cornwall; 50.1333°N 5.3466°W		1849–51	220	J. P. St Aubyn	Gothic Revival style. Redundant since 2002.	II
St Peter, Treverbyn, Cornwall; 50.3799°N 4.7897°W	—	1849–51	150	G. E. Street	Gothic Revival with a west bell gable.	II
St Mary, Devonport, Devon	—	1850–51	350	J. P. St Aubyn	Gothic Revival with a tower and spire. Bombed 1942; converted.	—
Holy Jesus Church, Lydbrook, Gloucestershire; 51.8384°N 2.5761°W		1850–51	100	Henry Woodyer	Gothic Revival with a tower. Altered 1913.	II
St John the Evangelist, Tatworth, Somerset; 50.8478°N 2.9574°W		1850–51	300	John Pinch the younger	Gothic Revival style.	II
St John the Baptist, Pendeen, Cornwall; 50.1501°N 5.6653°W		1850–52	200	Rev. R. Aitken	Gothic Revival with a tower.	—
Holy Trinity, Penponds, Cornwall; 50.2068°N 5.3159°W	—	1850–54	150	J. P. St Aubyn	Gothic Revival style.	—
St John the Evangelist, Plymouth, Devon; 50.3703°N 4.1283°W	—	1851–55	300	Benjamin Ferrey	Gothic Revival with a tower and spire.	II
St Luke, Cheltenham, Gloucestershire; 51.8947°N 2.0729°W	—	1853–54	250	Frederick Ordish	Gothic Revival with a west tower, spire and transepts. Altered 1866.	II
St Clement, Bristol	—	1854–55	100	Samuel Gabriel and Hurst	Gothic Revival with a bell turret. Rebuilt.	—

== See also ==
- List of Commissioners' churches in eastern England
- List of Commissioners' churches in the English Midlands
- List of Commissioners' churches in London
- List of Commissioners' churches in Northeast and Northwest England
- List of Commissioners' churches in Wales
- List of Commissioners' churches in Yorkshire
