= St John's Church, East Horrington =

Church in Somerset, England

St John's Church
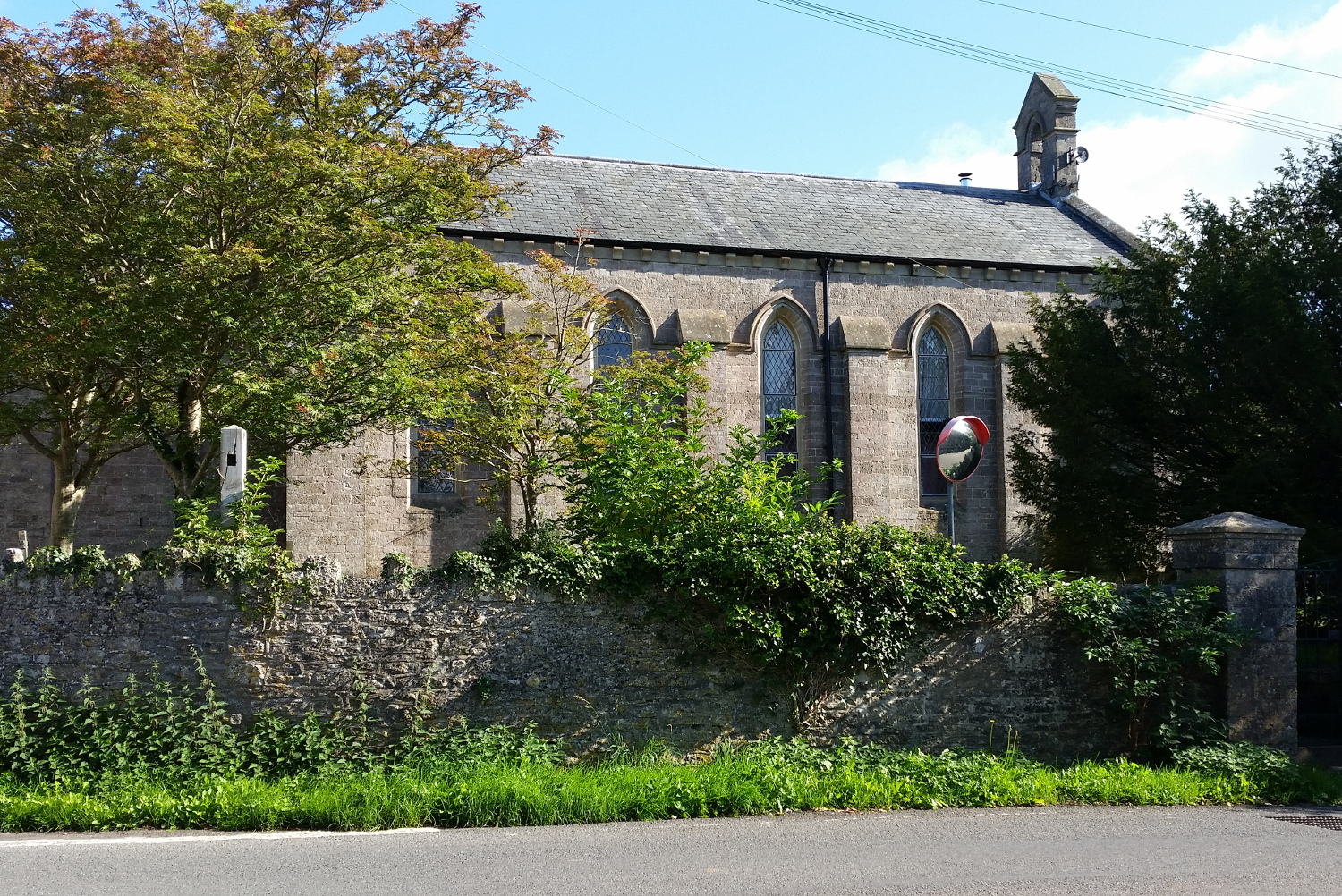

Religion
- Affiliation: Church of England
- Ecclesiastical or organizational status: Redundant
- Year consecrated: 1838; 188 years ago

Location
- Location: East Horrington, Somerset, England
- Interactive map of St John's Church
- Coordinates: 51.2181°N 2.6006°W

Architecture
- Architect: Richard Carver
- Type: Church
- Style: Early English
- Established: 1838; 188 years ago

St John's Church is a former Church of England church in East Horrington, Somerset, England. It was built in 1838 to the designs of Richard Carver and closed in 1975. The former church is now converted to residential use and is a Grade II listed building.

== History ==
St John's was built as a chapel of ease to the parish church of St Cuthbert's in St Cuthbert Out. Owing to the insufficient accommodation provided by St Cuthbert's and its considerable distance for some of the parishioners, chapel of eases were built at East Horrington and Coxley to improve church accommodation in the parish. St John's was built to serve East Horrington, West Horrington, Chilcot, Witnel and Haydon, which amounted to 400 inhabitants, all of whom lived at least two miles from the parish church. Funds were raised by public subscription and a grant was also received from the Bath and Wells Diocesan Church Building Association.

The plans for the church were drawn up by Richard Carver of Taunton. It was designed to accommodate 253 people, with 170 of the seats being free and unappropriated. The completed church cost approximately £1,000 to build and was consecrated by the Bishop of Bath and Wells, the Right Rev. George Henry Law, on 4 October 1838. On the day, the morning service was read by the vicar, Rev. Canon Barnard, and a sermon preached by Rev. S. Blackall, the rector of North Cadbury and a prebendary of Wells. East and West Horrington formed their own ecclesiastical parish (as Horrington) on 14 September 1844.

Fundraising began in 1896 for the restoration and reseating of the church, with the plans drawn up by the Diocesan architect Edward Buckle. The work was carried out in 1899–1900 and the church's reopening services were held on 2 and 4 February 1900. The Archdeacon of Taunton, the Ven. Alexander Ainslie, preached on 2 February and the Bishop of Bath and Wells, the Right Rev. George Kennion, on 4 February.

Fundraising for another restoration began in the late 1950s but was delayed when the organ of the closed church of St James at East Cranmore was offered to St John's for £700. The organ was duly purchased and dedicated by the Assistant Bishop of Bath and Wells, the Right Rev. Douglas Wilson, on 8 November 1961. In 1962, new reredos created by Faith-Craft studio of Westminster were installed at the church.

St John's was restored in 1963, with the work being carried out by James A. Pope of Wells for an approximate cost of £500. The completion of the restoration was celebrated by a thanksgiving service on 13 June 1963. As part of the project, new communion rails were installed in memory of Frederick Arthurs, a former churchwarden and postmaster at Horrington. They were dedicated by the Bishop of Taunton, the Right Rev. Francis West, during the thanksgiving service. The new rails were created from those taken from the former church at East Cranmore.

In 1975, the parish of Horrington was united with Wells St Thomas, resulting in St John's being declared redundant by the Church of England on 1 December 1975. A scheme drawn up by the Church Commissioners to sell the former church for residential use was approved by an Order in Council on 11 October 1977.

The churchyard continues to be maintained by the Church of England. In 1982, some repair work was carried out on the boundary walls of the churchyard and new gates installed. Some memorials from the former church were mounted onto a new wall in the churchyard. By 1990, the church building had planning permission for conversion into a residence or commercial workshops. A partial conversion had taken place by this time, with the installation of a shower room, airing cupboard and kitchen. In 1995, permission was approved to complete the building's conversion into a single residence. In 2021, the former church was purchased by new owners, who carried out a full restoration and internal alterations prior to offering the church as a luxury holiday rental, 'the Gothic Church', from 2023 via the accommodation booking platform CoolStays.

== Architecture ==
St John's is built of local coursed and squared rubble stone, with slate roofs. It is made up of a five-bay nave, chancel, south vestry and west porch. The west end gable has a bell-cot designed for a single bell and the east gable is surmounted by a cruciform finial. Since the church's closure, the interior has been altered.
