= Christ Church, Coxley =

Church in Somerset, England

Christ Church
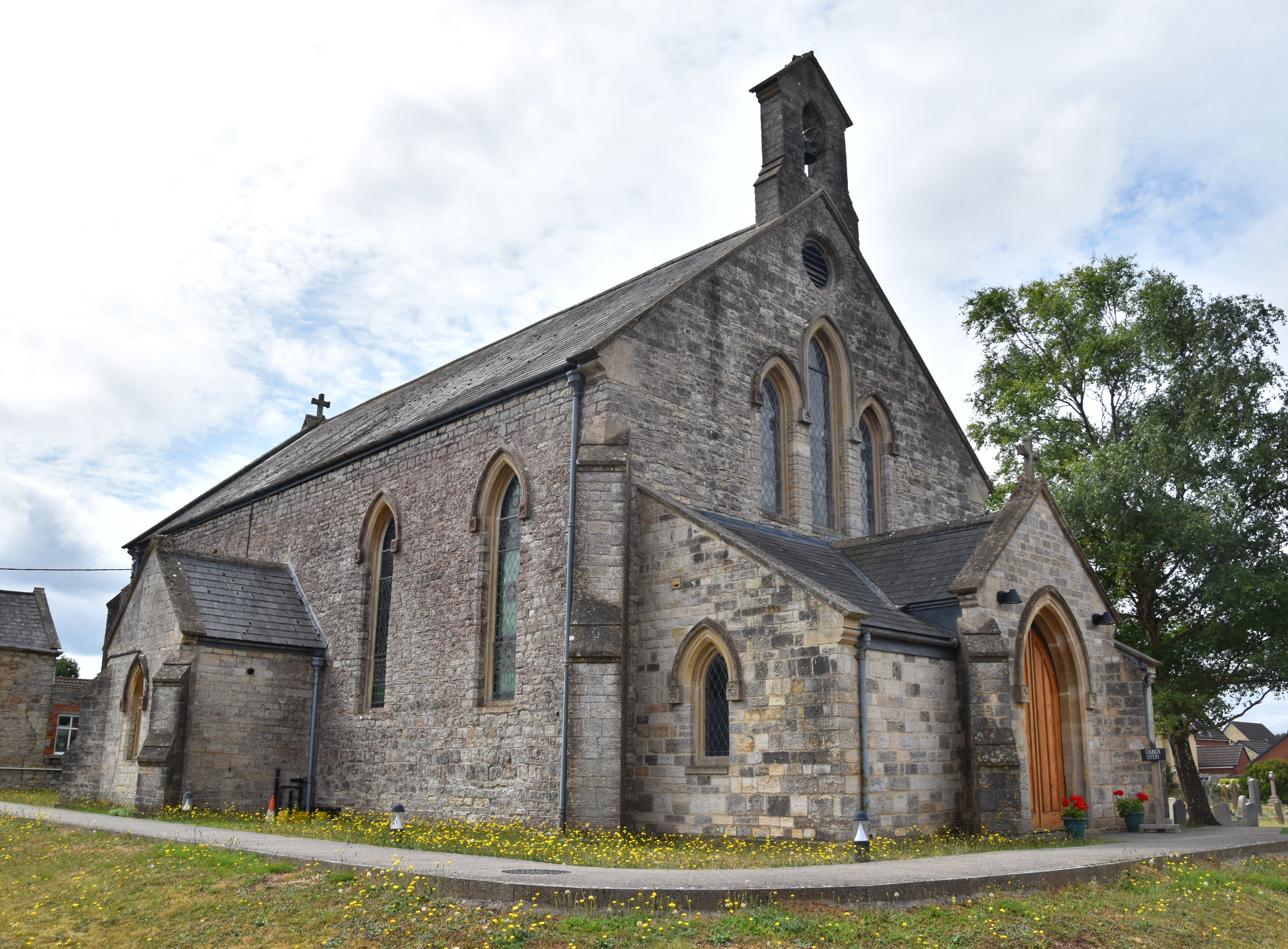

Religion
- Affiliation: Church of England
- Ecclesiastical or organisational status: Active
- Year consecrated: 1840

Location
- Location: Coxley, Somerset, England
- Interactive map of Christ Church
- Coordinates: 51.1870°N 2.6794°W

Architecture
- Architect: Richard Carver
- Type: Church
- Style: Early English

Christ Church is a Church of England church in Coxley, Somerset, England. It was built in 1839–40 to the designs of Richard Carver and is a Grade II listed building.

== History ==
Christ Church was built as a chapel of ease to the parish church of St Cuthbert's in St Cuthbert Out. Owing to the insufficient accommodation provided by the parish church and its considerable distance for some of the parishioners, chapel of eases were built at East Horrington (St John's) and Coxley to improve church accommodation for St Cuthbert Out. Christ Church was built to serve an area of the parish containing approximately 500 inhabitants, including at Coxley and Polsham. Funds were raised by public subscription and a grant from the Bath and Wells Diocesan Church Building Association.

Construction of the church began in 1839 to the designs of Richard Carver of Taunton. The church was designed to accommodate 270 people, with 196 of the seats being free and unappropriated. The completed building was consecrated by the Bishop of Bath and Wells, the Right Rev. George Henry Law, on 23 June 1840. The event also saw a sermon preached by Rev. J. H. Pinder, one of the Bishop's chaplains and a professor of theology. Coxley was made its own ecclesiastical parish on 14 September 1844.

Christ Church was restored and reseated in 1903–04 for an approximate cost of £500. The plans were drawn up by the Diocesan architect Mr. Edmund Buckle and the work was carried out by Messrs. Dell Brothers of Wells. Work began in September 1903 and the church was reopened on 27 February 1904, the event being attended by the Bishop of Bath and Wells, the Right Rev. George Kennion, among other clergy in the diocese. Prior to the restoration, the church's walls were in "urgent need of thorough repair" and the building also required reseating and reheating, particularly as the existing pews were considered uncomfortable and impractical.

Shortly after work began, it was discovered that the church's flooring was also in need of replacement. A new floor of wooden blocks was laid in order to allow the new benches to be installed, and tiles laid in the aisle. The church's walls, gallery and font were all restored, the interior redecorated, new benches of Austrian oak installed, the pulpit relocated, the trusses of the roof altered and the east window raised and enlarged. A new oak pulpit was also gifted by friends and parishioners in memory of Rev. Dr. R. T. Wallace, the late vicar of Coxley.

A new gateway into the churchyard was built in 1963, owing to the danger posed by passing traffic for parishioners using the original gate off the main road. Repair and redecoration work to the church's interior was carried out around 1997. Today the church forms part of the benefice of Coxley with Godney, Henton and Wookey.

== Architecture ==
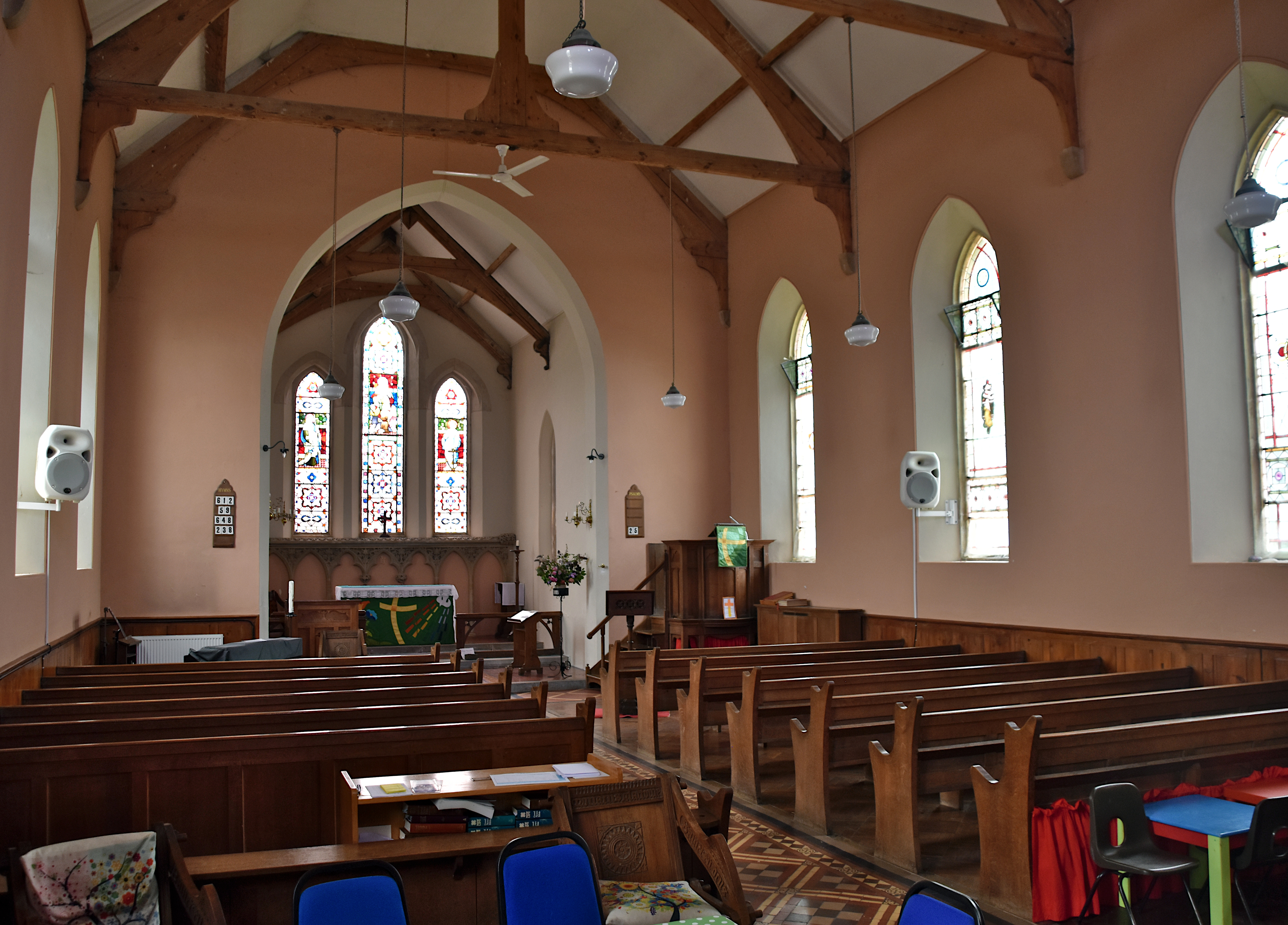
The interior of Christ Church.

Christ Church is built of coursed and squared rubble stone, with a slate roof. It is made up of a five-bay nave, chancel, west porch and north vestry. The roof's west gable has a bell-cot with a single bell and the west end of the nave contains a gallery designed for the organ and choir. The church's organ was built by Sweetland of Bath in 1857 and later rebuilt in 1936 by W.G. Vowles Ltd of Bristol.
