= Holy Trinity Church, Blackford =

Church in Somerset, England

Holy Trinity Church
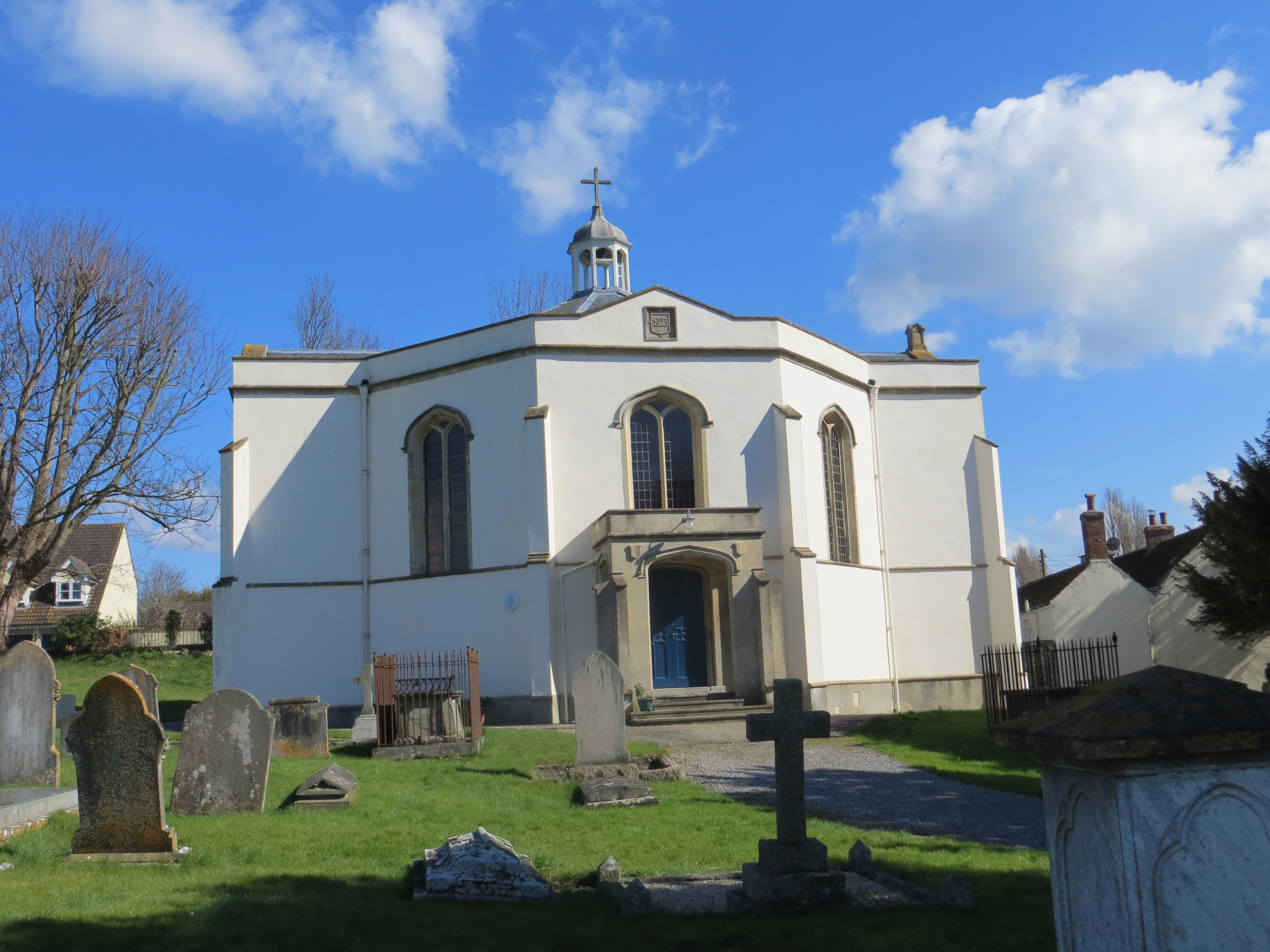

Religion
- Affiliation: Church of England
- Ecclesiastical or organizational status: Active
- Year consecrated: 1823

Location
- Location: Blackford, Somerset, England
- Interactive map of Holy Trinity Church
- Coordinates: 51.2259°N 2.8479°W

Architecture
- Architect: Richard Carver
- Type: Church

Holy Trinity Church is a Church of England church in Blackford, Somerset, England. It was built in 1821–23 to the designs of Richard Carver and has been a Grade II listed building since 1961.

== History ==
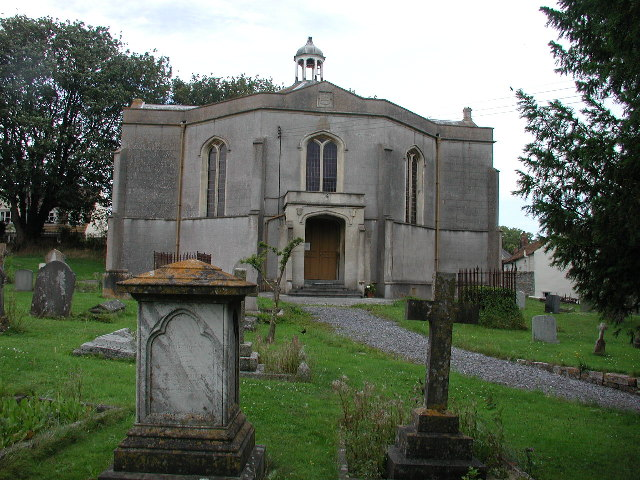
Holy Trinity in 2004, prior to restoration.

Holy Trinity Church was built as a chapel of ease to the parish church of St Mary in Wedmore. As a result of the growing population of the parish during the early 19th century, the vicar of Wedmore, the Rev. John Richards, sought to provide additional church accommodation for the outlying parts of the parish. The population of Wedmore had reached over 3,000 and the parish church was only capable of accommodating 700 people. The hamlet of Blackford was selected as the location for the first chapel of ease, which would also serve the inhabitants of Westham and West Stoughton, all of whom were approximately two miles from the parish church.

Plans for the church were drawn up by Richard Carver of Taunton, with seating for 300 people, 200 of which would be free and unappropriated for the benefit of the poor. Construction began in 1821 and the completed church was consecrated by the Bishop of Gloucester and Dean of Wells, the Right Rev. Henry Ryder, on 29 August 1823. Blackford was made its own ecclesiastical parish on 11 October 1844.

In 1889, a public meeting was held to discuss the replacement of the church's harmonium with an organ. The harmonium was considered inadequate to conduct the choir and was also in a poor state of repair. The required £100 was successfully raised and the organ, built by Mr. W.G. Vowles of Bristol, was opened by the Bishop of Bath and Wells, the Right Rev. Lord Arthur Hervey, on 1 August 1890.

=== 19th and 20th century restorations ===
By the 1890s, Holy Trinity was in great need of repair, and the pews, side galleries and narrow aisles were described by the Central Somerset Gazette as "causing great discomfort to all who attended". The restoration was carried out by Messrs. Frederick Merrick and Son of Glastonbury in 1895 for a cost of £400. The work included the removal of the galleries in the north and south transepts and the raising of the holy table.

As part of the restoration, new fittings were installed, including communion rails, an octagonal stone font, a carved oak lectern, an oak prayer desk, and a carved and traceried oak pulpit. The font was gifted by the family of the Rev. John M. Hale Whish as a memorial to the late rector. The church was reseated with new pews of pitch pine, and some of the wood from the old pews were reused to create dado panelling. The church reopened on 3 October 1895, with sermons preached by the vicar of Cheddar, the Rev. Preb. Coleman, and the vicar of Burtle, the Rev. T. Lewis.

Another restoration of the church was carried out in 1914, owing to a defective roof and settlement of the walls, which had resulted in dampness and fungoid growth within the interior. Fundraising towards the restoration began in May 1913, and £200 of the £380 required had been raised by donations by April 1914. The restoration plans were drawn up by the Diocesan surveyor Percival Hartland Thomas and the church was reopened by the Bishop of Bath and Wells, the Right Rev. George Kennion, on 3 November 1914. In addition to repairs to the roof, walls and drains, the interior was also renovated.

In 1967, fundraising began towards a major repair of the church, particularly its roof, with an estimated £3,000 cost. The work was carried out in 1972, using donations and a £700 loan.

=== 21st century restoration ===
In 1999, the structural condition of Holy Trinity was found to be poor, with the building in need of major repairs. Furthermore, the church lacked some essential features including disabled access and running water. The Parochial church council launched an appeal to raise the necessary funds for the church's restoration and improvement for wider community uses. The first phase of work was completed in 2006 for over £130,000, which included repairs and repainting of parts of the internal rendering, replacing some of the external hard cement render with mortar, the construction of a new vestry with lavatory and disabled access, and the establishment of a tea bar. The work was carried out by T R Morgans and Co of Wells to designs by Caroe and Partners, Wells.

For the second phase of work, the church council were successful in obtaining a £120,000 grant from English Heritage among other donations and a Diocesan loan. The church's entire exterior was then refurbished and repaired, including the cupola, clock and western porch. A new roof was added and the timber trusses stabilised. The church's walls were painted white in line with the building's original colour. The work was carried out by Carrek Ltd to the designs of Benjamin and Beauchamp, Bare Leaning and Bare QS, and Mann Williams Engineers. In 2014, the final phase of work was completed, which saw the interior refurbished and improved with new heating, new lighting and electrical rewiring. The organ was re-sited from the western gallery and installed in the southern transept. Ellis and Co Ltd of Shepton Mallet carried out the work to the designs of Benjamin and Beauchamp. Blackford's village hall was used for services until the church reopened.

== Architecture ==
Holy Trinity is built of rendered Wedmore stone, with freestone dressings and a slate roof. The church is made up of a nave with gallery, chancel, vestry and west porch. The centre of the roof has an arcaded cupola containing one bell and surmounted by a cruciform. The church has an octagonal plan with projecting wings on each side. The entrance has a flat-roofed porch of ashlar stone.
