= Merrifield Children's Unit =

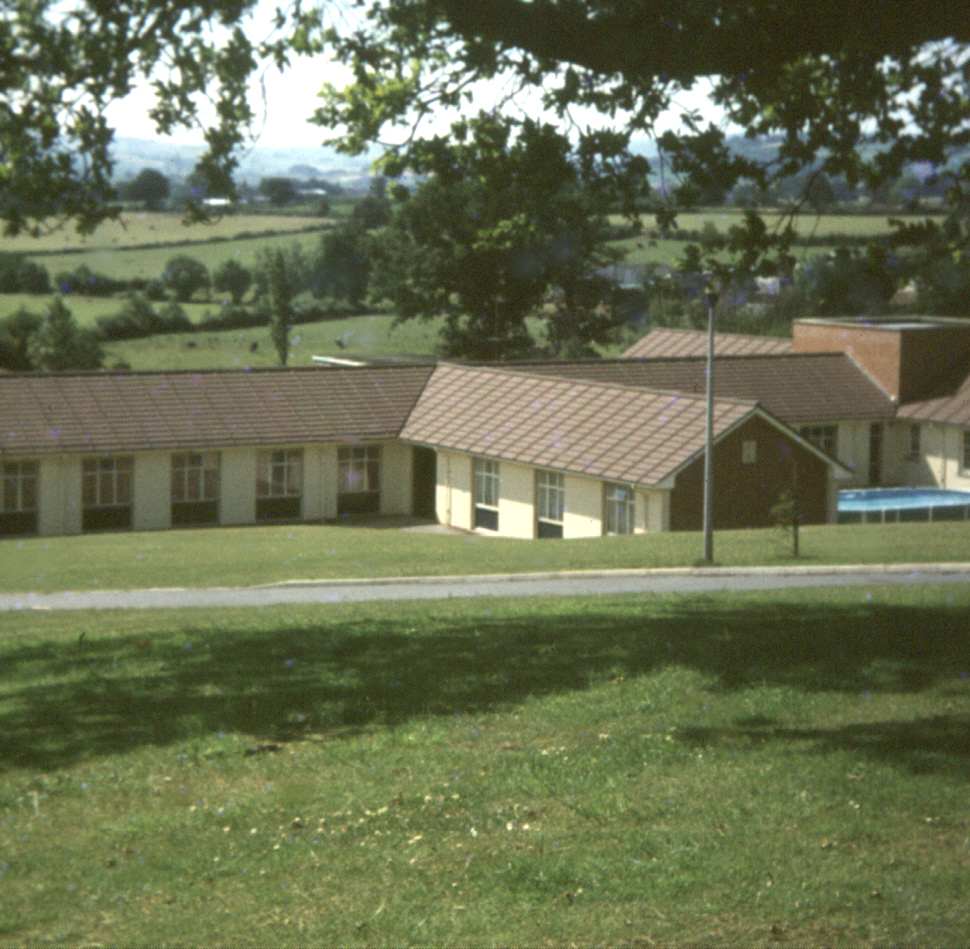
- View of the extended Merrifield Children's Unit, as officially opened in March 1976

- Shown in Somerset

Geography
- Location: Cotford St Luke, Somerset, England
- Coordinates: 51.0392°N 3.1886°W

Organisation
- Care system: NHS
- Type: Psychiatric institution for children

History
- Founded: 1950s
- Closed: 1995

Links
- Lists: Hospitals in England

Merrifield Children's Unit (also known as Merryfield or colloquially as Merrifields) was a residential children's and adolescents' psychiatric institution in the grounds of Tone Vale Hospital (an adult mental hospital) approximately 3 km (1.9 miles) north west of Norton Fitzwarren, near Taunton, Somerset, England, in what is now the village Cotford St Luke.

== History ==
The Merrifield Unit was established by psychiatrist Dr Martin Frank (known as 'Jim') Bethell (d. 1982) as a regional unit for the treatment of young people. By November 1961, it was catering for 36 'psychotic and maladjusted' children. In the mid-1970s, the Merrifield buildings were upgraded, and a substantial new extension was opened in March 1976 by Sir Desmond Pond.

The Unit served the whole of South West England, and for much of its existence its management was under the control of Dr Bethell and nursing officer Donald Mackey. Other child psychiatry specialists associated with Merrifield included Dr Adriaan Bakker and Dr Frank Bayley. Of the Merrifield patients, one observer notes, "Some of the children, although highly disturbed, were extremely well read and educated."

Tone Vale Hospital, Merrifield Unit's parent institution, was closed in 1995, as was Merrifield itself. The entire site is now occupied by the newly built village of Cotford St Luke. Merrifield is succeeded by the Orchard Lodge Young People's Unit located in Cotford St Luke.

== References and allusions in literature ==
In her memoir, The Light in My Mind, Joyce Passmore writes of being admitted to Merrifield in 1957 at the age of 13 suffering with epilepsy, prior to being transferred to the main adult hospital. The novel Delivered Unto Lions by David Austin is based on the experiences of a Merrifield patient in the 1970s.

== See also ==
- Healthcare in Somerset
- List of hospitals in England
