= Horrington =

Group of villages in Somerset, England

Coordinates: 51.2161°N 2.6098°W

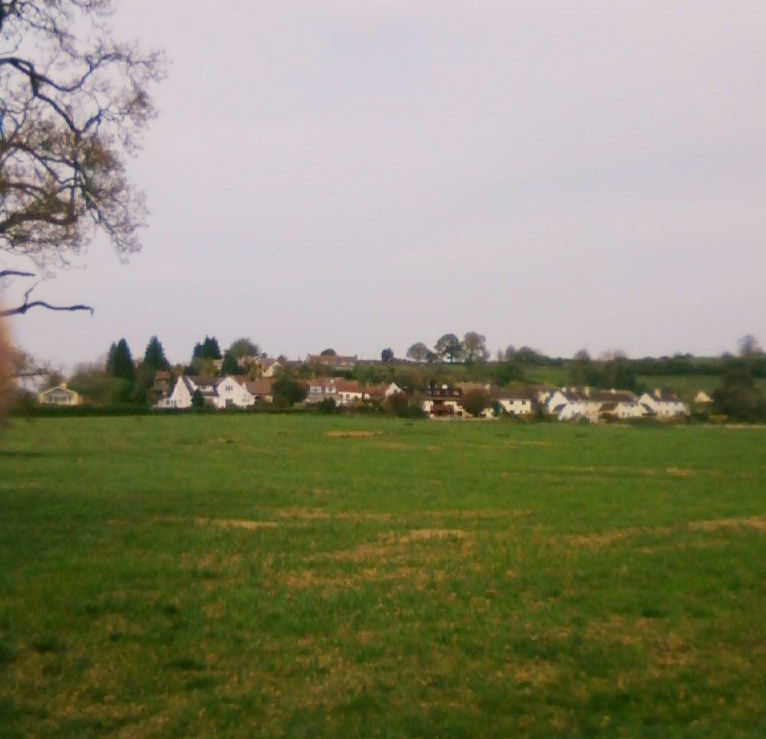
- West Horrington (Hill End side)

- Location within Somerset
- OS grid reference: ST575465
- Civil parish: St Cuthbert Out
- Unitary authority: Somerset Council
- Ceremonial county: Somerset
- Region: South West
- Country: England
- Sovereign state: United Kingdom
- Post town: WELLS
- Postcode district: BA5
- Dialling code: 01749
- Police: Avon and Somerset
- Fire: Devon and Somerset
- Ambulance: South Western
- UK Parliament: Wells and Mendip Hills

Horrington is a collection of three small villages (South Horrington, East Horrington and West Horrington) in the parish of St Cuthbert Out 1 mile (2 km) or 2 miles (3 km) east of Wells, Somerset, England.

South Horrington is a relatively new village created in the late 1990s from the defunct Mendip Hospital that was closed in 1991.

The original hospital opened on 1 March 1848 and was built to house 400 patients and staff. The principal architect was George Gilbert Scott, who is better known for his designs of St Pancras Station and the Albert Memorial in London.

His work has largely been retained and the main buildings have been converted into a range of flats and houses. Newer houses have been built on the original kitchen gardens and orchards although the front grounds remain largely unaltered.

The nearby Maesbury Railway Cutting of the Somerset and Dorset Joint Railway exposes approximately 135 metres of strata representing the middle and upper Lower Limestone Shales and the basal Black Rock Limestone. Both formations are of early Carboniferous (Courceyan) age.

William Catcott, born 27 Feb 1808 in West Horrington was known as the Baker Poet. He had a book of his poems called "Morning Musings" published which was about the local Mendip Hills and his family. He became a baker in Wells, Somerset and died on 13 Nov 1870. The local paper carried an obituary.

Wells Cricket Club are based in South Horrington.

The former church of St John at East Horrington was built in 1838 to the designs of Richard Carver.

== Gallery ==
South Horrington evening shot

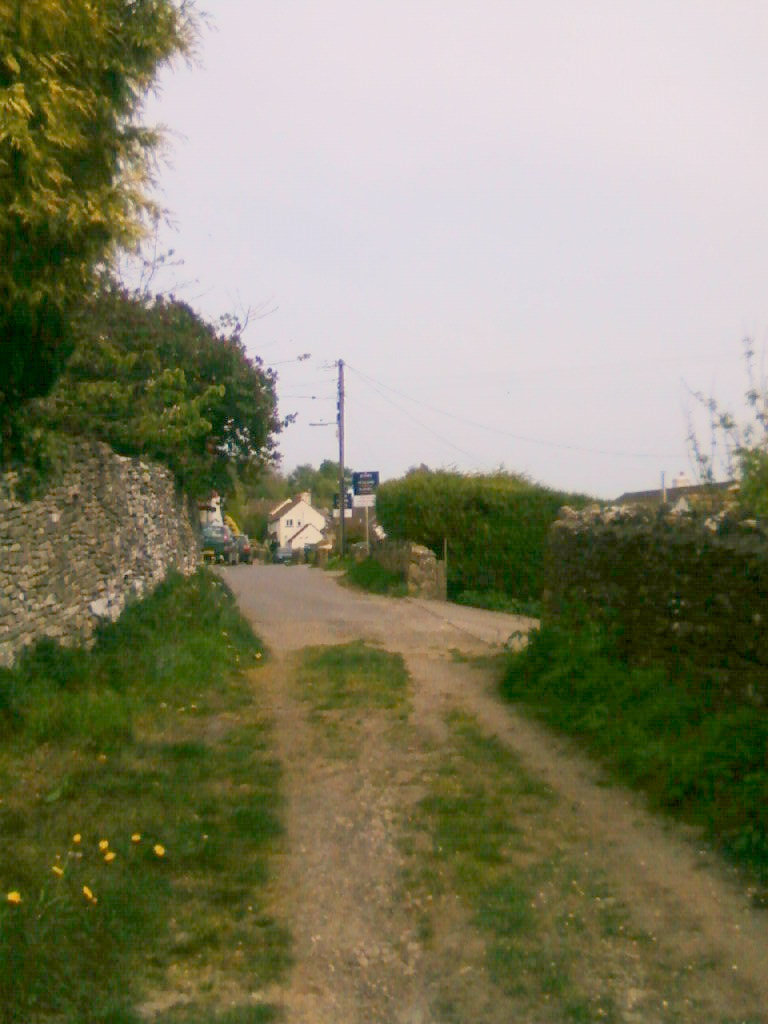
West Horrington from Hill End
