= Tone Vale Hospital =

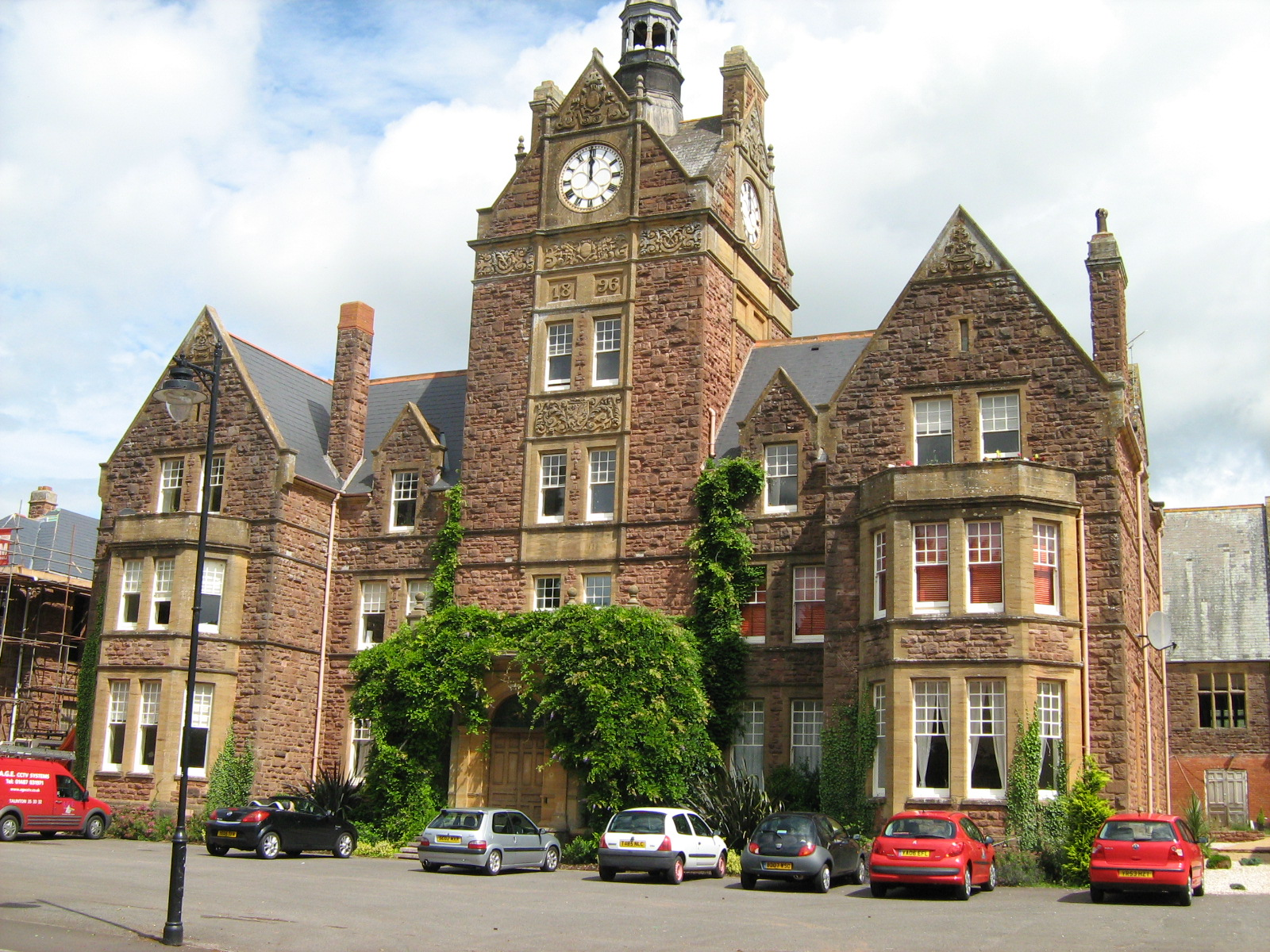
- The main hospital building

- Shown in Somerset

Geography
- Location: Cotford St Luke, Somerset, England, United Kingdom
- Coordinates: 51.0392°N 3.1886°W

Organisation
- Care system: Public NHS
- Type: Psychiatric

History
- Founded: 1892
- Closed: 1995

Links
- Lists: Hospitals in England

Tone Vale Hospital was a psychiatric hospital located approximately 3 kilometres (1.9 mi) to the north west of Norton Fitzwarren, near Taunton, Somerset, England, in what is now the village of Cotford St Luke. It covered a large catchment area, with patients originating from places as far apart as Porlock (on the north western edge of Somerset) and Yeovil (on the south eastern edge).

== History ==
Tone Vale was founded as the second Somerset County Asylum in 1892, the first Somerset County Asylum near Wells having become overcrowded. The competition to design the asylum was won by the architects Giles, Gough and Trollope, and the first patient was admitted in May 1897. At that time the hospital was known as the Somerset and Bath Asylum, Cotford. In 1986, under Margaret Thatcher's government, the Audit Commission published a report Making a Reality of Community Care, which proposed the policy that became Care in the Community and led to a number of mental hospitals being closed in the United Kingdom. In 1987, Tone Vale had 504 inpatients. In 1992, the number had reduced to 350, and in March 1994 to 117. The hospital closed in March 1995.

== Notable people associated with Tone Vale ==
The hospital's first medical superintendent was Dr Henry Aveline, son of the Somerset County geologist.

James Stutt, an electrical engineer, worked at Tone Vale from 1931 to 1977, and devised an electroconvulsive therapy (ECT) machine with a control on it similar to the dial on a telephone.

In the 1940s, Dr John Walsh was one of the few psychiatrists in the UK to experiment with transorbital leucotomy, a form of leucotomy in which the brain was approached through the eye sockets, rather than through holes drilled in the skull. In 1949 he operated on eight women at Tone Vale using electroconvulsive shock as anaesthetic on three of them.

Somerset and England cricketer Harold Gimblett was admitted to Tone Vale with depression in 1953; he was treated with ECT.

== Associated institution ==
Following the arrival of psychiatrist Dr M F Bethell in the 1950s, Tone Vale and the Somerset Educational Authority cooperated in establishing Merrifield Children's Unit in the hospital's grounds. Under the control of Dr Bethell and his chief nurse Donald Mackey, the unit allowed children and adolescents to be treated without the need to place them on a ward in the main hospital building.

== In literature ==
Tone Vale Hospital is celebrated in the book The Tone Vale Story: A Century of Care, edited by David Hinton and Fred Clarke. A less favourable view of the institution is given by Joyce Passmore in her memoir The Light in My Mind. Margaret Sparshott's poem 'Tone Vale Hospital' is included in her published anthology A Matter of Identity.

== Current status ==
Many of the Tone Vale Hospital buildings have been demolished, but some have been preserved and incorporated into the new village of Cotford St Luke, which has developed since the late 1990s. The hospital chapel — the Church of Saint Luke — is a Grade II listed building.

== See also ==
- Healthcare in Somerset
