= St Paul's Church, Easton =

Church in Somerset, England

St Paul's Church
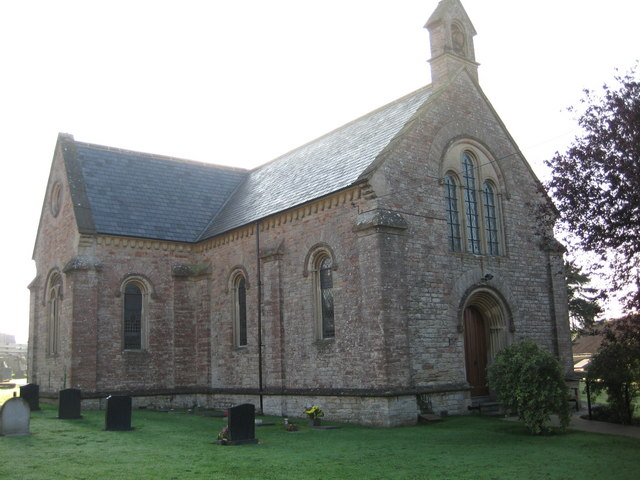
- St Paul's Church

Religion
- Affiliation: Church of England
- Ecclesiastical or organisational status: Active
- Year consecrated: 1844

Location
- Location: Easton, Somerset, England
- Interactive map of St Paul's Church
- Coordinates: 51.2256°N 2.6981°W

Architecture
- Architect: Richard Carver
- Type: Church
- Completed: 1843

St Paul's Church is a Church of England church in Easton, Somerset, England. The church, which was designed by Richard Carver and built in 1843, has been a Grade II listed building since 1987.

== History ==
St Paul's was erected in 1843 as a chapel of ease in the parish of St Cuthbert Out through the efforts of the vicar, Rev. H. W. Barnard. The church was consecrated by the Bishop of Salisbury, Rev. Edward Denison, on 4 February 1844, with assistance from the Archdeacon of Bath, Rev. William Brymer, the Canon of Salisbury, Rev. W. Hamilton, and the Chancellor of the Diocese of Bath and Wells, Rev. W. Towry Law.

The church's centenary was celebrated in February 1944 with a visit by the Bishop of Salisbury, Rev. Neville Lovett. Addresses were given by the Bishop and Rev. J. W. C. Wand, while a talk on the church's history was given by Rev. P. S. Thomas.

== Architecture ==
St Paul's is built of coursed and squared rubble, with a slate roof and bellcote, in a Neo-Norman style. The inside is made up of a two-bay nave, transepts and chancel with a vestry.
