= St Andrew's Church, Clifton =

Ruined Church in Clifton, Bristol

Coordinates: 51.4538°N 2.6145°W

Church of St Andrew
- Church of St Andrew, Clifton
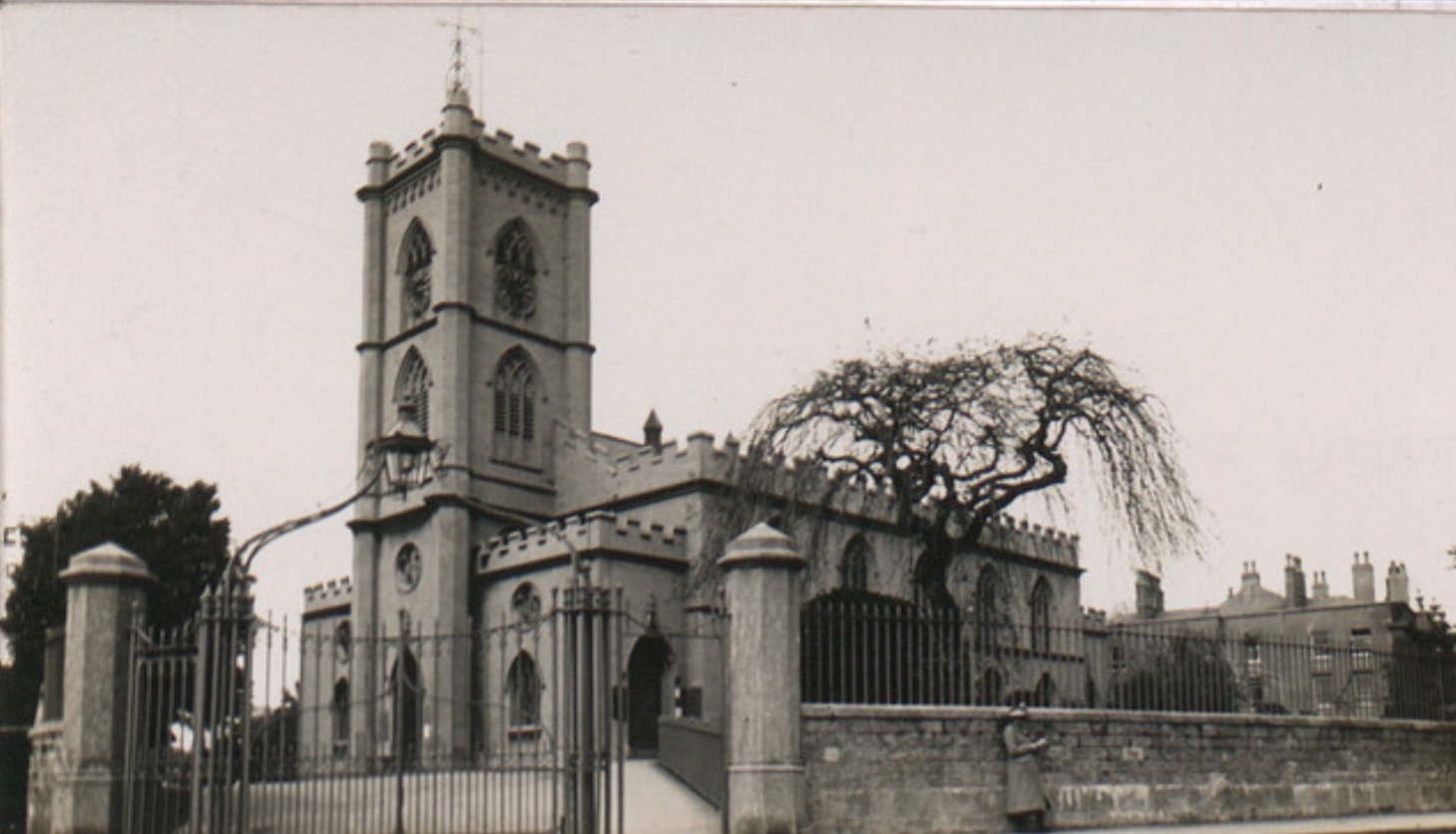
- St Andrew's Church before its destruction
- Church of St Andrew
- Location: Clifton, Bristol
- Country: England
- Denomination: Anglican

History
- Founded: 1154
- Founder: William de Clifton
- Dedicated: 1154

Architecture
- Architect: James Foster
- Style: Gothic
- Years built: c. 1150–1154; c. 1654; 1819–1822
- Demolished: 1940 (Church), 1956 (Bell tower)

Administration
- Diocese: Diocese of Bristol

The Church of St Andrew was an Anglican church located in Clifton, Bristol, destroyed in 1940 during the Bristol Blitz. As of today, the church’s foundations remain, along with part of its adjacent cemetery, now called the Birdcage Walk. The church was constructed between 1819 and 1822, replacing a previous structure, and was designed by James Foster.

== History ==
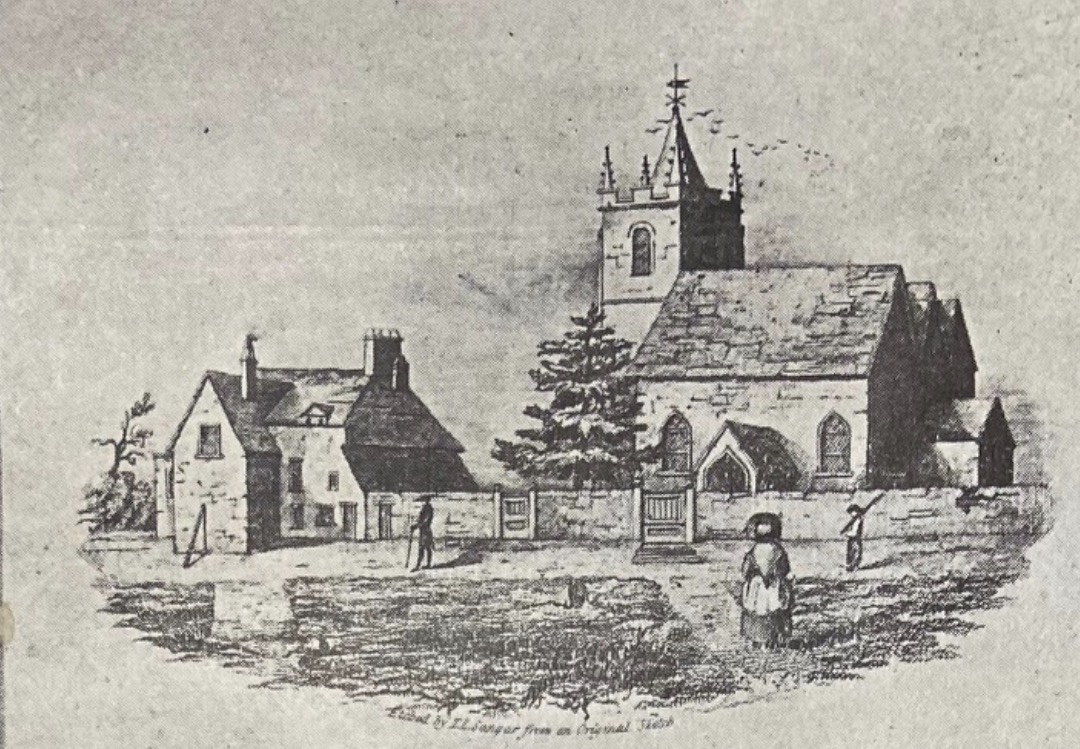
The original church, before its reconstruction in 1654

The church was first mentioned in a document dated 1154, when William de Clifton gave the church’s patronage to the Abbey of St. Augustine. It quickly became the parish church of Clifton. In 1645, following the Siege of Bristol, the church had fallen in a state of considerable decay and was partially destroyed during the siege. In 1654, plans were approved to reconstruct the church. By the beginning of the 18th century, the population of Clifton had increased and it was deemed necessary to expand the church. In 1716 a North Aisle was added, followed by a South Aisle in 1768. In 1739, John Wesley preached in the church, commenting that the church’s congregation consisted of ‘Many Rich’.

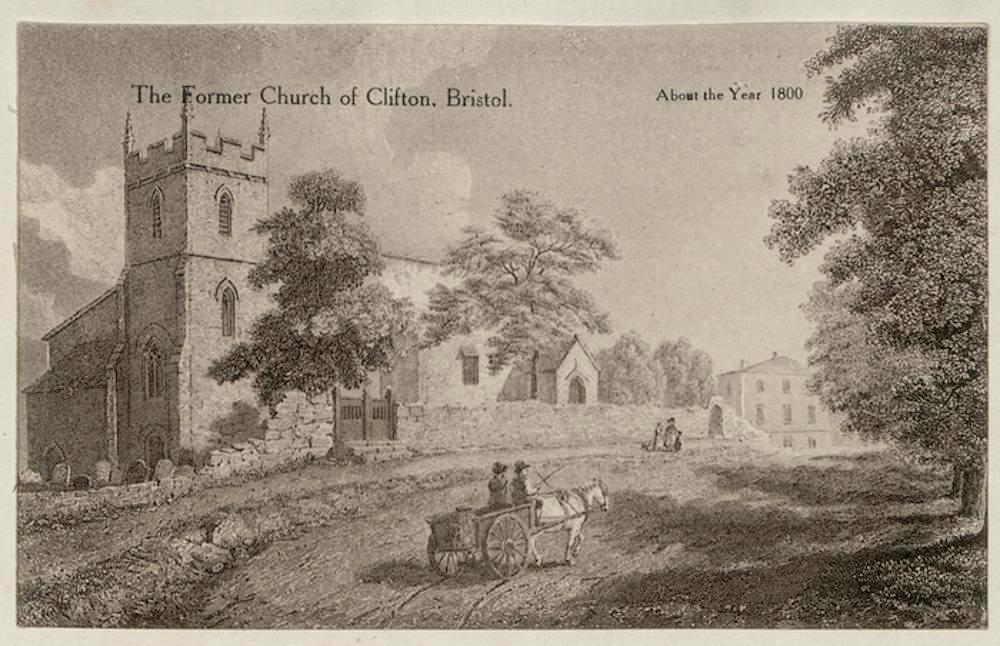
The second church, before its reconstruction in 1819

By the 19th century, a larger church was needed, and thus in 1819 construction of the new church began, designed by James Foster, with its construction concluding in 1822. It was consecrated on 12 August 1822. The new church was built adjacent to the previous structure, which was demolished after 1822. Built in a gothic style, it could accommodate 1,600 congregants and cost roughly £18,000 to build, with the money raised by Clifton’s wealthy residents.

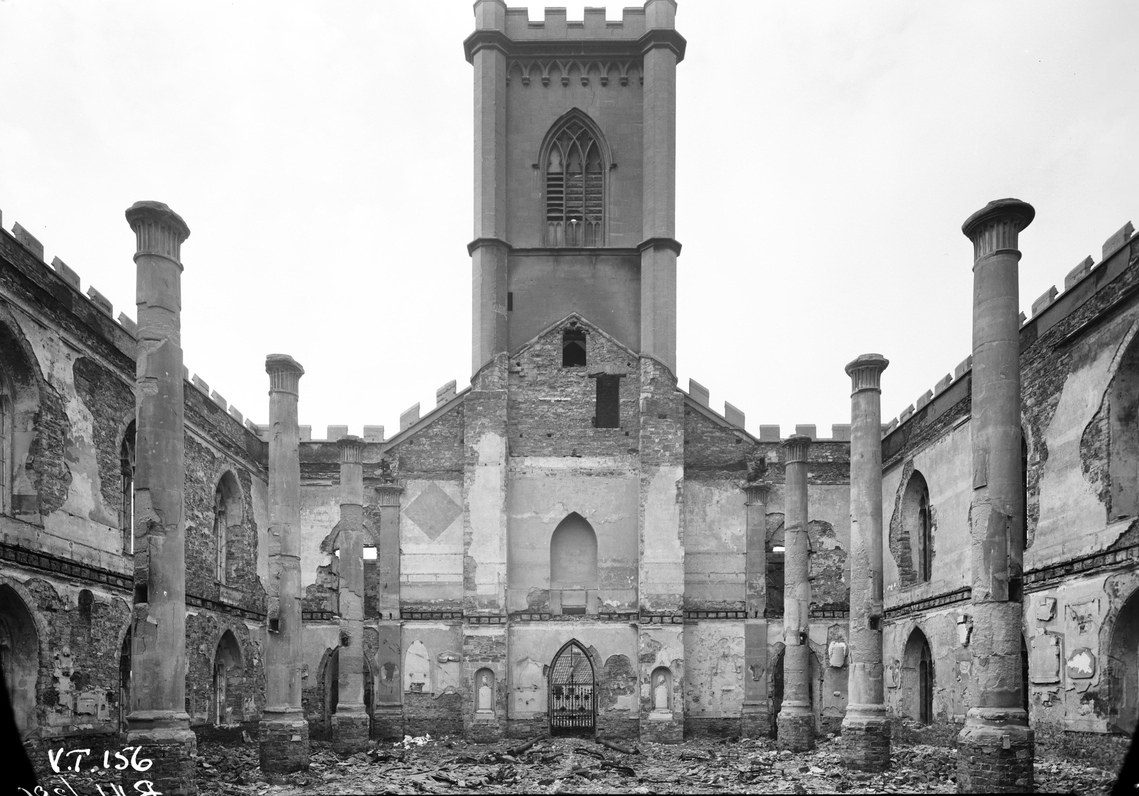
The church’s interior following the aftermath of the blitz

On 24 November 1940, during evening service on Sunday, the church was hit by numerous bombs fired during the Bristol Blitz, striking the roof and setting it ablaze. At the time of the strike, roughly 200 people were present in the church. The church’s Canon, Henry Bothamley, led the congregation to the crypt, and subsequently helped them evacuate the church just before the roof collapsed, destroying the building. Only the bell tower remained intact. After the war petitions tried to preserve the remains of the structure and its bell tower, but in the 1950s they were deemed unsafe and in 1956 the church was demolished. Following its destruction and demolition, the nearby Christ Church, became the parish church of Clifton.

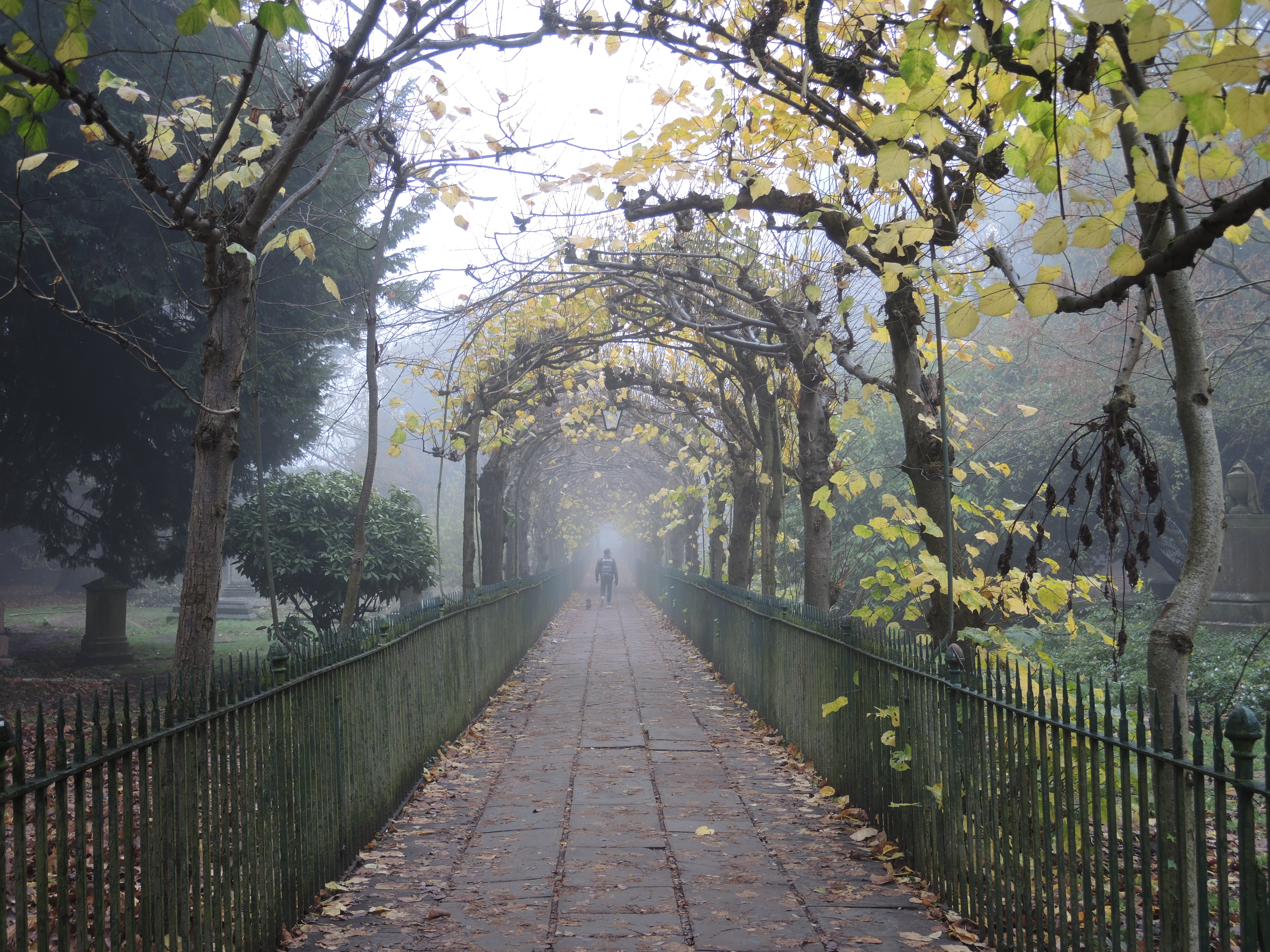
The birdcage walk

As of today, all that remains of the original church are its foundations and graveyard, adjacent to the ruins of the church.

== Architecture ==
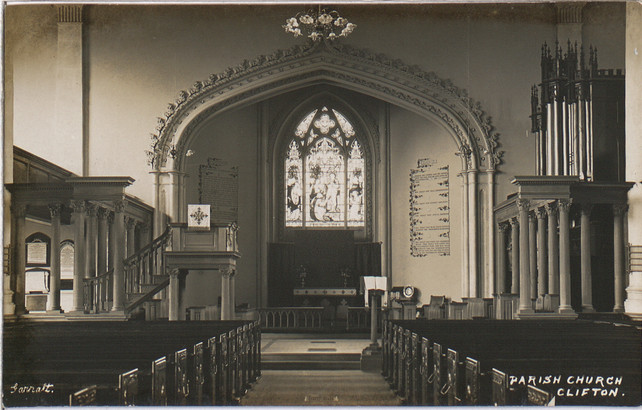
The interior of the church

The original 12th century church was a small and modest Norman structure, featuring a small nave, which was sufficient to serve the small population of Clifton. Following its partial destruction in 1645, the church was expanded and was built in a much more Puritan style. In 1819, James Foster designed the church in a Gothic style. It featured a large nave and a crypt. The interior was built in a rectangular shape to accommodate as many worshipers as possible. The bell tower was rectangular and was located above the entrance.

== Records ==
Most of the surviving records that relate to the church are in Bristol Archives. Some of these were transcribed, edited and published in the late 20th-century, before being digitised and electronically published by the Bristol Record Society in 2026.

Campbell, Mary V. (ed.), Memorials of the Church and Churchyard of St. Andrews, Clifton, Vol. 1 (Bristol, 1987)

Campbell, Mary V. (ed.), Memorials of the Church and Churchyard of St. Andrews, Clifton, Vol. 2 (Bristol, 1987)

Campbell, Mary V. (ed.), The Register of the Church of St. Andrew, Clifton (Baptisms, burials and marriages 1538-1681) (Bristol Record Society, 1987)

Campbell, Mary V. (ed.), The Registers of the Church of St. Andrew, Clifton: Part 1 – Baptisms, burials 1722-1760 and marriages 1722-1763. Part 2 – Marriages 1724-1766 (Bristol, 1989)

Campbell, Mary V. (ed.), The Registers of the Church of St. Andrew, Clifton: Marriages 1767-1812, Baptisms and Burials 1761-1812 (Bristol, 1990)

Campbell, Mary V. (ed.), The 1851 Census of Clifton, Bristol, Vol. 1 (Bristol, 1992)

Campbell, Mary V. (ed.), The 1851 Census of Clifton, Bristol, Vol. 2 (Bristol, 1992)

Campbell, Mary V. (ed.), The Registers of the Church of St. Andrew, Clifton: Part 1 Baptisms 1813-1837 (Bristol, 1994)

Campbell, Mary V. (ed.), The Registers of the Church of St. Andrew, Clifton: Part 2 Burials and Marriages 1813-1837 (Bristol, 1994)
