= Richard Carver (architect) =

English architect

Richard Carver (1792–1862) was a prolific architect of churches and secular buildings in Somerset, England, first based in his home town of Bridgwater and from 1828 in Taunton. Possibly a pupil of Sir Jeffry Wyatville, he held the post of county surveyor, from which he retired in 1857 and died at Wilton, now part of Taunton, on 1 September 1862.

== Known buildings and restoration works ==
- The Old Schoolhouse, Yarde. A school room and teacher's house dating from 1819. for Sir John Trevelyan of Nettlecombe Court.
- Church of St Philip and St James, Burtle, 1838–9.
- Christ Church, Coxley, 1838–9.
- St John's Church, East Horrington, 1838.
- St Peter and St Paul, Over Stowey. Restoration.
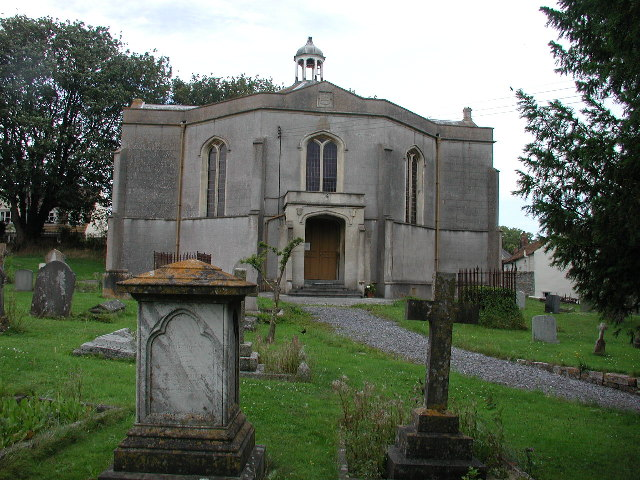
- Holy Trinity Blackford
  Holy Trinity Church, Blackford, 1823.
- Cannington: The Blessed Virgin Mary. Church repaired and altered in 1840.
- Fitzhead: St James. Rebuilt 1849 from old materials.
- Nether Stowey: The Blessed Virgin Mary .1852–1857 Church rebuilt and enlarged.
- Stogursey: St Andrew. 1824 Restoration of the nave.
- Fairfield House. Alterations, 1815.
- HM Prison Shepton Mallet in the 1830s and 1840s.
- Christ Church, Theale. Datestone of 1826.
- Church of St Michael, Burrowbridge, 1836–8.
- Maunsell House, North Petherton, additions and alterations 1827–8.
- The Guildhall, Chard, 1835
- Church of the Holy Trinity, Taunton, 1842.
- Church of St Philip and St James, Burtle, 1838–9.
- Church of St James, Chedington, Dorset, 1840–1.
- Church of St Paul, Easton, Somerset, 1843.
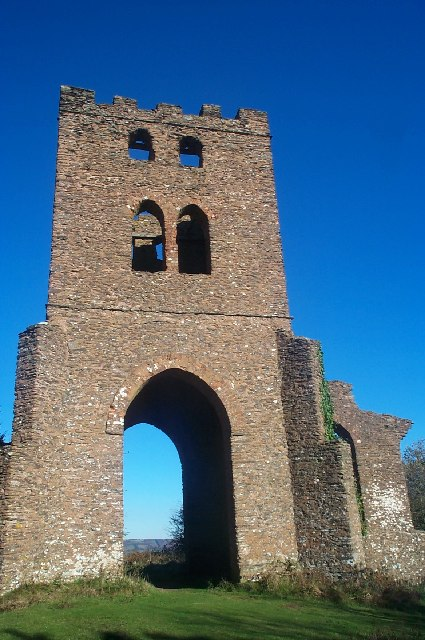
- Willett Tower
  Willett House, Elworthy, circa 1816 and presumed design and construction of Willett Tower.
