= Stowell Meadow =

Protected area in Somerset, England

- Site of Special Scientific Interest
- Location within Somerset
- Location of Stowell Meadow.
- Area of search: Somerset
- Grid reference: ST333062
- Coordinates: 50.85145°N 2.94888°W
- Interest: Biological
- Area: 2.8 hectares (0.028 km^{2}; 0.011 sq mi)
- Notification date: 1987

Stowell Meadow (grid reference ST333062) is a 2.8 hectare (6.9 acre) biological Site of Special Scientific Interest near Tatworth in Somerset, notified in 1987.

Stowell Meadow supports a nationally rare type of traditionally managed wet neutral grassland. Alder woodland and plant communities typical of marshy grassland are also present. 90 species of plant have been recorded to date, several of which have a local distribution in Somerset. A number of nationally scarce species of beetle have already been recorded.
