= Maesbury Railway Cutting =

Railway cutting in Somerset, England

- Site of Special Scientific Interest
- Location within Somerset
- Location of Maesbury Railway Cutting.
- Area of search: Somerset
- Grid reference: ST606475
- Coordinates: 51.22532°N 2.56560°W
- Interest: Geological
- Area: 2 hectares (0.020 km^{2}; 0.0077 sq mi)
- Notification date: 1995

Maesbury Railway Cutting (grid reference ST606475) is a 2 hectare geological Site of Special Scientific Interest between East Horrington and Gurney Slade in Somerset, notified in 1995.

It was part of the Somerset and Dorset Joint Railway.

This is a Geological Conservation Review site because it exposes approximately 135 metres of strata representing the middle and upper Lower Limestone Shales and the basal Black Rock Limestone. Both formations are of early Carboniferous (Courceyan) age.

It lies close to the Iron Age hill fort Maesbury Castle.

== Sources ==
- English Nature citation sheet for the site (accessed 10 August 2006)
