= Wells St Cuthbert In =

Former civil parish in Somerset, England

Coordinates: 51.208°N 2.65°W

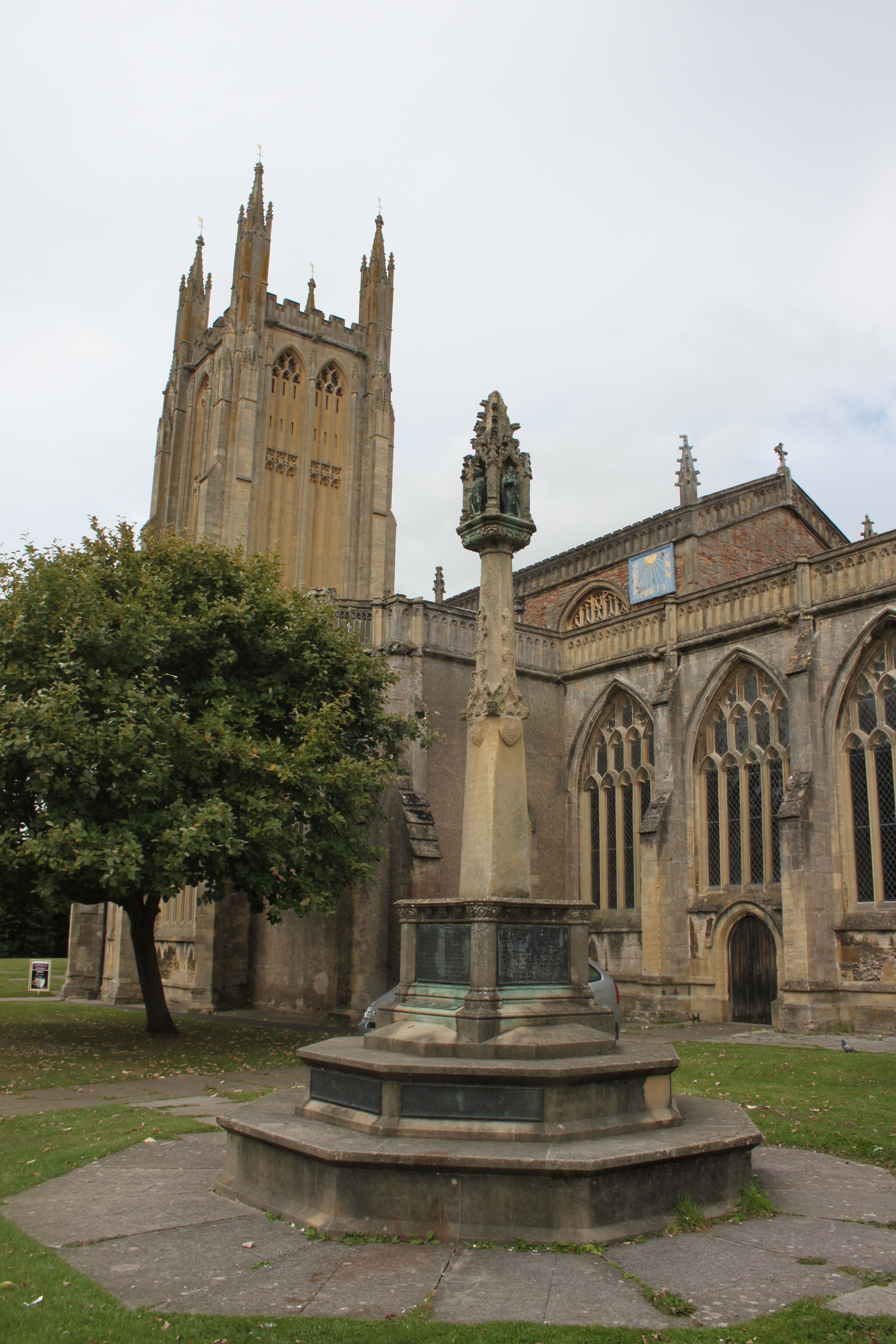
- The church of St Cuthbert, in Wells

- Location within Somerset
- Civil parish: Wells
- Unitary authority: Somerset
- Ceremonial county: Somerset
- Region: South West
- Country: England
- Sovereign state: United Kingdom
- Police: Avon and Somerset
- Fire: Devon and Somerset
- Ambulance: South Western

Wells St Cuthbert In, sometimes St Cuthbert In, is a former civil parish covering the larger part of the small city of Wells, now in the parish of Wells, in Somerset, England.

The parish was named for the Church of St Cuthbert, Wells and was created in 1866. The historic ecclesiastical parish of Wells St Cuthbert had been split into two, with the Wells St Cuthbert Out parish covering the area outside the city of Wells.

On 1 April 1933 the civil parish was merged with Wells St Andrew (the historic liberty of the cathedral and the bishop's palace, amounting to just 52 acres (21 ha)) to form the present-day parish of Wells, which covers all of the city. In 1931 the parish had a population of 4541.

The civil parish of St Cuthbert Out continues to exist (though now often without "Wells" in its name) and entirely surrounds the 1933-created parish of Wells.
