= Cotford St Luke =

Village and civil parish in Somerset

Coordinates: 51.0392°N 3.1886°W

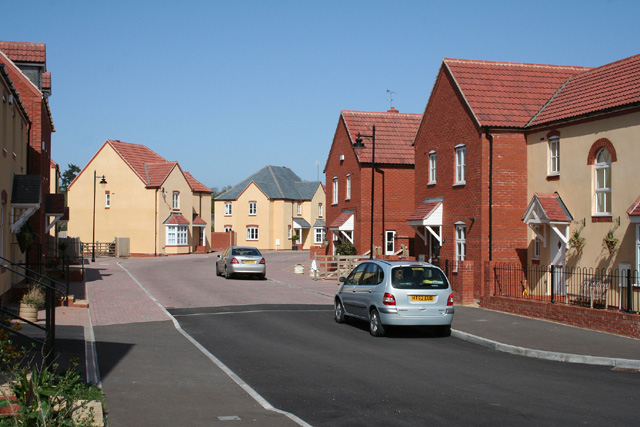

- Location within Somerset
- Population: 2,642 (2021)
- OS grid reference: ST167273
- Civil parish: Cotford St Luke
- Unitary authority: Somerset Council
- Ceremonial county: Somerset
- Region: South West
- Country: England
- Sovereign state: United Kingdom
- Post town: Taunton
- Postcode district: TA4
- Dialling code: 01823
- Police: Avon and Somerset
- Fire: Devon and Somerset
- Ambulance: South Western
- UK Parliament: Tiverton and Minehead

Cotford St Luke (Note: alternatively written Cotford St. Luke (the word Saint is spoken with either abbreviation), including all postal addresses in the village) (/ˈkɔːtfərd/) is a village and civil parish in Somerset, England. It is located approximately 2 miles (3.2 km) northwest of Norton Fitzwarren and 1.5 miles (2.4 km) south of Bishops Lydeard. The population recorded by the 2021 census is 2,642.

The village was established following the closure of Tone Vale Hospital and Cotford Asylum in the 1990s. The old asylum buildings were either demolished or converted into housing commencing in the late 1990s.

== Civil parish ==
In 2011 the civil parish of Cotford St Luke was created; previously the village was part of Bishop's Lydeard civil parish – the new parish was formed entirely out of that parish. On 5 May 2011, Cotford St Luke Parish Council was first elected; seven parish councillors were elected un-opposed. In 2024, a series of resignations left the parish council without any members or a clerk.

The civil parish is 8.25 square kilometres (3.19 sq mi) in area.

== Amenities and landmarks ==
The former hospital chapel – which was dedicated to Saint Luke – is a Grade II listed building built in the 1890s, and is located in the centre of the village. It has been converted into a public house/restaurant, called 'The Chapel', which opened on 13 July 2008 after being derelict for 18 years.

The village has a Southern Co-operative convenience store located near the centre, as well as a community centre/village hall which is situated next to the primary school in the south of the village, where there is also a village green and sports facilities.

== Education ==
Cotford St Luke Primary School is situated on the southern edge of the village. It was built on what were the grounds of the asylum playing fields and opened in September 2003. The school has 10 classes and caters for children from 4 to 11 years, with a pre-school on site for children from the age of 3 years.

The catchment area secondary school is Kingsmead School in Wiveliscombe. The school provides a free bus service for children in its catchment areas including Cotford St Luke.

The 2021 census recorded 27.4% of the population as being under 18.

== Health ==
Dene Barton Community Hospital is a modern hospital located on the eastern side of the village, and has 40 beds for elderly patients needing acute care or rehabilitation. It is operated by the Somerset NHS Foundation Trust and the Somerset Neurological Rehabilitation Centre is located there.

== Religion ==
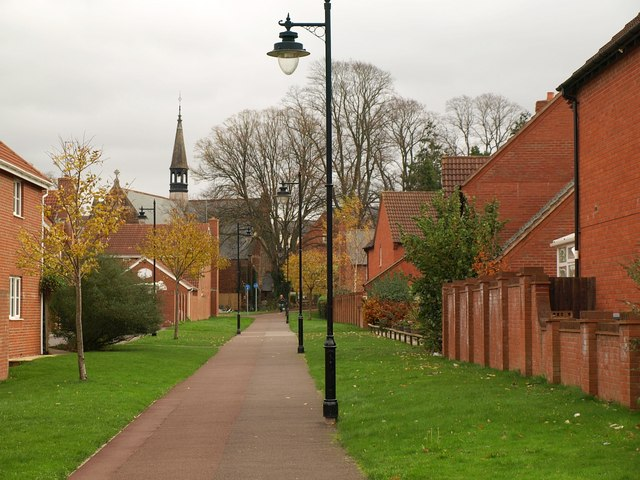
Path running through the village, with the Chapel pub in the distance.

St Luke's Centre has been constructed near St Luke's chapel, and was opened by the Bishop of Bath and Wells on 21 October 2019, to serve as a parish centre of worship and a community hub for the village. Like the old hospital chapel, it is dedicated to Luke the Evangelist. The village forms part of the ecclesiastical parish of 'Heathfield with Cotford St. Luke', with the Church of St John the Baptist in Heathfield serving as the parish church.

The 2021 census recorded 43.9% of the population as being Christians.

== Public transport ==
Cotford St Luke is served by the 25 (Taunton – Wiveliscombe – Dulverton), the 25A (Taunton - Cotford St Luke) and 28A (Taunton – Watchet – Minehead) scheduled bus services, provided by The Buses of Somerset.

The nearest railway station is Bishops Lydeard, which is on the West Somerset Railway, a heritage line. The nearest mainline station is Taunton.
