= Holy Trinity Church, Kingswood =

Church in South Gloucestershire, England

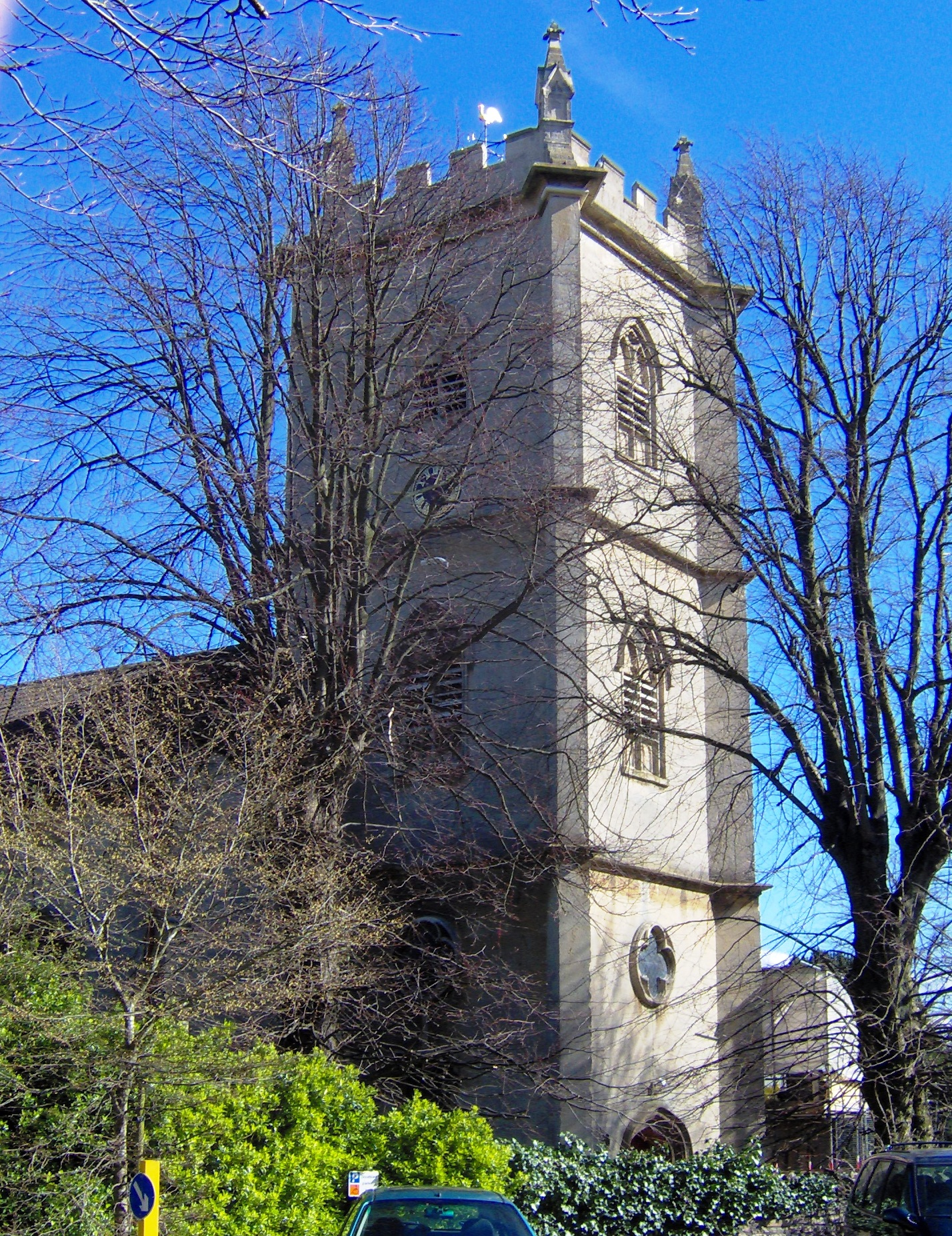

- Location within Gloucestershire

Religion
- Affiliation: Church of England
- District: Kingswood

Location
- Location: South Gloucestershire, England
- Interactive map of Holy Trinity Church, Kingswood
- Coordinates: 51.4612°N 2.5037°W

Architecture
- Architect: James Foster
- Completed: 1821

Holy Trinity Church, Kingswood (grid reference ST651737), is an Anglican parish church in Kingswood, South Gloucestershire, England. It has been designated as a grade II* listed building.

== History ==
Until the early 19th century Kingswood had no church of its own, and was served by the ancient parish of Bitton four miles away. A church was considered an urgent requirement by Anglicans, as the area was a hot-bed of Nonconformity with the Wesleyan, Whitfield Tabernacle and Moravian churches already in operation. The church was built within sight of all three and was given a tower so that it became more prominent than its neighbours.

It was one of the first churches built from funds voted by Parliament to mark Napoleon's defeat at Waterloo, and hence known as a "Waterloo Church". The foundation stone was laid by the Bishop of Gloucester on 9 June 1819, but there followed a dispute over the title of the site which meant that building did not begin in earnest until 1820. The completed church was consecrated on 11 September 1821. The architect was James Foster.

The church was damaged by fire in 1852 and the panelled ceiling in the nave was never replaced. The present chancel was added 1897–1900. It contains a Sweetland Organ built in 1903. There are two bells in the tower however these are no longer ringable.

The churchyard contains war graves of eight service personnel of World War I and seven of World War II.

The parish and benefice of Kingswood is within the Diocese of Bristol.

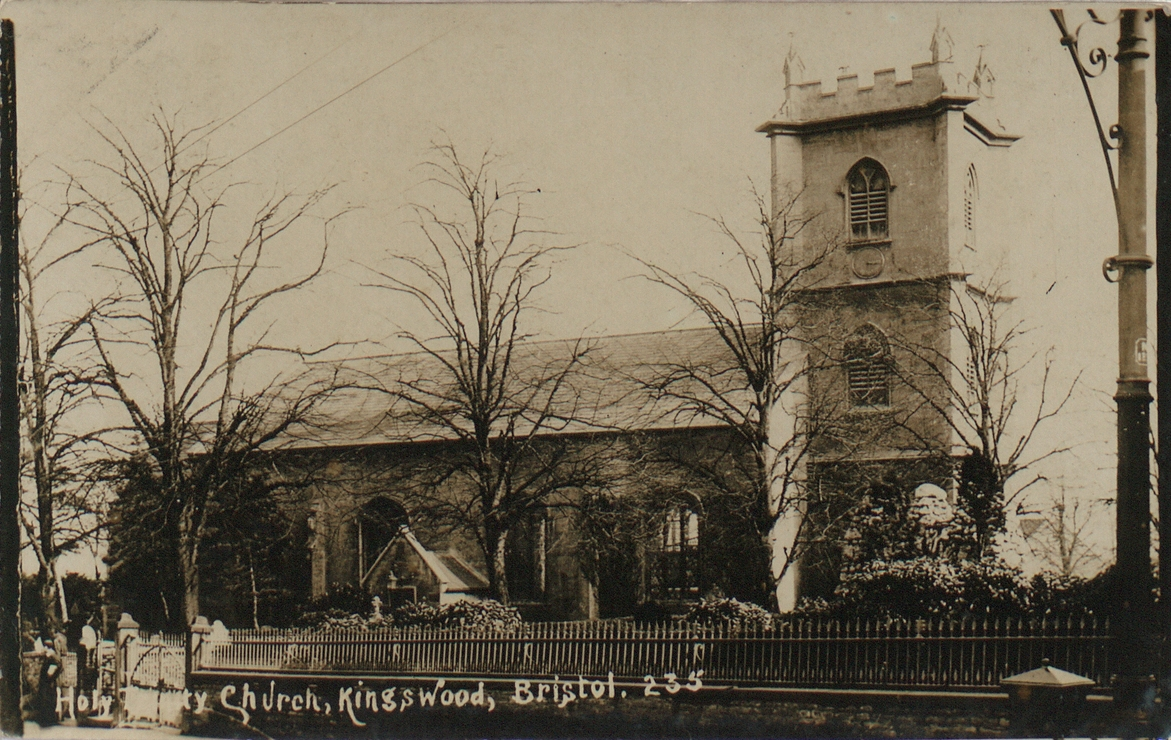
Black and white photograph postcard from 1919 showing the church, Holy Trinity Church, Kingswood, Bristol, UK. The image shows the North aspect of the church with trees in the churchyard and the brickwalls and iron railings around the graveyard.

== Archives ==
Parish records for Holy Trinity church, Kingswood are held at Bristol Archives (Ref. P.K) (online catalogue) including baptism, marriage and burial registers. The archive also includes records of the incumbent, churchwardens and parochial church council.

== See also ==
- Churches in Bristol
- Grade II* listed buildings in Bristol
