= Mendip Hospital =

Former hospital in Somerset, England

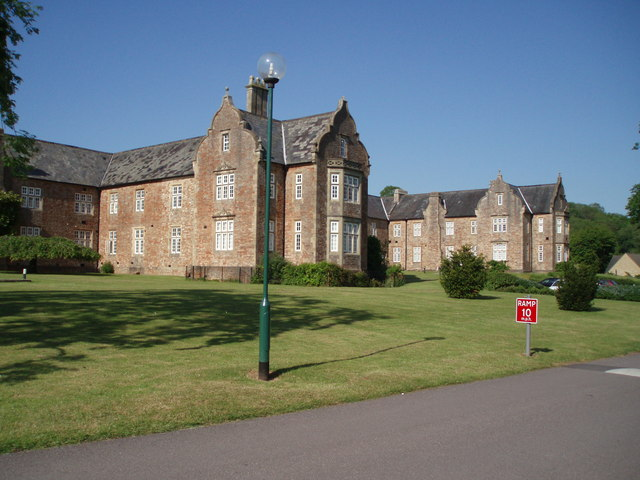

- Location within Somerset
- 51.2155°N 2.6157°W
- Location: Horrington, Somerset, England

History
- Built: 1848

Site notes
- Architect(s): George Gilbert Scott and William Bonython Moffatt

Listed Building – Grade II
- Official name: Mendip Hospital Main Building
- Designated: 19 December 1990
- Reference no.: 1345148

Listed Building – Grade II
- Official name: Chapel with Covered Approach to Mendip Hospital
- Designated: 19 December 1990
- Reference no.: 1058586

Listed Building – Grade II
- Official name: South Lodge to Mendip Hospital
- Designated: 19 December 1990
- Reference no.: 1058587

Mendip Hospital opened in 1848 as the Somerset and Bath Pauper Lunatic Asylum at Horrington, near Wells, in the English county of Somerset.

As a county asylum, it was replaced by Tone Vale Hospital in 1897, but it continued to house long-stay elderly and mentally infirm patients. It finally closed in 1991, when the buildings were converted into houses and apartments.

== History ==
The hospital was established as a county asylum for pauper lunatics, under the County Asylums Act 1808, following campaigns by Sir Edwin Chadwick and the work of the Poor Law Commission and opened in 1848. The buildings were designed by George Gilbert Scott and William Bonython Moffatt. It was built at a cost of £38,000 by Kirk of Sleaford. The first patients were brought to the hospital from local workhouses. Some of the male patients tended the hospital's own farm which provided food for the institution. During the 1850s, within a few years of opening, the hospital was nearing its capacity of 350 and new dining and recreation halls were built. In 1867 the attics were made into dormitories. In the 1870s land adjacent to the hospital was bought to establish a cemetery which was used for the patients who died until 1963 during which time 2,900 burials were carried out. A further villa capable of holding 100 patients was added in 1882. In the 1920s electricity was installed which was followed by a cinema in the 1930s.

The function as an asylum was taken over by Tone Vale Hospital in 1897, after which Mendip Hospital provided services for long-stay elderly and mentally infirm patients. It closed in 1991 and the building was converted into houses and flats.

== Architecture ==
The main two-storey building, with attics, has a frontage in an "E" shape which is 280 metres (920 ft) long. The roofs are covered in slate and have ogee-shaped gables and finials, with stone chimney stacks. The stone chapel, which is joined to the main building by a covered walkway, is supported by two-stage buttresses and has a spire on the crossing tower. There is also a lodge at the entrance to the site.
