= Tatworth =

Village in Somerset, England

Coordinates: 50.8450°N 2.9601°W

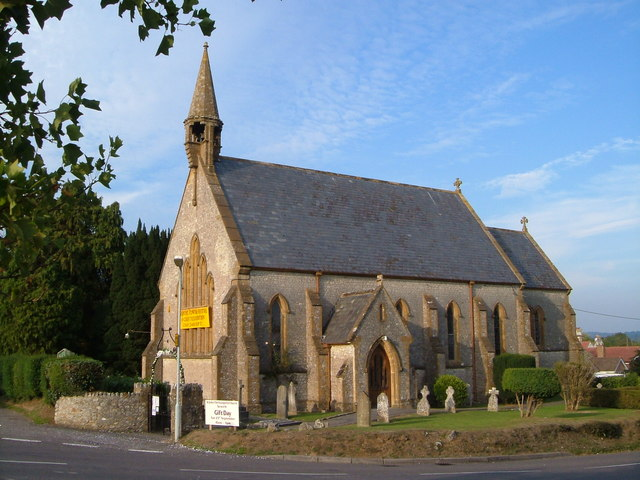
- St John's Church

- Location within Somerset
- Population: 2,737 (Tatworth and Forton Parish, 2021)
- OS grid reference: ST325055
- Civil parish: Tatworth and Forton
- Unitary authority: Somerset Council
- Ceremonial county: Somerset
- Region: South West
- Country: England
- Sovereign state: United Kingdom
- Post town: CHARD
- Postcode district: TA20
- Dialling code: 01460
- Police: Avon and Somerset
- Fire: Devon and Somerset
- Ambulance: South Western
- UK Parliament: Yeovil

Tatworth is a village 2 miles (3 km) south of Chard in the county of Somerset, England. It is within the civil parish of Tatworth and Forton. At the 2021 census, the parish had a population of 2,737.

Tatworth is a large village, consisting of a number of smaller villages including South Chard, Perry Street and Chard Junction which are close together. The hamlet of Forton lies to the north, towards Chard; an area southwest of Forton is called White Gate.

== History ==
A white lias limestone Roman tessera measuring 25.7 millimetres (1.01 in) x 20.18 millimetres (0.79 in) x 17.75 millimetres (0.70 in) and regularly cut on two faces was found in the area, and may be connected with the remains of a Roman villa or farmhouse by St Margaret's Lane. Part of this building was excavated in 1967 and pottery and paving found there are displayed in the Chard Museum.

The name of the village comes from the Old English tat and worp meaning 'A cheerful farm'. In 1254, the spelling was Tattewurthe and was a sub-manor of Chard. In 1554 Thatteworh was granted to William Petre as the 'manor and park of Tatworthy' and remained in the family until 1790. Tatworth in the 1850s extended to 1,552 acres (6.28 km^{2}) and had a population of 852.

== Governance ==
There are two tiers of local government covering Tatworth and Forton, at parish and unitary authority level: Tatworth and Forton Parish Council and Somerset Council. The parish council is based at Tatworth Memorial Hall on Kents Road.

For national elections, the parish forms part of the Yeovil constituency.

=== Administrative history ===
The Tatworth and Forton area was historically part of the ancient parish of Chard. From the 17th century onwards, parishes were gradually given various civil functions under the poor laws, in addition to their original ecclesiastical functions. In some cases, including Chard, the civil functions were exercised by subdivisions of the parish rather than the parish as a whole. In Chard, poor law functions were exercised separately for the area of the borough of Chard and the rest of the parish. In 1866, the legal definition of 'parish' was changed to be the areas used for administering the poor laws, and so the old parish was split into two civil parishes: 'Chard Borough' and 'Chard', the latter covering the rural parts of the old parish outside the borough. The rural Chard parish ceded territory to the borough in 1893 and 1933.

The rural Chard parish was part of the wider Chard Rural District between 1894 and 1974. In 1974, Chard Rural District was abolished, and the parish became part of the new district of Yeovil, which was renamed South Somerset in 1985. Also in 1985, the rural Chard parish was renamed 'Tatworth and Forton', and there were some changes to the parish boundary.

South Somerset was abolished in 2023. Somerset County Council then took over district-level functions across its area, making it a unitary authority, and was renamed Somerset Council.

== Amenities ==
St John's Church, which dates from 1851, is designated by English Heritage as a Grade II listed building.

Tatworth has a primary school, two pubs – Ye Olde Poppe Inn and the Golden Fleece – and the Perry Street Club, a members-only club. It also has a McColl's shop which is also a post office.

Perry Street F.C. in action in the 2008-09 season

Tatworth has a number of local sports clubs. The Perry Street & District Football League was formed in Tatworth in 1903 by Charles Edward Small, the owner of the Perry Street Lace Works. Perry Street Football Club still play in the league today. There is also a cricket club and local skittles league based at Perry Street Club.

Stowell Meadow is a biological Site of Special Scientific Interest.
