= James Foster (architect) =

British architect

- Born: c.1748
- Died: 1823
- Occupation: Architect

James Foster (c.1748 – 1823) was an English mason and architect in Bristol.

He was initially a pupil and apprentice of Thomas Paty, working both as a stonemason and an architect but from about 1800 his practice became entirely architectural. He was later joined by his son James (d.1836), another son Thomas, a partner William Ignatius Okely and grandson John.

== List of works of Foster and partners ==
=== James Foster or James Foster and son(s) ===
- Abergwili Palace, Carmarthen (1803)
- St James's Church, Mangotsfield (1812) alterations
- Brislington Church (1819) added north aisle
- Holy Trinity Church, Kingswood, Bristol (1819–1821)
- St Andrew's Church, Clifton, Bristol (1819–1822)
- Stapleton Church (1820)
- Meridian Place, Bristol (1822)
- City Market, St Nicholas Street, Bristol (1823)
- Upper and Lower Arcades, Bristol (1824)
- Former Anglican chapel in Shirehampton, burnt down in 1928 and replaced by present church (1827)
