= Church of St John the Evangelist, Tatworth =

Church in Somerset, England

Church of St John the Evangelist
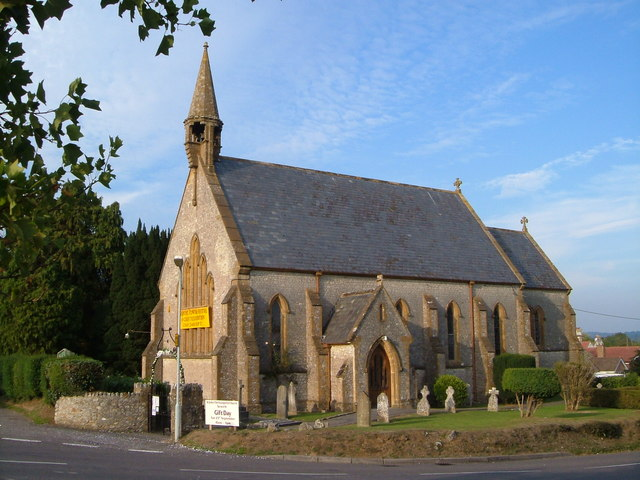

Religion
- Affiliation: Church of England
- Ecclesiastical or organizational status: Active
- Year consecrated: 1851

Location
- Location: Tatworth, Somerset, England
- Interactive map of Church of St John the Evangelist
- Coordinates: 50.8477°N 2.9573°W

Architecture
- Architect: Charles Pinch
- Type: Church
- Style: Early English

The Church of St John the Evangelist is a Church of England parish church in Tatworth, Somerset, England. It was built in 1850–51 to the design of Charles Pinch of Bath and is a Grade II listed building.

== History ==
Efforts towards the building of a chapel of ease at Tatworth began in 1840, after Rev. John Edwin Lance, the rector of Buckland St Mary, donated £100 towards its construction. At the time, the parish of Chard was considered by the Bath and Wells Diocesan Church Building Association as in great need of additional church accommodation. Tatworth and its neighbouring hamlets were situated up to three and a half miles from the parish church of St Mary the Virgin.

During 1840, further funds were raised and a plot of land was offered by Mr. J. B. Coles of Parrock's Lodge. A grant of £95 was also received by the Bath and Wells Diocesan Church Building Association. After a delay of some months, a meeting of the building committee in June 1841 selected a site gifted by Earl Poulett, the lord of the manor, who also donated £50 and building stone from his quarries. Construction was expected to start in August 1841.

Although the Church Commissioners approved the plans drawn up by Mr. Charles Pinch of Bath, construction did not begin and the scheme was postponed. It was revived by the end of the decade and the foundation stone was laid by Mrs. Whitehead, the wife of the vicar, Rev. W. B. Whitehead, on 18 June 1850. The church was built by Mr. W. Davis of Langport, with Mr. Pinch supervising the work.

The church was consecrated by the Bishop of Jamaica, Rev. Aubrey Spencer, on 9 September 1851. The Bishop performed the consecration on behalf of the Bishop of Bath and Wells, who was unable to attend due to illness. By the time of the church's completion, approximately £1,250 of the £1,400 cost had been raised, mostly by public subscription. Grants were received from the Parent Church Building Association (£140), the Bath and Wells Diocesan Building Society (£145) and the Church Building Commission (£300). Tatworth was made its own ecclesiastical parish from Chard in 1866, with St John's becoming the parish church.

Mr. J. B. Payne of Chard gifted an organ to the church, which was opened on 2 October 1860. In order to accommodate the instrument, funds were raised by public subscription for the construction of a gallery at the west end of the nave. The churchyard was extended by approximately a quarter of an acre in 1874 and consecrated by the Bishop of Bath and Wells, the Right Rev. Lord Arthur Hervey, on 23 June 1874. A new organ built by Henry Speechly and Sons of Dalston was installed in 1897 and formally opened on 6 May 1897.

The church underwent restoration in 1910–11, which included the renovation of the roof and repair of the vestry's walls. The work was carried out by Mr. J. H. Bishop of Chard. The organ was reconditioned in 1959 for a cost of £400 and rededicated by the vicar, Rev. N. F. D. Coleridge, on 28 February 1960. Restoration of the church was carried out at the same time. An attached church hall was built in the late 20th century.

== Architecture ==
St John's is built of local stone and flint, with Hamstone dressings and slate roofs. It is made up of a five-bay nave, chancel, vestry and south porch, with an attached church hall. The west gable has a turret containing two bells and surmounted by a spire. The main timbers of the roof are formed into arched trusses, supported by stone corbels. The nave contains a gallery at the west end.

The pulpit and reading desk are of carved oak, and the octagonal font is of Bath stone. The reredos was added in 1891, designed and carved by the vicar, Rev. Henry Stuart King. Stained glass was added to the east end of the church in 1905 and the stained glass of the south chancel window was installed in 1962.
