= W. G. Vowles =

English organ builder (1826–1912)

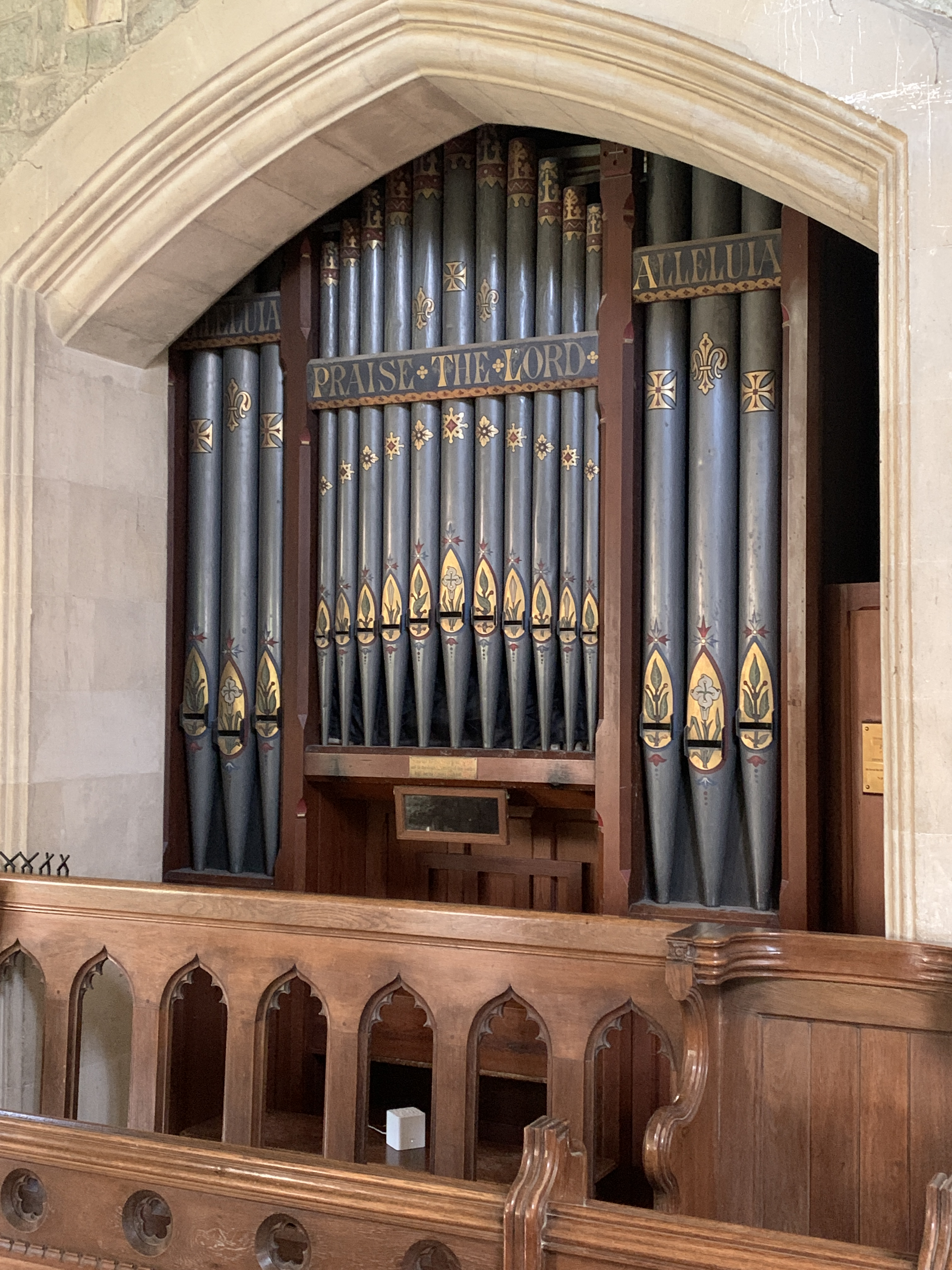
The 1867 Vowles organ in St Peter's Church, Stourton, Wiltshire

William Gibbons Vowles (usually known as W. G. Vowles or Vowles) (1826 – 25 February 1912) was an English pipe organ maker and refurbisher in Bristol, who established his practice in 1856, although with antecedents dating back to 1753. On his retirement in 1908, the firm was incorporated as W. G. Vowles Ltd. That successor firm was acquired by J. W. Walker & Sons Ltd in 1958. Most Vowles organs were installed in the South West of England.

== Early life ==
Vowles was born in Bristol in 1826, the son of Reuben Vowles, a glazier, and his first wife Louisa (née Hopkins).

== Origins of his practice ==
Brice Seede (1709–1790) was an architect and woodcarver who settled in Bristol in 1753, becoming an organ-builder. He was succeeded by his son Richard Seede (1743–1823). In turn, the younger Seede was succeeded by his apprentice, John Smith (1781–1847). Smith was succeeded by his nephew, Joseph Monday (1798–1856).

Some notable organs have survived from Vowles's predecessor practices. One of the Seedes, as well as Smith, Monday and Vowles, all worked on the 1719 Renatus Harris organ at Bristol Cathedral, with Vowles rebuilding it in 1861. The 1794 Brice Seede organ at Powderham Castle is still extant, albeit slightly modified. The 1785 Richard Seede organ at Lulworth Castle is also still extant. The 1830 John Smith organ in the Lord Mayor's Chapel in Bristol is another survivor, with modifications by Vowles and Percy Daniel.

== Career ==
Vowles was trained as an organ-builder by Joseph Monday (also spelt Munday), whose daughter he married. He founded his own firm in 1856, on Monday's death. Vowles retired in 1908, at which point the practice was incorporated as a limited company, W. G. Vowles Ltd. The firm suffered a factory fire in 1924, but continued to trade, until it was taken over by J. W. Walker & Sons Ltd in 1958.

== Personal life ==
In 1848 he married Eliza Matilda Rowles Monday, daughter of the organ-builder Joseph Monday. They had three sons and two daughters; two of the sons followed their father in the organ-building trade.

== Some Vowles organs ==
Vowles-Organ (1890) in St. German Speyer

Few organs by Vowles have survived in their original specification. Many have been lost. Notable losses include that in the former Catholic Pro-Cathedral of the Holy Apostles, Bristol.

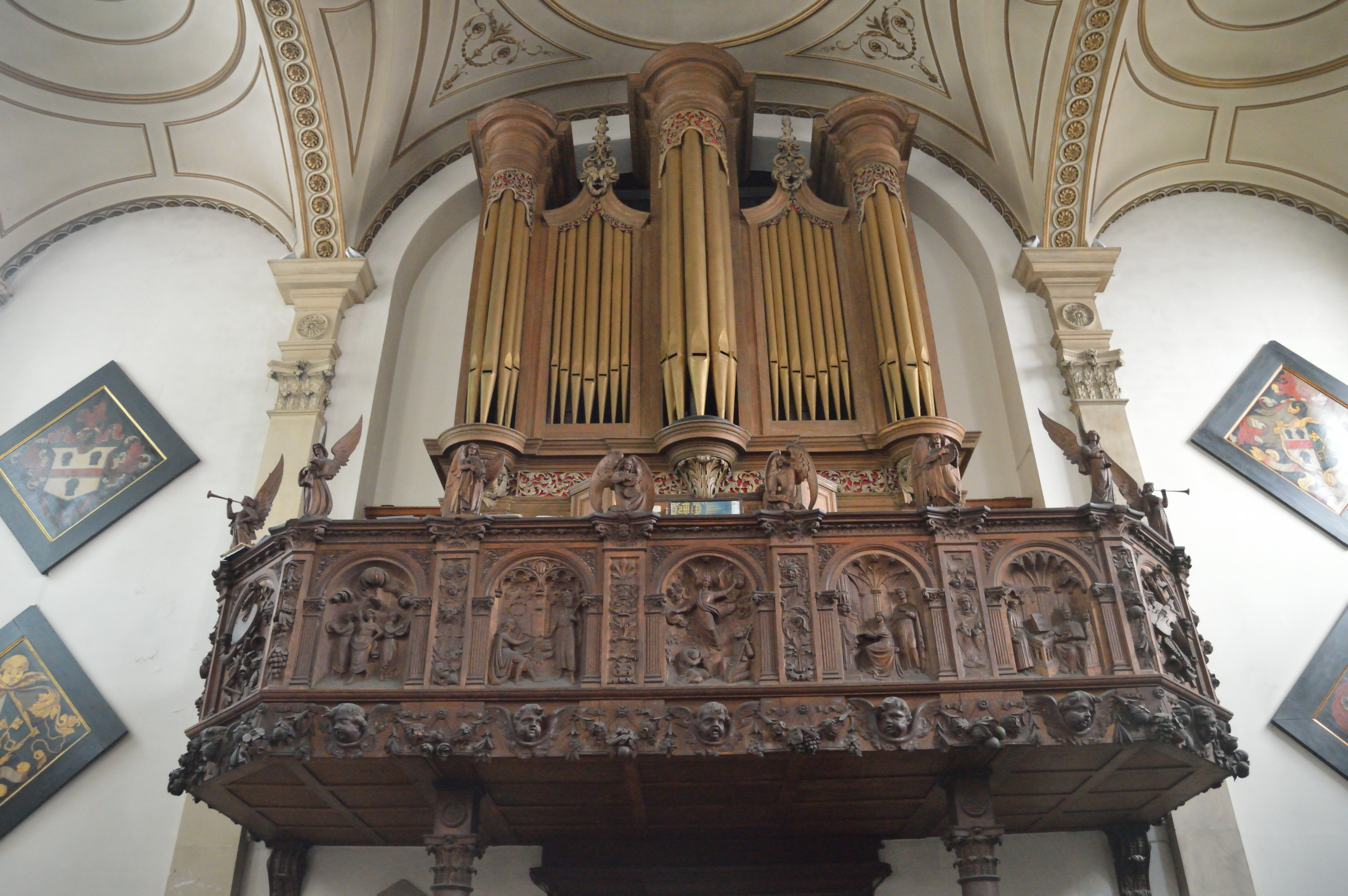
The 1707 Renatus Harris organ at Christ Church, Bristol, rebuilt by Vowles in 1869 and 1889

A survivor, although much modified by Roger Taylor in 1997, is the 1707 Renatus Harris organ in Christ Church, Bristol, rebuilt by Vowles in 1869 and 1889. The church describes the organ in its current specification as "immensely satisfying to play". Another survivor, little modified, is Vowles's organ in St Benet's Catholic church in Beccles, Suffolk, originally built for the Catholic church in nearby Bungay.

After closure of Porthkerry Methodist Church in Barry, the 1890 Vowles organ was transferred to Germany and restored, where it now plays in the Priest Seminary in Speyer.

Not all opinions about Vowles's organs were positive. In 1909 the 1867 Vowles organ in St Mary Redcliffe, Bristol was regarded as "impossibly obsolete" (and was replaced by a new-build by Harrison & Harrison). In the 1980s, Mander Organs entirely rebuilt the Vowles organ in the chapel at Mill Hill School, London, describing it as "inaccessible, unreliable and uninspiring".
