= St Cuthbert's Church, Wells =

Anglican church in Wells, Somerset, England

Church of St Cuthbert
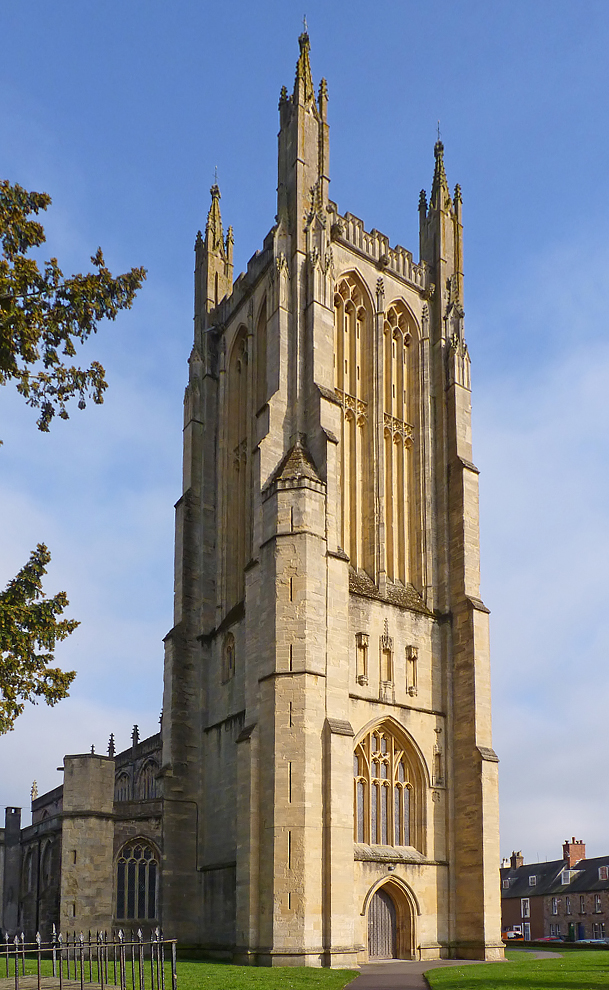

- Location within Somerset

General information
- Location: Wells, Somerset, St Cuthbert St
- Coordinates: 51.2083°N 2.6503°W
- Construction started: 13th century
- Completed: 15th century

Height
- Height: 151 feet (46 metres)

The Church of St Cuthbert is an Anglican parish church in Wells, Somerset, England, dating from the 13th century. It is often mistaken for the cathedral. It has a fine Somerset stone tower and a superb carved roof. It is a Grade I listed building.

== History ==
The dedication of the church to St Cuthbert suggests Saxon origins. Originally an Early English building (13th century), from which the arcade pillars survive, it was much altered in the Perpendicular Period (15th century), when the clerestory and angel roof were added to the seven-bay aisled nave.

It is built of Doulting ashlar stone to most of the south side. The north side is rubble with ashlar dressings. The north transept (St Catherine's Chapel) has the remains of its 13th century reredos on the east wall, which was rediscovered in 1848. The south transept which is otherwise known as The Lady Chapel has another stone reredos dating from 1470, based on the Tree of Jesse theme.

Until 1561 the church had a central tower which either collapsed or was removed, as a result of alterations to the structure and decoration of the church in line with the changes in theological and liturgical practice during the Protestant Reformation. It has been replaced with the current tower over the west door. Bells were cast for the tower by Roger Purdy. The present tower, the third highest in Somerset, is of 3 stages, with the top stage occupying half the total height. The height to the battlements is 123 feet (37 metres), and when the top stones of the pinnacles are included, the total height is 151 feet (46 metres).

The nave's coloured ceiling was repainted in 1963 at the instigation of the then Vicar's wife, Mrs Barnett. During the restoration works in the 1960s a 15th-century carved and panelled ceiling was found above the side chapel which had been covered with plaster during the 18th or 19th century.

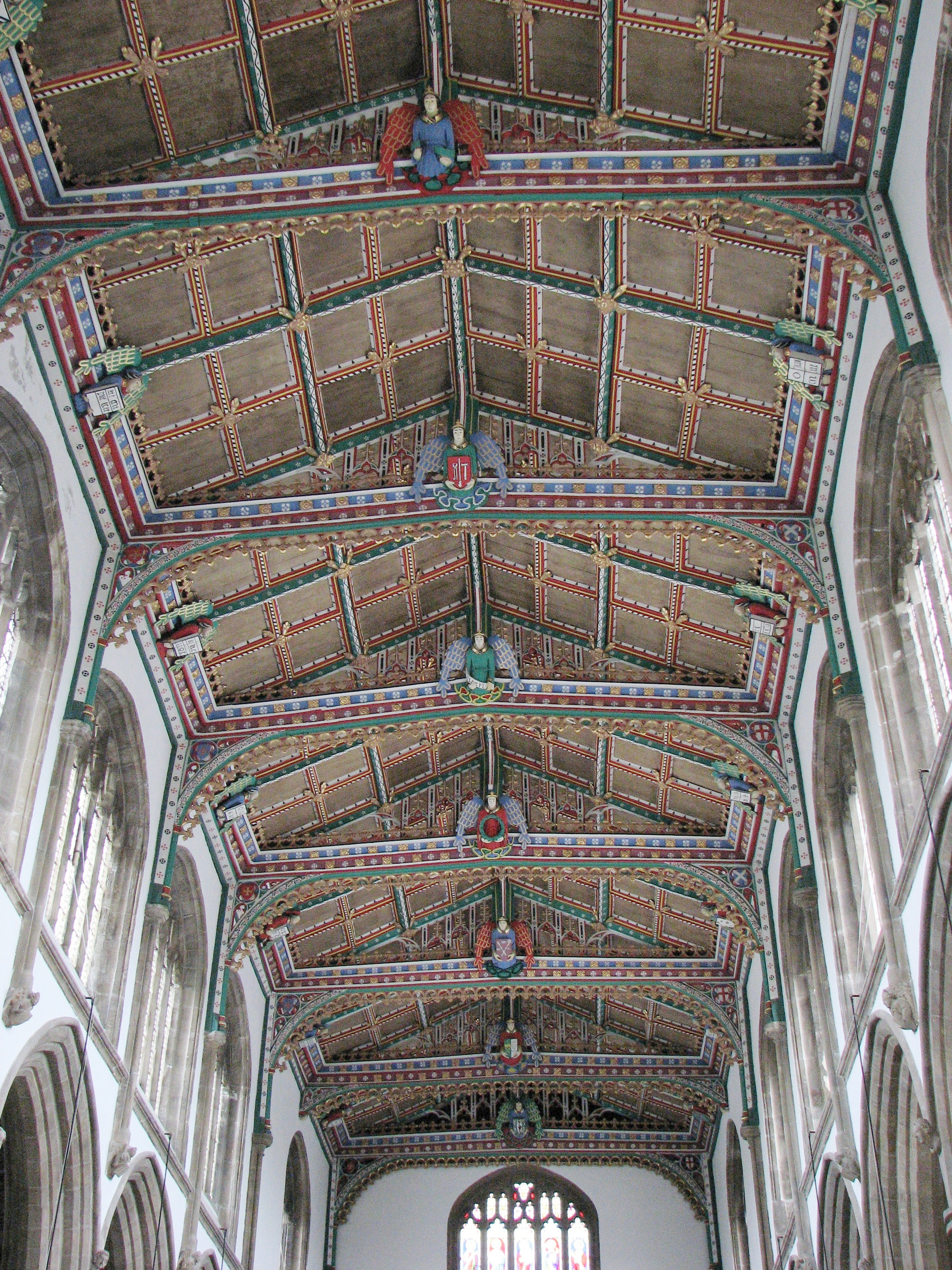
The roof was built in the 15th century and restored and recoloured in 1963

In 1975 a lightning strike caused one of the tower pinnacles to fall through the roof of the nave and damage the nave floor. The replacement pinnacle remained much paler than the other three for some years.

There is a carved wood pulpit of 1636, with an elaborate stair and two carved coats of arms, of Charles I, and Charles II.

== Organ ==
The church contains a pipe organ originally by Henry Lincoln dating from 1820. It was rebuilt by William Sweetland of Bath in 1864, George Osmond of Taunton in 1959 and Percy Daniel in 1984. A specification of the organ can be found on the National Pipe Organ Register.

== Filming location ==
The church played an important role in the feature film Hot Fuzz, which was filmed largely in Wells (which became the fictional town of Sandford); most notably the church fete scene where Adam Buxton's character is killed by a falling part of the church tower masonry. In the early 1970s a lightning strike caused a pinnacle to fall through the nave roof, which may have inspired the scene.

== Parishes ==
- Wells St Cuthbert In
- Wells St Cuthbert Out

== See also ==
- List of ecclesiastical parishes in the Diocese of Bath and Wells
