= St Cuthbert Out =

Civil parish in Somerset, England

Coordinates: 51.180°N 2.695°W

- Civil parish
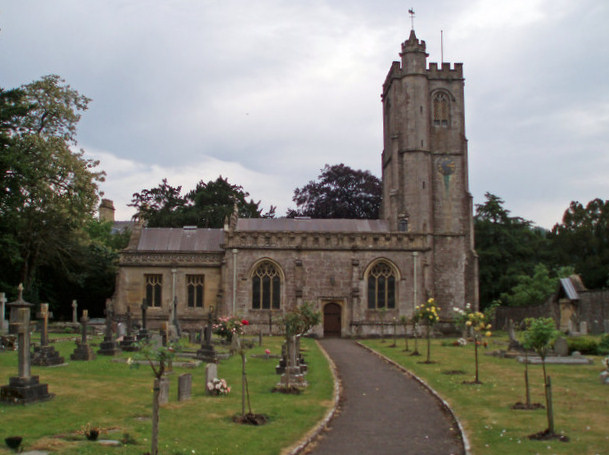
- The church of St Michael and all Angels, Dinder

- Location within Somerset
- Interactive map of St Cuthbert Out
- Area: 22.23 sq mi (57.6 km^{2})
- Population: 4,574 (2021)
  - Density: 206/sq mi (80/km^{2})
- Created: 1866
- OS grid reference: ST 515425
  - London: 110 mi (180 km) ENE
- Unitary authority: Somerset Council
- Ceremonial county: Somerset
- Region: South West
- Country: England
- Sovereign state: United Kingdom
- Settlements: Dinder, Wookey Hole, East, West and South Horrington, Burcott, Coxley, Dulcote, Easton, Haybridge, Green Ore, Launcherley, Lower Milton, Polsham, Somerleaze, Southway, Upper Milton, Worminster
- Post town: WELLS
- Postcode district: BA5
- Dialling code: 01749
- Police: Avon and Somerset
- Fire: Devon and Somerset
- Ambulance: South Western
- UK Parliament: Wells and Mendip Hills
- Website: stcuthbertout-pc.gov.uk

St Cuthbert Out, sometimes Wells St Cuthbert Out, is a civil parish in the county of Somerset, England. It entirely surrounds (but does not include) the city and parish of Wells as an enclave. According to the 2021 census it had a population of 4,574, an increase on the 2011 census count of 3,749.

The parish is named for the Church of St Cuthbert, Wells and was created in 1866. The historic ecclesiastical parish of Wells St Cuthbert had been split into two, with the Wells St Cuthbert In parish covering the area inside the city of Wells (except for the small area covered by the cathedral's liberty of Wells St Andrew).

Population centres in the parish are Dinder, Wookey Hole and East, West and South Horrington. It also includes the smaller settlements of Burcott, Coxley, Dulcote, Easton, Launcherley, Lower Milton, Polsham, Southway, Upper Milton and Worminster. Wookey itself is a separate parish.

The parish is crossed by the national Monarch's Way long distance footpath, as well as the more local Mendip Way footpath, and National Cycle Route 3.

== History ==
Burcott Watermill was built for the Bishop of Wells and listed among his estates in the Domesday Book of 1086. The cast iron water wheel is driven by water from the River Axe soon after it leaves Wookey Hole Caves. Most of the current building and the gearing within the mill, which is used to grind corn, date from 1864 and has been designated by English Heritage as a Grade II listed building. Burcott Manor House was built in the late 16th or early 17th century, with further alterations in the 18th and 20th centuries.

Coxley lies on the River Sheppey where the Anglican Christ Church was built in 1839 by Richard Carver. It has been designated by English Heritage as a grade II listed building.

Dulcote Quarry, is a limestone quarry where the Foster Yeoman Company was founded in 1923. The quarry now measures around 600 m from West to East and around 350 m from North to South. It now has an output of approximately 0.25M tonnes per year of Carboniferous Limestone, for general purpose construction aggregates. A Geodiversity audit of the site was carried out in 2004. Twinhills Woods and Meadows south of Dulcote is a 21.2 hectare (52.4 acre) biological Site of Special Scientific Interest.

Easton is believed to mean 'The enclosure by the water' from the Old English eas and tun. The church of St Paul in Easton, which was built by Richard Carver, dates from 1843. It is a Grade II listed building.

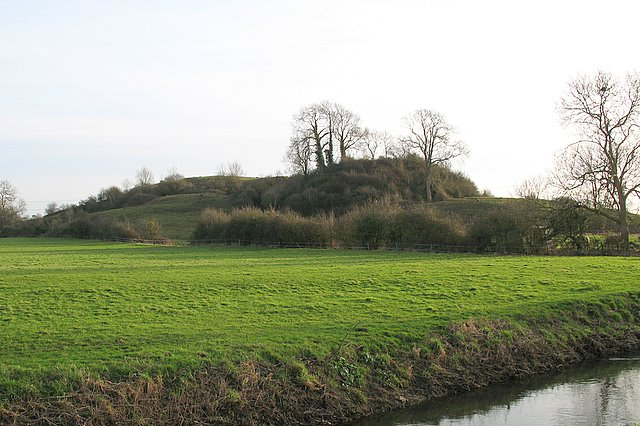
Fenny Castle

Polsham (also spelled Poulsham) is split into two parts with half of the village on the A39 road, which includes a pub (The Three Wells), and half of the village around 600 yards down a country lane. Polsham railway station was on the Somerset and Dorset Joint Railway line. This single platform station, opened in December 1861, was the only stop between Wells and Glastonbury. There is still a 1920s two-storey station house on the site but all traffic ceased through the station on 29 October 1951.

One mile north-west of Polsham are the earthwork remains of Fenny Castle, a motte and bailey castle sited on a natural hillock, however since boundary changes were introduced this is now in the parish of Wookey.

== Notable buildings and structures ==
The former Mendip Hospital at Horrington was built in 1845–47 as the County Lunatic Asylum, by Sir George Gilbert Scott and W. B. Moffatt, supervised by Richard Carver. It is Grade II listed. The hospital chapel is also listed.

The Mendip transmitting station is within the parish, on Pen Hill; its 293m high mast is the tallest structure in south west England.

== Governance ==
The parish council has responsibility for local issues, including setting an annual precept (local rate) to cover the council’s operating costs and producing annual accounts for public scrutiny. The parish council evaluates local planning applications and works with the local police, district council officers, and neighbourhood watch groups on matters of crime, security, and traffic. The parish council's role also includes initiating projects for the maintenance and repair of parish facilities, as well as consulting with the district council on the maintenance, repair, and improvement of highways, drainage, footpaths, public transport, and street cleaning. Conservation matters (including trees and listed buildings) and environmental issues are also the responsibility of the council.

For local government purposes, since 1 April 2023, the parish comes under the unitary authority of Somerset Council. Prior to this, it was part of the non-metropolitan district of Mendip (established under the Local Government Act 1972). It was part of Wells Rural District before 1974.

It is also part of the Wells and Mendip Hills county constituency represented in the House of Commons of the Parliament of the United Kingdom. It elects one Member of Parliament (MP) by the first past the post system of election.

=== Wards ===
The civil parish is divided into four parish wards. They are (with the number of councillors each elects to the parish council, in brackets): North (five), South (three), East (four) and West (five).
