= Camelot =

Castle and court associated with King Arthur

- Matter of Britain location
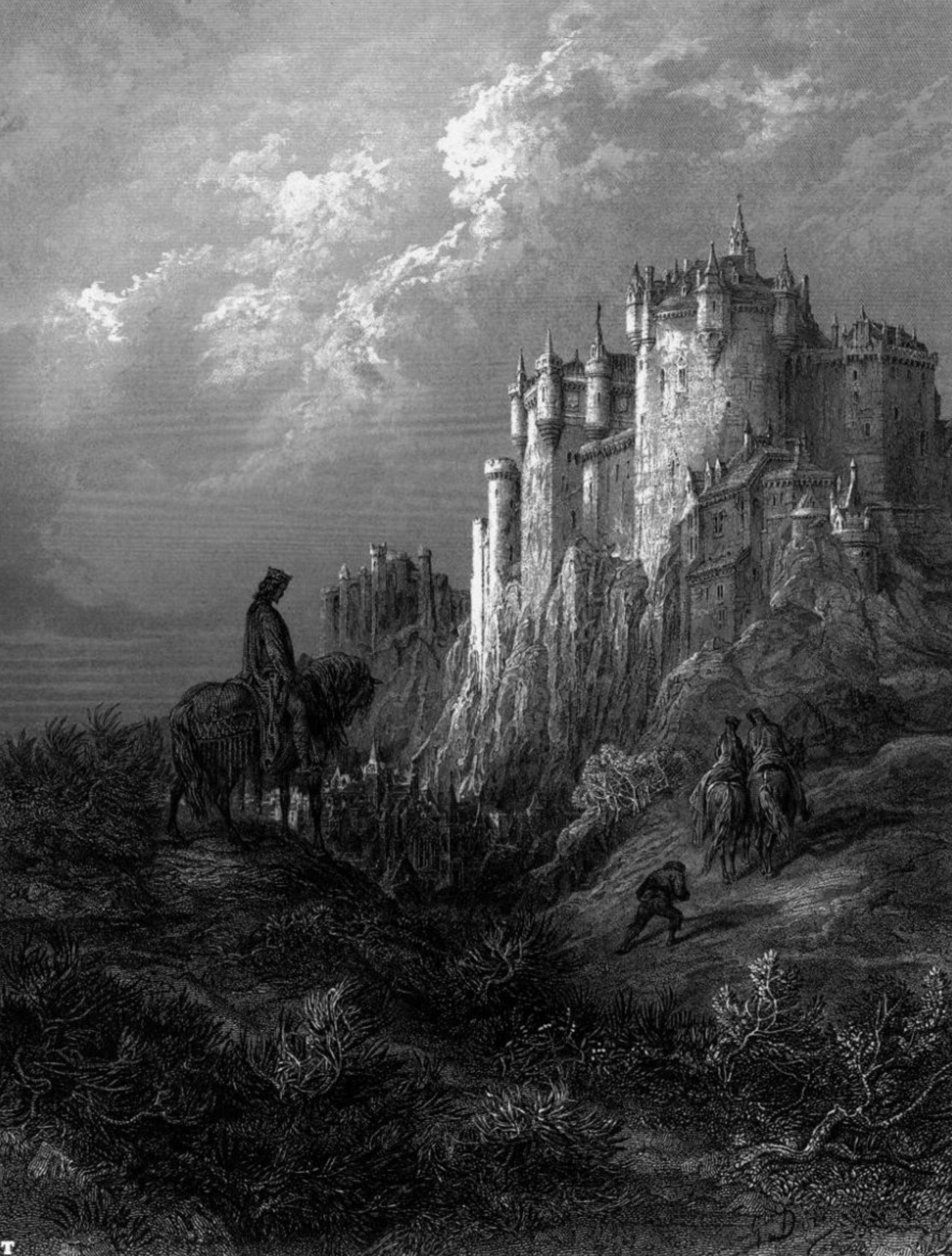
- Gustave Doré's illustration of Camelot from Idylls of the King (1867)
- First appearance: Lancelot, the Knight of the Cart
- Created by: Chrétien de Troyes

In-universe information
- Ruled by: King Arthur
- Characters: Guinevere, Knights of the Round Table, Morgan le Fay

Camelot is a legendary castle and court associated with King Arthur. Absent in the early Arthurian material, Camelot first appeared in 12th-century French romances and eventually came to be described as the fantastic capital of Arthur's realm and a symbol of the Arthurian world.

Medieval texts locate it somewhere in Great Britain and sometimes associate it with real cities, though more usually its precise location is not revealed. Most scholars regard it as being entirely fictional, its unspecified geography being perfect for chivalric romance writers. Nevertheless, arguments about the location of the "real Camelot" have occurred since the 15th century and continue today in popular works and for tourism purposes.

== Etymology ==
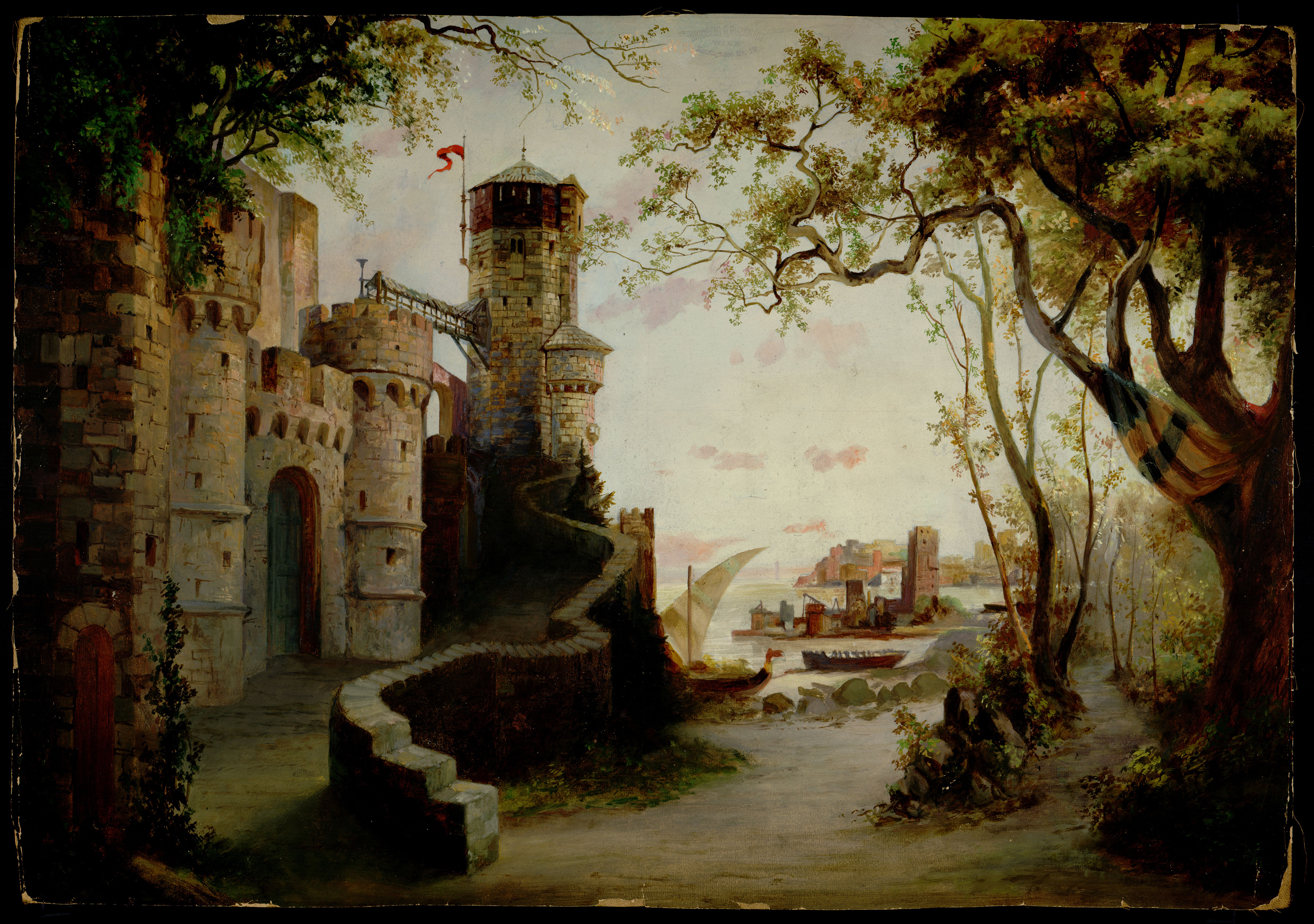
King Arthur's Castle by Anton Brioschi (1886)

The name's derivation is uncertain. It has numerous different spellings in medieval French Arthurian romances, including Camaalot, Camalot, Chamalot, Camehelot (sometimes read as Camchilot), Camaaloth, Caamalot, Camahaloth, Camaelot, Kamaalot, Kamaaloth, Kaamalot, Kamahaloth, Kameloth, Kamaelot, Kamelot, Kaamelot, Cameloth, and Gamalaot. Arthurian scholar Ernst Brugger suggested that it was a corruption of the site of Arthur's final battle, the Battle of Camlann, in Welsh tradition. Roger Sherman Loomis believed it was derived from Cavalon, a place name that he suggested was a corruption of Avalon (under the influence of the Breton place name Cavallon). He further suggested that Cavalon became Arthur's capital due to confusion with Arthur's other traditional court at Caerleon (Caer Lleon in Welsh).

Others have suggested a derivation from the British Iron Age and Romano-British place name Camulodunum, one of the first capitals of Roman Britain and which would have significance in Romano-British culture. Indeed, John Morris, the English historian who specialized in the study of the institutions of the Roman Empire and the history of Sub-Roman Britain, suggested in his book The Age of Arthur that as the descendants of Romanized Britons looked back to a golden age of peace and prosperity under Rome, the name "Camelot" of Arthurian legend may have referred to the capital of Britannia (Camulodunum) in Roman times. It is unclear, however, where Chrétien de Troyes would have encountered the name Camulodunum, or why he would render it as Camaalot, though Urban T. Holmes argued Chrétien could have had access to Book 2 of Pliny's Natural History, where it is rendered as Camaloduno.

== Medieval literature ==
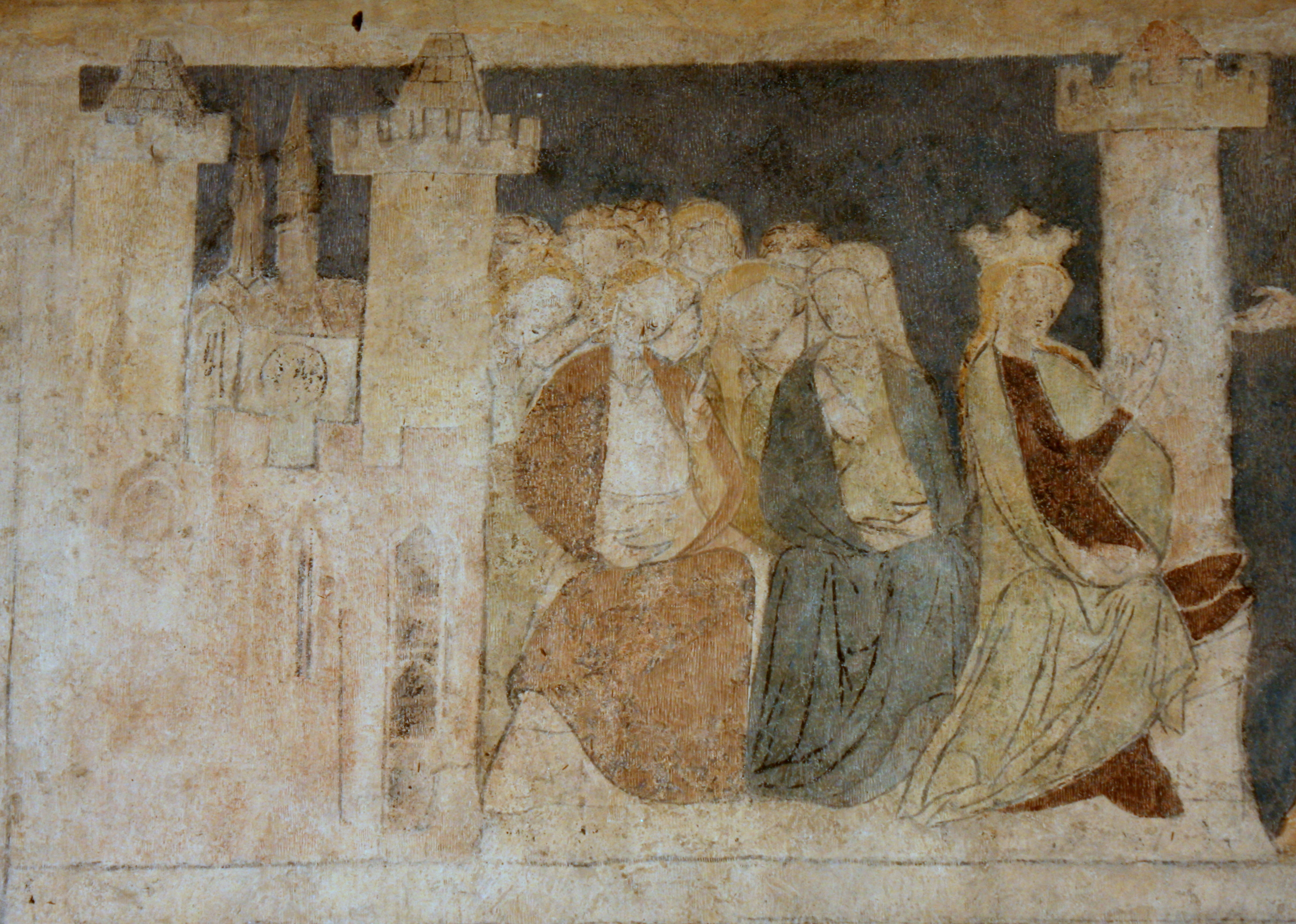
Guinevere at Camelot in a 14th-century fresco at Siedlęcin Tower

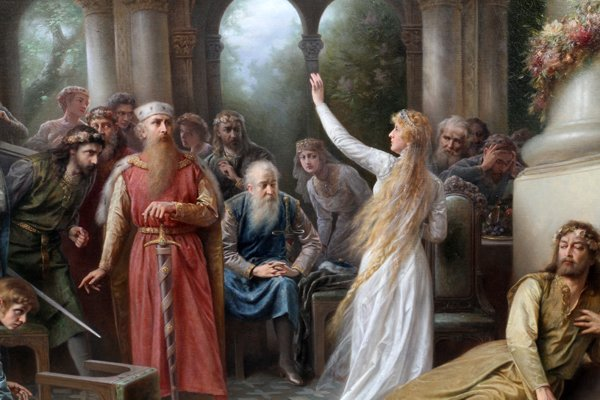
Raimund von Wichera's Guinevere and the Court at Camelot (1900)

Arthur's court at Camelot is mentioned for the first time in Chrétien's poem Lancelot, the Knight of the Cart, dating to the 1170s, though it does not appear in all the manuscripts. In the C manuscript (Paris, Bibliothèque Nationale de France, fonds français 794, folio 27r), which might in fact contain the proper reading of Chretien's original text, instead of the place name there is the Old French phrase con lui plot, meaning "as he pleased". The other manuscripts spell the name variously as Chamalot (MS A, f. f. 196r), Camehelot (MS E, f. 1r), Chamaalot (MS G, f. 34f), and Camalot (MS T, f. 41v); the name is missing, along with the rest of the passage containing it, in MS V (Vatican, Biblioteca Vaticana, Regina 1725). Camelot is mentioned only in passing and is not described:

A un jor d'une Acenssion / Fu venuz de vers Carlion / Li rois Artus et tenu ot / Cort molt riche a Camaalot, / Si riche com au jor estut.
King Arthur, one Ascension Day, had left Caerleon and held a most magnificent court at Camelot with all the splendour appropriate to the day.

Nothing in Chrétien's poem suggests the level of importance Camelot would have in later romances. For Chrétien, Arthur's chief court was in Caerleon in Wales; this was the king's primary base in Geoffrey of Monmouth's Historia Regum Britanniae and subsequent literature. Chrétien depicts Arthur, like a typical medieval monarch, holding court at a number of cities and castles.

It is not until the 13th-century French prose romances, including the Vulgate and Post-Vulgate cycles, that Camelot began to supersede Caerleon, and even then, many descriptive details applied to Camelot derive from Geoffrey's earlier grand depiction of the Welsh town. Most Arthurian romances of this period produced in English or Welsh did not follow this trend; Camelot was referred to infrequently, and usually in translations from French. However, in Britain, Arthur's court was generally located at Caerleon, or at Carlisle, which is usually identified with the "Carduel" of the French romances. One exception is Sir Gawain and the Green Knight, which locates Arthur's court at Camelot.

From Geoffrey's grand description of Caerleon, Camelot gains its impressive architecture, its many churches and the chivalry and courtesy of its inhabitants. Geoffrey's description in turn drew on an already established tradition in Welsh oral tradition of the grandeur of Arthur's court. The tale Culhwch and Olwen, associated with the Mabinogion and perhaps first written in the 11th century, draws a dramatic picture of Arthur's hall and his many powerful warriors who go from there on great adventures, placing it in Celliwig, an uncertain locale in Cornwall.

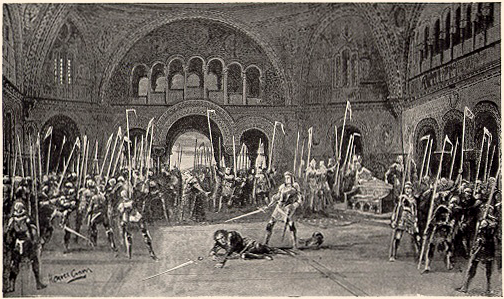
The Great Hall of Camelot, a scene painting by Hawes Craven (1895)

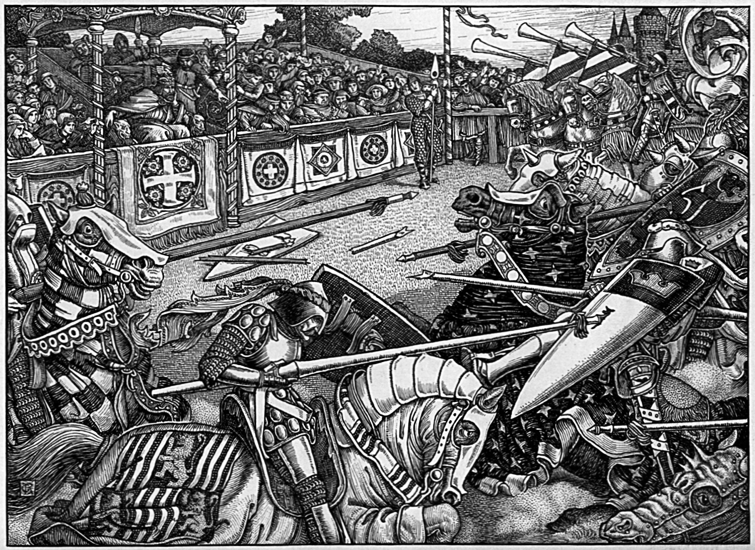
A jousting tournament at Camelot, an Idylls of the King illustration by George and Louis Rhead (1898)

The Lancelot-Grail cycle and the texts it influenced depict the city of Camelot as standing along a river, downstream from Astolat. It is surrounded by plains and forests, and its magnificent cathedral, St. Stephen's, originally established by Josephus, the son of Joseph of Arimathea, is the religious centre for Arthur's Knights of the Round Table. There, Arthur and Guinevere are married and there are the tombs of many kings and knights. In a mighty castle stands the Round Table, created by Merlin for Arthur's father, Uther Pendragon; it is here that Galahad conquers the Siege Perilous, and where the knights see a vision of the Holy Grail and swear to find it. Jousts are often held in a meadow outside the city.

Its imprecise geography serves the romances well, as Camelot becomes less a literal place than a powerful symbol of Arthur's court and universe. There is also a Kamaalot featured as the home of Percival's mother in the romance Perlesvaus. In Palamedes and some other works, including the Post-Vulgate cycle, King Arthur's Camelot is eventually razed to the ground by the treacherous King Mark of Cornwall (who had besieged it earlier) in his invasion of Logres after the Battle of Camlann. In the Tavola Ritonda, Camelot is abandoned and falls to ruin after the death of Arthur.

Although the court at Celliwig is the most prominent in remaining early Welsh manuscripts, the various versions of the Welsh Triads agree in giving Arthur multiple courts, one in each of the areas inhabited by the Celtic Britons: Cornwall, Wales and the Hen Ogledd. This perhaps reflects the influence of widespread oral traditions common by the 9th century which are recorded in various place names and features such as Arthur's Seat, indicating Arthur was a hero known and associated with many locations across Brittonic areas of Britain as well as Brittany. Even at this stage Arthur could not be tied to one location. Many other places are listed as a location where Arthur holds court in the later romances, Carlisle and London perhaps being the most prominent.

In the 15th century, the English writer Thomas Malory created the image of Camelot most familiar today in his Le Morte d'Arthur, a summary compilation work based mostly on the French romances. He firmly identifies Camelot with Winchester in England, an identification that remained popular over the centuries, though it was rejected by Malory's own editor, William Caxton, who preferred a Welsh location.

== Identifications ==
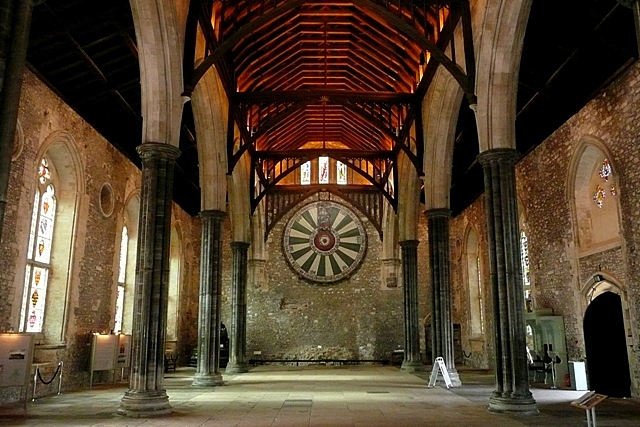
Winchester Castle's Great Hall with a 13th-century prop Round Table

Arthurian scholar Norris J. Lacy commented that "Camelot, located nowhere in particular, can be anywhere." The romancers' versions of Camelot draw on earlier traditions of Arthur's fabulous court. The Celliwig of Culhwch and Olwen appears in the Welsh Triads as well; this early Welsh material places Wales' greatest leader outside its national boundaries. Geoffrey's description of Caerleon is probably based on his personal familiarity with the town and its Roman ruins; it is less clear that Caerleon was associated with Arthur before Geoffrey. Several French romances (Perlesvaus, the Didot Perceval attributed to Robert de Boron, and even the early romances of Chrétien such as Erec and Enide and Yvain, the Knight of the Lion) have Arthur hold court at "Carduel in Wales", a northern city based on the real Carlisle. Malory's identification of Camelot as Winchester was probably partially inspired by the latter city's history: it had been the capital of Wessex under Alfred the Great, and boasted the Winchester Round Table, an artefact constructed in the 13th century but widely believed to be the original by Malory's time. Caxton rejected the association, saying Camelot was in Wales and that its ruins could still be seen; this is a likely reference to the Roman ruins at Caerwent.

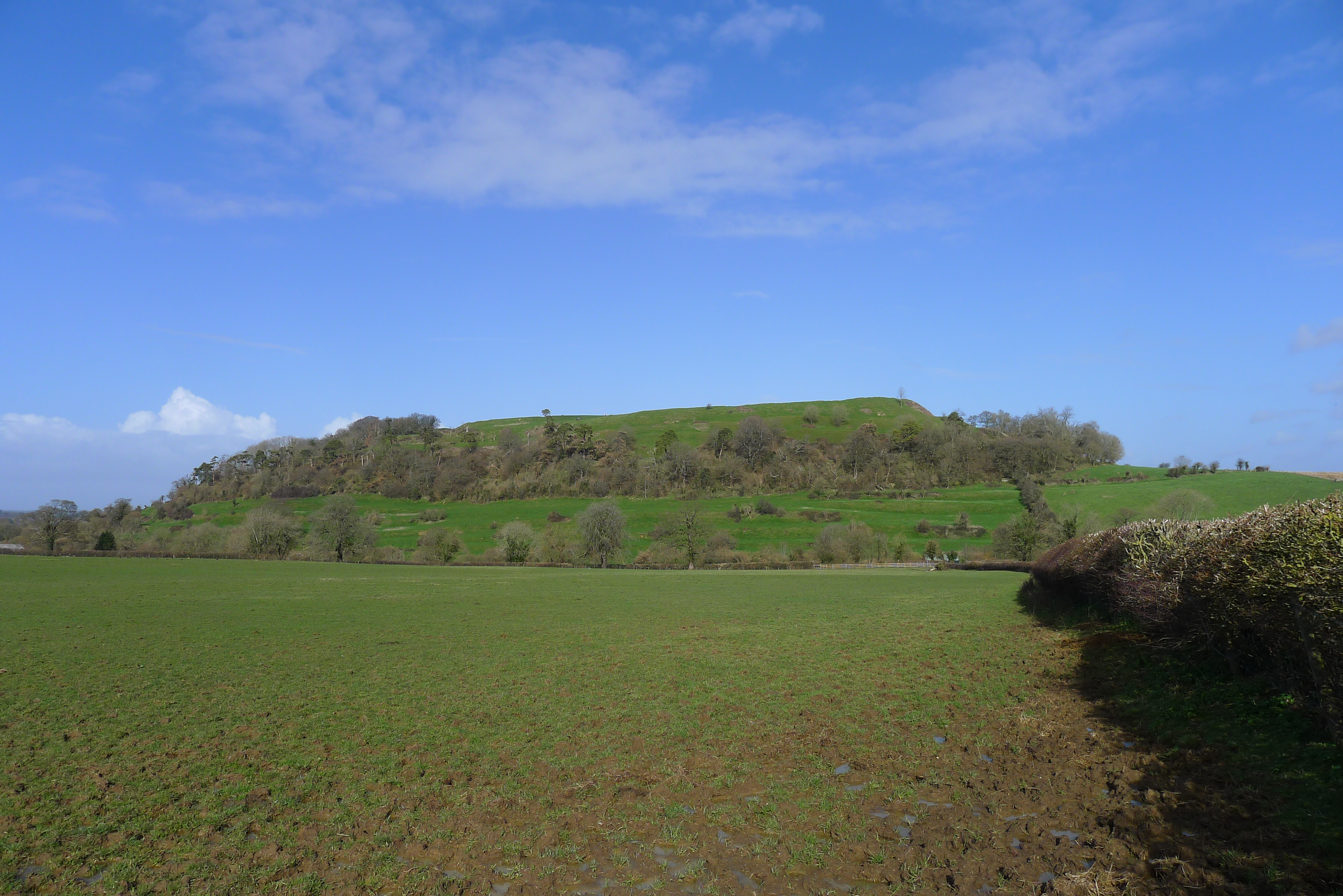
Cadbury Castle archaeological site

In 1542, John Leland reported that the locals around Cadbury Castle (formerly known as Camalet) in Somerset considered it to be the original Camelot. This theory, which was repeated by later antiquaries, is bolstered, or may have derived from, Cadbury's proximity to the River Cam and the villages of Queen Camel and West Camel, and remained popular enough to help inspire a large-scale archaeological dig in the 20th century. These excavations, led by archaeologist Leslie Alcock from 1966 to 1970, were titled "Cadbury-Camelot" and won much media attention. The dig revealed that the site seems to have been occupied as early as the 4th millennium BC and to have been refortified and occupied by a major Brittonic ruler and his war band from c. 470. This early medieval settlement continued until around 580. The works were by far the largest known fortification of the period, double the size of comparative caers and with Mediterranean artefacts representing extensive trade and Saxon ones showing possible conquest. The use of the name Camelot and the support of Geoffrey Ashe helped ensure much publicity for the finds, but Alcock himself later grew embarrassed by the supposed Arthurian connection to the site. Following the arguments of David Dumville, Alcock felt the site was too late and too uncertain to be a tenable Camelot. Modern archaeologists follow him in rejecting the name, calling it instead Cadbury Castle hill fort. Despite this, Cadbury remains widely associated with Camelot.

The name of the Romano-British town of Camulodunum (modern Colchester) was derived from the Celtic god Camulus. However, it was located well within territory usually thought to have been conquered early in the 5th century by Saxons, so it is unlikely to have been the location of any "true" Camelot, as Arthur is traditionally dated to the late 5th and early 6th century. The town was definitely known as Colchester as early as the Anglo-Saxon Chronicle in 917. Even Colchester Museum argues strongly regarding the historical Arthur: "It would be impossible and inconceivable to link him to the Colchester area, or to Essex more generally," pointing out that the connection between the name Camulodunum and Colchester was unknown until the 18th century. Arthurian scholar Peter Field has suggested that another Camulodunum, a former Roman fort, is a likely location of King Arthur's Camelot and that "Slack, on the outskirts of Huddersfield in West Yorkshire," is where Arthur would have held court. This is because of the name, and also regarding its strategic location: it is but a few miles from the extreme south-west of Hen Ogledd (also making close to North Wales), and would have been a flagship point in staving off attacks to the Celtic kingdoms from the Angles and others.

Other places in Britain with names related to "Camel" have also been suggested, such as Camelford in Cornwall, located down the River Camel from where Geoffrey places Camlann, the scene of Arthur's final battle. The area's connections with Camelot and Camlann are merely speculative. Further north, Camelon and its connections with Arthur's O'on have been mentioned in relation to Camelot, but Camelon may be an antiquarian neologism coined after the 15th century, with its earlier name being Carmore or Carmure. Graham Phillips rejected the word "Camelot" entirely as just Chrétien's invention and instead proposed the old Roman city of Viroconium (near Shrewsbury in modern England) as Arthur's capital, citing archaeological evidence of a grand palace having been in use around 500 AD. Alistair Moffat identified Camelot with Roxburgh in Scotland.

== Modern culture ==
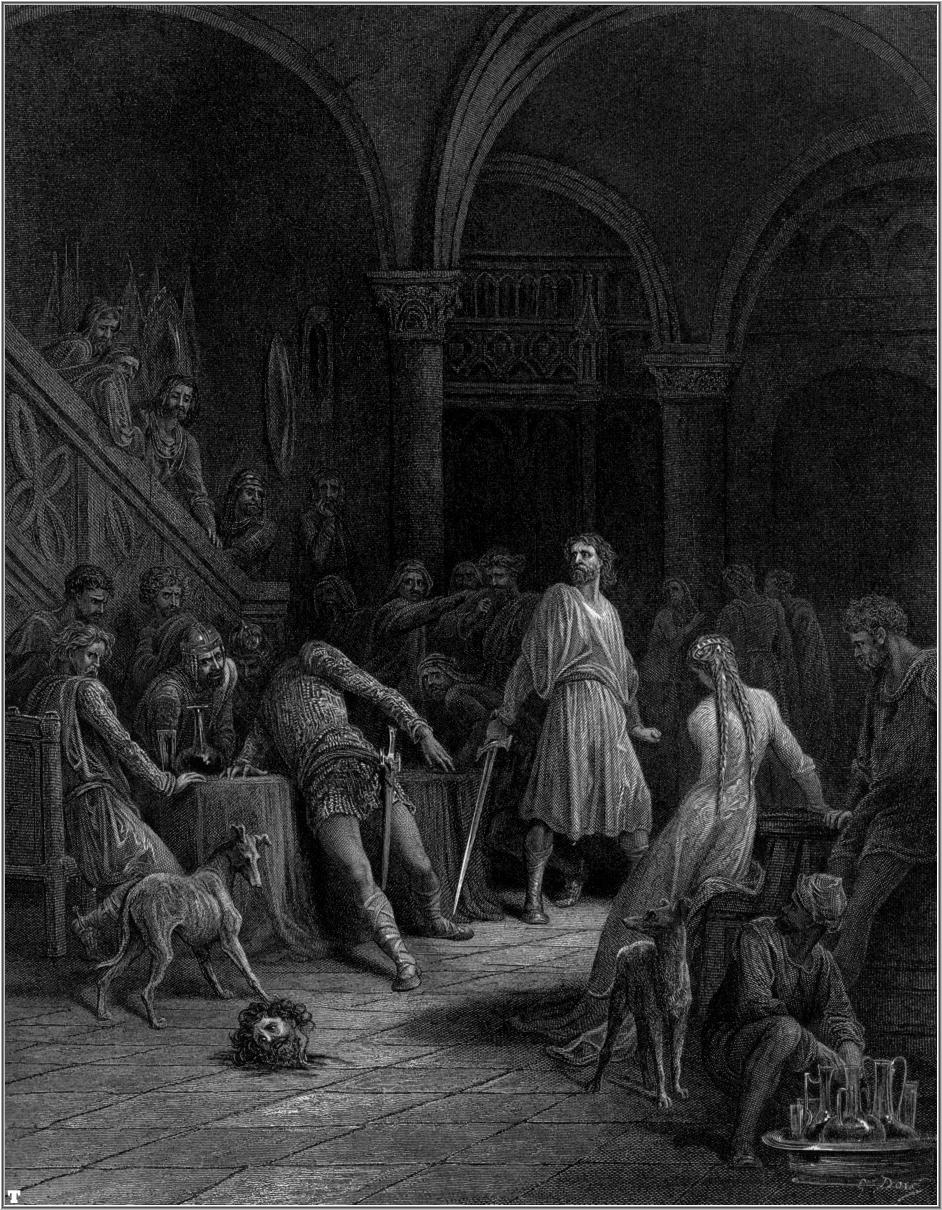
Gawain and the beheaded Green Knight at Camelot, a Doré illustrations for Tennyson

Camelot has become a permanent fixture in modern interpretations of the Arthurian legend. The symbolism of Camelot so impressed Alfred, Lord Tennyson that he wrote up a prose sketch on the castle as one of his earliest attempts to treat the legend. Modern stories typically retain Camelot's lack of precise location and its status as a symbol of the Arthurian world, though they typically transform the castle itself into romantically lavish visions of a High Middle Ages palace. Some writers of the "realist" strain of modern Arthurian fiction have attempted a more sensible Camelot. Inspired by Alcock's Cadbury-Camelot excavation, some authors such as Marion Zimmer Bradley and Mary Stewart place their Camelots in that place and describe it accordingly.

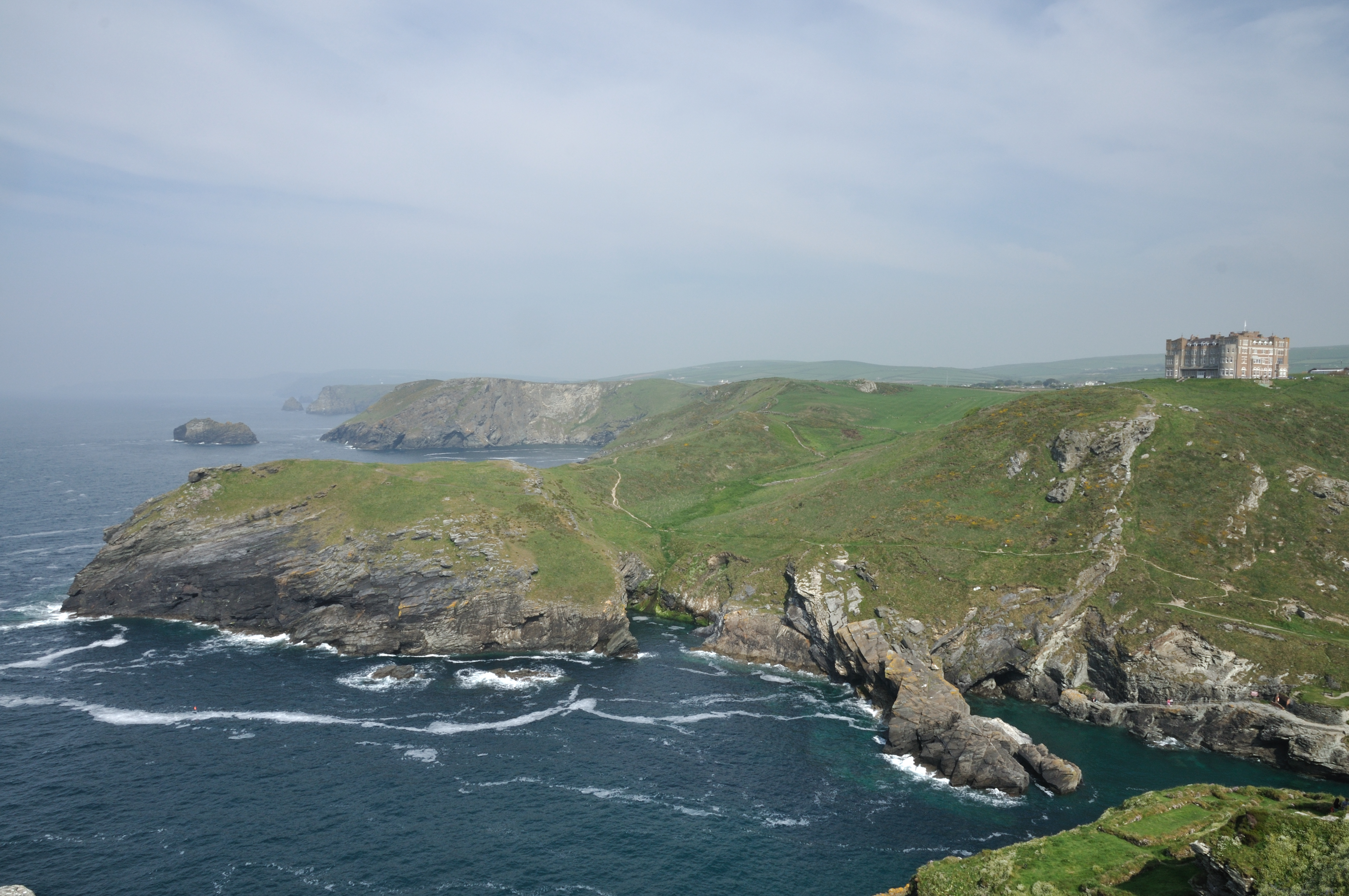
Camelot Castle Hotel featuring a replica of the Winchester Round Table (a view from Tintagel Castle)

Camelot lends its name to the musical Camelot, which was adapted into a film of the same title, featuring the Castle of Coca, Segovia as Camelot. An Arthurian television series Camelot was also named after the castle, as were some other works including the video game Camelot and the comic book series Camelot 3000. French television series Kaamelott presents a humorous alternative version of the Arthurian legend; Camelot Theme Park is a now-abandoned Arthurian theme park resort located in the English county of Lancashire. The Camelot Group was the first operator of the UK National Lottery with lottery machines named after characters, places, and objects in Arthurian legend. The vast cultural impact of Camelot can be seen in numerous works, products, and organisations. Visualizing Camelot, a University of Rochester exhibit by Alan and Barbara Tepa Lupack offered a cross-section of 350 such items in 2024.

In strictly American contexts, Camelot era refers to the presidency of John F. Kennedy. In a 1963 Life interview, Jacqueline, his widow, referenced a line from the Lerner and Loewe musical to describe the Kennedy era White House: "Don't let it be forgot, that once there was a spot, for one brief shining moment, that was known as Camelot." She indicated that it was one of Kennedy's favourite lyrics from the musical and added, "there'll be great Presidents again [...] but there'll never be another Camelot again."

== See also ==
- List of mythological places
- Locations associated with Arthurian legend
