= Leland Trail =

Footpath in Somerset, England

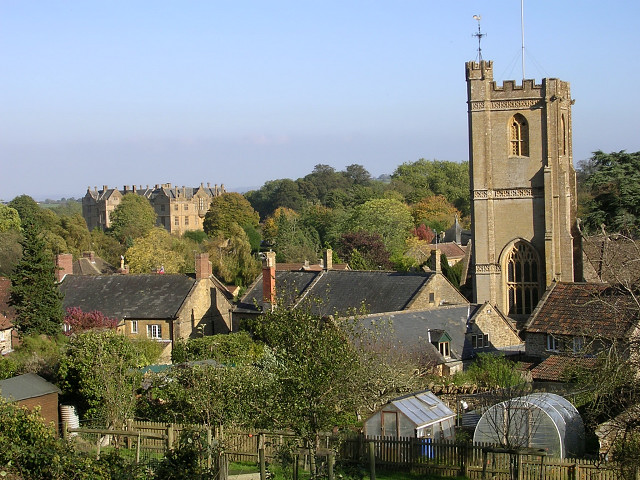
- Montacute, showing the tower of the Church of St. Catherine
- Length: 28 mi (45 km)
- Location: Somerset, England
- Trailheads: Penselwood/Ham Hill Country Park
- Use: Hiking

The Leland Trail is a 28 mi (45 km) footpath in Somerset, England. It was named after the antiquary John Leland, and runs from King Alfred's Tower in Penselwood, southwest to Ham Hill Country Park near Yeovil.

== History ==
The path was established by creating rights of way via tracks and lanes. It is named after John Leland, who visited South Somerset during the years 1535–1543. In his role as royal librarian, his journeys and tasks during that period were mapped out for him by King Henry VIII. His job was to reveal to the King all reference to "antiquities" and possessions of the local churches and priories. The exact route taken by Leland over much of South Somerset may never be known but the remaining records of the time form the basis of the trail.

== Route ==
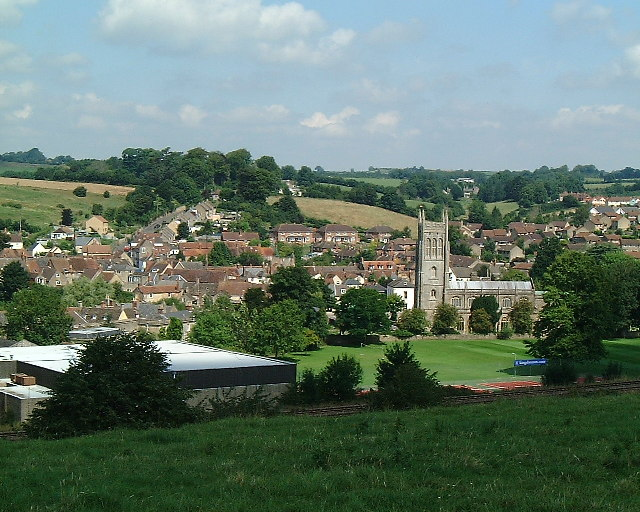
Bruton from the dovecote

Typical all day walks allow the track to be traversed in manageable stages. The route may be broken into seven parts.

The walk from Penselwood to Bruton is fairly easy going for 5 miles (8.0 km) and takes about three hours. Then the journey onward to Castle Cary takes a little over two hours to cover the next 4 miles (6.4 km). The next stage to North Cadbury will add about another two hours to the journey. Queen Camel is a further 4 miles (6.4 km) and takes just over two hours.

The rest of the trail from Queen Camel to Ilchester covers mainly level ground and takes about two hours for a distance of 5 miles (8.0 km). Montacute is the next "port of call" en route, and the slightly more difficult terrain means well over two hours to complete the next 4 miles (6.4 km). Reaching Ham Hill, the end of the trail, takes another hour.

== Places of interest ==
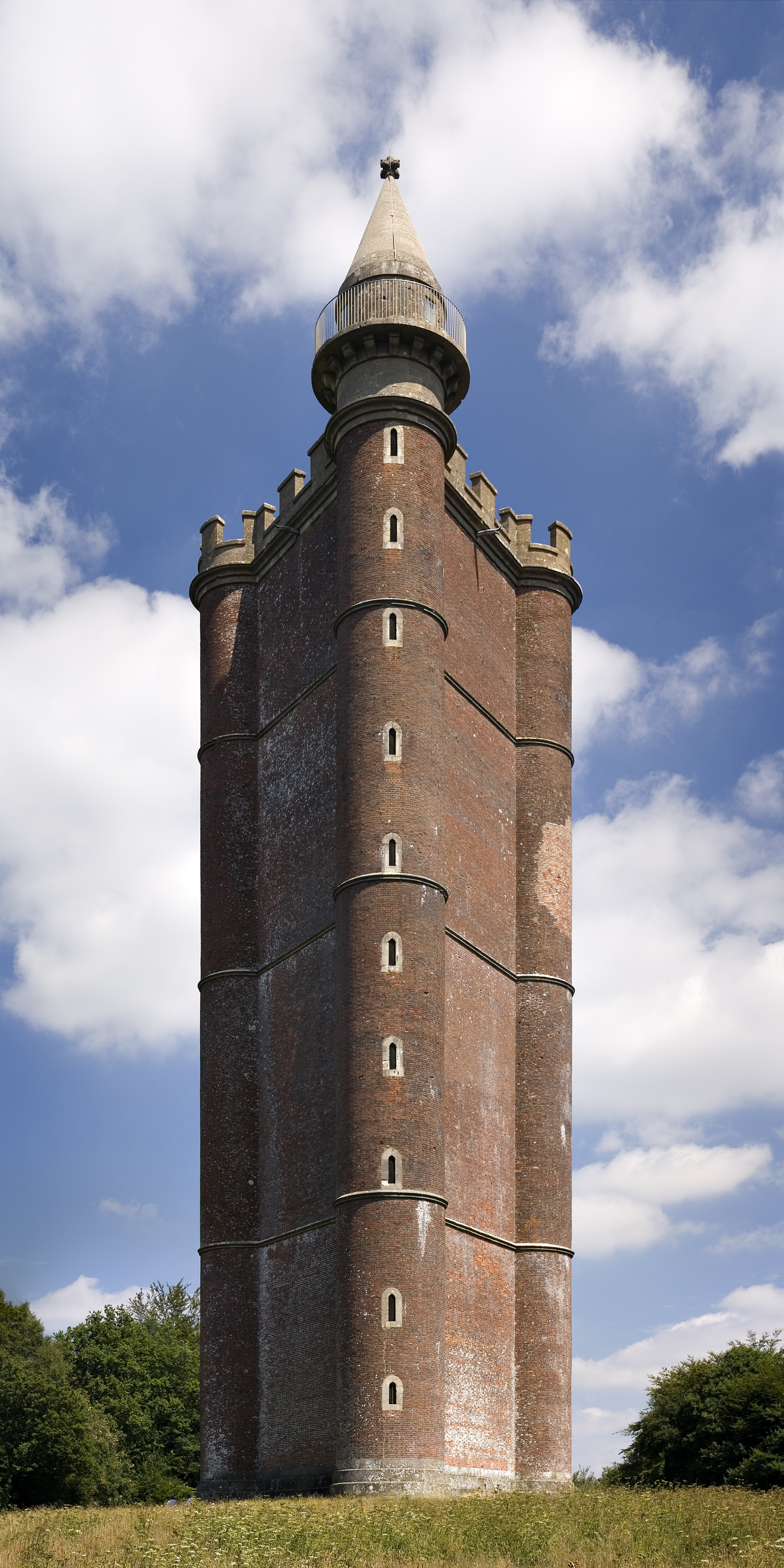
King Alfred's Tower

The forest of Penselwood. Bruton has its packhorse bridge, dovecote and famous twin-towered church. Near Castle Cary is Cadbury Castle, whose summit offers a spectacular panorama of the South Somerset countryside. The busy military airfield at Yeovilton is also home to the Fleet Air Arm Museum. Montacute House is also close to the site of the former Cluniac Montacute Priory. At Ham Hill Country Park, Exmoor, the Quantock Hills, and the Bristol Channel can be seen. Looking east is the trail's starting point, Alfred's Tower.

== Intersecting trails ==
The Leland Trail links with the Monarch's Way at Ilchester, and the Liberty Trail and the River Parrett Trail at Ham Hill.

== Key points and map ==
Point	Coordinates (Links to map resources)	OS Grid Ref	Notes
Start	51.115°N 2.36°W	ST744352	King Alfred's Tower in Penselwood
Packhorse bridge	51.113°N 2.45°W	ST683350	Bruton
Market town and Cadbury Castle	51.087°N 2.513°W	ST641322	Castle Cary
North Cadbury Court	51.045°N 2.522°W	ST635275	North Cadbury
River Cam and Church of St Barnabas	51.020°N 2.578°W	ST595247	Queen Camel
River Yeo	51.001°N 2.682°W	ST522226	Ilchester
Montacute House and Montacute Priory	50.95°N 2.72°W	ST4916	Montacute
End	50.950°N 2.743°W	ST478170	Ham Hill, Somerset
