= St Andrew's Church, Corton Denham =

Church in Somerset, England

St Andrew's Church
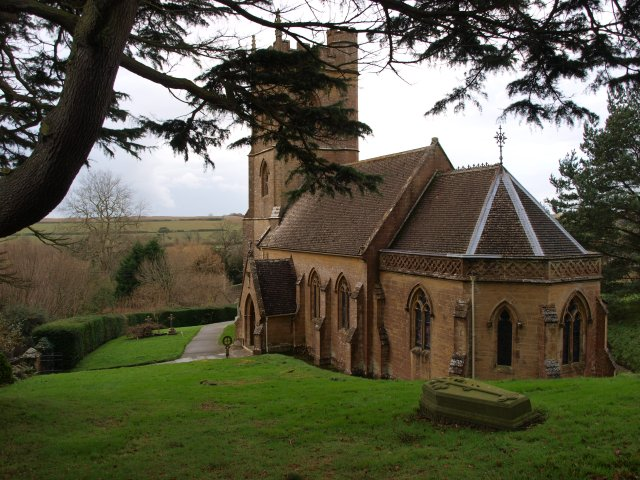

Religion
- Affiliation: Church of England
- Ecclesiastical or organizational status: Active
- Year consecrated: 1870

Location
- Location: Corton Denham, Somerset, England
- Interactive map of St Andrew's Church
- Coordinates: 51.0015°N 2.5202°W

Architecture
- Architect: Mr. Pearce
- Type: Church
- Style: Perpendicular style
- Materials: Hamstone

St Andrew's Church is a Church of England parish church in Corton Denham, Somerset, England. It was built in 1869–70 to replace an earlier church of 13th-century origin. The church is a Grade II listed building. Historic England describes the building as "relatively unaltered" with a "balanced, single-phase composition" and praises the quality of the architectural detailing. The church now forms part of the Cam Vale Benefice.

== History ==
A church has served Corton Denham since at least the 12th-century and it had been dedicated to St Andrew by 1543. The church was made up of an undivided nave and chancel, with a north aisle and west tower containing five bells. Galleries were installed in 1773. By the middle of the 19th-century, the church had become dilapidated and was considered unsafe by the time the decision was made to rebuild it. Furthermore, the church was considered uncomfortable and too small to serve the congregation.

The cost of rebuilding the church amounted to approximately £3,000, with the entire cost being defrayed by Lord Portman, the lord of the manor and principal landowner in the parish. The plans for the church were drawn up by Mr. Pearce, who was employed in the office of Lord Portman's steward, Mr. H. Parsons of Haselbury Plucknett. The chancel roof was designed by Mr. Charles Baker Green of Blandford Forum.

The rebuilding of the church began on 1 March 1869 by Mr. Draper of Crewkerne under the supervision of Mr. Green. The stone work was carried out by Mr. C. Trask of Norton-sub-Hamdon. With the demolition of the old church, its 16th-century bench ends were transferred to the Church of St Mary at Rimpton and the 12th-century font was destroyed. The new church and its churchyard was consecrated by the Bishop of Bath and Wells on 26 July 1870. The rector, Rev. W. B. Portman, was unable to attend the ceremony owing to the recent death of his sister and fever at the rectory.

== Architecture ==
St Andrew's is built of Hamstone with interior dressings of Bath and Doulting stone. It is made up of a four-bay nave, one-and-a-half-bay chancel, north aisle, north-east vestry, south porch and west three-stage tower. The tower has battlements and four carved pinnacles. It contains five bells, one of which was recast in the rebuilding of 1869–70. The church's open timber roof is stained and varnished, with the chancel roof being groined. The arches of the nave roof are supported on carved corbels. The chancel's stone corbels were carved by Mr. Boulton of Cheltenham. The floor of the chancel is laid with Minton's encaustic tiles and the aisles laid with Keinton stone.

New fittings were installed with the rebuilding of the church. The seats are of oak with carved ends. The chancel's seats have carved fronts, the work of Mr. Halliday of Wells. The pulpit and font are of Bath stone and were also carved by Mr. Halliday. The reading desk and lectern are of oak. A marble tablet is located over the south door in memory of Rev. Joseph Heathcote Wyndham, a former rector of Corton Denham. A new organ was installed at the east end of the north aisle in 1870 for a cost of £110. It was built by Mr. Ewens of Stratford-upon-Avon. Stained glass by Jean-Baptiste Capronnier and Hardman & Co. was added to the church in the early 20th-century.

== Churchyard ==
In 1985, the following chest tombs in the churchyard became Grade II listed:

- Mary and John Relett, 1719 and 1722
- Joseph Longman, 1759
- Joseph Longman, 1763
- Caleb Barrettm, 1810
- Elizabeth and George Weaver, 1822 and 1824
