= Camelot (ward) =

Former electoral ward in Somerset, England

Coordinates: 51.02°N 2.57°W

Camelot is a former electoral ward of the defunct South Somerset District Council in Somerset, England. It was one of the wards that made up the former parliamentary constituency of Somerton and Frome.

Camelot covered an area of 3,380 hectares (8,400 acres) and in 2011 a population of 2,742 was recorded.

A rural ward, the A303 road passes through; it contains the villages of Marston Magna, Rimpton, Sparkford, Queen Camel, West Camel and Weston Bampfylde.

The ward was represented by one councillor, most recently Michael Lewis, a member of the Conservative Party who was re-elected in the district elections of 2015, with 68% of the vote.
