= Church of St Barnabas, Queen Camel =

Church in Somerset, England

Church of St Barnabas
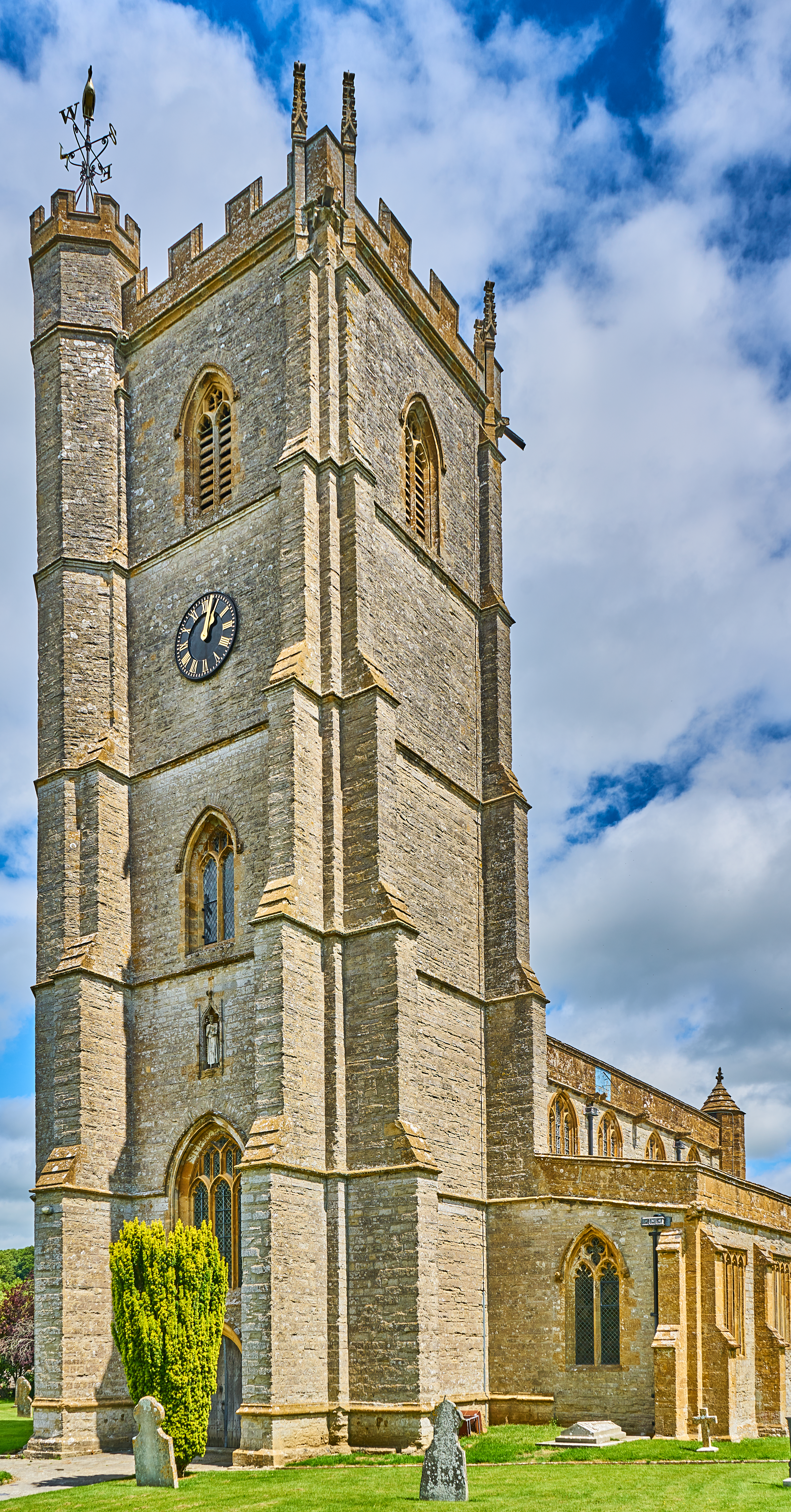

- Location within Somerset
- 51°01′19″N 2°34′26″W
- Location: Queen Camel, Somerset, England

History
- Built: 14th century

Listed Building – Grade I
- Designated: 24 March 1961
- Reference no.: 1249203

The Church of St Barnabas is a church in Queen Camel, Somerset, England. The church was built in the 14th century and has been designated as a Grade I listed building.

A former church in Queen Camel was the mother church to Somerton, Chilton Cantelo and the surrounding area before 1140. In the 12th century the church was given to Cleeve Abbey. The first recorded rector was in 1317. The church underwent Victorian restoration in 1888.

The church has a 96 feet (29 m) high tower, built in five stages, which dates from around 1491, The tower contains a heavy ring of six bells. While St Buryan in Cornwall is home to the heaviest ring of six bells by the weight of the tenor bell alone, Queen Camel is the heaviest six in the world by total weight (all the bells combined).

The interior contains memorials to many of the Mildmay family, who were Lords of the manor. There is a wooden rood screen and octagonal stone font supported by four large carved supports.

The churchyard contains a Commonwealth war grave of a Royal Navy seaman of World War I.

The parish is part of the Cam Vale benefice, which includes Corton Denham, Sparkford, Sutton Montis, West Camel and Weston Bampfylde, within the Bruton and Cary deanery.

== See also ==
- Grade I listed buildings in South Somerset
- List of Somerset towers
- List of ecclesiastical parishes in the Diocese of Bath and Wells
