= West Camel =

Village and civil parish in Somerset, England

Coordinates: 51.0220°N 2.6019°W

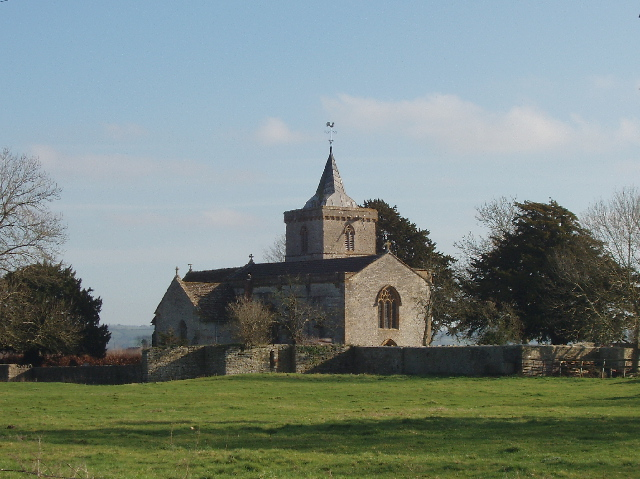
- Church of All Saints, West Camel

- Location within Somerset
- Population: 459 (2011)
- OS grid reference: ST578249
- Unitary authority: Somerset Council
- Ceremonial county: Somerset
- Region: South West
- Country: England
- Sovereign state: United Kingdom
- Post town: YEOVIL
- Postcode district: BA22
- Dialling code: 01935
- Police: Avon and Somerset
- Fire: Devon and Somerset
- Ambulance: South Western
- UK Parliament: Glastonbury and Somerton

West Camel is a village and civil parish in south Somerset, England, about 7 miles (11.3 km) north of the town of Yeovil. It lies either side of the River Cam, just south of the A303, and has a population of 459. The parish includes the hamlet of Urgashay. Neighbouring villages include Queen Camel, and Bridgehampton.

== Toponymy ==
The name of Camel derives not from the animal, but from the Common Brittonic language. The name is first attested in charters of the mid-tenth century (surviving in a thirteenth-century copy), as Cantmel; in the original manuscript of a charter of 995, as Cantmæl; and in the Domesday Book of 1086 as Camel and Camelle. It derives from the Brittonic words found today in modern Welsh as cant ("enclosure, circle, rim") and moel ("bare"). Thus the name once meant "bare ridge" or something similar. The name is first attested with the addition of West in 1291, as Wescammel. This element was introduced to distinguish West Camel from nearby Queen Camel. The village was also known as Camel Abbatis ("Abbot's Camel") for its association with Muchelney Abbey.

== History ==
Camel is one of many sites in England identified as a possible setting of The Strife of Camlann, related as the final battle of King Arthur.

The earliest evidence of a settlement dates from before AD 940: remains of a Saxon preaching cross. The parish of West Camel later became part of the Hundred of Somerton.

The earliest written reference to West Camel dates from 995 CE, in the form of a grant of the village by Aethelred II to the monks of Muchelney Abbey. Produce exacted for the abbey grange was held in an extant 15th-century tithe barn.

Earthworks 100 and 250 metres north of Downhead Manor Farm show the early site of houses, possibly including a manor house, tracks and a fishpond. Though it had existed since before the Norman Conquest, this settlement had been abandoned by the late 18th century.

Running through West Camel is the Leland Trail, a 28 miles (45.1 km) footpath that follows in the footsteps of John Leland, as he traversed across South Somerset in 1535–1543, during his investigations of the district's antiquities. The Leland Trail begins at King Alfred's Tower on the Wiltshire/Somerset border and ends at Ham Hill Country Park.

=== 1955 mid-air collision ===
A RAF Sabre and a Sea Hawk collided on 17 August 1955. Wreckage landed over the village. North American F-86 Sabre 'XB700', was from 26 Sqn at Oldenburg Air Base The Sea Hawk 'WM964' was piloted by Joseph M Margoliouth, aged 22. Two pilots were killed, one parachuted.

== Governance ==
The parish council has responsibility for local issues, including setting an annual precept (local rate) to cover the council's operating costs and producing annual accounts for public scrutiny. As elsewhere, the parish council evaluates local planning applications and works with the local police, district council officers, and neighbourhood watch groups on crime, security, and traffic. Its role also includes initiating projects for maintaining and repairing parish facilities, and consulting with the district council on the maintenance, repair and improvement of highways, drainage, footpaths, public transport and street cleaning. Conservation matters (including trees and listed buildings) and environmental issues are also within its responsibility.

For local government purposes, since 1 April 2023, the parish comes under the unitary authority of Somerset Council. Prior to this, it was part of the non-metropolitan district of South Somerset (established under the Local Government Act 1972). It was part of Yeovil Rural District before 1974.

The village belongs to the Glastonbury and Somerton county constituency represented in the House of Commons. It elects one Member of Parliament (MP) by the first-past-the-post system of election.

== Religious sites ==
The Church of All Saints dates from the late 14th century. It is a Grade I listed building. Its rectory dates from the early 15th century. The older wing may form part of the Grange pertaining to Muchelney Abbey; the south wing was probably added by Rev. Henry Law between 1824 and 1836.

== Notable residents ==
- Richard Amerike (c. 1445–1503) was a wealthy English-born merchant, Royal customs officer and Sheriff of Welsh descent. He was principal owner of John Cabot's ship Matthew during a voyage of exploration to North America in 1497.
- Elizabeth Benger (1775–1827), poet, novelist, and biographer of Anne Boleyn, was baptised here on 15 June 1775.
