= Church of All Saints, West Camel =

Church in Somerset, England

Church of All Saints
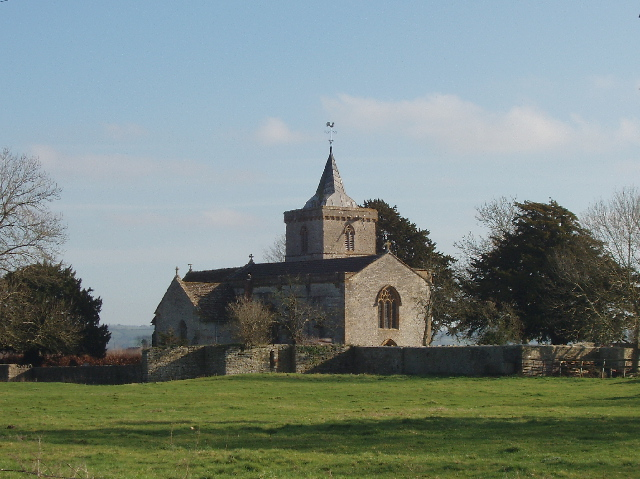

- Location within Somerset
- 51°01′06″N 2°35′53″W
- Location: West Camel, Somerset, England

History
- Built: 14th century

Listed Building – Grade I
- Official name: Church of All Saints
- Designated: 19 April 1961
- Reference no.: 1056769

The Church of All Saints in West Camel, Somerset, England, dates from the late 14th century and has been designated as a Grade I listed building.

There had been a previous wooden church on the site since 995 until around 1100 when it was replaced by a small stone Norman church, which was added to over subsequent centuries. The first church may have been founded by Muchelney Abbey.

The tie-beam roof of the nave dates from the 15th century. The tower holds six bells the oldest of which was cast in the 15th century. The church underwent extensive Victorian restoration in the 1860s.

The parish is part of the Cam Vale benefice within the Bruton and Cary deanery.

== See also ==
- Grade I listed buildings in South Somerset
- List of Somerset towers
- List of ecclesiastical parishes in the Diocese of Bath and Wells
