= Graham Phillips (writer) =

British author (born 1953)

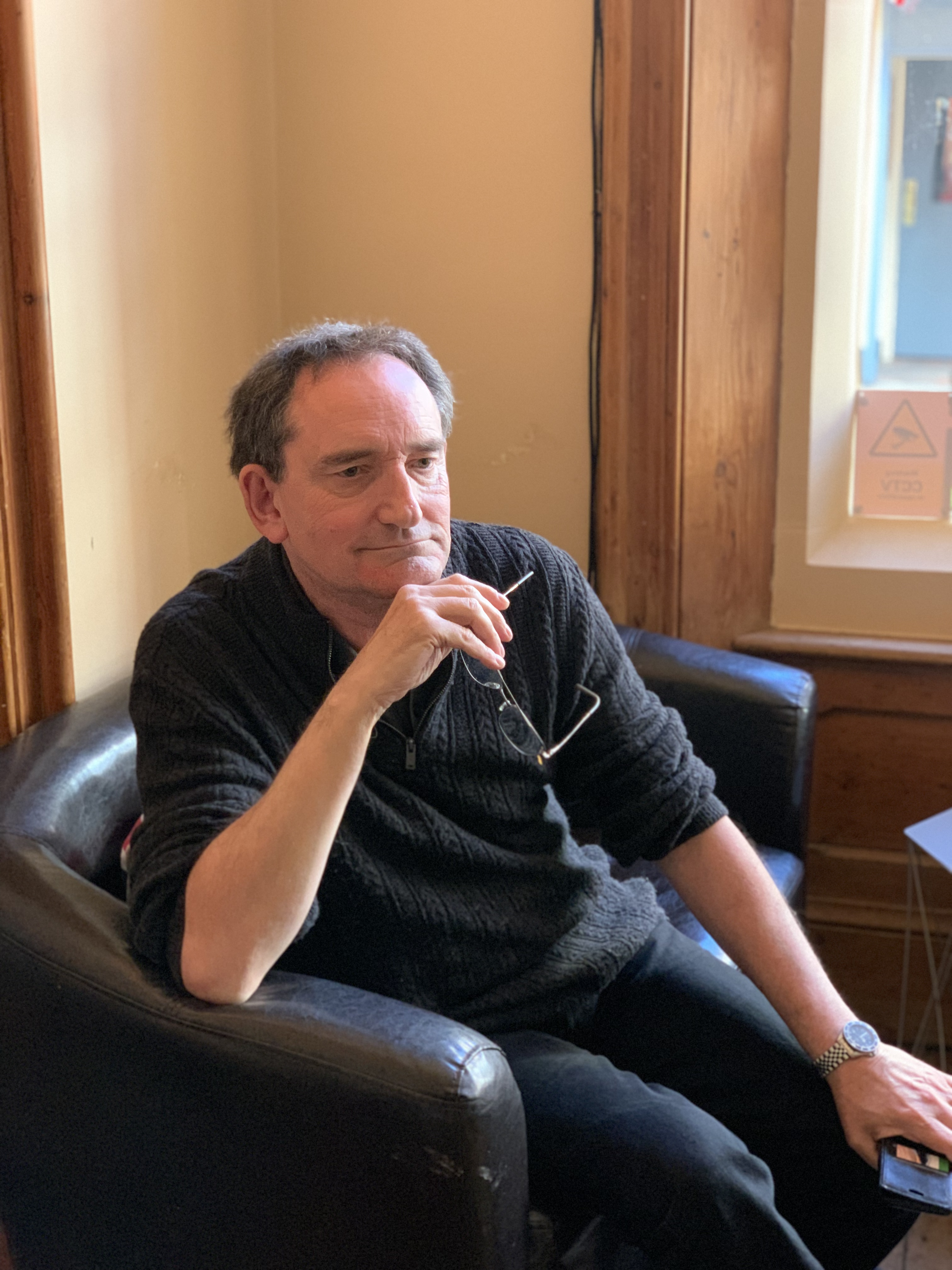
- Graham Phillips in 2021
- Born: 1953 (age 72–73)
- Occupation: Writer
- Years active: 1983-present

Graham Phillips is a British author. Phillips has a background working as a reporter for BBC radio, and he was the founding editor (1979) of Strange Phenomena magazine. He has made a number of controversial claims concerning the Arthurian legend, such as the discovery of the 'Hawkstone Grail', a small stone cup that he claims is the original Holy Grail; the identification of a Roman ruin as the "historical Camelot"; and the claim to have discovered King Arthur's grave. He has also investigated various biblical mysteries, again presenting some controversial theories, such as an alternative location for Mount Sinai at Petra in Jordan, an Egyptian staff in a British museum as the staff of Moses, and a grave on the British island of Anglesey as the tomb of the Virgin Mary.

== Books ==
=== With Martin Keatman ===
- The Green Stone. Neville Spearman, 1983. ISBN 0-85978-060-0. Documents the authors' search for a hidden jewel rumoured to have belonged to Mary Queen of Scots.
- The Eye of Fire. C.W. Daniel, 1986. ISBN 978-0-85207-172-4. An investigation into a Victorian secret society and the search for an ancient talisman they are said to have possessed.
- King Arthur: The True Story. Century, 1992. ISBN 978-0-7126-5580-4. Researches the origins of the King Arthur myth, concluding that Arthur was Owain Danwyn, an historical fifth-century warlord from the English Midlands.
- The Shakespeare Conspiracy. Century, 1994. ISBN 978-0-7126-5883-6. Examines the evidence concerning the private life of William Shakespeare and proposes that the playwright worked as a spy for the Protestant government of Queen Elizabeth I.
- Robin Hood: The Man Behind the Myth. Michael O'Mara, 1995. ISBN 978-1-85479-996-8. Suggests that the legendary outlaw may have been a composite character based on three separate historical figures.

=== Solo ===
- The Search for the Grail. Century, 1995. ISBN 978-0-7126-7533-8. Proposes that the medieval Grail romances were based on the legend of a jar that was said to have belonged to Jesus' follower Mary Magdalene.
  - Reissued as: The Chalice of Magdalene. Bear & Company, 2004. ISBN 1-59143-038-0.
- Act of God. Sidgwick & Jackson, 1998. ISBN 978-0-283-06314-5. Investigates the biblical accounts of the Exodus, concluding that the plagues of Egypt and the parting of the Red Sea were real historical events caused by a volcanic eruption.
  - Reissued as: Atlantis and the Ten Plagues of Egypt. Bear & Company, 2003. ISBN 978-1-59143-009-4.
- The Marian Conspiracy. Sidgwick & Jackson, 2000. ISBN 978-0-283-06341-1. Examines the historical evidence concerning the life of the Virgin Mary and proposes that the true location of her tomb was kept secret by the Vatican.
  - Reissued as: The Virgin Mary Conspiracy. Bear & Company, 2005. ISBN 1-59143-043-7.
- The Moses Legacy. Sidgwick & Jackson, 2002. ISBN 978-0-283-07315-1. Explores the origins of Judaism by examining the historical and archaeological evidence concerning the period of the Old Testament.
  - Reissued as: 12 Tribes, 10 Plagues and the 2 Men who were Moses. Ulysses Press, 2003. ISBN 1-56975-355-5.
- Alexander the Great: Murder in Babylon. Virgin Publishing, 2004. ISBN 978-1-85227-134-3. Investigates the mystery of Alexander's death, concluding that he was poisoned by his wife Roxanne.
- The Templars and the Ark of the Covenant. Bear & Company, 2004. ISBN 978-1-59143-039-1. An account of the author's search for the biblical Ark of the Covenant by following a trail of clues purportedly left by the Knights Templars during the Middle Ages.
- Merlin and the Discovery of Avalon in the New World. Bear & Company, 2005. ISBN 978-1-59143-047-6. Proposes that the Arthurian Merlin was based on an historical figure who sailed to America a thousand years before Columbus.
- The End of Eden. Bear & Company, 2007. ISBN 978-1-59143-069-8. Advocates that a comet impact around 1500 BCE was responsible for the simultaneous collapse of various civilisations around the world.
- The Lost Tomb of King Arthur. Bear & Company, 2016. ISBN 978-1-59143-181-7. Details the author's journey to uncover the final resting place of the historical King Arthur.
- Wisdomkeepers of Stonehenge. Bear & Company, 2019. ISBN 978-1-59143-297-5. Proposes that Stonehenge was an ancient astronomical calendar to determine the precise time to plant and harvest medicinal plants.
- The Mystery of Doggerland. Bear & Company, 2023. ISBN 978-1-59143-423-8. Explores the origins of the stone-circle-building culture in the ancient British Isles, suggesting that it may have started on islands north of Scotland.

== Documentaries and television appearances ==
Phillips has worked twice with British TV personality Tony Robinson and appeared in his documentaries Robin Hood: Fact or Fiction (2003) and The Real Da Vinci Code (2005), and with historian Michael Wood: In Search of Myths and Heroes: King Arthur (2005). He has made two guest appearances on Britain's Channel Four show Richard & Judy: The Templars and the Ark of the Covenant (2004), and King Arthur: The True Story (2005). His investigations featured in two documentaries on the National Geographic Channel: The Hunt for the Lost Ark (2005), and Is it Real?: King Arthur (2007). Phillips's search for the lost Ark was the subject of an episode of the Travel Channel and History Channel's series Legend Hunters ("The Ark of the Covenant", 2007), as was his investigation into the Grail legend (The Holy Grail, 2004). Phillips's search for the Holy Grail formed part of the Lucasfilm documentary Indiana Jones and the Ultimate Quest about real-life Indiana Jones type researchers which accompanied the release of the movie Indiana Jones and the Kingdom of the Crystal Skull in 2008. His research into the Grail and Camelot legend featured in the Travel Channel's Weird Travels 2006 series (Weird Travels: The Quest for the Holy Grail). And his investigations into the secret life of William Shakespeare and the Grail legend formed part of the Discovery Channel's Puzzles of the Past 2001 series ("Master Spies" and "Holy Relics").

In 2015, Phillips took part in a TV documentary regarding the Staff of Moses. Between 2014 and 2020, Phillips was featured in Forbidden History with Jamie Theakston as author and historian, attempting to solve biblical mysteries pertaining to Moses, King Arthur, and The Holy Grail. Between 2013 and 2023, Phillips featured in eighteen episodes of the History Channel's Ancient Aliens as an investigative journalist and expert. Phillips also featured on another History Channel show, The UnXplained in seven episodes as an expert between 2021 and 2024. His research into the Holy Grail mystery was featured in the History Channel's History's Greatest Mysteries in 2022.
