= Liberty Trail =

Footpath in Somerset and Dorset, England

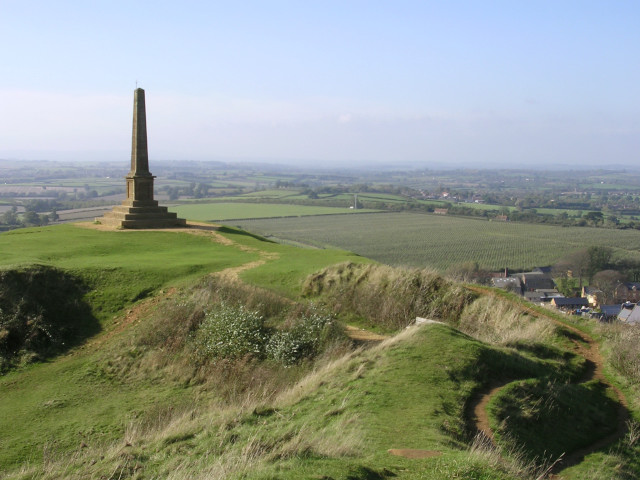
- The War Memorial at Ham Hill
- Length: 28 mi (45 km)
- Location: Somerset and Dorset
- Trailheads: Ham Hill Country Park, Lyme Regis, Dorset
- Use: Hiking

The Liberty Trail is a 28-mile (45.1 km) trail between Ham Hill in Somerset and Lyme Regis in Dorset, England.

== History ==
The route of the Liberty Trail route is based on information recorded by six rebels from various villages in Somerset and Dorset. Villagers from the two counties made their way to join the Protestant Monmouth Rebellion in 1685. The rebels wore green sprigs tucked into their hats to declare their support for the Duke of Monmouth. Weapons that they carried included farm scythes and other suitable agricultural tools.

== Route ==
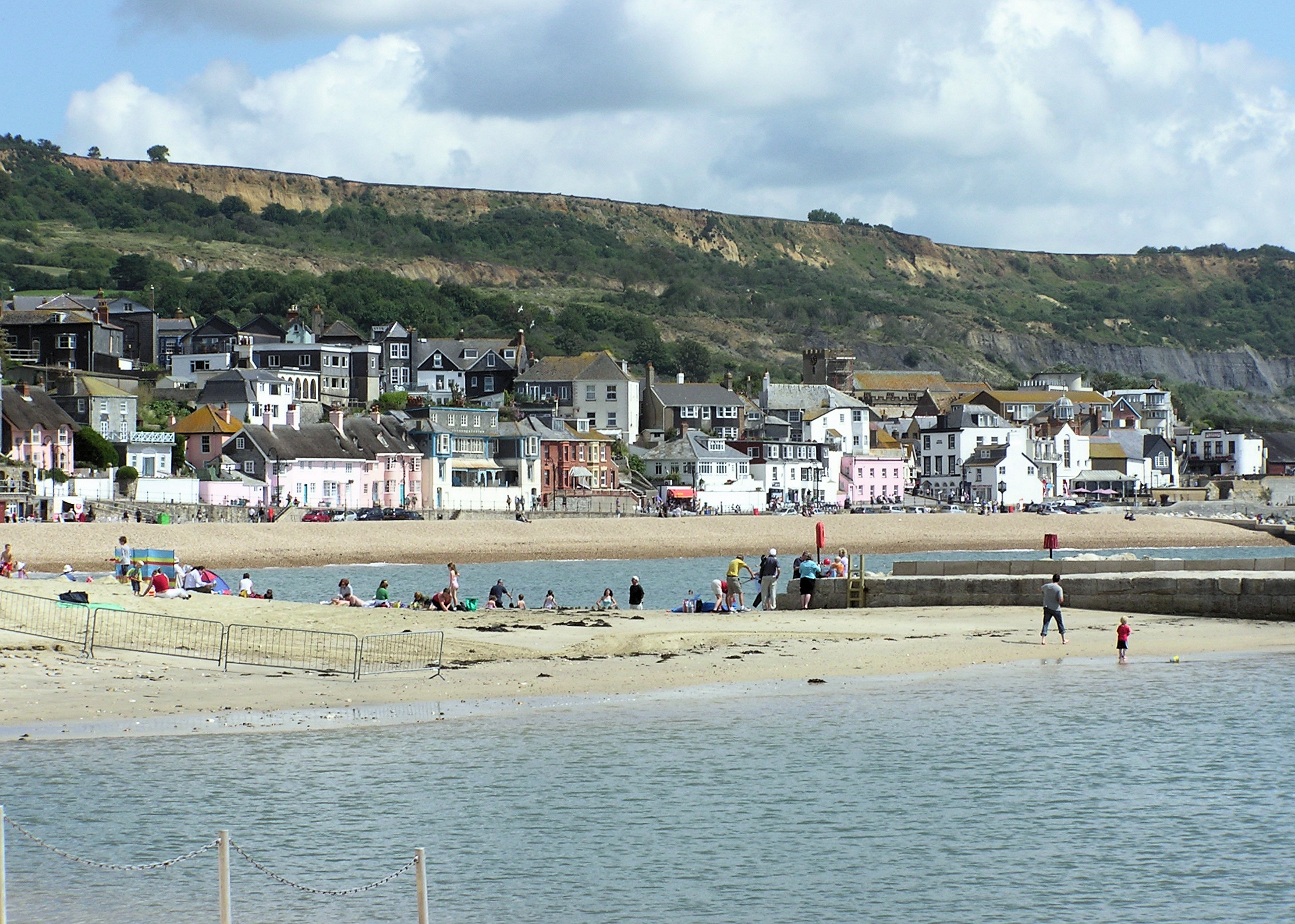
Lyme Regis from the Cobb.

Ham Hill is 397 feet (121 m) at its highest point, and Lyme Regis is at sea level.

Below are six possible walking stages that may be used to traverse the Liberty Trail:

- Ham Hill to West Chinnock - 3.5 miles (5.6 km) - 1.75 hours
- West Chinnock to Misterton - 5 miles (8.0 km) - 2.5 hours
- Misterton to Wayford - 4 miles (6.4 km) - 2 hours
- Wayford to Thorncombe - 6 miles (9.7 km) - 3 hours
- Thorncombe to Wootton Fitzpaine - 5.5 miles (8.9 km) - 2.75 hours
- Wootton Fitzpaine to Lyme Regis - 4 miles (6.4 km) - 2 hours

== Places of interest ==
At Ham Hill there are links with other Trails including the Monarch's Way, Leland Trail and River Parrett Trail. Ham Hill Iron Age Hill Fort is one of the largest in Europe. Many local buildings are made from the local yellow Hamstone. At Wayford is Clapton Court Gardens, one of Somerset's more historic gardens that are open to the public. Forde Abbey is situated on a curved section of the River Axe, its original purpose was as a Cistercian Monastery. It has a garden of some elegance which has won many awards. At this location the Dorset Jubilee Trail crosses over the path of the Liberty Trail. Two other Iron Age Hill Forts may be seen at this stage, the first one is Lambert's Castle and further on is Coney's Castle. During clear weather conditions Chesil Beach and Portland Bill are visible, both are famous features of this part of the South coast of England. Lyme Regis is located to the west of Chesil Beach on the Jurassic Coast, a place where many fossils may be found. The Cobb at Lyme Regis was the location for The French Lieutenant's Woman (film) in 1981. The South West Coast Path also leads into this part of the town.

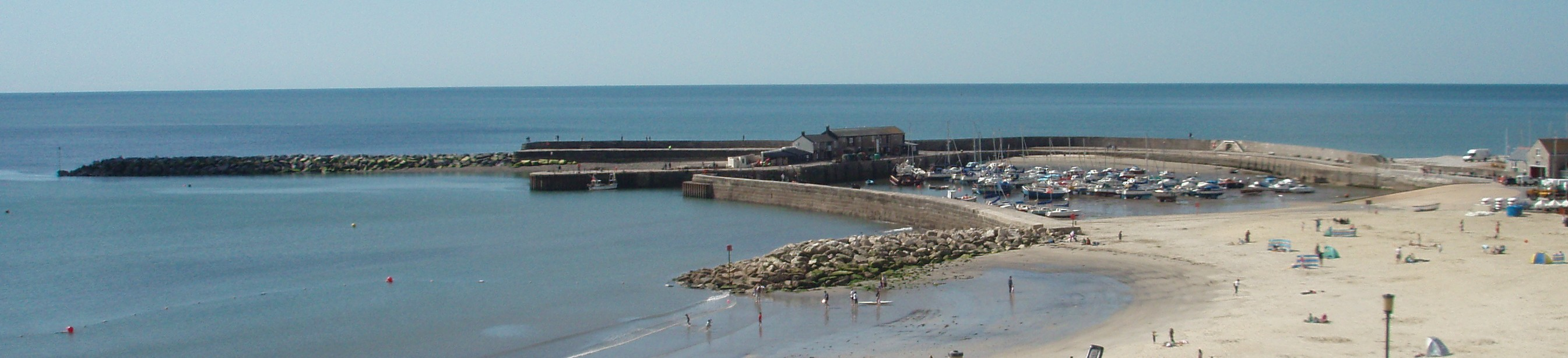
The Cobb, with boats grounded in the harbour at low tide.

Sections of the Liberty Trail also form part of other trails in the area, such as the Macmillan Way West, River Parrett Trail, Wessex Ridgeway.

Further detail of the Liberty Trail is available from Yeovil Tourist Information Centre and South Somerset Tourist Information.

== Way points and maps ==
Point	Coordinates (Links to map resources)	OS Grid Ref	Notes
Start	50.950°N 2.743°W	ST478170	Ham Hill, Somerset
Way Point	50.919°N 2.757°W	ST468135	West Chinnock, Somerset
Way Point	50.870°N 2.773°W	ST456081	Misterton, Somerset
Way Point	50.856°N 2.840°W	ST409067	Wayford, Somerset
Way Point	50.826°N 2.886°W	ST376033	Thorncombe, Dorset
Way Point	50.757°N 2.899°W	SY366957	Wootton Fitzpaine, Dorset
End	50.724°N 2.933°W	SY341920	Lyme Regis, Dorset

Ordnance Survey Explorer map series:- 129 - Yeovil & Sherborne (Sherbourne), :- 116 - Lyme Regis & Bridport, provide the geographical details for this trail.
