= Corton Denham =

Village and civil parish in Somerset, England

Coordinates: 51.0007°N 2.5215°W

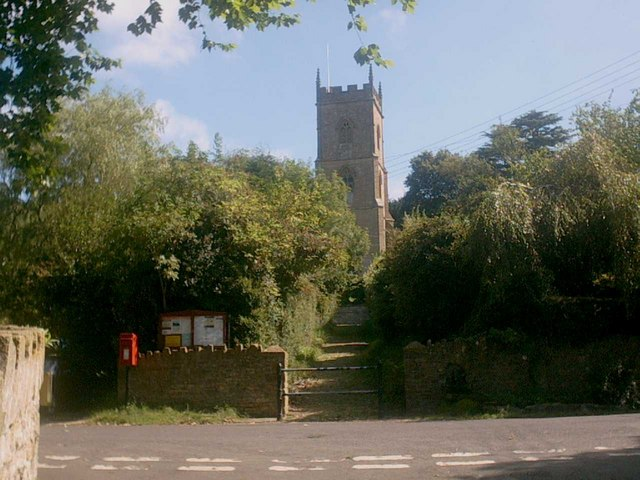
- Corton Denham Church

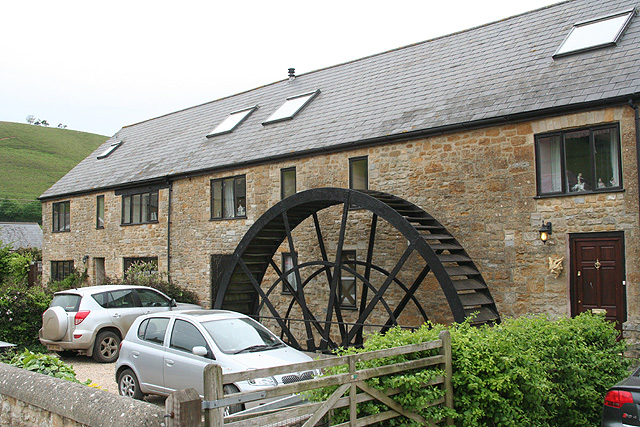
- Waterwheel at Whitcombe Farm

- Location within Somerset
- Population: 189 (2011)
- OS grid reference: ST635225
- Unitary authority: Somerset Council
- Ceremonial county: Somerset
- Region: South West
- Country: England
- Sovereign state: United Kingdom
- Post town: SHERBORNE
- Postcode district: DT9
- Dialling code: 01963
- Police: Avon and Somerset
- Fire: Devon and Somerset
- Ambulance: South Western
- UK Parliament: Glastonbury and Somerton

Corton Denham is a village and parish in Somerset, England, situated seven miles north east of Yeovil. The village has a population of 189.

== History ==
The village was named Corfetone in the Domesday Book of 1086, coming from the Old English meaning the settlement in a cutting. The second part of the name comes from the Dynham (later Dynham) family who held the manor from the 12th century until 1509.

The parish was part of the hundred of Horethorne.

In the 19th century an iron waterwheel was installed at Whitcombe Farmhouse.

== Governance ==
The parish council has responsibility for local issues, including setting an annual precept (local rate) to cover the council's operating costs.

For local government purposes, since 1 April 2023, the parish comes under the unitary authority of Somerset Council. Prior to this, it was part of the non-metropolitan district of South Somerset (established under the Local Government Act 1972). It was part of Wincanton Rural District before 1974.

It is also part of the Glastonbury and Somerton county constituency represented in the House of Commons of the Parliament of the United Kingdom. It elects one Member of Parliament (MP) by the first past the post system of election.

== Religious sites ==
The parish Church of St Andrew was rebuilt 1869–1870.

== Notable residents ==
Former Blue Peter presenter Valerie Singleton lived in the village.

Rear Admiral Godfrey Place is buried in the village.
