= Church of St Mary, Rimpton =

Church in Somerset, England

Church of St Mary
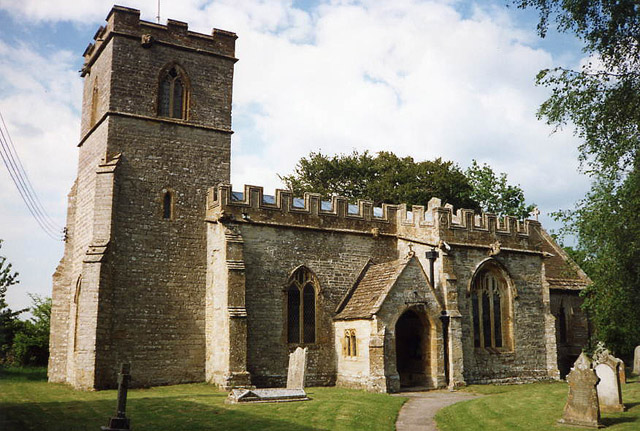

- Location within Somerset
- 50°59′39″N 2°33′18″W
- Location: Rimpton, Somerset, England

History
- Built: 13th century

Listed Building – Grade I
- Official name: Church of Saint Mary
- Designated: 19 April 1961
- Reference no.: 1295576

The Church of St Mary in Rimpton, Somerset, England was built in the early 13th century and has been designated as a Grade I listed building.

The exact date of the building of the church is uncertain. It was before 1291 but some payments to the church had been made in 1215 or earlier.

The stone building consists of a chancel, nave with an 18th-century north transept and vestry, and a south chapel, which was added in the 15th century. The interior includes a 15th-century font with a 17th-century cover. The pulpit is from the 17th century. The west tower contains three bells the oldest of which was cast in 1657 by Robert Austen.

The parish is part of the benefice of Chilton Cantelo, Ashington, Mudford, Rimpton and Mudford within the yeovil deanery.

== See also ==
- Grade I listed buildings in South Somerset
- List of Somerset towers
- List of ecclesiastical parishes in the Diocese of Bath and Wells
