= Queen Camel =

Village and civil parish in Somerset, England

Coordinates: 51.0203°N 2.5780°W

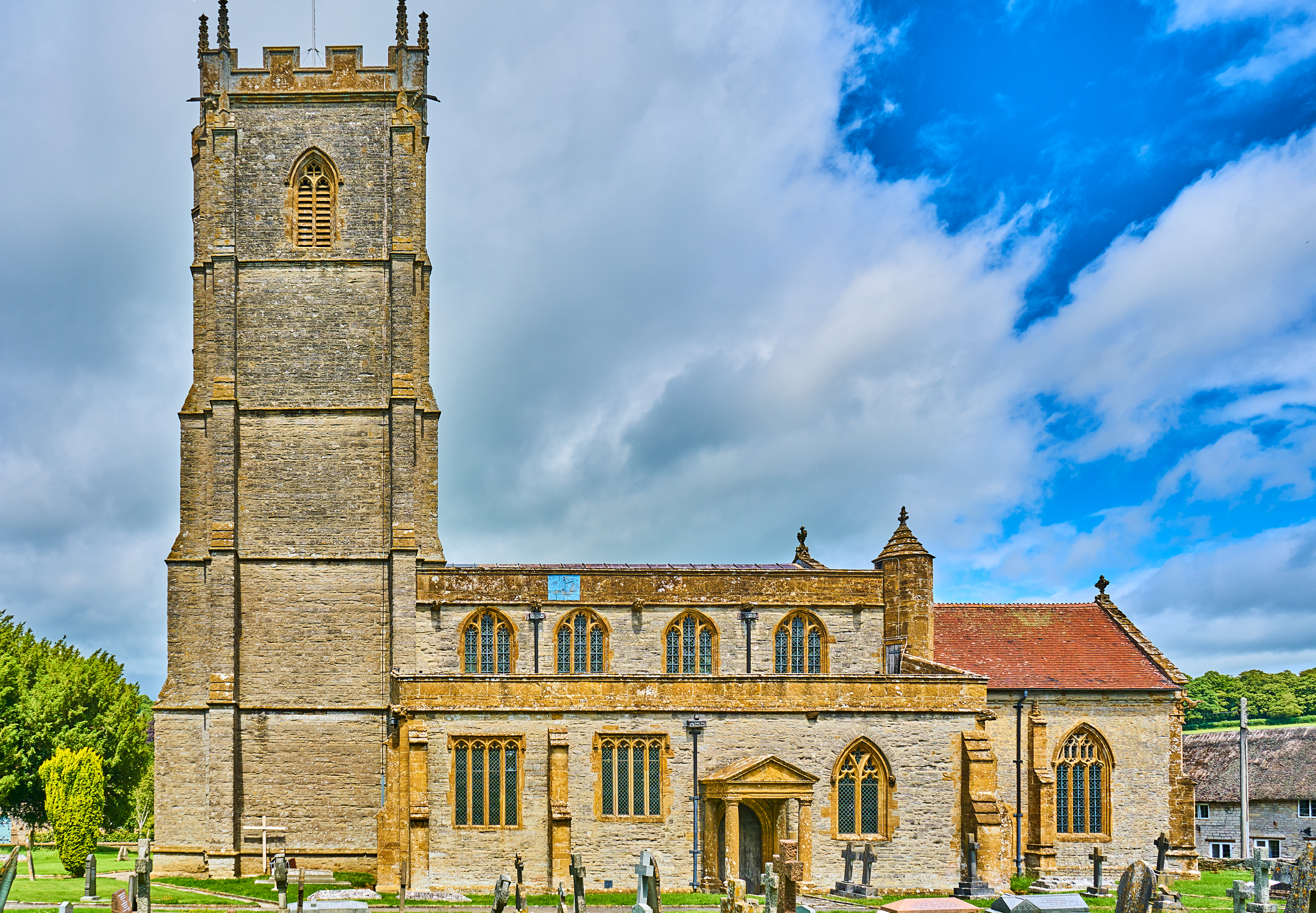
- St Barnabas Church

- Location within Somerset
- Population: 908 (2011)
- OS grid reference: ST595247
- Unitary authority: Somerset Council
- Ceremonial county: Somerset
- Region: South West
- Country: England
- Sovereign state: United Kingdom
- Post town: YEOVIL
- Postcode district: BA22
- Dialling code: 01935
- Police: Avon and Somerset
- Fire: Devon and Somerset
- Ambulance: South Western
- UK Parliament: Glastonbury and Somerton

Queen Camel is a village and civil parish, on the River Cam and the A359 road, in the unitary authority of Somerset, England. It is about 7 miles (11.3 km) north of Yeovil. According to the 2011 census it had a population of 908. The parish includes the hamlet of Wales. Nearby places are West Camel, Sparkford and Marston Magna.

== Toponymy ==
The name of Camel derives not from the animal, but from the Common Brittonic language. The name is first attested in charters of the mid-tenth century (surviving in a thirteenth-century copy), as Cantmel; in the original manuscript of a charter of 995, as Cantmæl; and in the Domesday Book of 1086 as Camel and Camelle. It derives from the Brittonic words found today in modern Welsh as cant ("enclosure, circle, rim") and moel ("bare"). Thus the name once meant "bare ridge" or something similar. The name is first attested with the addition of Queen in 1280, in the Latin form Camel Reginæ. This element was introduced to distinguish Queen Camel from nearby West Camel and probably arises from Edward I's donation of the estate to his wife Eleanor of Castile.

== History ==
The site of a Romano-British settlement has been identified south west of Camel Hill Farm, which was occupied in the 2nd to 4th centuries. Stone foundations of at least three buildings have been identified.

Some historians, including John Leland, believe the area surrounding the village to be the site of the final battle of King Arthur, the Battle of Camlann.

In the tenth century, land in Camel was granted away by the kings Edmund I, Eadwig and Edgar the Peaceful, but by the time of the Norman Conquest in 1066 it was held by Gytha of Wessex, after whom the village school, which opened in 1873, is named. In 1202 the manor was granted to Hubert de Burgh, by King John, who gave it to the monks of Cleeve Abbey. It later returned to the crown and in 1275 was known as Camel Regis. In 1558 it was granted to Sir Walter Mildmay, whose family retained it until 1929.

The parish was part of the hundred of Catsash.

The Mildmay family lived at Hazlegrove House, a substantial 17th-century house which was largely rebuilt by Carew Mildmay in 1730. It later became Hazlegrove Preparatory School, the junior school of King's School, Bruton.

A fire in 1634 destroyed 70 properties in the village.

== Governance ==
The parish council has responsibility for local issues, including setting an annual precept (local rate) to cover the council's operating costs and producing annual accounts for public scrutiny. The parish council evaluates local planning applications and works with the local police, district council officers, and neighbourhood watch groups on matters of crime, security, and traffic. The parish council's role also includes initiating projects for the maintenance and repair of parish facilities, as well as consulting with the district council on the maintenance, repair, and improvement of highways, drainage, footpaths, public transport, and street cleaning. Conservation matters (including trees and listed buildings) and environmental issues are also the responsibility of the council.

The village fell within the non-metropolitan district of South Somerset, which was formed on 1 April 1974 under the Local Government Act 1972, having previously been part of Wincanton Rural District. The district council was responsible for local planning and building control, local roads, council housing, environmental health, markets and fairs, refuse collection and recycling, cemeteries and crematoria, leisure services, parks, and tourism. On 1 April 2023 the South Somerset district along with others in the county were abolished and a new unitary authority, Somerset Council replaced them. This now provides all services formerly provided by both the districts and the former County Council.

Queen Camel is part of the electoral ward of Camelot. This ward stretches from Sparkford in the north east through Marston Magna to Rimpton in the south. The total population of the ward as at the 2011 census was 2,742.

It is also part of the Glastonbury and Somerton county constituency represented in the House of Commons of the Parliament of the United Kingdom. It elects one Member of Parliament (MP) by the first past the post system of election.

== Landmarks ==
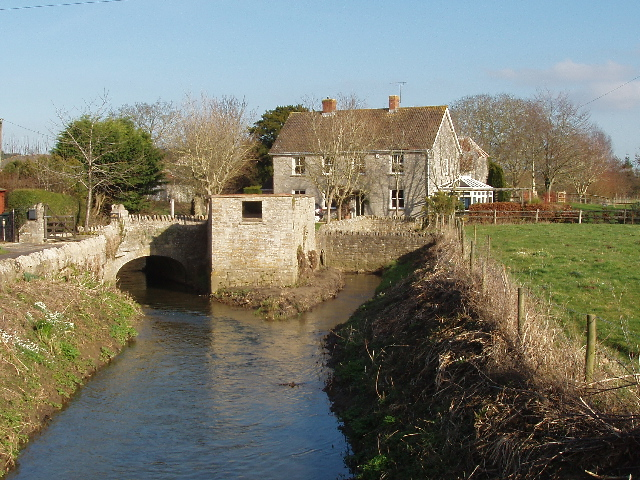
The old mill and bridge over the River Cam

The Wales and Camel Bridges over the River Cam date from the 18th century, although one may be a rebuilding of an older packhorse bridge. It is 38 inches (970 mm) wide and has a total span of 15 feet (4.6 m).

The 17th-century Wales farmhouse and a row of 15th-century cottages are near the Wales bridge. There is one shop that provides all of the villages needs.

== Religious sites ==
The Church of St Barnabas, reached from a cobbled lane, has a lofty tower, built in five stages. The church houses the second heaviest set of six bells in Europe. The Anglican parish church dates from the 14th century with the first recorded rector being in 1317. It contains memorials to many of the Mildmay family. It has been designated as a Grade I listed building.
