= King Alfred's Tower =

Folly tower in Somerset, England

Alfred's Tower
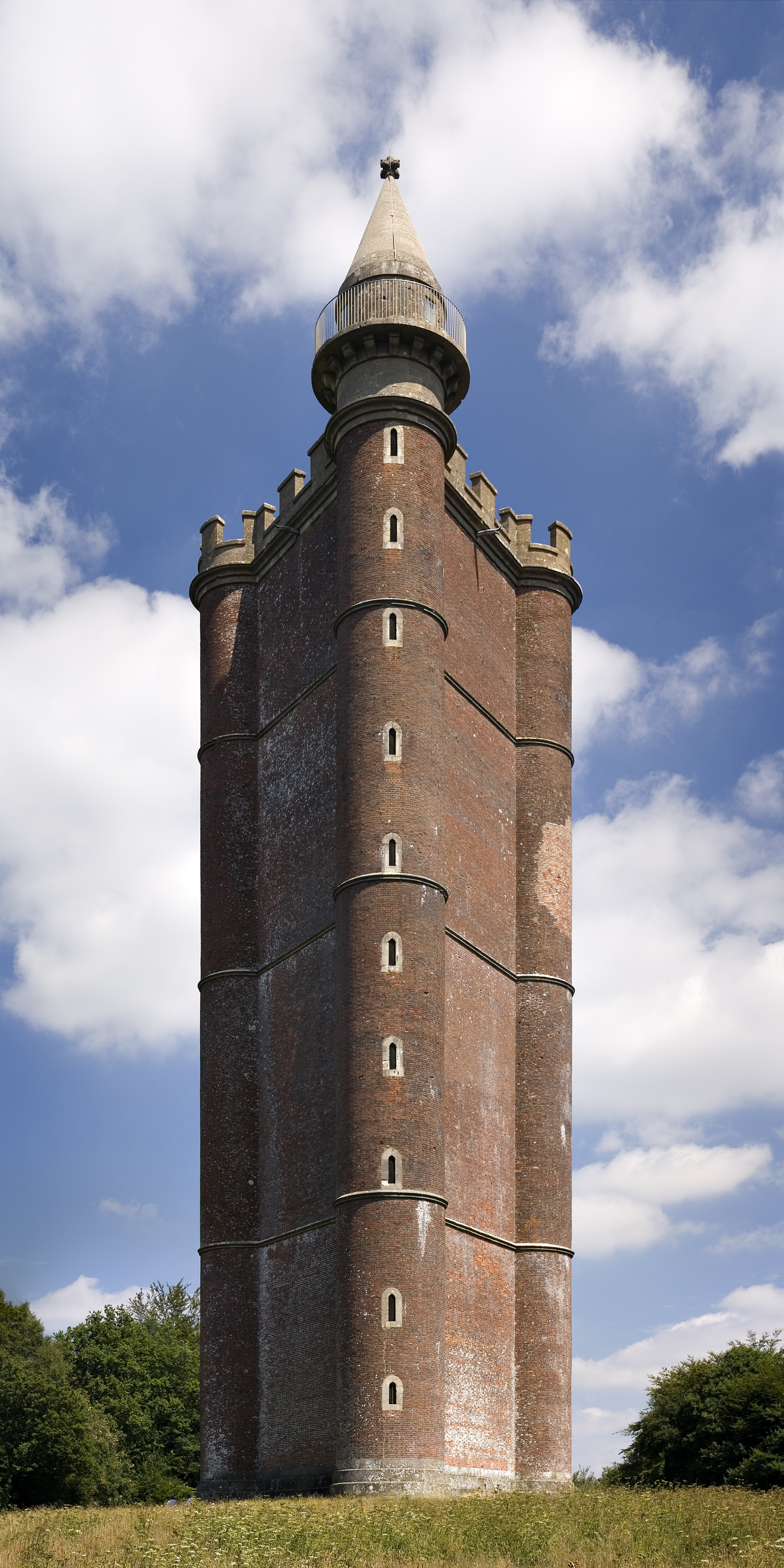
- Alfred's Tower, August 2006

- Location within Somerset

General information
- Location: Brewham, Somerset, England
- Coordinates: 51°06′53″N 2°21′54″W
- Construction started: 1769
- Completed: 1772
- Client: Henry Hoare

Height
- Height: 49 metres (161 ft)

Design and construction
- Architect: Henry Flitcroft

Alfred's Tower is a folly in Somerset, England, on the edge of the border with Wiltshire, on the Stourhead estate. The tower stands on Kingsettle Hill and belongs to the National Trust. It is designated as a Grade I listed building.

Henry Hoare II planned the tower in the 1760s to commemorate the end of the Seven Years' War against France and the accession of King George III, and it was erected near the site of Egbert's Stone, where it is believed that Alfred the Great, King of Wessex, rallied the Anglo-Saxons in 878 before the Battle of Edington. The tower was damaged by an aeroplane in 1944 and restored in the 1980s.

The 49-metre-high (161 ft) triangular tower has a hollow centre and is climbed by means of a spiral staircase in one of the corner projections. It has a statue of King Alfred and a dedication inscription.

== Location ==
The tower stands near the site of 'Egbert's Stone', where it was said that Alfred the Great, King of Wessex, rallied the Saxons in May 878 before the important Battle of Edington (historically known as the battle of Ethandun), where the Danish army, led by Guthrum the Old, was defeated. It is the start of the Leland Trail, a 45 km (28 mi) footpath which runs south-west to Ham Hill Country Park.

== History ==
The project to build the tower was conceived in 1762 by the banker Henry Hoare II (1705–1785). The tower was intended to commemorate the end of the Seven Years' War against France and the accession of King George III.

Alfred's Tower is a monument to the genius of English landscape, many of whose loveliest haunts it commands, and to a man who certainly deserves to be remembered as among the great benefactors of the English scene.

— Christopher Hussey, Country Life, 11 June 1938.

In 1765, Henry Flitcroft, a Palladian architect, designed the tower. Building began in 1769 or early 1770, and was completed in 1772 at a cost estimated to be between £5,000 and £6,000. There may have been some delay due to difficulty in obtaining the bricks. In addition to the commemorative function, the tower was also intended to serve as an eye-catcher for those touring the parkland of the Stourhead Estate. In April 1770, when the tower was just 4.7 m (15 ft) high, Hoare is quoted as saying: "I hope it will be finished in as happy Times to this Isle as Alfred finished his Life of Glory in then I shall depart in peace."

The tower was damaged in 1944 when a Noorduyn Norseman aeroplane crashed into it in fog, damaging the uppermost 10 m (33 ft); one source states that all five on board were killed. It was designated as a Grade I listed building in 1961. Restoration work in 1986 included the use of a Wessex helicopter to lower a 300 kg (660 lb) piece of masonry onto the top. The statue of King Alfred was also restored at this time, including the replacement of his missing right forearm.

== Architecture ==
The triangular tower is over 40 m (130 ft) high with a girth of 51 m (167 ft). Each of the three corners of the triangular structure has a round projection. The centre of the tower is hollow, and to stop birds from entering the space a mesh has been added at roof level. The viewing platform, which has a crenellated parapet and offers a view over the surrounding countryside, is reached by a 205-step spiral staircase at the corner furthest from the entrance. The brick tower has Chilmark stone dressings and is surmounted by an embattled parapet.

The south-east face of the tower has a Gothic-arched entrance door, a statue of King Alfred, and a stone panel bearing an inscription (see below). This is the face that most visitors see first when walking from Stourhead garden or from the nearby car park.

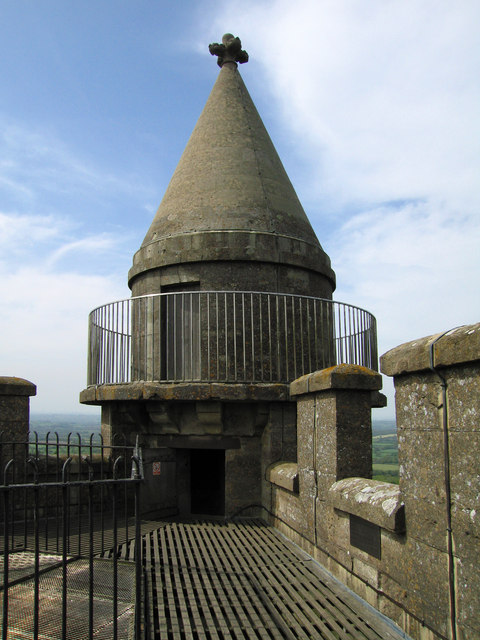
The turret above the stair-tower at the top of the tower

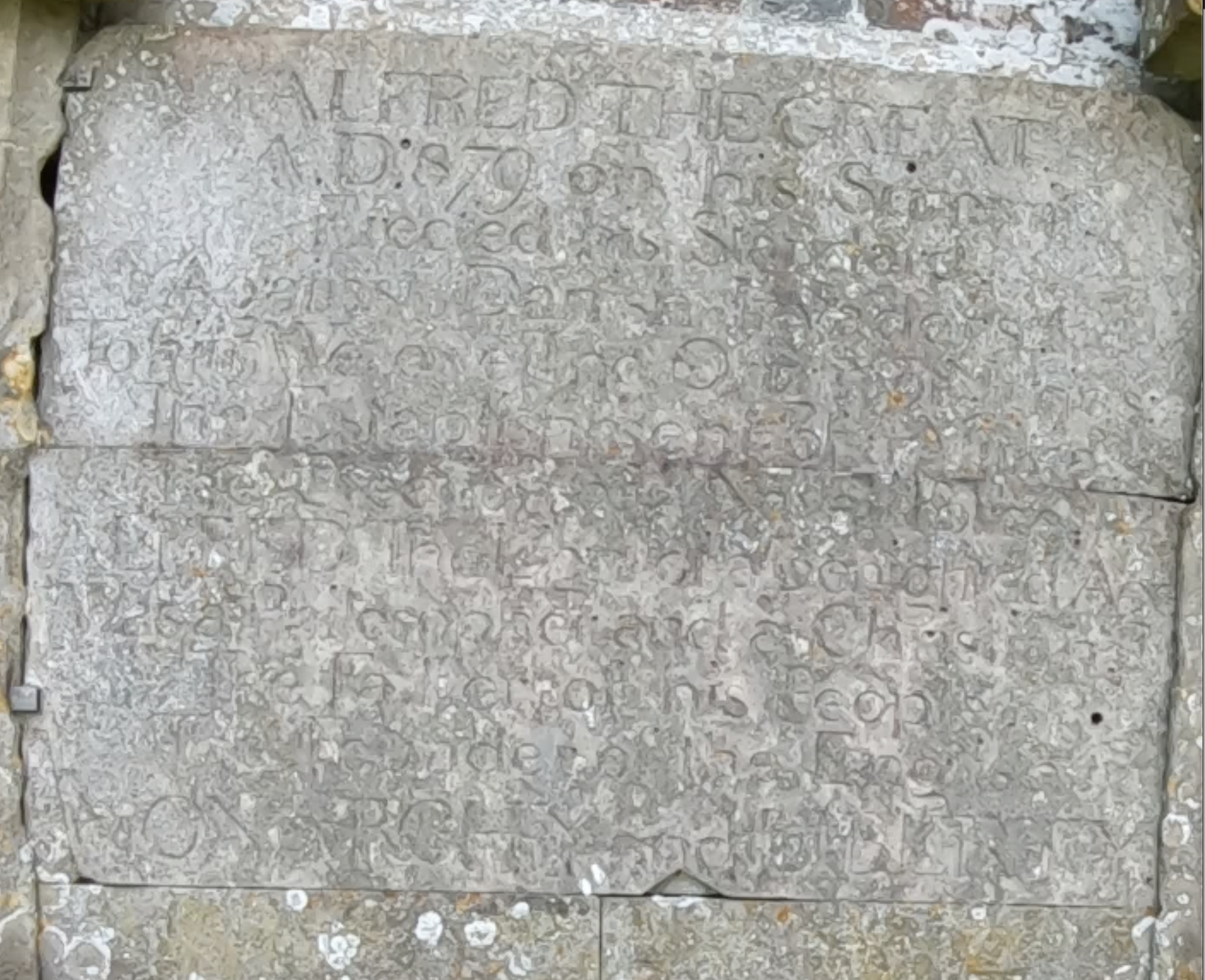
Plaque 8 m (26 ft) above the entrance

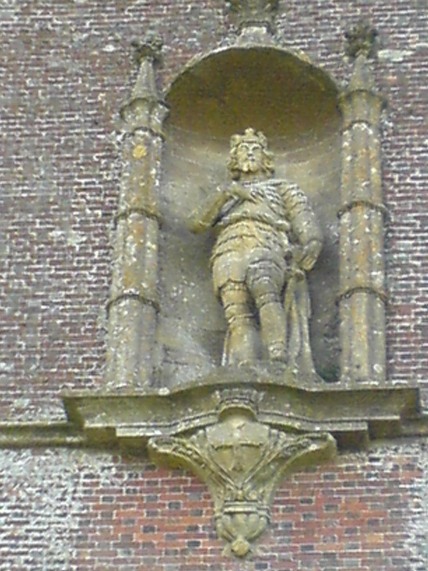
Statue of King Alfred above the entrance

=== Inscription ===
Around the Stourhead estate are several inscriptions. The plaque of the inscription is in poor condition and needs restoration. It was drafted in 1762 and installed in 1772. The stone tablet above the door on the east face of the tower reads:

ALFRED THE GREAT
AD 879 on this Summit
Erected his Standard
Against Danish Invaders
To him We owe The Origin of Juries
The Establishment of a Militia
The Creation of a Naval Force
ALFRED The Light of a Benighted Age
Was a Philosopher and a Christian
The Father of his People
The Founder of the English
MONARCHY and LIBERTY

== In popular culture ==
The tower is mentioned in Thomas Hardy's poem "Channel Firing" (written in April 1914) as a place "far inland".

== See also ==
- Scrabo Tower, County Down
