= Ham Hill, Somerset =

Hill fort and country park in England

Ham Hill
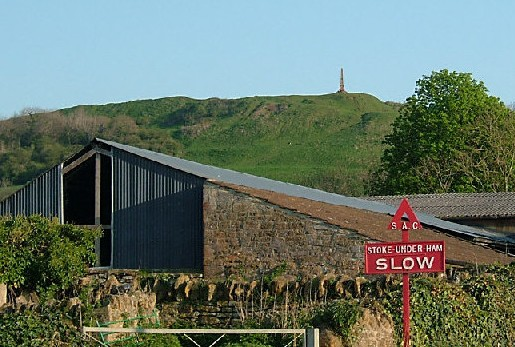
- Ham Hill summit and war memorial seen from Stoke-sub-Hamdon

Highest point
- Elevation: c. 125 m (c. 410 ft)
- Prominence: < 5 m
- Coordinates: 50°57′6″N 2°44′42″W

Geography
- Location: Somerset, England
- OS grid: ST479172
- Topo map: OS Landranger 183

Ham Hill is a geological Site of Special Scientific Interest (SSSI), Scheduled Ancient Monument, Iron Age hill fort, Roman site, Local Nature Reserve and country park, to the west of Yeovil in Somerset, England.

The hill has given its name to the distinctive quarried hamstone and also to two nearby villages: Stoke-sub-Hamdon and Norton Sub Hamdon, whose names mean "under-Ham-hill" (where "Ham" is Old English for a small settlement). The Mendip Hills, Blackdown Hills, Quantock Hills and Dorset Downs are all visible from Ham Hill, especially from its war memorial. It is popular for picnicking, walking and mountain biking in the grassy hollows of the old quarry workings.

The geology supports a wide range of fauna including mammals, birds, invertebrates, reptiles and amphibians living on lichens, fungi, ferns and flowering plants.

== Geology ==
The hill is part of a ridge of sandy limestone rock which is elevated above the lower lying clay vales and nearby Somerset Levels. The sedimentary rocks were laid down in the part of the early Jurassic known as the Toarcian Stage. They are given their colour by the weathering of the iron content of the stone and contain fossils such as the ammonite Dumortieria moorei.

The hamstone is a distinctive honey-coloured building stone which has been used in many local villages and for buildings such as Montacute House and Sherborne Abbey. Extensive old quarry workings have changed the landscape into a warren of stony ridges and grassy hollows. Quarrying has unearthed many important historical artefacts, but also destroyed much of the archaeological context.

11.1 ha of the hill is designated as a geological Site of Special Scientific Interest (SSSI), notified in 1971, due to its particular importance to geologists because of the assemblages of fossils which it contains, the sedimentary features which it displays and the way it relates to other rocks of equivalent age in the close vicinity.

== Ecology ==
Ham Hill is managed as a Local Nature Reserve, under Section 21 of the National Parks and Access to the Countryside Act 1949, because of the rare calcareous grassland which supports a wide variety of plant and animal species and its wild flower meadows and wide open grassland areas such as Witcombe Valley.

Fauna include mammals, birds, invertebrates, reptiles and amphibians while the flora include lichens, fungi, ferns and flowering plants.

== History ==
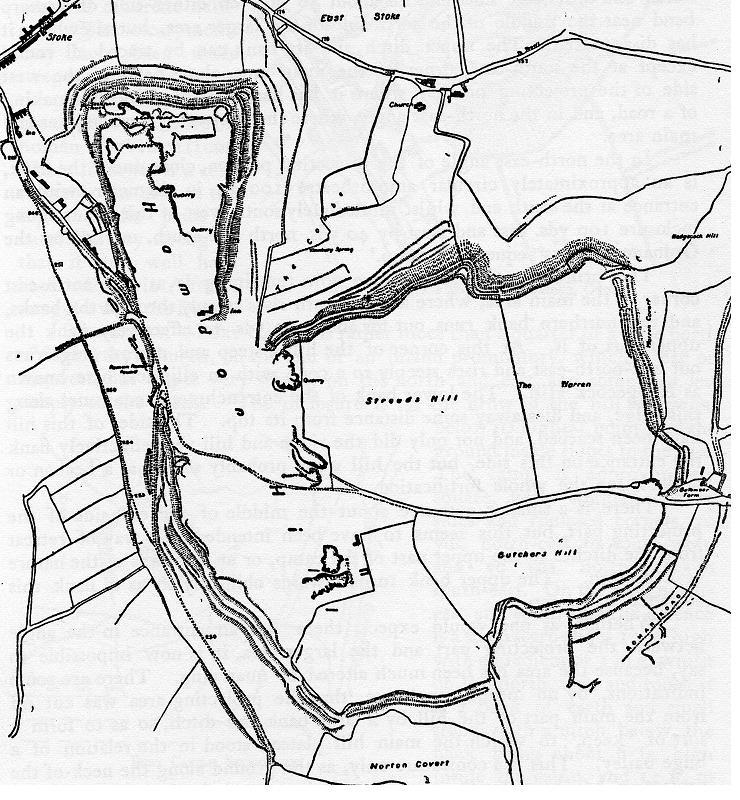
Iron Age hill fort at Ham Hill

The name may come from the Old English ham and hyll giving a meaning of "the settlement hill", however its original name was Hamdon, meaning "the hill among the water meadows". There is evidence of occupation from the Mesolithic and Neolithic periods. Ham Hill is the site of a very large Bronze Age and Iron Age hill fort of the Durotriges tribe, from the 1st century BC. The 3 miles (5 km) ramparts enclose an area of 210 acres (85 ha). Most of the perimeter is a double bank and ditch ("multivallate"). There is a major entrance to the south-east, on the line of the modern road and another to the north-east, following a track from the Church of St Mary the Virgin at East Stoke in Stoke-sub-Hamdon. Archaeological finds include bronzework, chariot parts, iron currency bars, gold and silver coins, cremations and burials.

The hill was captured around AD 45 by the Roman Second Legion (Augusta), led by the future emperor Vespasian, who had already captured Maiden Castle and other hill forts to the south. Many Roman military artefacts have been found and it is quite likely that the Second Legion made a temporary camp on the hill, as at Hod Hill. After the initial campaigns, a more permanent Roman camp was established at nearby Ilchester and the Fosse Way military road was constructed within 1 mile (2 km) of Ham Hill, on its way to Axminster and the garrison at Exeter. The area was very prosperous in the Roman period and several major villas have been found nearby, including one on the eastern part of the hill in the field known as "Warren", with extensive mosaic. Other villas have been found at Stoke-sub-Hamdon, Odcombe, Lufton and West Coker. Just to the east of the main plateau is the isolated St. Michael's Hill, the "pointed hill" that gives its name to the village of Montacute and which was turned into a motte-and-bailey castle by the Normans.

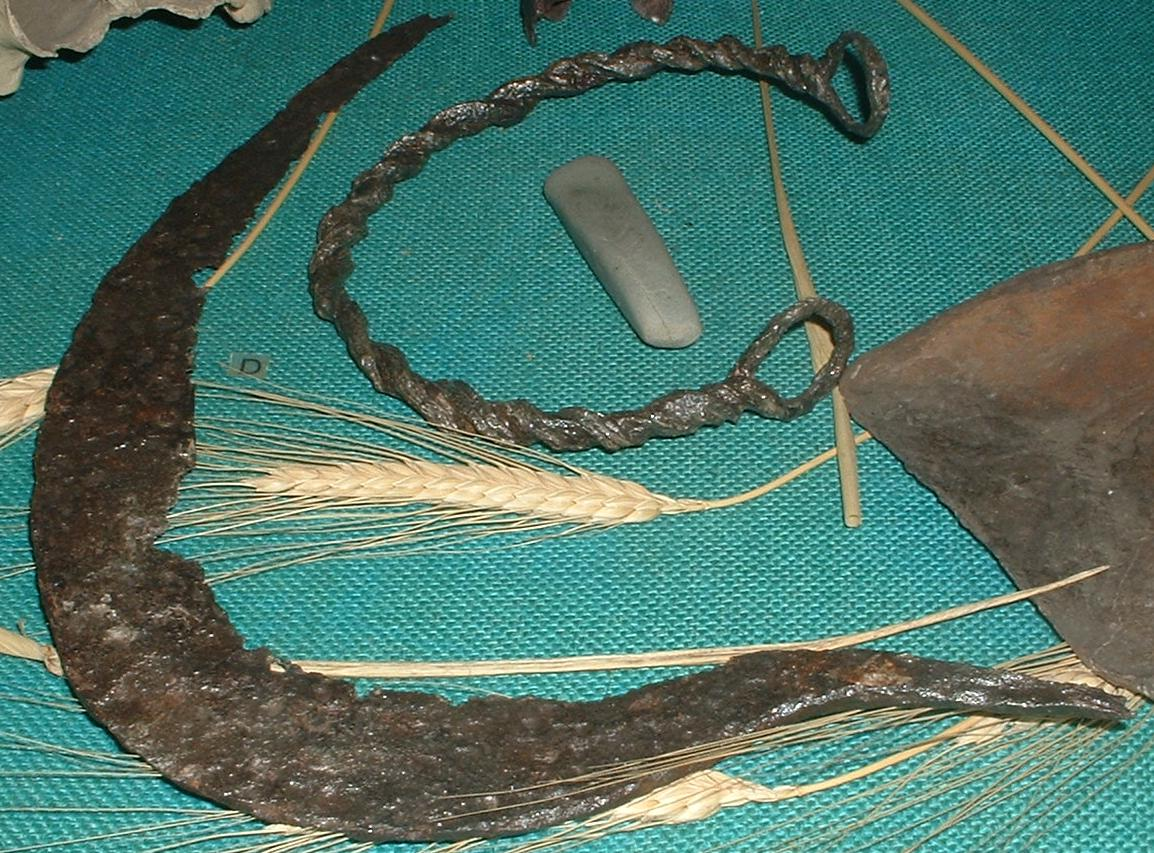
Celtic artefacts from Ham Hill

South of the main hill are strip lynchets, or low terraces created by ancient ploughing and cultivation and the deserted medieval village of Witcombe (or Whitcombe), which was finally abandoned in the 17th century.

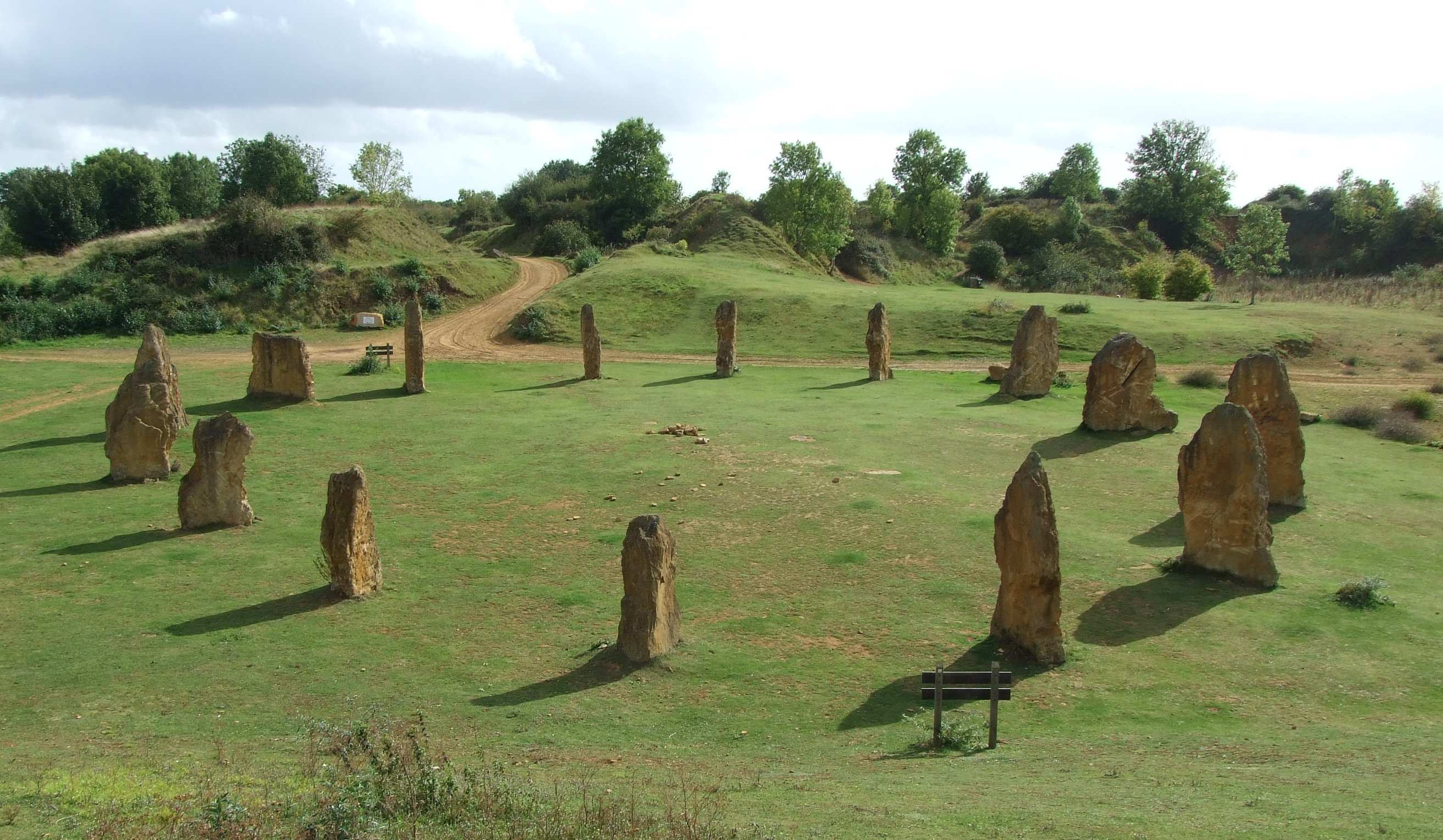
Ham Hill Stone Circle - erected in AD 2000

In the 1800s there were 24 small quarries operating on the hill employing some 200 men. This continued into the Victorian era with over 200 small family run quarries and masonry businesses. Many of these small quarries had ceased working by 1910. Today hamstone is only quarried in two areas at the top of Ham Hill. The North quarry, near the modern stone circle and war memorial, is the longest running hamstone quarry in existence. The southern, Norton Quarry extracts its stone from some 20–30 metres below the surface and is quarried by Harvey Stone. This quarry was reopened around 15 years ago, having been the last quarry abandoned in the 1930s due to there being, according to the masons working the hill "no good quality stone left". Both quarries are owned by the Duchy of Cornwall.

The northern end of the plateau is crowned by a war memorial to the dead of the nearby village of Stoke-sub-Hamdon killed during the two World Wars and subsequent conflicts. It was designed in 1920 and unveiled in 1923 with four steps which lead to a square plinth and a tapering four-sided obelisk with a flat top. The memorial is clearly visible from the surrounding countryside, including the A303 trunk road which now follows the course of the Fosse Way near the base of the hill. Just below the Monument is a bench dedicated to the memory of local student Alan Kneebone, who was murdered in 2001 while at Wakefield College.

== Recreation ==
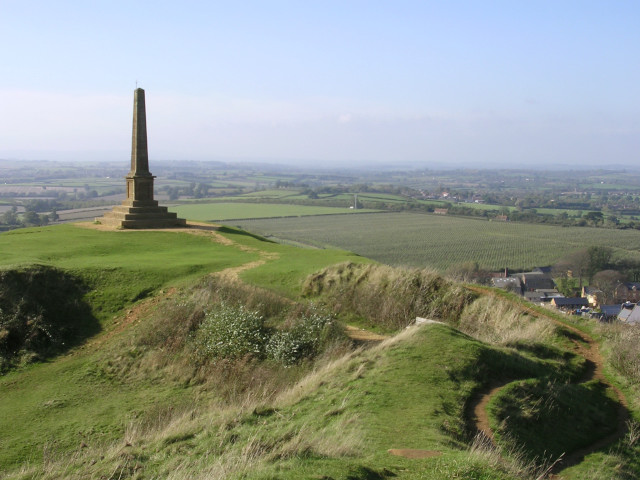
The War Memorial

The hill and the country park around it provide a venue for a variety of leisure and recreational uses, including walking, horse riding, mountain biking and orienteering. It is very popular with dog walkers. It is the end of the Leland trail, a 28 miles (45.1 km) footpath which runs from King Alfred's Tower to Ham Hill Country Park.

There is a limited amount of climbing available at Ham Hill with roughly 20 routes. These are top roped routes due to the nature of the rock, the difficulty of "topping out" and because the rock is of geological interest. There are also several bouldering problems.

There are two compass trails for orienteering: one in the stone circle area and one in Witcombe Valley. They are marked by sets of letters printed on small squares from A to J, which are attached to fence posts, signposts, gates and boulders.

Ham Hill is close to the Monarch's Way a 615-mile (990 km) long-distance footpath which approximates the escape route taken by King Charles II in 1651, after being defeated at the Battle of Worcester. and the start of the Liberty Trail which covers 28 miles (45 km) to Lyme Regis in Dorset.

== Country Park ==
Ham Hill is operated as a 390 acres (160 ha) country park by Somerset Council and is visited by over 250,000 people each year.

Prior to the designation of Ham Hill as a country park, three local farms used ancient free range grazing rights on the main grass area of the hill. Country Park status brought more visitors and most importantly, more dogs. The dogs made the grazing of sheep impossible. This has resulted in a noticeable change in vegetation in the last forty years. In many areas, what were areas of short-cropped grassland interspersed with short stemmed plants such as wild thyme and clovers have been replaced by rank bracken, gorse, bramble and wild parsley. The absence of the sheep has also enabled woodland to overrun and obscure the previously grassed Iron Age earthworks, most noticeably on the northern flank of the hill. A disastrous fire on the south-west flank of the hill (overlooking Little Norton) in the drought summer of 1976 was believed to have been caused by a discarded cigarette. The vegetation on the entire side of the hill was destroyed. When regrowth appeared, bracken was the dominant vegetation. In some places this has now given way to woodland, but the fine grassland of before the fire has not returned.

Other changes are due to farming habits. In previous years the plateau fields were almost exclusively used for grazing or growing spring wheat and left fallow during the winter. In some years the fields were lightly ploughed and mangolds grown for winter fodder. Following a change in ownership during the 1980s, this changed to winter-sown grain with deep ploughing with sludge injection. The change caused an immediate change to the wildlife. The winter flocks of finches were lost, the yellowhammers disappeared, the skylarks nearly so. The deep ploughing proved counter productive as millions of poppy seeds were brought to the surface making the grain difficult to harvest - something that had been warned of years earlier by a previous farmer, but disregarded. It was around this time that deep ploughing probably damaged the remains of the Roman mosaic at Batemore; the site was ploughed over (it had never been marked on the ground) and small pieces of tile were brought to the surface. The plateau fields are now under the control of the park authorities, who are attempting to restore them by allowing natural grassland regrowth, with controlled sheep grazing.

== Other reading ==
Randall, C. E., 2010. Livestock and landscape: exploring animal exploitation in later prehistory in the South West of Britain. PhD Thesis (PhD). Bournemouth University. Appendix 5 Ham Hill
