= Rimpton =

Village and civil parish in Somerset, England

Coordinates: 50.9944°N 2.5579°W

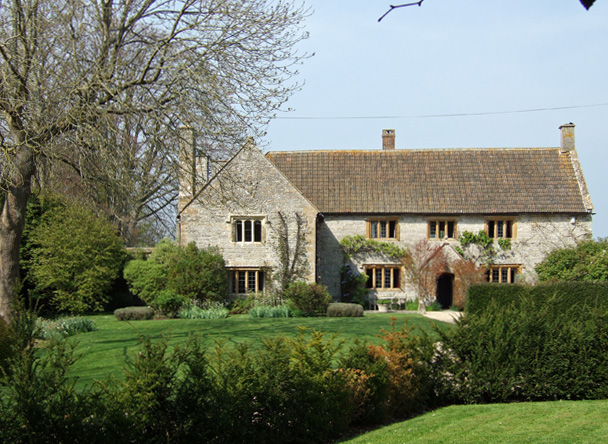
- Rimpton Manor

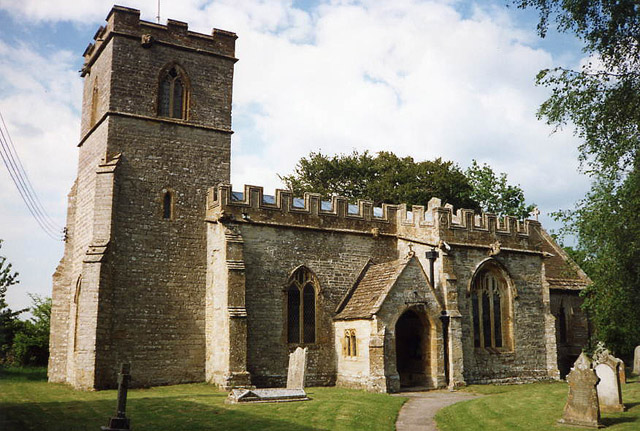
- Rimpton church

- Location within Somerset
- Population: 235 (2011)
- OS grid reference: ST609218
- Unitary authority: Somerset Council
- Ceremonial county: Somerset
- Region: South West
- Country: England
- Sovereign state: United Kingdom
- Post town: YEOVIL
- Postcode district: BA22
- Dialling code: 01935
- Police: Avon and Somerset
- Fire: Devon and Somerset
- Ambulance: South Western
- UK Parliament: Glastonbury and Somerton

Rimpton is a village and civil parish 5 miles (8 km) north-west of Sherborne, and 6 miles (10 km) north-east of Yeovil on a tributary of the River Parret in the county of Somerset, England.

== History ==
The parish of Rimpton was part of the Horethorne hundred until about 1735, and from then it was considered part of Taunton Deane hundred, although it was some distance from the rest of the hundred. The parish was part of Sherborne Poor Law Union from 1835 to 1896, although it remained part of Somerset.

== Governance ==
The parish council has responsibility for local issues, including setting an annual precept (local rate) to cover the council's operating costs and producing annual accounts for public scrutiny. The parish council evaluates local planning applications and works with the local police, district council officers, and neighbourhood watch groups on matters of crime, security, and traffic. The parish council's role also includes initiating projects for the maintenance and repair of parish facilities, as well as consulting with the district council on the maintenance, repair, and improvement of highways, drainage, footpaths, public transport, and street cleaning. Conservation matters (including trees and listed buildings) and environmental issues are also the responsibility of the council.

For local government purposes, since 1 April 2023, the parish comes under the unitary authority of Somerset Council. Prior to this, it was part of the non-metropolitan district of South Somerset (established under the Local Government Act 1972). It was part of Yeovil Rural District before 1974.

Rimpton is part of the electoral ward of Camelot.

It is also part of the Glastonbury and Somerton county constituency represented in the House of Commons of the Parliament of the United Kingdom. It elects one member of parliament (MP) by the first past the post system of election.

== Religious sites ==
The Church of St Mary dates from the early 13th century and has been designated by English Heritage as a Grade I listed building.
