= River Cam (Somerset) =

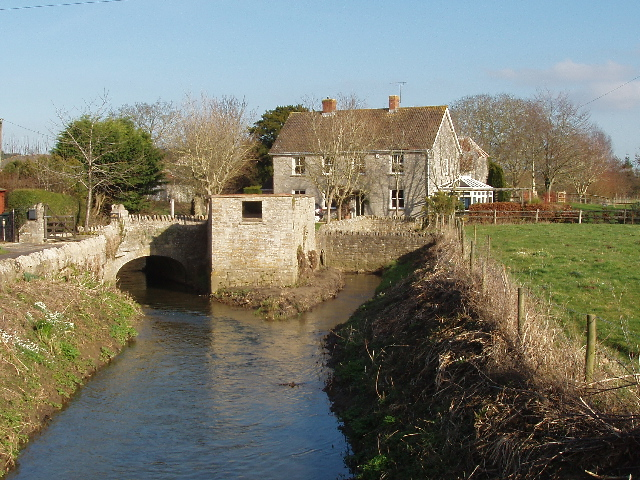
- File:The Old Mill on the River Cam, West Camel

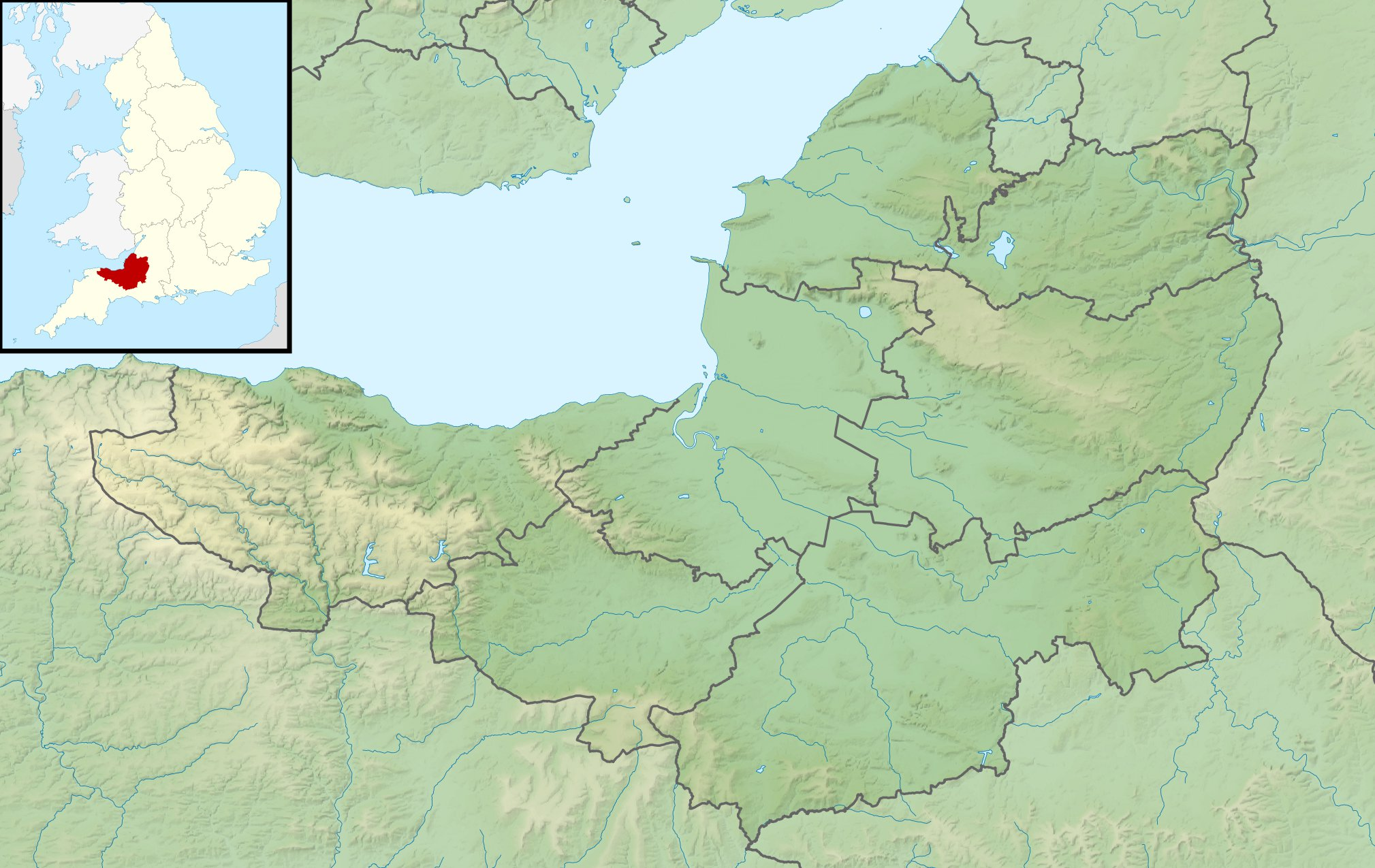
- Location of the mouth in Somerset

Location
- Country: England
- State: Somerset
- District: South Somerset
- City: North Cadbury, Sparkford, Queen Camel, West Camel

Physical characteristics
- Source
  - location: Yarlington
  - coordinates: 51°03′38″N 2°27′55″W
  - elevation: 144 m (472 ft)
- Mouth: River Yeo
  - location: Yeovilton
  - coordinates: 51°00′06″N 2°38′10″W
- Length: 17 km (11 mi)

The River Cam is a tributary of the River Yeo in the south of Somerset, England.

The Cam rises east of Yarlington (51°00′06″N 2°38′11″W). It flows south west past North Cadbury, Sparkford, Queen Camel and West Camel, and joins the Yeo near Yeovilton (51°00′06″N 2°38′11″W).

Other tributaries include the stream (designated Main River) through Blackford and Compton Pauncefoot and benefited from works in the 1980s to the riverbanks in Blackford to help keep the water moving. Flooding in Blackford is rarer than previously, as a result. This tributary stream has its headwaters in the hills around Blackford and Compton Pauncefoot together with a number of springs. The main waters come from three primary sources: Maperton, Quarry Hill and Sigwells Hill. The first two combine in Blackford around the Crossroads/Hollow and further springs contribute at several points all the way through both villages. The river then travels under the A303 to join the Yarlington headwaters.

The Cam flows onto the Royal Naval Station at Yeovilton where it joins the Yeo, which in turn flows west to the south of Yeovilton and through the town of Ilchester. The river course continues to the west and at Langport becomes the River Parrett.

In 2009 the river burst its banks at West Camel following flash flooding.

The dates the river got to top of the banks in Blackford since 2000 were:

9 May 2023, 24 March 2023, 4 January 2014, 9 February 2009, 13 December 2008,

Previous floods: 2000, May 1979 - major flooding of church Flooding in 1979 The Department of Transport, responsible for building the new A303, accepted that the impact from the discharges of runoff from that road to the A303 was a major factor. The DoT paid the church full compensation of £6500. Notes from 1981 indicate that the area of impervious roads that were responsible were an increase from 4.5 acres on the old A303 to 27 acres with the new road.

9 May 2023 flooding was caused by 2 thunderstorms converging and becoming trapped in the vicinity of North Cadbury and creating major flooding from River Cam (& tributaries) of Queen Camel, West Camel, North Cadbury and other villages making the national news. Somerset County Council started a Section 19 investigation under the Flood & Water Management Act 2010 by holding a series of meetings in June 2023 to gather information. A series of reports were issued in early 2025 https://www.somerset.gov.uk/beaches-ports-and-flooding/flood-investigations/

The Environment Agency has a monitoring station that gives a clear idea of how the water levels in the River Cam at Weston Bampfylde rises and falls:

0.60m is considered normal

Record High Levels: 2.09m 13.12.08, 2.85m 9.5.23

The data shows the river exceeded 1m on 28 occasions between 1998 and 2023: 1m - 1.29m 14 occasions, 1.3m - 1.49m 8 occasions, 1.5m or more 6 occasions, Total 28

1998 - Oct 2002 = 0, Nov 2002 - Dec 2007 = 3, Jan 2008 - Dec 2012 = 10, Jan 2013 - Dec 2018 = 10, Jan 2019 - Jul 2023 = 5, Total 28

Some years had no events and the maximum in one year was 5 in 2008.

The Environment Agency installed additional River Level Gauges in January 2024 as a pilot to provide alerts and early warnings in the local area as well as further downstream. Gauges have been installed in Blackford, North Cadbury and Yarlington. Further gauges added in 2024: Rimpton, Sparkford (Weston Bampfylde), West Camel, Yeovilton (Bridgehampton) and nearby on River Pitt at Pitcombe and Shepton Montague. The Community Flood Hub website with river levels telemetry is available:

https://cfh.aquaticinformatics.net/AQWebPortal
