= List of schools in Somerset =

This is a list of schools in Somerset, England. It covers those schools within the area of Somerset Council.

== State funded schools ==
=== Primary and first schools ===
As of 2015 there were 242 state primary schools in Somerset.

- Abbas and Templecombe CE Primary School, Templecombe
- All Saints CE Infants School, Dulverton
- All Saints Church School, Montacute
- Ash CE Primary School, Ash
- Ashcott Primary School, Ashcott
- Ashill Community Primary School, Ashill
- Ashlands CE First School, Crewkerne
- Avanti Park School, Frome
- Avishayes Community Primary School, Chard
- Axbridge CE First School Academy, Axbridge
- Baltonsborough CE Primary School, Baltonsborough
- Barwick and Stoford Community Primary School, Barwick
- Beckington CE First School, Beckington
- Beech Grove Primary School, Wellington
- Berkley CE First School, Berkley
- Berrow Primary Church Academy, Berrow
- Birchfield Community Primary School, Yeovil
- Bishop Henderson CE Primary School, Coleford
- Bishop Henderson CE Primary School, Taunton
- Bishops Hull Primary School, Bishops Hull
- Bishops Lydeard Church School, Bishops Lydeard
- Blackbrook Primary School, Taunton
- Bowlish Infant School, Bowlish
- Brent Knoll CE Primary School, Brent Knoll
- Bridgwater College Academy, Bridgwater
- Brookside Community Primary School, Street
- Bruton Primary School, Bruton
- Buckland St Mary CE School, Buckland St Mary
- Burnham-on-Sea Community Infant School, Burnham-on-Sea
- Butleigh CE Primary School, Butleigh
- Cannington CE Primary School, Cannington
- Castle Cary Community Primary School, Castle Cary
- Castle Primary School, Stoke-sub-Hamdon
- Catcott Primary School, Catcott
- Charlton Horethorne CE Primary School, Charlton Horethorne
- Charlton Mackrell CE Primary School, Charlton Mackrell
- Cheddar First School, Cheddar
- Cheddon Fitzpaine Church School, Cheddon Fitzpaine
- Chewton Mendip CE Primary School, Chewton Mendip
- Chilthorne Domer Church School, Chilthorne Domer
- Christ Church CE First School, Frome
- Churchfield Church School, Highbridge
- Churchstanton Primary School, Churchstanton
- Combe St Nicholas CE Primary School, Combe St Nicholas
- Cotford St Luke Primary School, Cotford St Luke
- Countess Gytha Primary School, Queen Camel
- Coxley Primary School, Wells
- Creech St Michael CE Primary School, Creech St Michael
- Croscombe CE Primary School, Croscombe
- Crowcombe CE Primary School, Crowcombe
- Curry Mallet CE Primary School, Curry Mallet
- Curry Rivel CE Primary School, Curry Rivel
- Cutcombe CE First School, Wheddon Cross
- Ditcheat Primary School, Ditcheat
- Draycott & Rodney Stoke CE First School, Draycott
- Dulverton Junior School, Dulverton
- Dunster First School, Dunster
- East Brent CE Academy, East Brent
- East Coker Community Primary School, East Coker
- East Huntspill Primary Academy, East Huntspill
- Eastover Primary School, Bridgwater
- Elmhurst Junior School, Street
- Enmore CE Primary School, Enmore
- Evercreech CE Primary School, Evercreech
- Exford CE First School, Exford
- Hambridge Community Primary School, Hambridge
- Hamp Academy, Bridgwater
- Hamp Infants' School, Bridgwater
- Haselbury Plucknett CE First School, Haselbury Plucknett
- Hatch Beauchamp CE Primary School, Hatch Beauchamp
- Hayesdown First School, Frome
- Hemington Primary School, Hemington
- Herne View CE Primary School, Ilminster
- High Ham CE Primary School, High Ham
- Hindhayes Infant School, Street
- Hinton St George CE Primary School, Hinton St George
- Holway Park Community Primary School, Taunton
- Holy Trinity CE Primary School, Taunton
- Holy Trinity Church School, Yeovil
- Horrington Primary School, West Horrington
- Horsington Church School, Horsington
- Huish Episcopi Primary School, Huish Episcopi
- Huish Primary School, Yeovil
- Ilchester Community School, Ilchester
- Isambard Kingdom Brunel Primary School, Wellington
- Keinton Mandeville Primary School, Keinton Mandeville
- Kilmersdon CE Primary School, Kilmersdon
- King Ina CE Academy, Somerton
- Kingfisher Primary School, Houndstone
- Kingsbury Episcopi Primary School, Kingsbury Episcopi
- Kingsmoor Primary School, Bawdrip
- Kingston St Mary CE Primary School, Kingston St Mary
- Knights Templar Community Church School, Watchet
- Langford Budville CE Primary School, Langford Budville
- Leigh-on-Mendip School, Leigh-on-Mendip
- Long Sutton CE Primary School, Long Sutton
- Lovington CE Primary School, Lovington
- Lydeard St Lawrence Community Primary School, Lydeard St Lawrence
- Lympsham CE Academy, Lympsham
- Lyngford Park Primary School, Taunton
- Manor Court Community Primary School, Chard
- Mark First & Pre School CE Academy, Mark
- Martock CE Primary School, Martock
- Meare Village Primary School, Meare
- Mells CE First School, Mells
- Merriott First School, Merriott
- Middlezoy Primary School, Middlezoy
- Milborne Port Primary School, Milborne Port
- Milford Infants' School, Yeovil
- Milford Junior School, Yeovil
- Milverton Community Primary School, Milverton
- Minehead First School, Minehead
- Minerva Primary School, Taunton
- Neroche Primary School, Ilminster
- Nerrols Primary School, Taunton
- Nether Stowey CE Primary School, Nether Stowey
- North Cadbury CE Primary School, North Cadbury
- North Curry CE Primary School, North Curry
- North Newton Community Primary School, North Newton
- North Petherton Primary School, North Petherton
- North Town Academy, Taunton
- Northgate Primary School, Bridgwater
- Norton Fitzwarren Church School, Norton Fitzwarren
- Norton St Philip CE First School, Norton St Philip
- Norton-Sub-Hamdon CE Primary School, Norton Sub Hamdon
- Nunney First School, Nunney
- Oake, Bradford and Nynehead Primary School, Oake
- Oakhill Church School, Oakhill
- Oaklands Primary School, Yeovil
- Old Cleeve CE School, Washford
- Orchard Grove Primary School, Wellington
- Othery Village School, Othery
- Otterhampton Primary School, Combwich
- Our Lady of Mount Carmel RC Primary, Wincanton
- Parkfield Primary School, Taunton
- Pawlett Primary School, Pawlett
- Pen Mill Infant and Nursery Academy, Yeovil
- Preston CE Primary School, Yeovil
- Priddy Primary School, Priddy
- Primrose Lane Primary School, Yeovil
- Priorswood Primary School, Taunton
- Puriton Primary School, Puriton
- Reckleford Infant School, Yeovil
- The Redstart Primary School, Chard
- Rockwell Green CE Primary School, Rockwell Green
- Rode Methodist First School, Rode
- Ruishton CE Primary School, Ruishton
- St Aldhelm's CE Primary School, Doulting
- St Andrew's CE Junior School, Burnham-on-Sea
- St Andrew's Church School, Taunton
- St Bartholomew's CE First School, Crewkerne
- St Benedict's CE Junior School, Glastonbury
- St Benedict's RC Primary School, Midsomer Norton
- St Cuthbert's CE Academy Infants, Wells
- St Cuthbert's CE Junior School, Wells
- St Dubricius CE School, Porlock
- St George's RC School, Taunton
- St Gildas RC Primary School, Yeovil
- St James Church School, Taunton
- St John and St Francis Church School, Bridgwater
- St John's CE First School, Frome
- St John's CE Infants School, Glastonbury
- St John's CE Primary School, Wellington
- St Joseph and St Teresa RC Primary School, Wells
- St Joseph's RC Primary School, Bridgwater
- St Joseph's RC Primary School, Burnham-on-Sea
- St Lawrence's CE Primary School, Westbury-sub-Mendip
- St Louis RC Primary School, Frome
- St Margaret's School, Tintinhull
- St Mary and St Peter's Church School, Ilton
- St Mary's CE Primary School, Bridgwater
- St Michael's Academy, Yeovil
- St Michael's CE First School, Minehead
- St Nicholas CE Primary School, Henstridge
- St Paul's CE Junior School, Shepton Mallet
- St Peter's CE First School, Williton
- St Vigor and St John Church School, Chilcompton
- Sampford Arundel Community Primary School, Sampford Arundel
- Shepton Beauchamp Church School, Shepton Beauchamp
- Shepton Mallet Community Infants' School, Shepton Mallet
- Shipham CE First School, Shipham
- Somerset Bridge Primary School, Bridgwater
- South Petherton CE Infants School, South Petherton
- South Petherton Junior School, South Petherton
- Spaxton CE Primary School, Spaxton
- Staplegrove Church School, Staplegrove
- Stawley Primary School, Stawley
- Stoberry Park School, Wells
- Stogumber CE Primary School, Stogumber
- Stogursey CE Primary School, Stogursey
- Stoke St Gregory CE Primary School, Stoke St Gregory
- Stoke St Michael Primary School, Stoke St Michael
- Tatworth Primary School, Tatworth
- Thurlbear CE Primary School, Thurlbear
- Timberscombe CE First School, Timberscombe
- Trinity CE First School, Frome
- Trull CE Primary School, Trull
- Upton Noble CE Primary School, Upton Noble
- Vallis First School, Frome
- Walton CE Primary School, Walton
- Weare Academy First School, Weare
- Wedmore First School Academy, Wedmore
- Wellesley Park Primary School, Wellington
- Wellsprings Primary School, Taunton
- Wembdon St George's Church School, Wembdon
- West Buckland Primary School, West Buckland
- West Chinnock CE Primary School, West Chinnock
- West Coker CE Primary School, West Coker
- West Huntspill Primary Academy, West Huntspill
- West Monkton CE School, Monkton Heathfield
- West Pennard CE Primary School, West Pennard
- Westonzoyland Community Primary School, Westonzoyland
- Westover Green Community School, Bridgwater
- Willowdown Primary School, Bridgwater
- Wincanton Primary School, Wincanton
- Winsham Primary School, Winsham
- Wiveliscombe Primary School, Wiveliscombe
- Wookey Primary School, Wookey
- Woolavington Village Primary School, Woolavington

=== Middle schools ===
- Avanti Park School, Frome
- Danesfield CE Middle School, Williton
- Fairlands Middle School, Cheddar
- Hugh Sexey CE Middle School, Blackford
- Maiden Beech Academy, Crewkerne
- Minehead Middle School, Minehead
- Oakfield Academy, Frome
- Selwood Academy, Frome

=== Secondary and upper schools ===
As of 2015 there were 44 state secondary schools in Somerset.

- Ansford Academy, Castle Cary
- Bishop Fox's School, Taunton
- The Blue School, Wells
- Bridgwater College Academy, Bridgwater
- Brymore Academy, Cannington
- Bucklers Mead Academy, Yeovil
- The Castle School, Taunton
- Chilton Trinity School, Chilton Trinity
- Court Fields School, Wellington
- Crispin School, Street
- Frome Community College, Frome
- Haygrove School, Bridgwater
- Holyrood Academy, Chard
- Huish Episcopi Academy, Huish Episcopi
- The King Alfred School, Highbridge
- King Arthur's School, Wincanton
- The Kings of Wessex Academy, Cheddar
- Kingsmead School, Wiveliscombe
- Monkton Wood Academy, Monkton Heathfield
- Preston School, Yeovil
- Pyrland School, Taunton
- Robert Blake Science College, Bridgwater
- St Dunstan's School, Glastonbury
- Sexey's School, Bruton
- Stanchester Academy, Stoke-sub-Hamdon
- Wadham School, Crewkerne
- West Somerset College, Minehead
- Westfield Academy, Yeovil
- Whitstone School, Shepton Mallet

=== Special and alternative schools ===
- Avalon School, Street
- The Bridge School Sedgemoor, Cossington
- Critchill Special School, Frome
- Fairmead School, Yeovil
- Fiveways Special School, Yeovil
- The Mendip School, Prestleigh
- Polden Bower School, Bridgwater
- Selworthy Special School, Taunton
- The Sky Academy, Taunton
- South Somerset Partnership School, Yeovil
- Taunton Deane Partnership College, Taunton
- Tor School, Glastonbury

=== Further education ===
- Bridgwater and Taunton College, at Bridgwater, Taunton, and Cannington
- Dillington House, Whitelackington
- Richard Huish College, Taunton
- Strode College, Street
- Yeovil College, Yeovil

== Independent schools ==
=== Primary and preparatory schools ===
- All Hallows Preparatory School, East Cranmore
- Chard School, Chard
- Hazlegrove Preparatory School, Sparkford
- King's Hall School, Cheddon Fitzpaine
- Millfield Preparatory School, Glastonbury
- Perrott Hill Prep School, North Perrott
- Springmead Preparatory School, Beckington
- Taunton Preparatory School, Taunton

=== Senior and all-through schools ===
- Bruton School for Girls, Bruton
- Downside School, Stratton-on-the-Fosse
- King's College, Taunton
- King's School, Bruton
- Millfield, Street
- Queen's College, Taunton
- Taunton School, Taunton
- Wellington School, Wellington
- Wells Cathedral School, Wells

=== Special and alternative schools ===
- 3 Dimensions, Wadeford
- Abbot's Way School, Meare
- Cambian Somerset School, Creech St Michael
- Chilton Bridge School, Chilton Cantelo
- Compton Dundon School, Compton Dundon
- Dovecote School, Shapwick
- Inaura School, Burrowbridge
- The Levels School, Ashcott
- Marchant Holliday School, North Cheriton
- Newbury Manor School, Newbury, near Mells
- North Hill House School, Frome
- The Orchard School, Lufton
- Park House School, Taunton
- Petherton Park School, North Petherton
- Sedgemoor Manor School, Mark
- Silver Bridge School, Taunton
- Somerset Progressive School, West Hatch
- Wessex Lodge School, Frome

== Sources ==
- "Somerset Schools Directory". Somerset County Council. Archived from the original on 14 October 2011.
