= Grade I listed buildings in Somerset =

Buildings of exceptional interest in Somerset

Unitary authorities of Somerset

1 Somerset Council
2 North Somerset
3 Bath and North East Somerset

The Grade I listed buildings in Somerset, England, demonstrate the history and diversity of its architecture.

The ceremonial county of Somerset is administered by three unitary authorities. Two of the unitary authorities were established on 1 April 1996 following the breakup of the county of Avon, are North Somerset and Bath and North East Somerset. These unitary authorities include areas that were once part of Somerset before the creation of Avon in 1974.

The rest of the county is administered by Somerset Council which was established on 1 April 2023 replacing the former Somerset County Council and four districts, South Somerset, Mendip, Sedgemoor and Somerset West and Taunton. West Somerset and Taunton Deane previously existed until 1 April 2019 when they merged to form Somerset West and Taunton.

In the United Kingdom, the term listed building refers to a building or other structure officially designated as being of special architectural, historical, or cultural significance, Grade I structures are those considered to be "buildings of exceptional interest". Listing was begun by a provision in the Town and Country Planning Act 1947. Once listed, strict limitations are imposed on the modifications allowed to a building's structure or fittings. In England, the authority for listing under the Planning (Listed Buildings and Conservation Areas) Act 1990 rests with English Heritage, a non-departmental public body sponsored by the Department for Digital, Culture, Media and Sport; local authorities have a responsibility to regulate and enforce the planning regulations.

Each of the districts include Norman- or medieval-era churches, many of which are included in the Somerset towers, a collection of distinctive, mostly spireless Gothic architecture church towers. The prolific construction of the towers—some started before 1360—was typically accomplished by a master mason and a small team of itinerant masons, supplemented by local parish labourers, according to Poyntz Wright. But other authors reject this model, suggesting instead that leading architects designed the parish church towers based on early examples of Perpendicular design and ornamentation developed for cathedrals—their most important commissions. Contract builders carried out the plans, adding a distinctive mix of innovative details and decorations as new designs emerged over the years. These are included in the list of towers in Somerset.

Apart from the churches, each area has its own characteristics. Most of Bath's Grade I listed buildings are made from the local golden-coloured Bath Stone, and date from the 18th and 19th centuries. Their dominant architectural style is Georgian. In the Mendip district, the greatest concentrations of these cluster around the cathedral and abbey in Wells and in Glastonbury. North Somerset features bridges and piers along with a selection of Manor houses. The Sedgemoor district has many buildings related to trade and commerce centred on Bridgwater; while in South Somerset abbeys, priories and farmhouses predominate. Taunton Deane includes the defensive Taunton Castle, similarly Dunster Castle and related buildings in Dunster feature in West Somerset.

Click here to see an interactive OpenStreetMap with locations of all Grade I listed buildings, Somerset-wide, for which coordinates are included in the list-articles linked below.

== Bath and North East Somerset ==
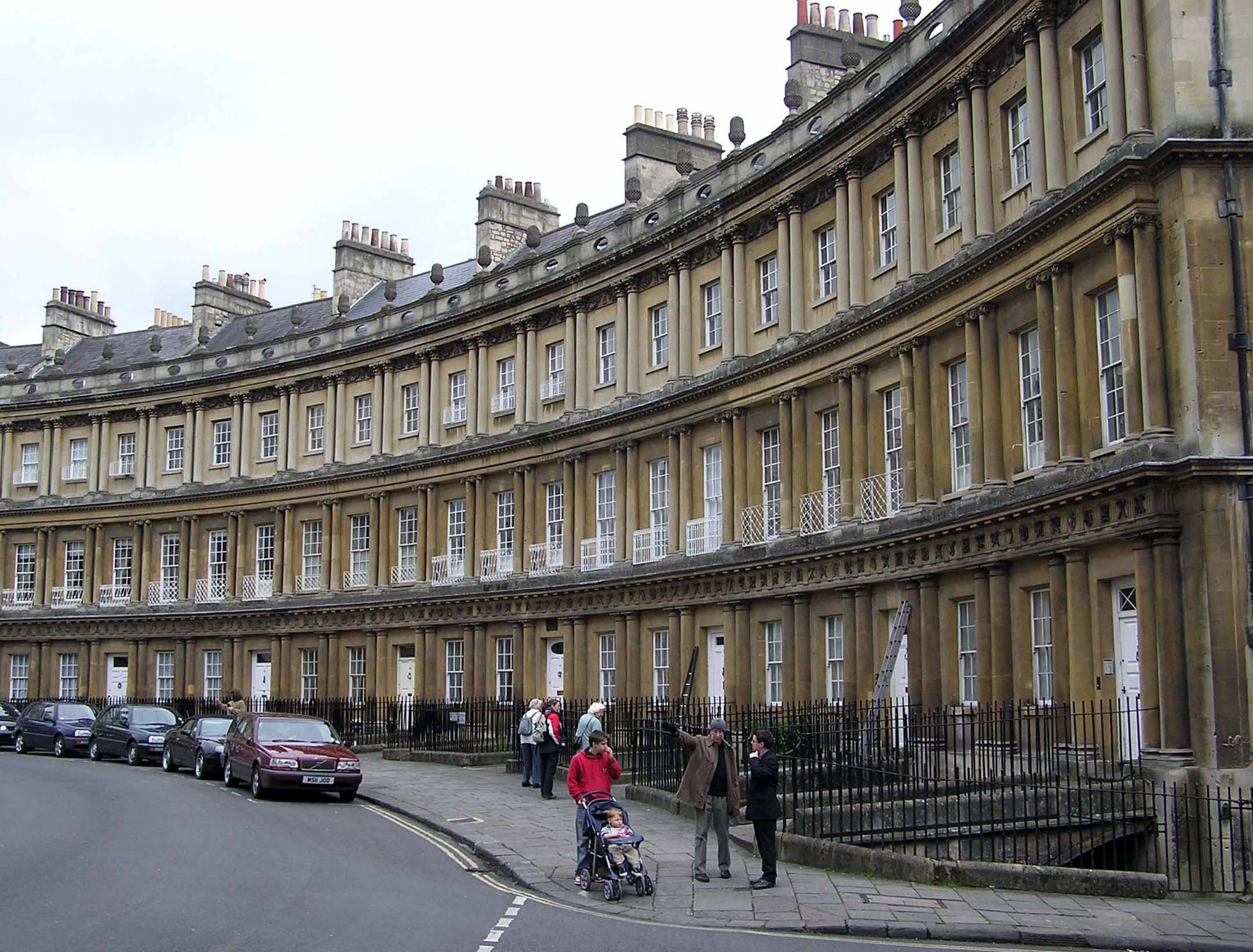
The Circus consists of three long, curved terraces designed by the elder John Wood to form a circular space or theatre intended for civic functions and games. It was inspired by the Colosseum in Rome.

Bath and North East Somerset (commonly referred to as BANES or B&NES) is a unitary authority created on 1 April 1996, following the abolition of the County of Avon. Bath and North East Somerset occupies an area of 220 square miles (570 km^{2}), two-thirds of which is green belt. BANES stretches from the outskirts of Bristol, south into the Mendip Hills and east to the southern Cotswold Hills and Wiltshire border. The city of Bath is the principal settlement in the district, but BANES also covers Keynsham, Midsomer Norton, Radstock and the Chew Valley. BANES has a population of 170,000, about half of whom live in Bath, making it 12 times more densely populated than the rest of the district.

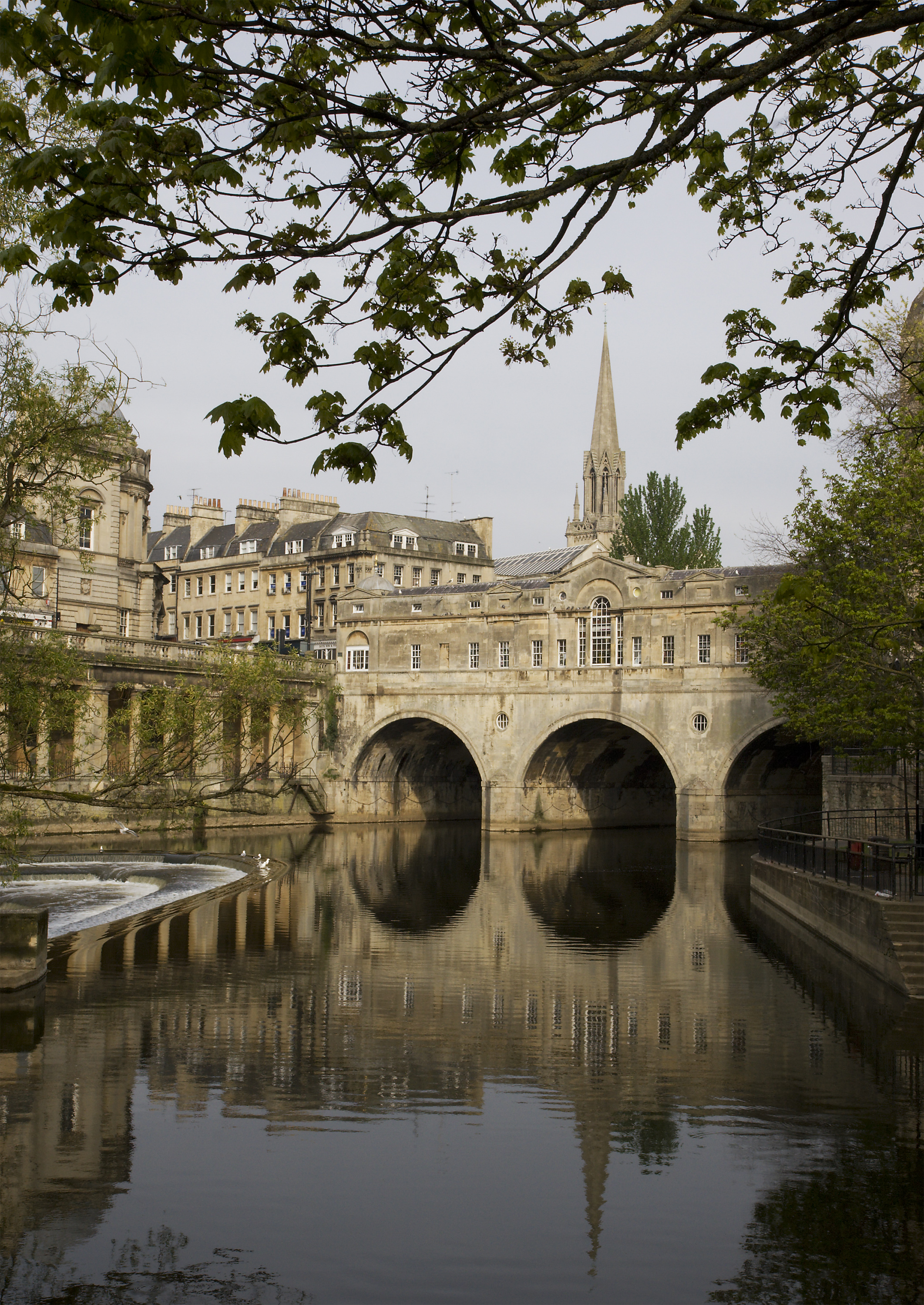
The neoclassical architect Robert Adam designed Pulteney Bridge, using as the prototype for the three-arched bridge spanning the Avon an original, but unused, design by Palladio for the Rialto Bridge in Venice.

Bath and North East Somerset has 663 Grade I listed buildings, one of the highest concentrations in the country, covered by about 100 English Heritage listings. The oldest sites within Bath are the Roman Baths, for which the foundation piles and an irregular stone chamber lined with lead were built during the Roman occupation of Britain, although the current building is from the 18th century. Bath Abbey was a Norman church built on earlier foundations, although the present building dates from the early 16th century and shows a late Perpendicular style with flying buttresses and crocketed pinnacles decorating a crenellated and pierced parapet. The medieval era is represented by the remains of the city walls in Upper Borough Walls.

Most of Bath's Grade I listed buildings are made from the local golden-coloured Bath Stone, and date from the 18th and 19th centuries. Their dominant architectural style is Georgian, which evolved from the Palladian revival style that became popular during the early 18th century. This led to the entire city's designation as a World Heritage Site.

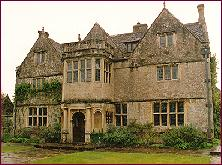
St Catherine's Court is a Tudor manor house in a secluded valley north of Bath.

Much of the development, and many of the buildings, were the vision of John Wood, the Elder. The Circus is seen as the pinnacle of Wood's work. It consists of three long, curved terraces that form a circular space or theatre intended for civic functions and games. The games give a clue to the design, the inspiration for which was the Colosseum in Rome. The best known of Bath's terraces is the Royal Crescent, built between 1767 and 1774 and designed by Wood's son, John Wood, the Younger. Around 1770 the neoclassical architect Robert Adam designed Pulteney Bridge, a three-arched bridge spanning the Avon. He used as his prototype an original, but unused, design by Palladio for the Rialto Bridge in Venice. The heart of the Georgian city was the Pump Room, which together with its associated Lower Assembly Rooms was designed by Thomas Baldwin, a local builder responsible for many other buildings in the city, including the terraces in Argyle Street. Great Pulteney Street, where Baldwin eventually lived, is another of his works: this wide boulevard, constructed c. 1789 and over 1,000 feet (305 m) long and 100 feet (30 m) wide, is lined on both sides by Georgian terraces.

Outside the city of Bath most of the Grade I listed buildings are Norman- or medieval-era churches. Manor houses such as Claverton Manor, which now houses the American Museum in Britain, and the 18th-century Newton Park, which has a landscape garden designed by Capability Brown, also appear in the list; Newton Park now forms part of the Bath Spa University. There is also Grade I listed canal architecture outside the city, such as Dundas Aqueduct and Claverton Pumping Station, both designed by John Rennie. The most recent building is the agricultural Eastwood Manor Farm Steading, completed in 1860.

== North Somerset ==
North Somerset is a unitary authority which is administered independently of the non-metropolitan county of Somerset. Its administrative headquarters are located in the town hall of Weston-super-Mare, and has a resident population of 193,000 living in 85,000 households.

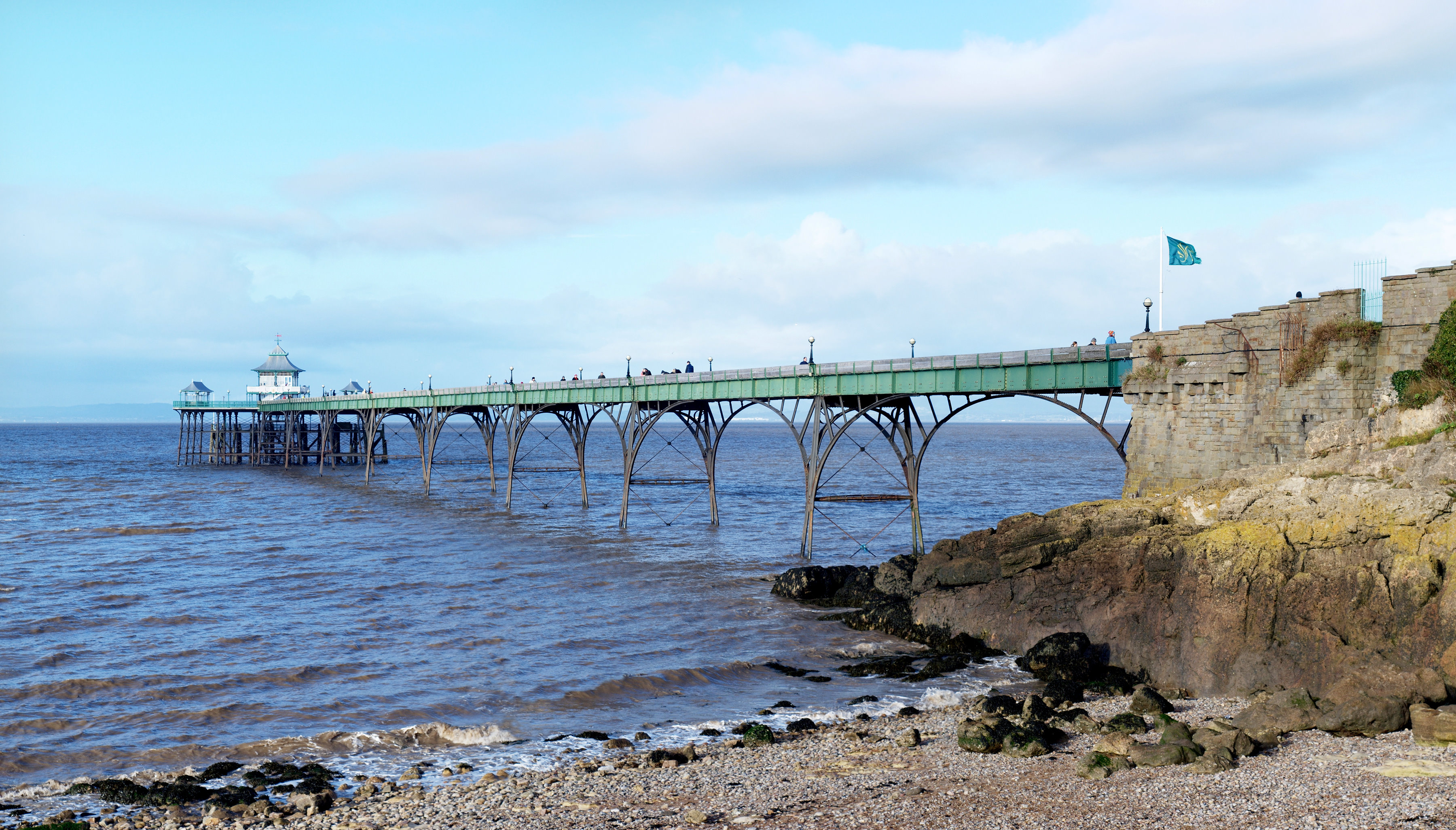
Clevedon Pier which was built between the 1860s and 1890s. It was removed following damage in 1970 and restored, before being rebuilt and reopened to the public in 1998.

There are 37 Grade I listed buildings in North Somerset, including the Clifton Suspension Bridge, which joins North Somerset to Bristol and Clevedon Pier which was built between the 1860s and 1890s. It was removed following damage in 1970 and restored, before being rebuilt and reopened to the public in 1998. Of the listed buildings, manor houses are well represented. They include Clevedon Court, built in the 14th century, and from the 15th century, Ashton Court and Nailsea Court. North Somerset has many religious structures; the largest number are from the Norman or medieval eras. The oldest is the Church of St. Quiricus and St. Julietta in Tickenham which dates from the 11th century, and there are 8 others from the 12th century.

The most recent Grade I building in North Somerset is Tyntesfield, a Victorian Gothic Revival estate near Wraxall. It was acquired by the National Trust in June 2002 after a fund raising campaign to prevent its being sold to private interests and ensure it be opened to the public. The appeal by the National Trust collected £8.2 million from the public in just 100 days and the Trust also received the largest single grant ever by the National Heritage Memorial Fund (at £17.4 million), which caused some controversy. The house is built of Bath stone, and is highly picturesque, bristling with turrets and possessing an elaborate roof.

== Somerset (district) ==
=== Mendip ===
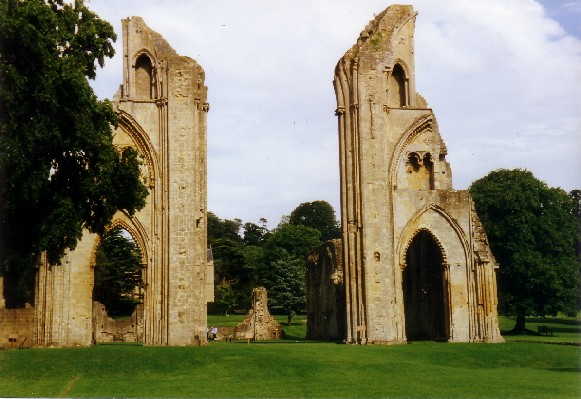
Glastonbury Abbey was founded in the 8th century and developed through the Saxon and Medieval eras until the dissolution of the monasteries between 1536 and 1541, after which it fell into disrepair.

Mendip is a former local government district which covers a largely rural area of 285 square miles (738 km^{2}) ranging from the Mendip Hills through on to the Somerset Levels. It has a population of approximately 11,000. The administrative centre of the district is Shepton Mallet.

There are 90 Grade I listed buildings in the former Mendip district. There are churches in the various towns and villages, however the greatest concentrations of Grade I listed buildings are in Wells and Glastonbury. In Wells these are clustered around the 10th-century Cathedral Church of St Andrew, better known as Wells Cathedral, and the 13th-century Bishop's Palace. Glastonbury is the site of the Abbey, where construction started in the 7th century, and its associated buildings. The ruined St Michael's church, itself replacing the one destroyed in an earthquake of 1275, stands on Glastonbury Tor, where the site shows evidence of occupation from Neolithic times and the Dark Ages. The Chalice Well has been in use since Pre-Christian times. Glastonbury Abbey had a wider influence outside the town: tithe barns were built at Pilton and West Bradley to hold tithes, and a Fish House was built at Meare along with a summer residence for the Abbot (now Manor Farmhouse).

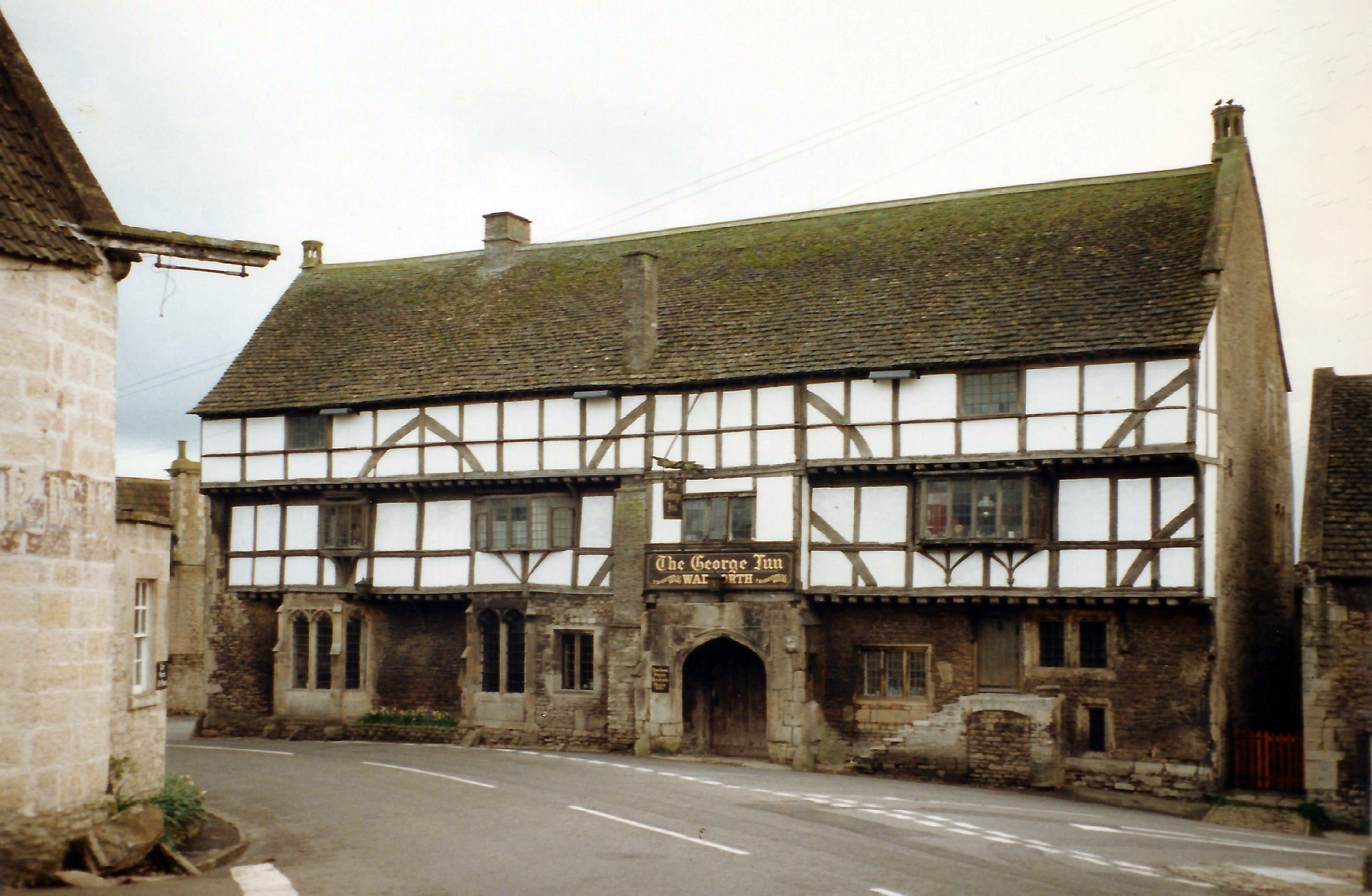
The George Inn in Norton St Philip was built in the 14th or 15th century, as a wool store for the priory at Hinton Charterhouse. It was later used as army headquarters, during the Monmouth Rebellion in 1685, and a courtroom by Judge Jefferies as part of the Bloody Assizes. It is now a public house.

Medieval structures include Farleigh Hungerford Castle, fortified around 1370, and The George Inn at Norton St Philip, used as an army headquarters during the Monmouth Rebellion in 1685, and then as a courtroom to try the rebels in the Bloody Assizes. Manor houses such as the 15th-century Seymours Court Farmhouse at Beckington and The Old Manor at Croscombe. Mells Manor followed in the 16th century and in the 17th century Southill House in Cranmore was built. Ston Easton Park and Ammerdown House in Kilmersdon were both completed in the 18th century. The most recent buildings included in the list are churches: the Church of St Peter at Hornblotton, built in 1872–74 by Sir Thomas Graham Jackson to replace a medieval church on the same site, and Downside Abbey at Stratton-on-the-Fosse, more formally known as "The Basilica of St Gregory the Great at Downside", a Roman Catholic Benedictine monastery and the Senior House of the English Benedictine Congregation. The current buildings were started in the 19th century and are still unfinished.

=== Sedgemoor ===
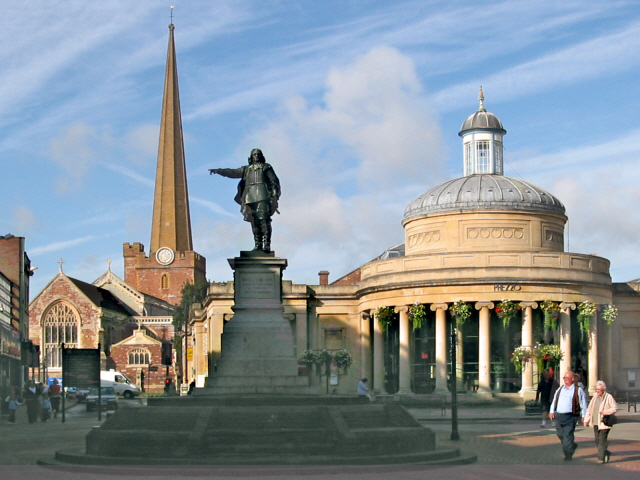
Bridgwater's Corn Exchange of 1834, 13th-century Church of St Mary with its 170 feet (52 m) slender spire and statue of Robert Blake

Sedgemoor former district is a low-lying area of land close to sea level between the Quantock and Mendip hills, historically largely marsh (or moor). It contains the bulk of the area also known as the Somerset Levels, including Europe's oldest known engineered roadway, the Sweet Track.

There are 53 Grade I listed buildings in Sedgemoor, 14 of which are in Castle Street, Bridgwater. In 1834, Castle Street was built on the site of the demolished Bridgwater Castle, as homes for the merchants trading in the town's port. Outside the town of Bridgwater, the largest concentration of Grade I listed buildings are in the village of Cannington, where the 12th-century Cannington Court and 14th-century Church of St Mary were both associated with a Benedictine nunnery. Cannington is also the site of the 13th-century Gurney Manor and Blackmoor Farmhouse, which was built around 1480 with its own chapel. Although 11th-century churches such as the Church of St Michael at Brent Knoll and the Church of St Mary at Charlynch near Spaxton are still standing only blue lias rubble walling standing on a conical earthwork with a ditch approximately 820 feet (250 m) in circumference are the only remains of Stowey Castle which was destroyed in the 15th century, which may have been as a penalty for the local Lord Audley's involvement in the Second Cornish Uprising of 1497 led by Perkin Warbeck.

Many of the more recent structures in the list are manor houses such as Halswell House, where the south range was built in the 16th century for Sir Nicholas Halswell and the main north range in 1689 for Sir Halswell Tynte. The most recently constructed building in the list is the Corn Exchange in Bridgwater, built in 1834.

=== South Somerset ===
The former South Somerset district occupies an area of 370 square miles (958 km^{2}), stretching from its borders with Devon and Dorset to the edge of the Somerset Levels. The district has a population of about 158,000, and has Yeovil as its administrative centre.

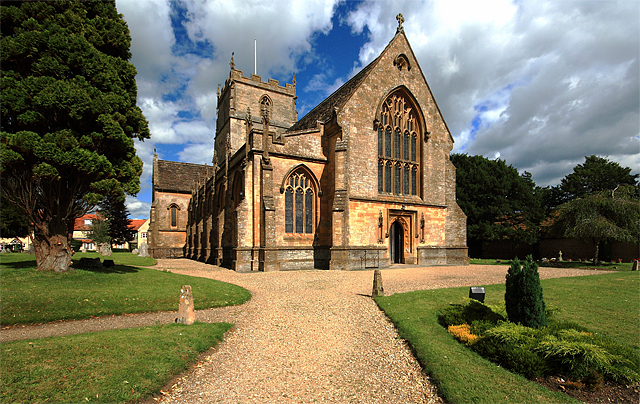
The Church of St John the Evangelist, Milborne Port is of late Anglo-Saxon date, and parts may well span the Norman conquest.

There are 94 Grade I listed buildings in South Somerset. Most are Norman- or medieval-era churches, but there are other religious buildings as well. Muchelney Abbey consists of the remains and foundations of a medieval Benedictine Abbey and an early Tudor house dating from the 16th century, formerly the lodgings of the resident abbot. Stavordale Priory was built as a priory church in the 13th century and was converted into a private residence in 1533. The Hamstone Stoke sub Hamdon Priory is a 14th-century former priest's house of the chantry chapel of St Nicholas, which after 1518 become a farm known as Parsonage Farmhouse. It remained a farm until about 1960, and has been owned by the National Trust since 1946.

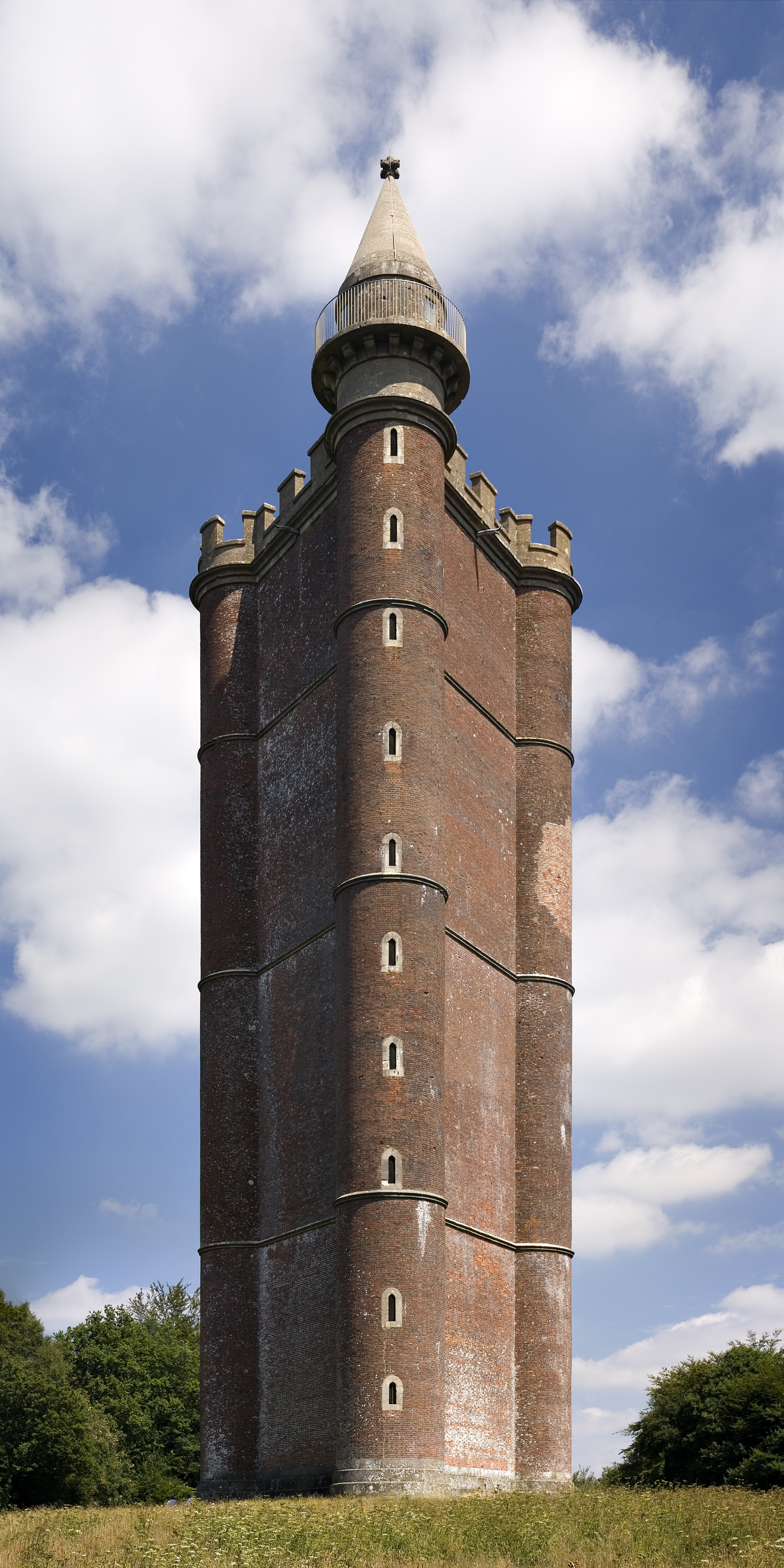
King Alfred's Tower was built around 1770 to commemorate the end of the Seven Years' War against France and the accession of King George III.

Since the Reformation the 13th-century Hanging Chapel in Langport has been a town hall, courthouse, grammar school, museum, and armoury before becoming a masonic hall in 1891. The house known as The Abbey in Charlton Mackrell takes its name from the site on which it was built, the Chantry Chapel of the Holy Spirit, founded in 1237. Naish Priory, built around 1400 in East Coker, was never a priory, and similarly the Abbey Farm House and Abbey Barn in Yeovil which date from around 1420, have always been in lay-ownership; "abbey" was added to their names in the 19th century. The 140-foot (43 m) Burton Pynsent Monument was designed in 1767, by Capability Brown for William Pitt, as a monument to Sir William Pynsent, Bt. King Alfred's Tower, a 161 feet (49 m) high, triangular edifice, stands near Egbert's stone, where it is believed that Alfred the Great, King of Wessex, rallied the Saxons in May 878 before the Battle of Ethandun. The towers funder, Henry Hoare, planned for it to commemorate the end of the Seven Years' War against France and the accession of King George III.

The other Grade I listed buildings in South Somerset are manor houses, built over long periods by local Lords of the Manor. The Tudor Barrington Court was the first country house acquired by the National Trust, in 1907, on the recommendation of the antiquarian Canon Hardwicke Rawnsley. Newton Surmaville was built between 1608 and 1612 for Robert Harbin, a Yeovil merchant, on the site of an earlier building, but was extensively altered and enhanced in the 1870s. Lytes Cary and its associated chapel and gardens have parts dating to as early as the 14th century. The architectural historian Nikolaus Pevsner praised it, saying "Yet all parts blend to perfection with one another and with the gentle sunny landscape that surrounds them." The 17th-century house at Tintinhull is surrounded by a small 20th-century Arts and Crafts garden. Ven House, which stands on an artificially raised terrace, has a rectangular plan of seven bays by five bays, and is built of red brick in Flemish bond, with local Hamstone dressings; its north and south fronts are divided by two giant Corinthian pilasters. The small William and Mary style house was completed sometime between 1698 and 1700. It was enlarged between 1725 and 1730 by Decimus Burton, who provided a new drawing-room for Sir W. Medleycott and also an orangery attached to the house. Brympton d'Evercy, built in stages between about 1220 and the 18th century, has been described, by Auberon Waugh, as "the most beautiful house in England".

=== Taunton Deane ===
The former district of Taunton Deane covers a population of approximately 100,000 in an area of 462 square kilometres (178 sq mi). It is centred on the town of Taunton, where around 60,000 of the population live and the council are based, and includes surrounding suburbs and villages. It had borough status.

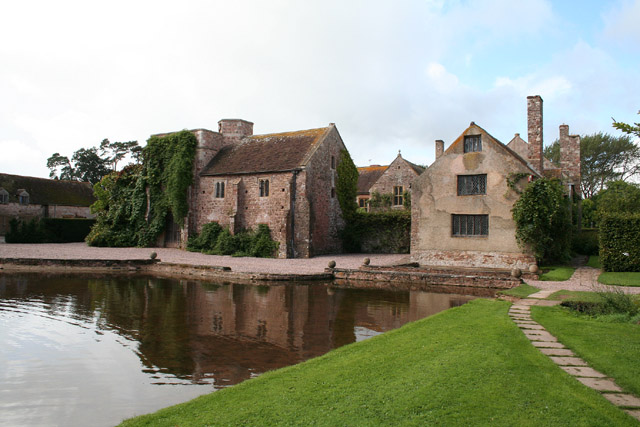
Cothay Manor was built around 1480, and was rated four stars in Simon Jenkins’ "England's Thousand Best Houses."

There are 38 Grade I listed buildings in Taunton Deane. The oldest buildings are churches built before the end of the 12th century, and the Castle Bow, which has been incorporated into the Castle Hotel in Taunton but was originally a gateway into Taunton Castle. The castle was created between 1107 and 1129, when William Giffard, the Chancellor of King Henry I, fortified the bishop's hall. Taunton is also the site of Gray's Almshouses, which dates from 1635, and two buildings in Fore Street from the 16th century. Many of the more recent structures in the list are manor houses such as Cothay Manor and Greenham Barton which were built in Stawley in the 15th century and 13th century respectively. Poundisford Park and Cothelstone Manor were both built in the 16th century and Hatch Court in 1755.

The most recent building included in the list is in the Quantock Hills. The original 16th century Hestercombe House, was rebuilt in 1909. In addition to being a listed building the estate is designated Grade I on the English Heritage Register of Parks and Gardens of Special Historic Interest in England. The house was used as the headquarters of the British 8th Corps in the Second World War, and has been owned by Somerset County Council since 1951. It is used as an administrative centre and is the current base for the Devon and Somerset Fire and Rescue Service.

=== West Somerset ===
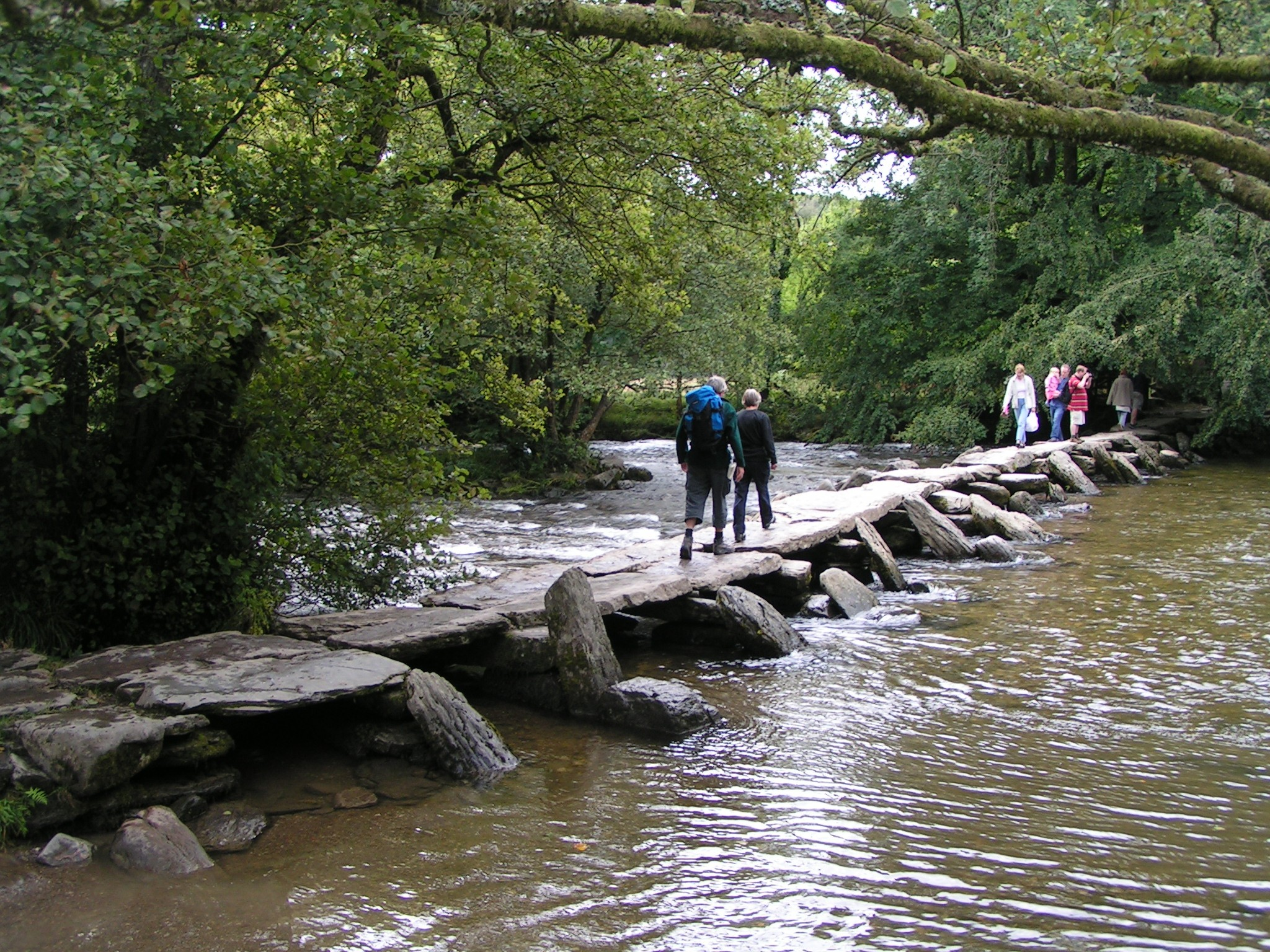
Tarr Steps a prehistoric clapper bridge across the River Barle in the Exmoor National Park.

The former West Somerset local government district covers a largely rural area, including parts of Exmoor, with a population, according to the 2011 census, of 35,300 in an area of 740 square kilometres (290 sq mi). The largest centres of population are the coastal towns of Minehead and Watchet. The council's administrative headquarters are in the village of Williton.

There are 33 Grade I listed buildings in West Somerset. The oldest is either Culbone Church, one of the smallest churches in England, and pre-Norman in origin, or Tarr Steps, which may originate in the Bronze Age, although other sources date them from around 1400. Dunster has the greatest concentration of Grade I listed buildings, including Dunster Castle, which was built in 1617 on a site which had supported a castle for the previous 600 years; the Yarn Market, which was built in 1609; Gallox Bridge, which dates from the 15th century and the Priory Church of St George which is predominately from the 15th century but includes part of the earlier church on the same site. Other sites include manor houses such as the medieval buildings at Nettlecombe Court and Orchard Wyndham.

== See also ==
- Grade II* listed buildings in Somerset
- Grade II* listed buildings in West Somerset
