= Hundred of Cannington =

Historical hundred of Somerset, England

Cannington Hundred
- Area
- 25,480 acres (10,310 ha)
- Status: Hundred
- Subdivisions
  - Type: Parishes
  - Units: Aisholt, Cannington, Charlinch (part), Chilton Trinity (part), Fiddington, Otterhampton, Over Stowey, Spaxton (part), Stockland Bristol, Stogursey (part), Stringston (part)

The Hundred of Cannington is one of the 40 historical Hundreds in the ceremonial county of Somerset, England, dating from before the Norman conquest during the Anglo-Saxon era although exact dates are unknown. Each hundred had a 'fyrd', which acted as the local defence force and a court which was responsible for the maintenance of the frankpledge system. They also formed a unit for the collection of taxes. The role of the hundred court was described in the Dooms (laws) of King Edgar. The name of the hundred was normally that of its meeting-place.

The hundred of Cannington was a relatively small hundred, covering approximately 25,480 acres (10,310 ha), that contained the parishes of Aisholt, Cannington, Fiddington, Otterhampton, Over Stowey and Stockland Bristol, and parts of Charlinch, Chilton Trinity, Spaxton, Stogursey and Stringston parishes.

The importance of the hundred courts declined from the seventeenth century. By the 19th century several different single-purpose subdivisions of counties, such as poor law unions, sanitary districts, and highway districts sprang up, filling the administrative role previously played by parishes and hundreds. Although the hundreds have never been formally abolished, their functions ended with the establishment of county courts in 1867 and the introduction of districts by the Local Government Act 1894.
