= Haygrove School =

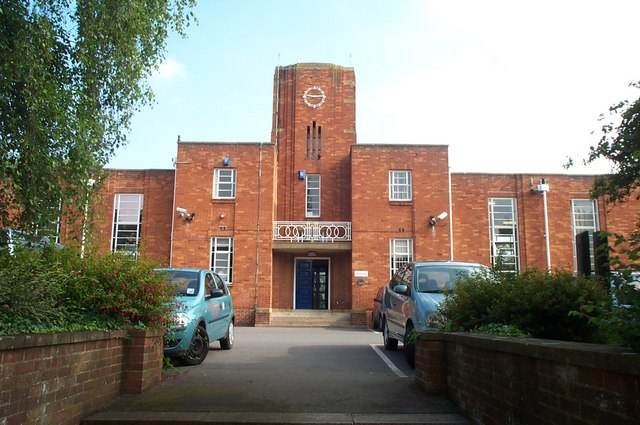

Location
- Durleigh Road; Bridgwater, Somerset, TA6 7HW; England
- Coordinates: 51.1230°N 3.0224°W

Information
- Type: Academy
- Motto: Opportunity, Endeavor, Achievement
- Specialist: Language College
- Department for Education URN: 136917 Tables
- Ofsted: Reports
- Head teacher: Aaron Reid
- Gender: Co-educational
- Age: 11 to 16
- Enrolment: 1,106 as of 2012
- Houses: Bonnington; Stephens; Hargreves; Mallory
- Colours: Red, White, and Black
- Website: http://www.haygroveschool.co.uk

Haygrove School is a co-educational secondary school in Bridgwater, Somerset, England, with 1,106 students aged between 11 and 16. It is located on Durleigh Road in Bridgwater.

== History ==
The site was originally the Poplar School of Engineering And Navigation, then Dr Morgan's Grammar School For Boys, and finally Bridgwater Grammar School For Boys, before becoming Haygrove School in the 1970s when Somerset County Council implemented comprehensive schools.

=== Building Schools for the Future (BSF) ===
In the 2000s, Bridgwater was the first town in the South West level to be selected for the UK government's Building Schools for the Future initiative, which aimed to rebuild and renew nearly every secondary school in England. Within Bridgwater, Building Schools for the Future was to develop four secondary schools - Chilton Trinity Technology College, Robert Blake Science College, East Bridgwater Community School and Haygrove School - along with two special provision schools, Elmwood School and Penrose School, at an expected cost of around £100 Million. However, in July 2010, several components of the scheme for Bridgwater schools were cancelled, including the plans for Haygrove School.

In early July 2011, the school became an academy. In 2017/18, the school became a Multi-Academy Trust.

=== Building safety issues ===
In 2020, as part of the Department for Education’s £3bn modular framework, set up to fast-track school construction projects, a new three-storey main school building was built at Haygrove School by Caledonian Modular, to a design by HLM Architects. In September 2022, a window collapsed, which prompted the school to close while safety inspections were carried out.

In August 2023, the school was forced to find alternative accommodation because of safety fears following technical investigations in the building. Similar problems had affected two other schools built by the same firm; education minister Nick Gibb said DfE inspectors had "identified issues that related to the structural integrity of the buildings, weakening its ability for example to withstand extreme events such as high winds or a big snowfall or indeed a collision from a vehicle." The DfE blamed poor workmanship for the structural issues; the school had not been built in accordance with its design. HLM had been involved with Haygrove School and Sir Frederick Gibberd College in Harlow, Essex. HLM said the firm had raised concerns with Caledonian's approach to the technical delivery of the designs; "Unable to resolve our differences, we parted company with Caledonian and the projects were delivered by others."

In December 2023, the DfE confirmed that Haygrove School would be demolished and rebuilt. Construction of the new school building is expected to start in 2026, with its completion predicted for 2028.

== Exam performance ==
Percentage of students achieving 5+A*-C including English and Mathematics at GCSE level

- 2013 - 76%
- 2014 - 71%
- 2015 - 77%
- 2016 - 69%

Percentage of students achieving 5+A*-C in any subject at GCSE level

- 1999 - 62%
- 2000 - 68%
- 2001 - 63%
- 2002 - 66%
- 2003 - 67%
- 2004 - 64%
- 2005 - 60%
- 2006 - 64%
- 2007 - 65%
- 2008 - 63%
- 2009 - 70%
- 2010 - 74%
- 2011 - 77%
- 2012 - 84%
- 2013 - 88%
- 2014 - 78%
- 2015 - 84%
- 2016 - 78%

== Notable pupils ==
- Chris Skidmore (born 1991), cricketer
