= Brymore Academy =

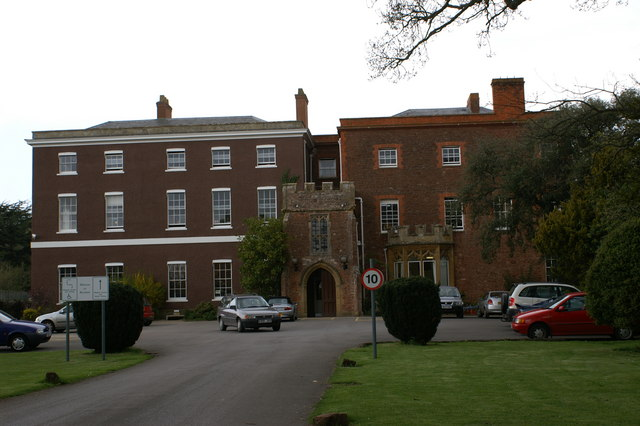

Location
- Cannington; Bridgwater, Somerset, TA5 2NB; England; 51.1489°N 3.0797°W

Information
- Type: Academy; Day & boarding school
- Established: 1951; 75 years ago
- Department for Education URN: 139655 Tables
- Ofsted: Reports
- Head teacher: Stefan McHale
- Gender: Boys
- Age: 11 to 16
- Enrolment: 346
- Website: brymoreacademy.co.uk

Brymore Academy (formerly Brymore School) is a boys' secondary school with academy status, located in Cannington, Bridgwater, Somerset, England. It is a day and boarding school for pupils aged 11 to 17 years and had 192 boys on the roll in 2015, 115 of them boarders. It was established in 1951 by Somerset County Council at a cost of £6,000 as a Secondary Technical School of Agriculture.

The school has a farm, walled garden, greenhouses and workshops including a foundry and forge. The farm includes a dairy herd, beef animals, sows, poultry and a flock of ewes with lambs.

Brymore offers extra-curricular activities including beekeeping, canoeing and cycling. The school is expanding to take in Year 7s. The school will continue to enter boys in Year 9, provided there are sufficient places available.

The main school building incorporates parts of a medieval house which was owned by John Pym who, during the English Civil War played a role in bringing about the downfall of Charles I. In World War II girls of Malvern College were evacuated to Brymore. In 1943 the 535th Automatic Weapons battalion of the United States Army was billeted in the house and grounds while they prepared for D-Day. The building is designated as a Grade II listed building. The boarding houses included the Grade I listed Cannington Court.

The buildings and grounds of Brymore Academy are used annually during the summer break for 3 "Venture" camps called Brymore 1, 2, and 3.

== Alumni ==
- Neil Parish: former MP
