= Church of the Holy Trinity, Chilton Trinity =

Church in Somerset, England

Church of the Holy Trinity
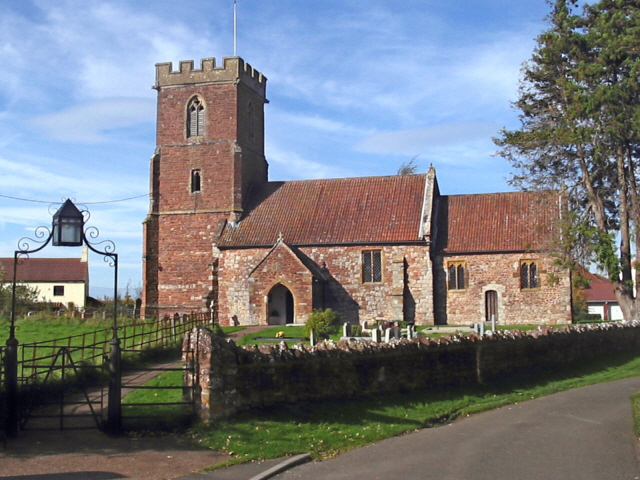

- Location within Somerset
- 51.1474°N 3.0072°W
- Location: Chilton Trinity, Somerset, England

Listed Building – Grade II*
- Official name: Church of the Holy Trinity
- Designated: 29 March 1963
- Reference no.: 1264231

The Anglican Church of the Holy Trinity at Chilton Trinity in the English county of Somerset was established in the 13th century. It is a Grade II* listed building.

== History ==
Parts of the fabric of the building, including the arch of the south doorway, are from the 11th century, although there is some disagreement about the specific dates for parts of the building. The building was restored in the 15th and 19th centuries. The tower was added in the 15th century.

The parish is part of the benefice of Bridgwater St Mary and Chilton Trinity within the Diocese of Bath and Wells.

== Architecture ==
The church consists of a two-bay nave, chancel and south porch with a three-stage west tower, which is supported by diagonal buttresses. The tower holds five bells.

Inside the church is a 15th century font.

== See also ==
- List of ecclesiastical parishes in the Diocese of Bath and Wells
