= Chris Skidmore (cricketer) =

English cricketer (born 1991)

Personal information
- Full name: Christopher James (Desmond) Skidmore
- Born: 22 April 1991 (age 35); Taunton, Somerset, England
- Nickname: Skiddy, Whiff, Des,
- Batting: Right-handed
- Bowling: Right-arm fast-medium

Domestic team information
- Years: Team
- 2010: Wiltshire

Career statistics
Competition	List A
Matches	3
Runs scored	0
Batting average	–
100s/50s	–/–
Top score	0*
Balls bowled	144
Wickets	5
Bowling average	24.00
5 wickets in innings	–
10 wickets in match	–
Best bowling	2/33
Catches/stumpings	–/–
- Source: Cricinfo, 21 February 2019

Christopher James Skidmore (born 22 April 1991) is an English former cricketer.

Skidmore was born at Taunton and was educated at Haygrove School in Bridgwater. He played minor counties cricket for Wiltshire in 2010, making three appearances in the Minor Counties Championship. Skidmore was later selected in the Unicorns squad for the 2013 Yorkshire Bank 40. He made his List A one-day debut during the tournament against Middlesex at Lord's, with Skidmore playing in two further matches against Yorkshire and Leicestershire. In these three matches, he took five wickets with right-arm fast-medium bowling, with best figures of 2 for 33. He played Second XI cricket for Somerset and Gloucestershire in 2014, but was unable to establish himself with either county. Outside of playing Skidmore works as a cricket coach.
