= Walter Shuldham =

English cricketer

Personal information
- Full name: Walter Frank Quantock Shuldham
- Born: 17 June 1892; Stoke-sub-Hamdon, Somerset, England
- Died: 7 February 1971 (aged 78); Stoke-sub-Hamdon, Somerset, England
- Batting: Right-handed
- Role: Batsman

Domestic team information
- Years: Team
- 1914–1924: Somerset
- First-class debut: 27 July 1914 Somerset v Yorkshire
- Last First-class: 27 November 1926 Rajputana and Central India v Marylebone Cricket Club (MCC)

Career statistics
Competition	First-class
Matches	8
Runs scored	126
Batting average	10.50
100s/50s	–/–
Top score	25
Balls bowled	–
Wickets	–
Bowling average	–
5 wickets in innings	–
10 wickets in match	–
Best bowling	–
Catches/stumpings	–/–
- Source: CricketArchive, 26 March 2011

Walter Frank Quantock Shuldham (17 June 1892 – 7 February 1971) played first-class cricket for Somerset in 1914 and 1924. He later played in two first-class matches in India. He was born and died at Stoke-sub-Hamdon, Somerset.

== Cricket career ==
Shuldham was the only son of the lord of the manor at Norton Manor, Norton-sub-Hamdon. He was educated at Marlborough College, where he was an opening or middle order right-handed batsman. He played for Somerset in two matches in a week just before the start of the First World War in 1914 with no success, and then reappeared in four further matches in 1924. His highest score, however, was only 25, made in a 1924 match against Worcestershire. He did not improve on this in two first-class matches for scratch Indian teams against the MCC side that toured India in 1926-27.

== Military career ==
Shuldham was commissioned into the West Somerset Yeomanry as a Second Lieutenant on 29 August 1914 and was promoted a temporary Lieutenant on 10 December 1915. He was seconded (on probation) to the Indian Army as a Lieutenant on 15 March 1917 and was posted to the 104th Wellesley's Rifles. He would have served with them in Mesopotamia. Between 22 July 1917 and 5 November 1917, and again from 30 November 1917 to 7 December 1918 he held the rank of acting Captain, often commanding a company. He was admitted to the Indian Army on 3 April 1918. He was promoted Captain 19 May 1919 and served in South Persia in 1919-20. He was appointed to the Indian Political Department on 25 May 1920 and remained with them for the rest of his time in the Indian Army. He was promoted to Major on 19 May 1933 and retired from the army on 17 March 1935. In retirement, he was appointed High Sheriff of Somerset for 1954. He died at his home at East Stoke House in Stoke-sub-Hamdon where the Shuldham family still (as of 2011) runs an organic fruit-growing business.

== Personal life ==
Shuldham married Doris Elizabeth Vaughan in 1920 and had four sons (one of whom was killed in the Second World War).
