= Cannington Priory =

Benedictine nunnery in Somerset, England

Coordinates: 51.1504°N 3.0627°W

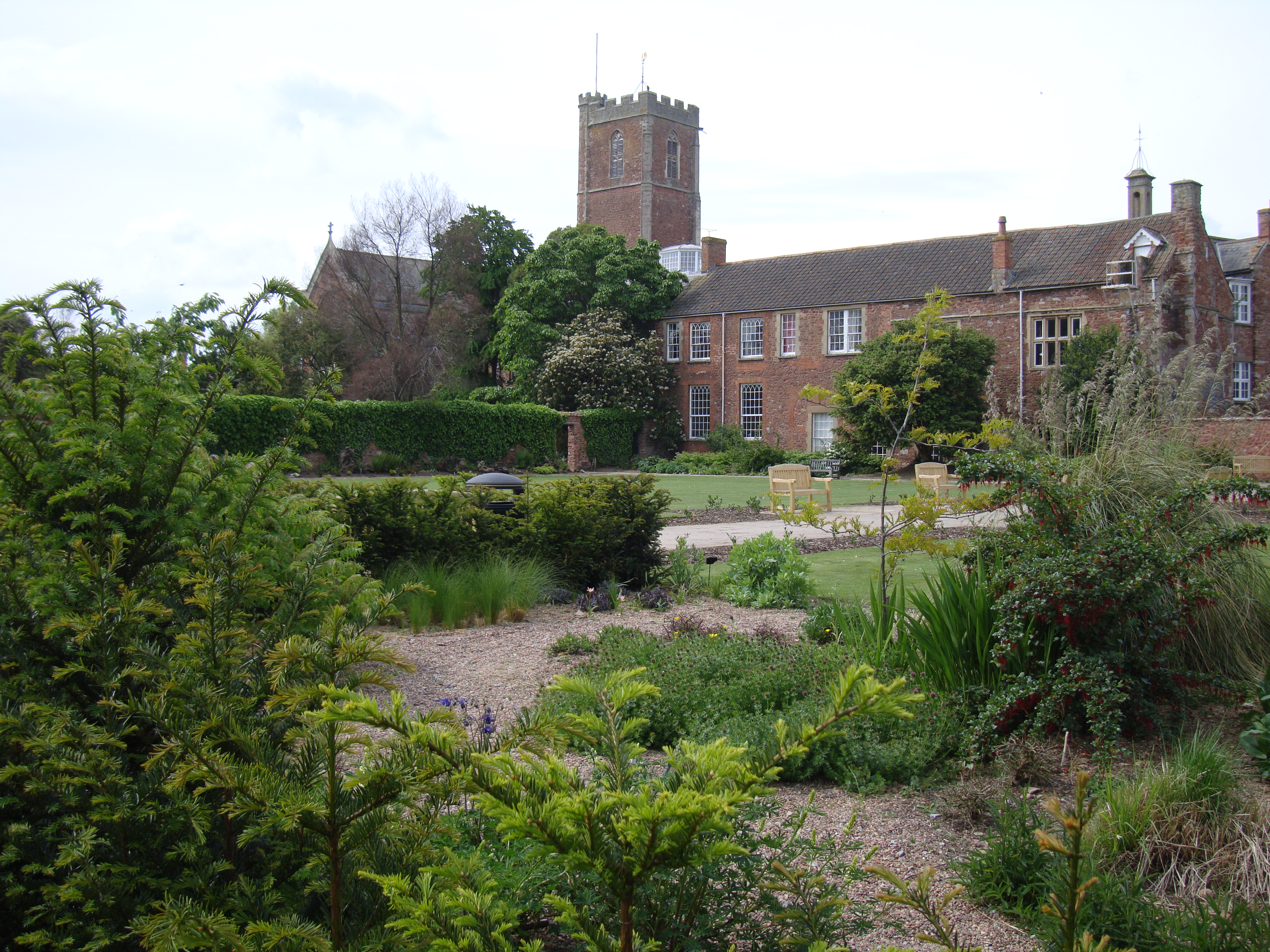

Monastery information
- Order: Benedictine
- Established: c. 1138
- Disestablished: 1536

People
- Founder(s): Roger de Curci

Site
- Location: Cannington, Somerset, England
- Grid reference: ST257396

Cannington Priory shown within Somerset
(grid reference ST257396)

Cannington Priory was a Benedictine nunnery established around 1138 and dissolved in 1536 in Cannington, Somerset, England.

It was attached to the Church of St Mary.

It was first populated by Benedictine nuns (from Dorset), who were later transferred to Colwich Abbey. The building was converted into a mansion but later reverted to being a nunnery. It was disestablished as part of the Dissolution of the Monasteries in 1536.

Cannington Court incorporates some of the remains.
