= Owen Staples =

English-born Canadian artist (1866–1949)

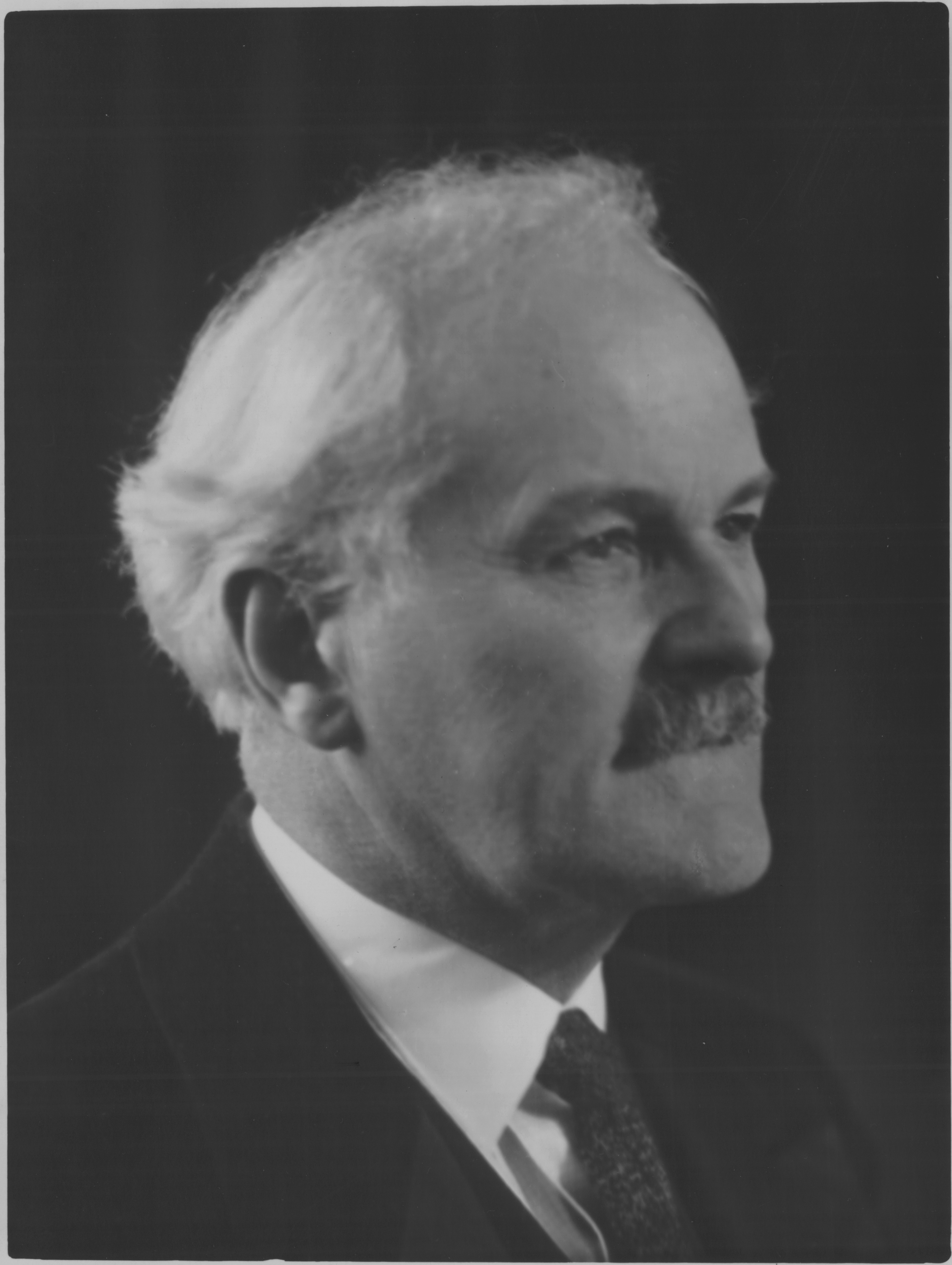
- Born: Owen Staples; September 3, 1866; Stoke-sub-Hamdon, Somerset, England
- Died: December 6, 1949 (aged 83)
- Other name: Poe Staples
- Education: Pennsylvania Academy of the Fine Arts
- Occupations: Painter, printmaker, illustrator, cartoonist, naturalist, writer, musician

Owen 'Poe' Staples (born Owen Staples, September 3, 1866 – December 6, 1949) was an English-born Canadian painter, etcher, pastelist, political cartoonist, writer, musician, and naturalist.

== Early life and training ==
Owen Staples was born on September 3, 1866, in Stoke-sub-Hamdon, Somerset, England. The Staples' family arrived in Hamilton, Ontario from Stoke-sub-Hamdon in 1872. Abandoned by their father, the family moved to Rochester, New York, United States in 1876. After Staples' mother died in 1881, he was hired as a messenger boy at the Rochester Art Club where he was given the nickname Poe.

There he began his art training with Horatio Walker and Harvey Ellis. In 1885, after nine years in the United States, Staples moved to Toronto to study with George Agnew Reid. That same year, he was hired by John Ross Robertson, founder of the Toronto Telegram. Granted a leave of absence by Robertson, Staples moved to Philadelphia in 1886 for two years of study with Thomas Eakins and Thomas Pollock Anshutz at the Pennsylvania Academy of the Fine Arts.

== Professional career ==
From 1888 to 1908, Staples worked for the Telegram as a staff artist, reporter, and political cartoonist, and illustrator for the J. Ross Robertson Collection. The Battle of York is an example from this collection. Thereafter, Staples became a well-known artist, illustrating a number of books, executing commissioned murals, and producing a vast oeuvre of paintings, watercolours and etchings. Robertson also commissioned Staples to paint several large canvases of historical subjects. Seven of these works now hang in Toronto's New City Hall. He continued to write and illustrate numerous articles for the Telegram on various topics.

In 1946, he lost the use of his right hand in what may have been a stroke. But he learned to make art using his left hand. He died in 1949.

== Possible association with Tom Thomson ==
Postcard featuring Staples in the Don valley circa 1909

In 1905, Tom Thomson collected specimens for his cousin Dr. William Brodie. Brodie was the director of Biology at the Ontario Provincial Museum, the precursor of the Royal Ontario Museum. Brodie and Staples frequently explored the Don River valley together and young Thomson may have accompanied them. Thomson scholar Joan Murray wrote: "He [Thomson] spent much of his time on walks with his grandmother's first cousin, Dr. William Brodie, a well known entomologist, ornithologist and botanist." "Thomson also learned from Brodie how to collect specimens; as a young man, he accompanied his relative on collecting trips." Staples, who was rarely without his paintbox easel, illustrated treatises for Brodie who consulted on natural history articles written for the Telegram by Staples. Thomson, who was artistic but inexperienced, may have been intrigued by Staples, a master watercolourist, who made every effort to 'catch the light' with his quickly rendered pictures.

Researcher Angie Littlefield, who has studied Thomson's Toronto years, stated:

"Also in Brodie's circle was Owen Staples who lived across from the Brodies on the east side of the Don River.... Staples was a founding member of the Toronto Mendelssohn Choir and a magnet for artists of all kinds. Whenever possible, Tom, who loved music, attended the choir’s concerts or gave tickets to relatives so that they too could enjoy the finest choral music Toronto had to offer. ...and Staples [was a key figure] in the intellectual life of the Brodie home and thus by extension, a major influence on Tom."

== Association with the Group of Seven ==
A. J. Casson wrote:

"Owen Staples was the first professional artist I met in Toronto in 1916. I was a lad of 18 and he kindly helped to provide me with an entrée to the local art scene. I joined the Arts and Letters Club of Toronto in 1920, when Vincent Massey was president. Owen Staples was a staunch supporter of the club and very active. Many good times were spent at 69 Hogarth Avenue, in Toronto's east end, a favorite meeting place for artists, musicians, writers, etc."

The "Studio", completed in 1904, was designed by Staples and artist C.W. Jefferys in an Arts and Crafts style. Over the years, Staples held an open house on Sundays which attracted a lively cross-section of Toronto society. Regular visitors included the artists who would become the Group of Seven and other members of the Arts and Letters Club. Visitors included opera star Bertha May Crawford, architect Eden Smith, banker and art patron Sir Byron Edmund Walker who purchased many of Staples' works, the celebrated cellist Leo Smith and a host of other artists, poets, writers, educators, ministers, musicians, politicians and bankers. Perhaps the most enigmatic visitor was William Leonard Hunt, also known as The Great Farini, who pitched a tent in the backyard and stayed for the summer. In later years, Staples' son Will and his close friend Charles Comfort attracted a younger generation of Toronto's arts community. The weekly open house gradually petered out after the untimely death of Will Staples in 1929.

== Public collections ==
- Art Gallery of Ontario
- City of Toronto Archives
- Library and Archives Canada
- McCord Museum
- National Gallery of Canada
- Queen's University
- Royal Ontario Museum
- Toronto Public Library
- University of Toronto

== Exhibitions ==
- 1880 1st Rochester Art Club Exhibition, Rochester, New York, US
- 1888–1948 Royal Canadian Academy, Toronto, Ontario
- 1889–1948 Ontario Society of Artists, Toronto, Ontario
- 1893 World's Columbian Exposition, Chicago, Illinois, US
- 1894 California Midwinter International Exposition of 1894, San Francisco, USA
- 1901 Pan-American Exposition, Buffalo, New York, US
- 1904 Louisiana Purchase Exposition, St Louis, Missouri, US
- 1910, 1939 Walker Art Gallery, Liverpool, UK
- 1915 Panama–Pacific International Exposition, San Francisco, US
- 1933–1938 The Royal Scottish Society of Painters in Watercolour, Glasgow, UK
- 1939 Exhibition of Water Colours By Canadian Artists, Gloucester, UK
- 1944–1945 The Exhibition of Contemporary Canadian Painting, Rio de Janeiro and São Paulo, Brazil
- 1977 Royal Ontario Museum, Canadiana Gallery, Toronto, Ontario, posthumous retrospective exhibition
- 1996 Owen Staples: A Retrospective, Market Gallery, Toronto, Ontario, posthumous retrospective exhibition

== Book illustrations ==
- Robertson, John Ross. Landmarks of Toronto. Vol. 1: 1792–1893, 1894. Vol. 2: 1834–1895, 1896. Vol. 3: 1834–1898, 1898. Vol. 4: 1834–1904, 1904. Vol. 5: 1834–1908. Vol. 6: 1834–1914, 1914.
- Simcoe, Elizabeth Posthuma. The Dairy of Mrs. John Graves Simcoe. Toronto: William Briggs, 1911.
- Snider, C.H.J. The Story of the 'Nancy' and Other Eighteen-Twelvers. Toronto: McClelland & Stewart, 1926.
- Torontonensis. Yearbooks 1930–1934.
- Hathaway E.J. Jesse Ketchum and His Times. Toronto: McClelland & Stewart, 1929
- Trail, Catherine Parr. The Backwoods of Canada. Toronto: McClelland & Stewart, 1929.
- Pierce, Lorne. William Kirby: The Portrait of a Tory Loyalist. Toronto: Macmillan Company of Canada, 1929.
- Middleton, J.E. The Romance of Ontario. Toronto: Gage, 1931.
- Moore, Kathleen, and Jessie McEwen. A Picture History of Canada. Toronto: Thomas Nelson & Sons, 1942.

== Notes ==
- A Dictionary of Canadian Artists, volumes 1-8 by Colin S. MacDonald, and volume 9 (online only), by Anne Newlands and Judith Parker
- archive.org/
- Artist's Documentation File, National Gallery of Canada Library and Archives
- Tom Thomson at The Canadian Encyclopedia, accessed September 4, 2019
- Canadian Who's Who. Vol. 2. London: Times Publishing Co., 1936
- Staples, Rod. "Owen Staples, Painter of Canada's Past". The Beaver, February–March, 1992
- Staples, Rod and Ian Galt. Owen Staples: Painter of Canada's Past. Scarborough: Hogarth Press, 1998.
- Toronto Public Library, John Ross Robertson Collection. Historicity: Toronto Then and Now, website, http://www.torontopubliclibrary.ca (accessed January 11, 2008).
- Tovell, Rosemarie L. A New Class of Art, The Artist's Print in Canadian Art, 1877–1920. Ottawa: National Gallery of Canada, 1996.
