= North Hill House School =

Location
- Fromefield; Frome, Somerset, BA11 2HB; England; 51.2355°N 2.3156°W

Information
- Type: Day and residential
- Motto: n/a
- Established: 1999
- Department for Education URN: 131975 Tables
- Principal: James Lynch
- Gender: Male and Female
- Age: 7 to 16
- Enrolment: 90

North Hill House School, also referred to as NHH, is an independent specialist school in Frome, Somerset, England for children and young people with Autism Spectrum Condition between the ages of 7 and 16. Owned by the Aspris Children's Services, North Hill House opened in September 1999. It has been approved by the Department for Children, Schools and Families under Section 348(1) of the Education Act 1996.

There are around 60 staff members working in the school. The Executive Principal of both North Hill House is Justin Davey and Head Teacher is James Lynch.

The school has a full therapy team consisting of Occupational Therapy, Speech and Language Therapy and counselling.

== History ==
Prior to its current state, North Hill House's original building had become Farleigh sixth form further education college. The specialist school's current building was originally an open-plan office, owned by another company. In 2002, the building was bought by The Priory Healthcare Group and was changed into a school. The new North Hill house was opened by late 2003. During 2009, the school buildings were enlarged by incorporating a listed building, Stoneleigh House, on the same site.

== Campus ==
The School is situated a few hundred metres from the centre of Frome. The school moved to a new, purpose-built site – only a few yards away – in September 2003. The old building is now Farleigh sixth form further education college, also owned by The Priory Healthcare Group.

=== Expansion ===
The school has recently expanded into Stoneleigh House, a Grade II listed building built in the early 19th century, where the offices were situated. In September 2008, Stonleigh was renovated and many of the rooms were converted into classrooms. The main offices still remain on the first floor however.

== Facilities ==
In addition to classrooms, North Hill House contains an Occupational Therapy room, in which students with problems such as developmental co-ordination disorder can be given specialist help, from a qualified member of staff. For use with all pupils, the specialist school contains two 'time out' rooms, in which students can reside if they feel stressed. The first is a 'soft' room, which is covered in blue foam, (The Blue Room), and the second is a room with a sofa for students to discuss any problems they may have.

=== Subjects ===
North Hill House covers many subjects for GCSE. In addition to the standard subjects, the specialist school can give other specialist lessons including the following:

- DiDA (ICT)
- Literacy
- Numeracy
- Speech and Language Therapy (SALT)
- Occupational Therapy (OT)

== Mission statement ==
Mission Statement 'The fostering of a responsible, positive outlook on life and achievement through the provision of an appropriate and stimulating educational environment.'

Purpose – North Hill House aims:

- To develop and enhance abilities, giving appropriate guidance with realistic expectations.
- To plan flexible and varied individual education programmes promoting academic and life skills in a supportive learning community.
- To manage behaviour consistently, clearly defining rules and boundaries and using rewards and sanctions to demonstrate the consequences of actions.
- To help students develop strategies to cope with conflict, anger, stress and anxiety.
- To motivate students to assert themselves in a positive way while respecting the rights and sensibilities of others.
- To encourage interaction with others, promoting participation and teamwork and building self-esteem and self-reliance through a broad range of approaches.
- To promote awareness of self and others by developing relationship-building and communication skills; thus helping students to recognise and share feelings, and by offering spiritual and moral guidance.
- To demonstrate the importance of acceptable and appropriate behaviour, including equal opportunities issues.
- To build and develop a partnership with the wider community.
- To develop positive links with the local community.
