= Chilton Trinity =

Village and civil parish in Somerset, England

Coordinates: 51.148°N 3.007°W

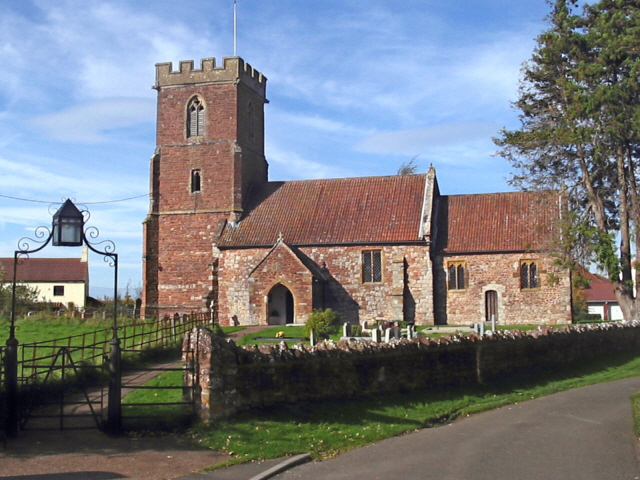
- Chilton Trinity Church

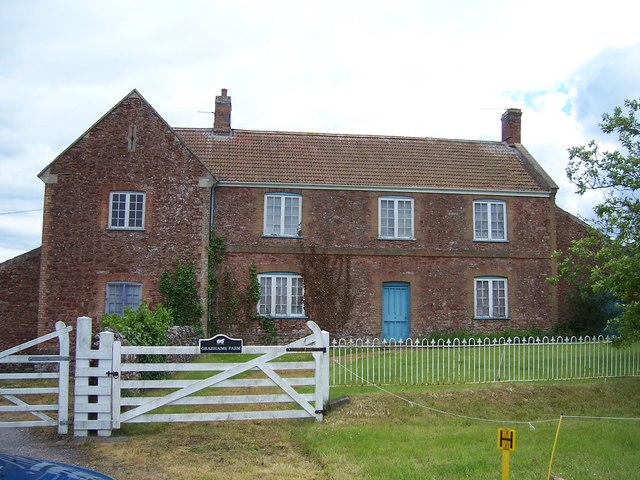
- Grabham Farm

- Location within Somerset
- Population: 260 (2011)
- OS grid reference: ST295395
- Unitary authority: Somerset Council
- Ceremonial county: Somerset
- Region: South West
- Country: England
- Sovereign state: United Kingdom
- Post town: BRIDGWATER
- Postcode district: TA5, TA6
- Dialling code: 01278
- Police: Avon and Somerset
- Fire: Devon and Somerset
- Ambulance: South Western
- UK Parliament: Bridgwater

Chilton Trinity is a village and civil parish on the River Parrett, 2 miles (3 km) north of Bridgwater in Somerset, England.

== History ==
Iron Age and Roman pottery have been found at Chilton village. The name Chilton implies a settlement for younger sons.

At one time Chilton Trinity was part of the hundred of Andersfield, but in another era it was part of the hundred of Cannington.

In 2023, work started at the eastern edge of the village on a tidal barrier over the River Parrett.

== Governance ==
The parish council has responsibility for local issues, including setting an annual precept (local rate) to cover the council's operating costs and producing annual accounts for public scrutiny. The parish council evaluates local planning applications and works with the local police, district council officers, and neighbourhood watch groups on matters of crime, security, and traffic. The parish council's role also includes initiating projects for the maintenance and repair of parish facilities, as well as consulting with the district council on the maintenance, repair, and improvement of highways, drainage, footpaths, public transport, and street cleaning. Conservation matters (including trees and listed buildings) and environmental issues are also the responsibility of the council.

For local government purposes, since 1 April 2023, the village comes under the unitary authority of Somerset Council. Prior to this, it was part of the non-metropolitan district of Sedgemoor, which was formed on 1 April 1974 under the Local Government Act 1972, having previously been part of Bridgwater Rural District.

It is also part of the Bridgwater county constituency represented in the House of Commons of the Parliament of the United Kingdom. It elects one Member of Parliament (MP) by the first past the post system of election, and was part of the South West England constituency of the European Parliament prior to Britain leaving the European Union in January 2020, which elected seven MEPs using the d'Hondt method of party-list proportional representation.

== Education ==
The village is home to Chilton Trinity School a specialist technology college for pupils aged 11–16.

== Religious sites ==
The Church of the Holy Trinity was established in the 13th century, but the current building dates from the 15th century with 19th-century renovation and has been designated by English Heritage as a grade II* listed building.
