= Gurney Manor =

Manor house in Cannington, Somerset, England

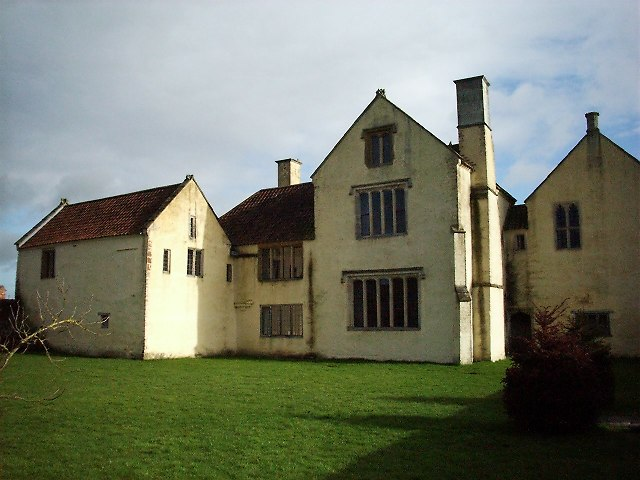

- Location within Somerset

General information
- Architectural style: Medieval (with 15th-century additions)
- Location: Cannington, Somerset, England
- Coordinates: 51.1499°N 3.0559°W
- Completed: 13th century
- Owner: Landmark Trust

Design and construction
- Designations: Grade I Listed Building

Gurney Manor in Cannington, Somerset, England is a 13th-century manor house with an attached chapel wing. It is now supported by the Landmark Trust and is available as holiday accommodation. It has been designated as a Grade I listed building and is considered notable partly due to the substantial survival of medieval construction throughout.

The first building on the site was an open hall house erected before 1350. It was rebuilt around 1400 with various additions during the 15th century. William Dodisham added the south wing, porch, and kitchen and put in new windows. In 1480 he left it to his niece Agnes, who married local landowner Walter Michael. In 1539 Agnes's grandson, Thomas Michel, murdered his wife and sister in law before killing himself. The family of the murdered women had stripped the house of its furniture and the farm of its livestock. As the Crown believed it had a claim to these, the case was taken to the Court of Star Chamber meaning that records were preserved.

The Michels owned and improved the manor until 1616. It then became a farmhouse often inhabited by tenants until the early 20th century. In these 300 years the property enjoyed few improvements but nonetheless suffered few fundamental alterations. In World War II the house was divided into flats by a Mr Harris, whose descendants sold it to the Landmark Trust in the 1980s. The interior includes the remnants of a 17th-century strapwork plaster ceiling.

Restoration work in the late 20th century included the repair of structural problems as well as the construction of new oak roof trusses made in a traditional fashion with an adze.

== See also ==
- List of Grade I listed buildings in Sedgemoor
