= Stoke-sub-Hamdon =

Village and civil parish in Somerset, England

Coordinates: 50.9545°N 2.7488°W

Stoke sub Hamdon
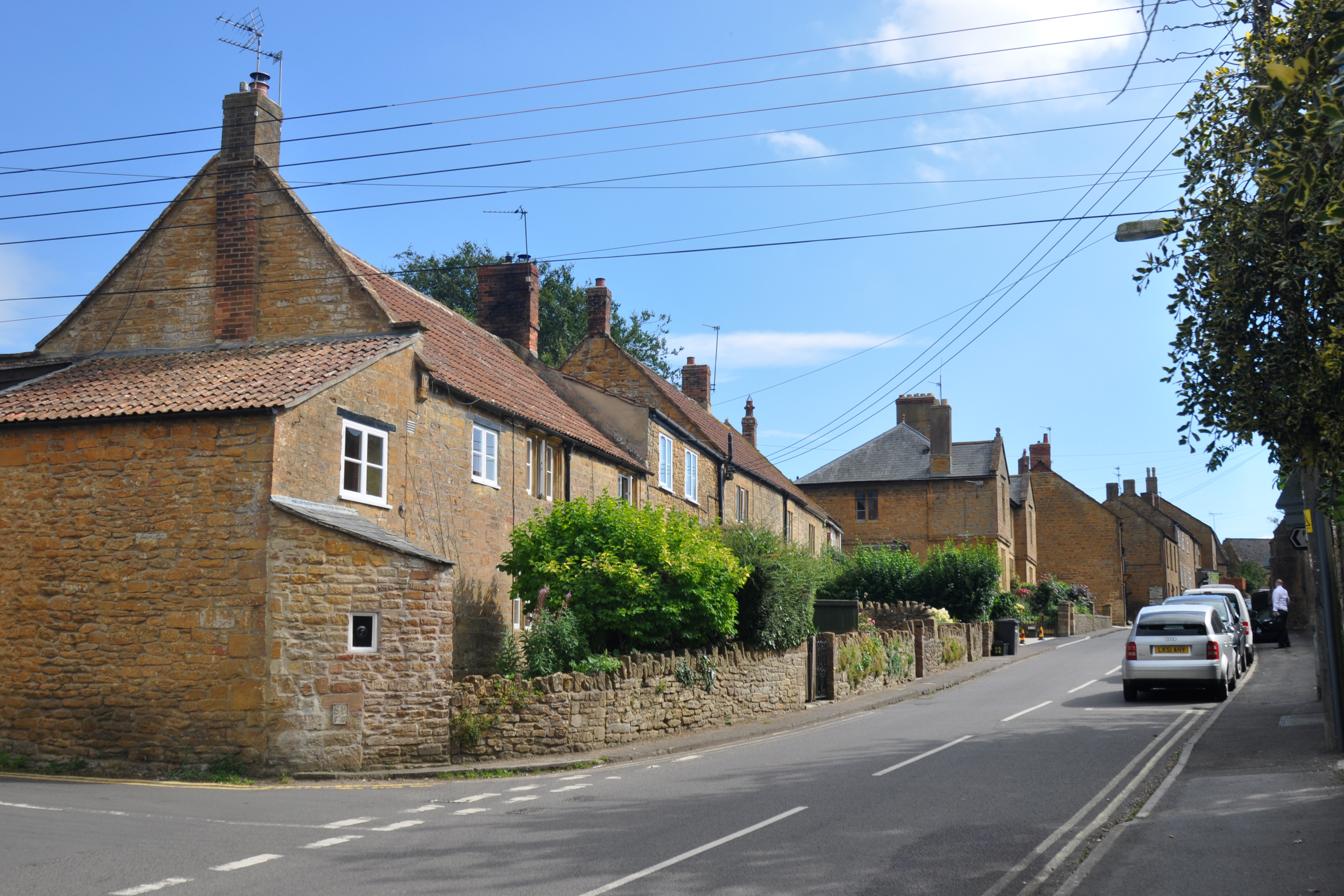
- North Street

- Location within Somerset
- Population: 1,968 (2011)
- OS grid reference: ST475175
- Unitary authority: Somerset Council
- Ceremonial county: Somerset
- Region: South West
- Country: England
- Sovereign state: United Kingdom
- Post town: STOKE-SUB-HAMDON
- Postcode district: TA14
- Dialling code: 01935
- Police: Avon and Somerset
- Fire: Devon and Somerset
- Ambulance: South Western
- UK Parliament: Glastonbury and Somerton

Stoke-sub-Hamdon (or Stoke sub Hamdon), also known as Stoke under Ham, is a large village and civil parish in Somerset, England. It is situated 5 miles (8 km) west of Yeovil, with which it is linked by the A3088 road. The parish is located near the River Parrett, and includes the village of East Stoke.

== History ==
The village stretches around Ham Hill which is a geological Site of Special Scientific Interest (SSSI), Iron Age hillfort, Roman site and country park. The hill has given its name to the distinctive quarried hamstone which is quarried from a ridge of sandy limestone rock that is elevated above the lower lying clay vales and nearby Somerset Levels. It is of particular importance to geologists because of the assemblages of fossils which it contains, the sedimentary features which it displays and the way it relates to other rocks of equivalent age in the close vicinity. The Bronze Age and Iron Age hillfort was occupied by the Durotriges tribe. A Roman milestone was found at Venn Bridge in 1930: apparently it was made as an element in a colonnade and afterwards converted to a milestone inscribed with the name of the emperor Flavius Severus who ruled in 305–306 CE.

In the 10th century the estate passed to Glastonbury Abbey, but after the Norman Conquest was held by Robert, Count of Mortain and granted to Robert "the Constable" FitzIvo. It then passed down through the Beauchamps of Hatch, becoming known as Stoke Beauchamp. It was acquired by the Duchy of Cornwall in 1443 and is still held by the Duchy. The parish of Stoke was part of Tintinhull Hundred.

The village is the site of the 14th-century Stoke sub Hamdon Priory which is a former priests' house of the chantry chapel of St Nicholas, which was destroyed after the dissolution of the monasteries. The priory has been owned by the National Trust since 1946, and designated by English Heritage as a Grade I listed building.

== Governance ==
The parish council has responsibility for local issues, including setting an annual precept (local rate) to cover the council's operating costs and producing annual accounts for public scrutiny. The parish council evaluates local planning applications and works with the local police, district council officers, and neighbourhood watch groups on matters of crime, security, and traffic. The parish council's role also includes initiating projects for the maintenance and repair of parish facilities, as well as consulting with the district council on the maintenance, repair, and improvement of highways, drainage, footpaths, public transport, and street cleaning. Conservation matters (including trees and listed buildings) and environmental issues are also the responsibility of the council.

For local government purposes, since 1 April 2023, the parish comes under the unitary authority of Somerset Council. Prior to this, it was part of the non-metropolitan district of South Somerset (established under the Local Government Act 1972). It was part of Yeovil Rural District before 1974.

The village is in 'Hamdon' electoral ward. The ward stretches south to Norton-sub-Hamdon. The total ward population taken at the 2011 census was 2,711.

It is also part of the Glastonbury and Somerton county constituency represented in the House of Commons of the Parliament of the United Kingdom. It elects one Member of Parliament (MP) by the first-past-the-post system of election.

== Religious sites ==
The church, dedicated to St Mary the Virgin, dates from the 12th century, and has a tower and six bells. It shows various medieval carvings including abstract corbels, an astrological tympanum, and St Michael slaying the dragon. Two of the carvings are thought to be sheela na gigs. The village's now-redundant United Reformed Church was opened in 1866 and closed in 2017. It is a Grade II* listed building.

== Education ==
Secondary education for pupils between 11 and 16 is provided at Stanchester Academy, and Norton-sub-Hamdon primary school for reception to year 6, and Castle Primary School in Stoke-sub-Hamdon itself, for reception to year 6.

== Notable residents ==
- Walter Shuldham (1892–1971) – professional cricketer and soldier
- Owen Staples (1866–1949) – Canadian painter, born here
- F. H. S. Shepherd (1877–1948), painter born in the village
- Jordan Storey (born 1997) – professional footballer
