= St Mary's Church, Cannington =

Church in Somerset, England

Church of St Mary
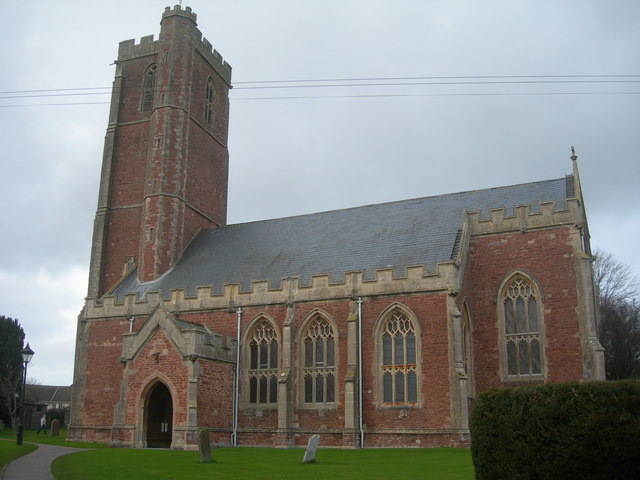

- Location within Somerset

General information
- Location: Cannington, England
- Coordinates: 51.1502°N 3.0624°W
- Completed: 15th century

The Church of St Mary is the parish church of Cannington, Somerset, England. The parish is in the Church of England Diocese of Bath and Wells.

== Church building ==
The church has a tower which dates from the 14th century, the remainder was rebuilt in the early 15th century and restored in 1840 by Richard Carver. It has been designated as a Grade I listed building.

The nave was built between 1375 and 1400, however the tower remains from the previous church. The pulpit is from the 15th century. Burials and memorials in the church are to the family of John Pym.

== Church history ==
The church was linked to Cannington Priory from the Middle Ages. After the dissolution of the monasteries, the living was under the patronage of the manor of Cannington. In 1685, it was held by Elizabeth, Baroness Clifford, later by Oxford University, and eventually by the Bishop of Bath and Wells.

It was previously connected to Cannington Court and is postulated as the former church of a house of Benedictine Nuns. The nuns arrived in Cannington after fleeing from the French Revolution.

The parish is part of the benefice of Cannington, Otterhampton, Combwich and Stockland within the Quantock deanery.

== See also ==
- Grade I listed buildings in Sedgemoor
- List of Somerset towers
- List of ecclesiastical parishes in the Diocese of Bath and Wells
