= Stanchester Academy =

Location
- Montacute Road; Stoke-sub-Hamdon, Somerset; England
- Coordinates: 50.9541°N 2.7278°W

Information
- Type: Academy
- Established: 1940
- Department for Education URN: 137080 Tables
- Chairman: -
- Head teacher: Gregg Mockridge
- Age: 11 to 16
- Enrolment: 791
- Website: http://www.stanchester-academy.co.uk

Stanchester Academy, formerly Stanchester Community School, is an academy for children between the ages of 11 and 16 in Stoke-sub-Hamdon, Somerset, England. As of September 2021 it had 791 students.

== Transport ==
Somerset County Council provides free transport for students in Years 7 – 11 to attend their catchment or nearest appropriate school and they live more than 3 miles shortest available walking distance from home to Stanchester Academy. This is run by the School Transport Department which organises the routes and contract buses. It is possible for other students to apply for a spare seat on a contract bus operated by Somerset School Transport.

== History ==
The neo-Georgian main school building was completed in 1940. Stanchester Academy was originally a "Secondary Modern" School, becoming a "Comprehensive" School in 1974 as a result of the abandonment of Grammar School education in the Yeovil area, by then the Conservatives controlled Somerset County Council. In August 2011, the school became an academy.

== Notable alumni ==
- Adam Dance, businessman, politician and Minister of Parliament.
