= Chilton Trinity School =

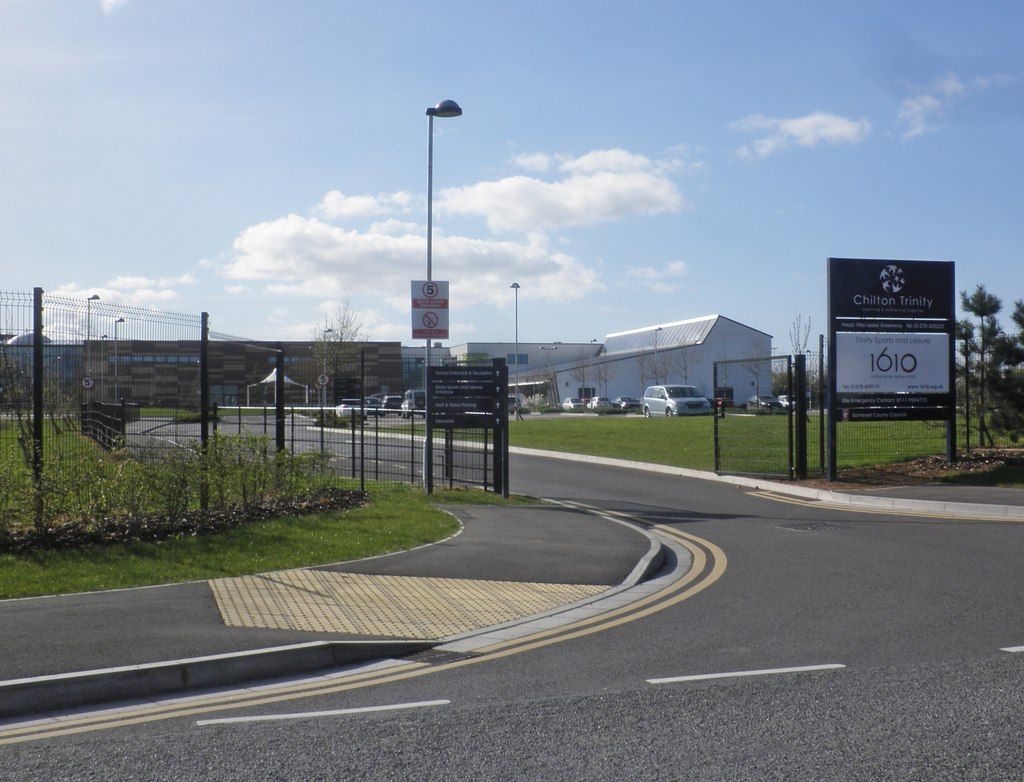

Location
- Chilton Street; Bridgwater, Somerset, TA6 3JA; England
- Coordinates: 51.1400°N 3.0072°W

Information
- Type: Academy
- Motto: Ambition, Engagement, Resilience
- Local authority: Somerset County Council
- Trust: Clevedon Learning Trust
- Department for Education URN: 145677 Tables
- Ofsted: Reports
- Headteacher: Kathryn Deady
- Gender: Coeducational
- Age: 11 to 16
- Enrolment: 995 as of 2025
- Houses: Jupiter, Mars, Neptune, and Venus
- Colours: Blue, red, yellow, and green
- Website: http://www.chilton-trinity.co.uk/

Chilton Trinity School is a coeducational secondary school located at Chilton Trinity, Bridgwater, Somerset, England.

Bridgwater was selected as the first town in the South West level to be selected for the UK governments Building Schools for the Future initiative, which aimed to rebuild and renew nearly every secondary school in England. Within Bridgwater, the initiative was to develop all of the four secondary schools, along with two special provision schools, Elmwood School and Penrose School, at an expected cost of around £100 million. This included the complete relocation and rebuilding of a new school combining the Haygrove and Penrose Schools. In July 2010, several components of the scheme for Bridgwater schools were cancelled and others were still under discussion.

Previously a foundation school administered by Somerset County Council, in September 2019 Chilton Trinity School converted to academy status. The school is now sponsored by the Clevedon Learning Trust.
