= Bridgwater College Academy =

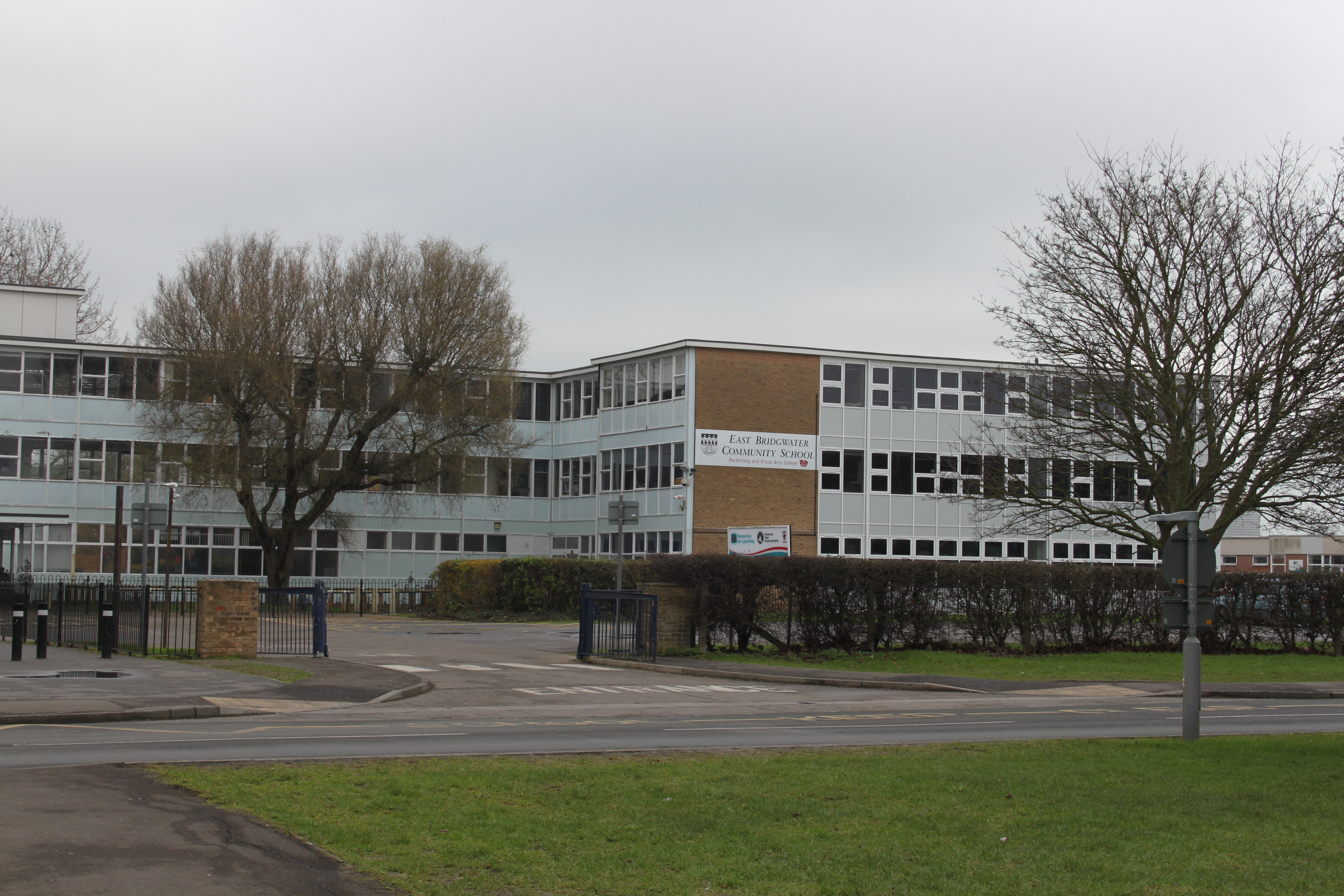

Location
- Parkway; Bridgwater, Somerset, TA6 4QY; England; 51.1322°N 2.9813°W

Information
- Type: All-through Academy
- Motto: Dream Believe Achieve
- Established: September 2012
- Local authority: Somerset County Council
- Department for Education URN: 138375 Tables
- Ofsted: Reports
- Executive Headteacher: Jonathan Black
- Head of Secondary Phase: Chris Wade
- Gender: Mixed
- Age: 3 to 16
- Enrolment: 1218
- Website: http://www.bridgwatercollegeacademy.org

Bridgwater College Academy is a mixed all-through Academy which combines both primary and secondary education for pupils aged 3 to 16. The academy, which is sponsored by Bridgwater College, is located in Bridgwater, Somerset, England. It was established in September 2012 following the merger of East Bridgwater Community School with Sedgemoor Manor Junior and Infants schools.

== History ==
The former school was a specialist Arts College, and has 800 students between the ages of 11 and 16.

Bridgwater was the first town in the South West level to be selected for the UK governments Building Schools for the Future initiative, which aimed to rebuild and renew nearly every secondary school in England. Within Bridgwater, Building Schools for the Future was to develop all of the 4 secondary schools along with 2 special provision schools, Elmwood School and Penrose School at an expected cost of around £100 Million. This included the complete relocation and rebuilding of a new school combining both the Haygrove and Penrose Schools. In July 2010 several components of the scheme for Bridgwater schools were cancelled and others were still under discussion.
