= Cannington Court =

Building in Cannington, Somerset, England

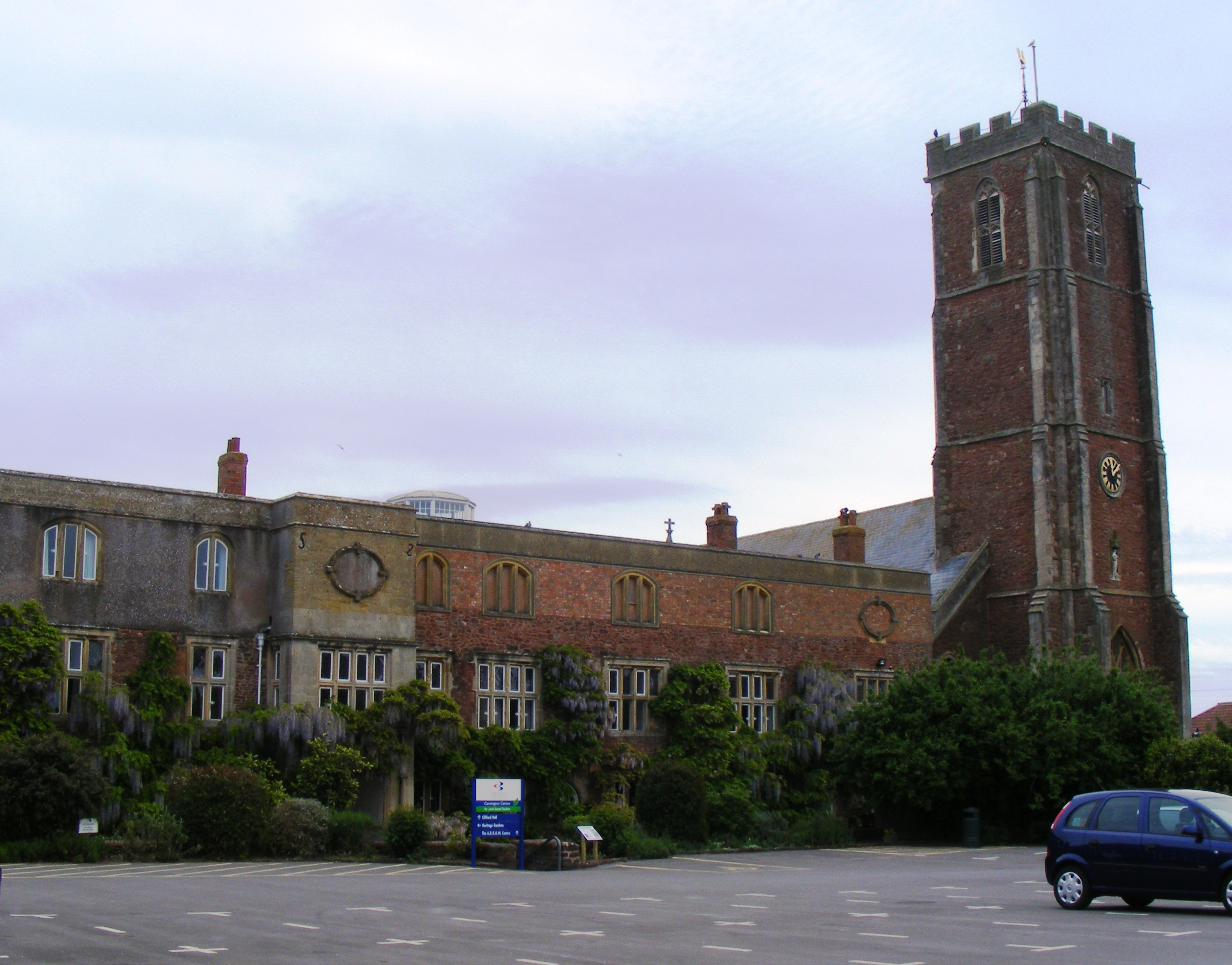

- Location within Somerset

General information
- Location: Cannington, Somerset, England
- Coordinates: 51.1506°N 3.0618°W
- Completed: c 1138
- Client: Robert de Courcy

Cannington Court in the village of Cannington, Somerset, England was built around 1138 as the lay wing of a Benedictine nunnery, founded by Robert de Courcy. It has been designated as a Grade I listed building.

== History ==
Cannington Priory, later to be known as Cannington Court, was first established by the De Courcy family in about 1138. Many of the gentry of Somerset sent their daughters to reside there. By the fourteenth century, there was some moral backsliding and in 1328, an inquiry was set up to investigate illicit activities of monks and nuns. Large iron-bound gates were erected to ensure the nuns stayed inside the grounds, and there existed rumours that tunnels connected the nunnery to the village.

The Cannington Nunnery built the adjacent Church of St Mary and survived until the Dissolution of the Monasteries in 1536. The nunnery owned significant land in the area.

Following the dissolution of the priory the building was bought by Edward Rogers and he made various alterations. These were continued by the Clifford family when they acquired it, particularly in the early 18th century. During the 19th and 20th centuries there has been some redesigning of the interior.

From 1807 to 1835, Cannington Court was used by a community of Benedictine nuns who had returned to England following the French Revolution. After the nuns had left, the house was used as a Roman Catholic industrial school for boys. This was removed to Bath in 1917 where it became the Prior Park Industrial School. The Court then became part of the Somerset Farm Institute which later became Cannington College, and this was merged with Bridgwater College in 2004. Since then, there has been significant investment in the site, and a project to revive the walled garden has been undertaken. This garden was officially opened by Prince Edward, Earl of Wessex in 2009.

Cannington Court is currently being leased to the energy firm EDF as a residential training centre. EDF have installed renewable energy sources such as ground source heat pumps and solar panels, to provide half of the building's power requirements.

== The house ==
Cannington Court is a Grade I listed building, having been so designated on 29 March 1963. It is built of red sandstone with some brick sections. There is a moulded cornice and ashlar parapet with a coping. Some of the roofs are hipped; some are slated and others have Roman tiles. The range of buildings consist of a medieval hall and other buildings surrounding an irregular quadrangle, with a chapel wing on the south side. The entrance building has three storeys. The central, three-storey porch is made of ashlar stone and has slender Ionic columns on pedestals on either side. The windows have stone mullions.

== See also ==
- List of Grade I listed buildings in Sedgemoor
