= Cannington, Somerset =

Village and civil parish in Somerset, England

Coordinates: 51.150°N 3.067°W

Cannington
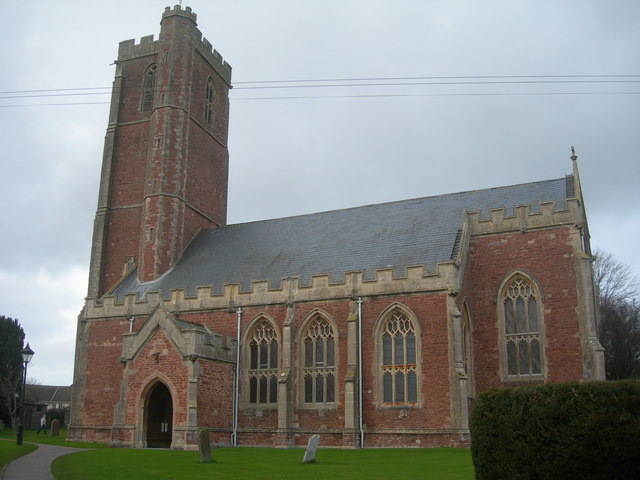
- Church of St Mary, Cannington

- Location within Somerset
- Population: 2,271 (2011)
- OS grid reference: ST255395
- Unitary authority: Somerset Council
- Ceremonial county: Somerset
- Region: South West
- Country: England
- Sovereign state: United Kingdom
- Post town: BRIDGWATER
- Postcode district: TA5
- Dialling code: 01278
- Police: Avon and Somerset
- Fire: Devon and Somerset
- Ambulance: South Western
- UK Parliament: Bridgwater

Cannington is a village and civil parish 3 miles (5 km) northwest of Bridgwater in Somerset, England. It lies on the west bank of the River Parret, and contains the hamlet of Edstock.

== History ==
The parish formerly included part of the village of Combwich, with its port and ferry terminal. In 1881 the parish contained 4,980 acres (2,020 ha).

The Saxon name of this village was Caninganmaersees or Cantuctone. Cantuc was an Old English word for a ridge, ton a settlement.

Cannington Camp, a Bronze Age and Iron Age hill fort, also called Cynwir or Cynwit Castle, has been suggested as the most likely location for it. The Cannington Camp site, of recognized archaeological importance, has been partly destroyed by Castle Hill Quarry in its limestone quarrying activities.

It is a possible site of the 878 Battle of Cynwit.

It was the site of Cannington Priory, a Benedictine nunnery founded by Robert de Courcy about 1140.

The lords of the manor were the Clifford family including Hugh Clifford, 2nd Baron Clifford of Chudleigh. Gurney Manor, a 13th-century manor house with an attached chapel wing, had been converted into flats but is now supported by the Landmark Trust and is available as holiday accommodation. A manor house was also built at Blackmore Farm, with its own chapel, around 1480 for Thomas Tremayll.

Cannington was the centre of its own hundred.

== Education ==
The Cannington Centre for Land-based Studies was formerly known as Cannington College, which was established in 1921, but now forms part of Bridgwater College. The village is also home to Brymore Academy.

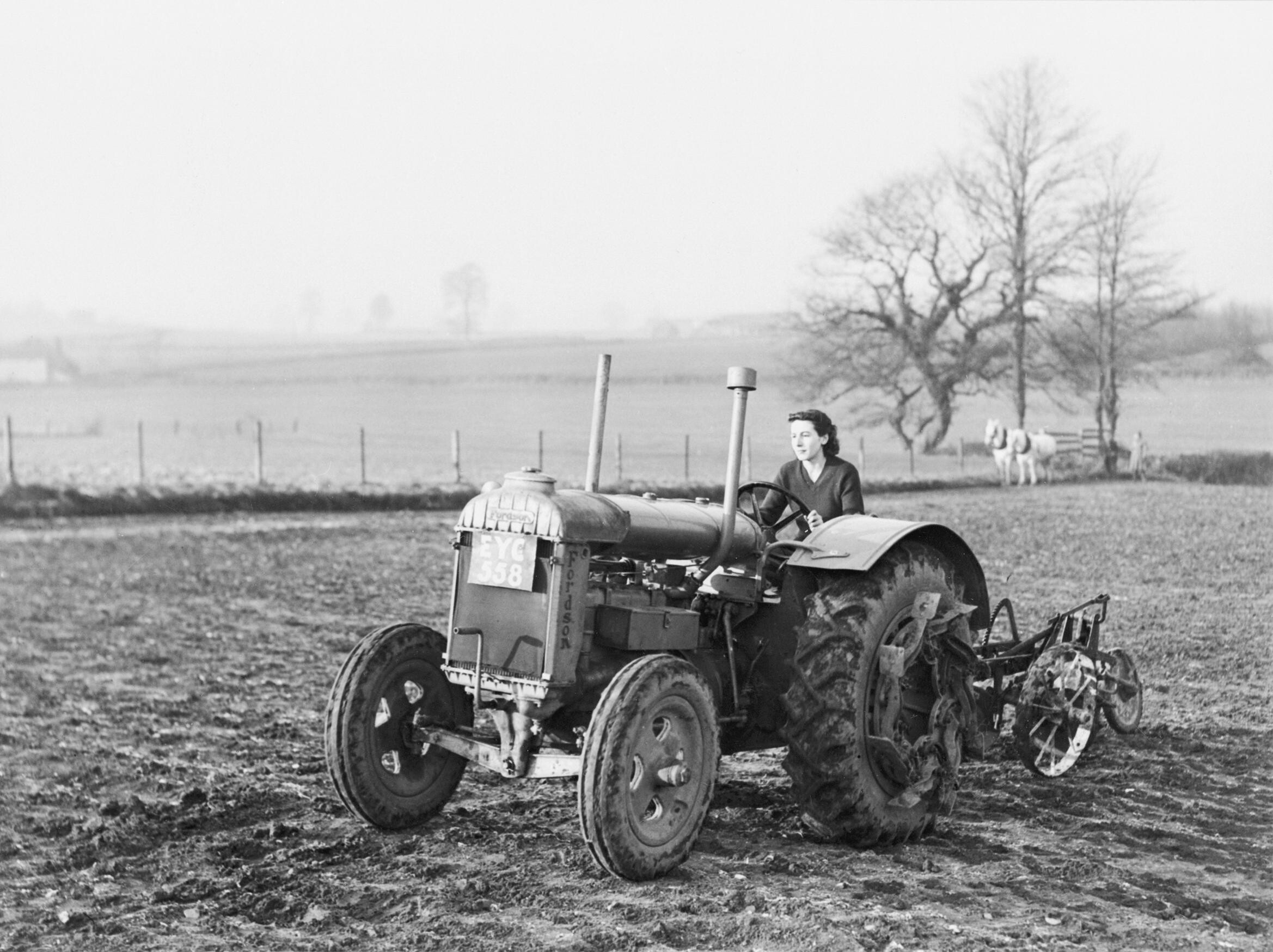
A Land Army girl using a Fordson tractor to plough a field at the agricultural college in Cannington during the Second World War

== Economy ==
The dairy to the west of Cannington, which has been operating since the 1930s, is now owned by local firm Yeo Valley Organic and produces yoghurt.

Castle Hill Quarry, a limestone quarry, is located at Cannington Park.

== Religious sites ==
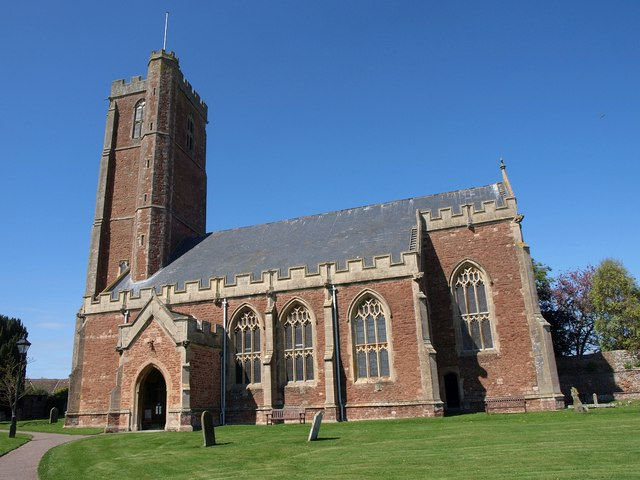
Church of St Mary, Cannington

The Church of St Mary has a tower, 120 feet/36.6m tall, which dates from the 14th century, the remainder was rebuilt in the early 15th century and restored in 1840 by Richard Carver. It has been designated by English Heritage as a Grade I listed building.

It was previously connected to Cannington Court and it may have been the site of Cannington Priory, a Benedictine nunnery founded by Robert de Courcy about 1140, which survived until the dissolution of the monasteries.

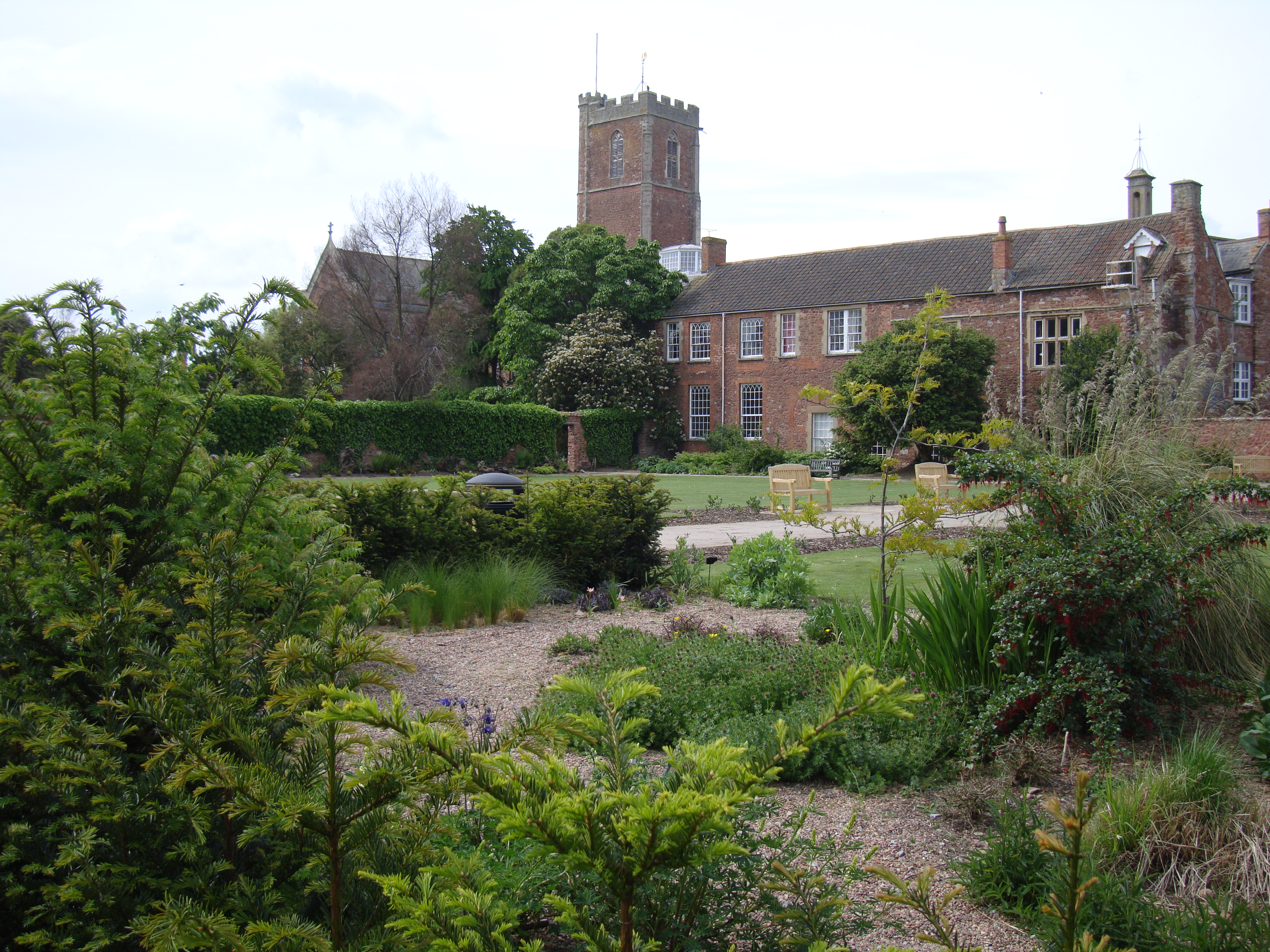
Cannington Court as seen from the Walled Gardens of Cannington

The nunnery owned significant land in the area. The site is now Cannington Court which incorporates some remains of the Priory. The priory grounds contain walled gardens which were opened in 2009 by Prince Edward, then Earl of Wessex, now Duke of Edinburgh, after a redevelopment. The gardens are used by Bridgwater College for their horticultural and "green economy" courses.

The present United Reformed Church chapel was built in 1869 as part of the Cannington Group of Congregational Churches, and is now a Joint Pastorate with Westfield United Reformed Church in Bridgwater.

== Governance ==
The parish council has responsibility for local issues, including setting an annual precept (local rate) to cover the council's operating costs and producing annual accounts for public scrutiny. The parish council evaluates local planning applications and works with the local police, district council officers, and neighbourhood watch groups on matters of crime, security, and traffic. The parish council's role also includes initiating projects for the maintenance and repair of parish facilities, as well as consulting with the district council on the maintenance, repair, and improvement of highways, drainage, footpaths, public transport, and street cleaning. Conservation matters (including trees and listed buildings) and environmental issues are also the responsibility of the council.

For local government purposes, since 1 April 2023, the village comes under the unitary authority of Somerset Council. Prior to this, it was part of the non-metropolitan district of Sedgemoor, which was formed on 1 April 1974 under the Local Government Act 1972, having previously been part of Bridgwater Rural District.

The village is part of Cannington and Wembdon electoral ward. Although Cannington is the most populous area the ward does include Wembdon. The total population of the ward at the 2011 census was 4,507.

It is also part of the Bridgwater county constituency represented in the House of Commons of the Parliament of the United Kingdom. It elects one Member of Parliament (MP) by the first past the post system of election, and was part of the South West England constituency of the European Parliament prior to Britain leaving the European Union in January 2020, which elected seven MEPs using the d'Hondt method of party-list proportional representation.

== Climate ==
Climate data for Cannington (1991–2020 normals, extremes 1959–2005)
Month	Jan	Feb	Mar	Apr	May	Jun	Jul	Aug	Sep	Oct	Nov	Dec	Year
Record high °C (°F)	15.4 (59.7)	17.7 (63.9)	20.6 (69.1)	26.1 (79.0)	27.0 (80.6)	32.5 (90.5)	34.0 (93.2)	32.5 (90.5)	28.9 (84.0)	25.6 (78.1)	19.0 (66.2)	15.7 (60.3)	34.0 (93.2)
Mean daily maximum °C (°F)	8.8 (47.8)	9.2 (48.6)	11.4 (52.5)	14.1 (57.4)	17.1 (62.8)	19.9 (67.8)	21.7 (71.1)	21.3 (70.3)	19.3 (66.7)	15.3 (59.5)	11.8 (53.2)	9.3 (48.7)	15.0 (59.0)
Daily mean °C (°F)	5.8 (42.4)	6.1 (43.0)	7.7 (45.9)	9.8 (49.6)	12.6 (54.7)	15.5 (59.9)	17.3 (63.1)	17.2 (63.0)	15.1 (59.2)	11.9 (53.4)	8.8 (47.8)	6.4 (43.5)	11.2 (52.1)
Mean daily minimum °C (°F)	2.8 (37.0)	2.9 (37.2)	4.0 (39.2)	5.4 (41.7)	8.1 (46.6)	11.1 (52.0)	12.9 (55.2)	13.0 (55.4)	10.8 (51.4)	8.4 (47.1)	5.7 (42.3)	3.4 (38.1)	7.4 (45.3)
Record low °C (°F)	−13.9 (7.0)	−9.4 (15.1)	−7.8 (18.0)	−2.8 (27.0)	−1.0 (30.2)	2.2 (36.0)	5.0 (41.0)	5.0 (41.0)	1.7 (35.1)	−2.7 (27.1)	−5.6 (21.9)	−8.3 (17.1)	−13.9 (7.0)
Average precipitation mm (inches)	77.6 (3.06)	54.6 (2.15)	55.7 (2.19)	53.0 (2.09)	51.2 (2.02)	52.0 (2.05)	53.2 (2.09)	70.3 (2.77)	62.1 (2.44)	87.7 (3.45)	85.9 (3.38)	83.7 (3.30)	787.0 (30.98)
Average precipitation days (≥ 1.0 mm)	13.1	10.5	10.4	9.6	9.4	8.6	8.9	10.5	9.1	13.0	13.5	13.1	129.5
Mean monthly sunshine hours	58.7	83.0	126.6	182.1	203.5	200.7	199.1	188.4	143.1	105.9	73.3	51.5	1,615.7
Source 1: Met Office
Source 2: Starlings Roost Weather
