= 2001 Dissolution Honours =

British government recognitions

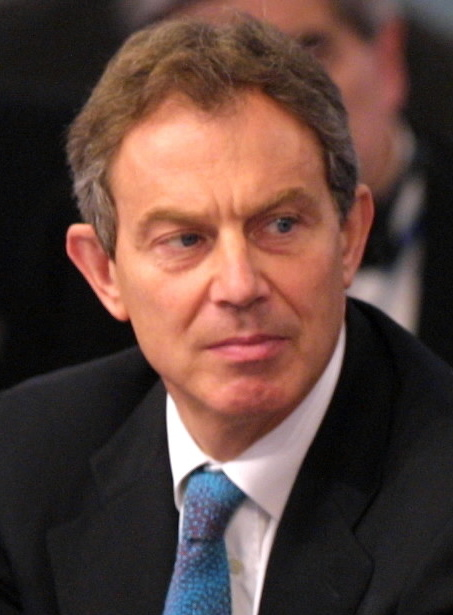
Prime Minister Tony Blair pictured in 2002

The 2001 Dissolution Honours List was gazetted on 2 June 2001 prior to the General Election of the same year by the Prime Minister, Tony Blair.

== Life peerages ==
=== Conservative ===
- Rt Hon. Peter Leonard Brooke CH as Baron Brooke of Sutton Mandeville, of Sutton Mandeville in the County of Wiltshire, Member of Parliament for the City of London and Westminster South, 1977–97 and for the Cities of London and Westminster, 1997–2001. Chairman, Conservative Party, 1987–89; Secretary of State for Northern Ireland, 1989–92; for National Heritage, 1992–94.
- Rt Hon. Sir Peter Norman Fowler as Baron Fowler, of Sutton Coldfield in the County of West Midlands, Member of Parliament for Sutton Coldfield, 1974–2001 and for Nottingham South, 1970–74. Secretary of State for Transport, 1981 (Minister of Transport, 1979–81), for Social Services, 1981–87, for Employment, 1987–90; Chairman, Conservative Party, 1992–94; Opposition spokesman on the environment, transport and the regions, 1997–98; on home affairs, 1998–99.
- Rt Hon. Michael Ray Dibdin Heseltine CH as Baron Heseltine, of Thenford in the County of Northamptonshire, Member of Parliament for Henley, 1974–2001 and for Tavistock, 1966–74. Secretary of State for the Environment, 1979–83 and 1990–92, for Defence, 1983–86; President of the Board of Trade and Secretary of State for Trade and Industry, 1992–95; First Secretary of State and Deputy Prime Minister, 1995–97.
- Rt Hon. Thomas Jeremy King CH as Baron King of Bridgwater, of Bridgwater in the County of Somerset, Member of Parliament for Bridgwater, 1970–2001. Secretary of State for the Environment, 1983; for Transport, 1983; for Employment, 1983–85; for Northern Ireland, 1985–89, for Defence, 1989–92.
- Rt Hon. John Roddick Russell MacGregor OBE as Baron MacGregor of Pulham Market, of Pulham Market in the County of Norfolk, Member of Parliament for South Norfolk, 1974–2001. Chief Secretary to the Treasury, 1985–87; Minister of Agriculture, Fisheries and Food, 1987–89; Secretary of State for Education and Science, 1989–90; Lord President of the Council and Leader of the House of Commons, 1990–92; Secretary of State for Transport, 1992–94.

=== Labour ===
- Dale Norman Campbell-Savours as Baron Campbell-Savours, of Allerdale in the County of Cumbria, Member of Parliament for Workington, 1979–2001. Opposition spokesman on Development and Co-operation, 1991–92 and opposition front bench spokesman on Food, Agriculture and Rural Affairs, 1992–94.
- Rt Hon. David George Clark as Baron Clark of Windermere, of Windermere in the County of Cumbria, Member of Parliament for South Shields, 1979–2001 and for Colne Valley, 1970–74. Opposition spokesman on agriculture and food, 1972–74, on Defence, 1980–81, on environment, 1981–87; food, agriculture and rural affairs, 1987–92; defence, disarmament and arms control, 1992–97; Chancellor, Duchy of Lancaster, 1997–98.
- Robin Corbett as Baron Corbett of Castle Vale, of Erdington in the County of West Midlands, Member of Parliament for Birmingham, Erdington, 1983–2001 and for Hemel Hempstead, 1974–79. Opposition spokesman on home affairs, 1987–92, on broadcasting, the media and national heritage, 1992–94, on disabled people's rights, 1994–95. Member, Select Committee on Home Affairs, 1997–2001 (Chairman, 1999–2001).
- Llinos Golding as Baroness Golding, of Newcastle-under-Lyne in the County of Staffordshire, Member of Parliament for Newcastle-under-Lyme, 1986–2001. Member of Opposition team on: social security, 1992–95; children and families, 1993–95; food, agriculture and rural affairs, 1995–97. Member, Select Committee on Culture, Media and Sport, 1997–2001.
- Bruce Joseph Grocott as Baron Grocott, of Telford in the County of Shropshire, Member of Parliament for Telford, 1997–2001, for The Wrekin, 1987–97 and for Lichfield and Tamworth, 1974–79; PPS to Minister for Local Government and Planning, 1975–76; to Minister of Agriculture, 1976–78; Deputy Shadow Leader, House of Commons, 1987–92; Opposition front bench spokesman on foreign affairs, 1992–93; PPS to Leader of the Opposition, 1994–97, to Prime Minister 1997–2001.
- Rt Hon. Stephen Barry Jones as Baron Jones, of Deeside in the County of Clwyd, Member of Parliament for Alyn and Deeside, 1983–2001 and for Flint East, 1970–83. Parliamentary Under-Secretary of State for Wales, 1974–79; Opposition spokesman on employment, 1980–83; Opposition spokesman on Wales, 1983–92.
- Rt Hon. Sir John Morris QC as Baron Morris of Aberavon, of Aberavon in the County of West Glamorgan and of Ceredigion in the County of Dyfed, Member of Parliament for Aberavon, 1959–2001. Secretary of State for Wales, 1974–79; opposition spokesman on legal affairs, 1979–81 and 1983–97; Attorney General, 1997–99.
- Rt Hon. Thomas Pendry as Baron Pendry, of Stalybridge in the County of Greater Manchester, Member of Parliament for Stalybridge and Hyde, 1970–2001. Parliamentary Under Secretary of State, Northern Ireland Office, 1978–79; Opposition spokesman on Northern Ireland, 1979–82; on regional affairs and devolution, 1982–92; on national heritage, 1992–97.
- Rt Hon. Giles Heneage Radice as Baron Radice, of Chester-le-Street in the County of Durham, Member of Parliament for Durham North, 1983–2001 and for Chester-le-Street, 1973–83. Opposition spokesman on foreign affairs, 1981, on employment, 1982–83, on education, 1983–87.
- Rt Hon. Jeffrey William Rooker as Baron Rooker, of Perry Bar in the County of West Midlands, Member of Parliament for Birmingham, Perry Bar, 1974–2001. Opposition spokesman on social security, 1980–83, on treasury and economic affairs, 1983–84, on housing, 1984–87, on local government, 1987–88, on health and social services, 1990–92, on higher education, 1992–93; Deputy Shadow Leader of House of Commons, 1994–97; Minister of State, MAFF, 1997–99; Department of Social Security, 1999–2001.
- Rt Hon. Robert Edward Sheldon as Baron Sheldon, of Ashton-under-Lyne in the County of Greater Manchester, Member of Parliament for Ashton-under-Lyne, 1964–2001. Minister of State, Civil Service Department, 1974; Minister of State, HM Treasury, 1974–75; Financial Secretary to the Treasury, 1975–79; Opposition spokesman on Treasury matters, 1981–83. Chairman, Standards and Privileges Committee, 1997–2001; Liaison Committee, 1997–2001.
- Peter Temple-Morris as Baron Temple-Morris, of Llandaff in the County of South Glamorgan and of Leominster in the County of Herefordshire, Member of Parliament for Leominster, 1974–2001. PPS to Minister of Transport, 1979. Member: Select Committee on Agriculture, 1982–83; on Foreign Affairs, 1987–90.

=== Liberal Democrat ===
- Rt Hon. Sir Jeremy John Durham Ashdown KBE as Baron Ashdown of Norton-sub-Hamdon, of Norton-sub-Hamdon in the County of Somerset, Member of Parliament for Yeovil, 1983–2001. Liberal spokesman for Trade and Industry, 1983–86; Alliance spokesman on education and science, 1987; Liberal Democrat spokesman on Northern Ireland, 1988–92; Leader, Social and Liberal Democrats, 1988–89, Liberal Democrats, 1988–99.
- Ronald Cyril Fearn OBE as Baron Fearn, of Southport in the County of Merseyside, Member of Parliament for Southport, 1987–92 and 1997–2001. Liberal Democrat spokesman for: health, tourism, housing, transport, 1989–92, national heritage, constitution and civil service (tourism), 1997–99; culture, media and sport (tourism), 1999–2001.
- Richard Arthur Lloyd Livsey CBE as Baron Livsey of Talgarth, of Talgarth in the County of Powys, Member of Parliament for Brecon and Radnorshire, 1997–2001 and for Brecon and Radnor, 1985–92. Liberal Party spokesman on agriculture, 1985–87; Alliance spokesman on the countryside and on agriculture in Wales, and on Wales, 1987; Leader Welsh Liberal Democrats and party spokesman on Wales, 1988–92 and 1997–2001.
- Janet Ray Michie as Baroness Michie of Gallanch, of Oban in Argyll and Bute, Member of Parliament for Argyll and Bute, 1987–2001. Chair, Scottish Liberal Democrats, 1992–93. Liberal spokeswoman for transport and rural development, 1987–88; Liberal Democrat spokeswoman for: women's issues, 1988–94; Scotland, 1988–2001.
- Rt Hon. Robert Adam Ross Maclennan as Baron Maclennan of Rogart, of Rogart in Sutherland, Member of Parliament for Caithness, Sutherland and Easter Ross, 1997–2001 and for Caithness and Sutherland, 1966–97. Leader, SDP, 1987–88; Liberal Democrat spokesman for: home affairs and the arts, 1988–94, on constitutional affairs and culture, 1994–2001.

=== Ulster Unionist ===
- Kenneth Wiggins Maginnis as Baron Maginnis of Drumglass, of Carnteel in the County of Tyrone, Member of Parliament for Fermanagh and South Tyrone, 1983–2001 (resigned seat in 1985 and re-elected in 1986). Spokesman for: defence and home office, 1997–2000; defence, trade and industry, 2000–2001.
- Rt Hon. Dr John David Taylor as Baron Kilclooney, of Armagh in the County of Armagh, Member of Parliament for Strangford, 1983–2001 (resigned seat in 1985 and re-elected in 1986). Spokesman for trade and industry, 1992–97; foreign and Commonwealth affairs, 1997–2001; Member of the United Kingdom delegation to the Council of Europe, 1997–2001.
