= Hywel Francis =

British politician (1946–2021)

- Francis as an MP

Chair of the Joint Committee on Human Rights
- In office 8 September 2010 – 30 March 2015
- Preceded by: Andrew Dismore
- Succeeded by: Harriet Harman

Chair of the Welsh Affairs Committee
- In office 13 July 2005 – 6 May 2010
- Preceded by: Martyn Jones
- Succeeded by: David T. C. Davies

Member of Parliament for Aberavon
- In office 7 June 2001 – 30 March 2015
- Preceded by: John Morris
- Succeeded by: Stephen Kinnock

Personal details
- Born: David Hywel Francis; 6 June 1946 Neath, Glamorgan, Wales
- Died: 14 February 2021 (aged 74) Morriston, Swansea, Wales
- Party: Labour
- Spouse: Mair Price (m. 1968)
- Children: 3
- Parent: Dai Francis (father)
- Education: Swansea University
- Profession: Historian; adult educator; politician
- Website: Official website

David Hywel Francis (6 June 1946 – 14 February 2021) was a British politician who served as Member of Parliament (MP) for Aberavon from 2001 to 2015. A member of the Labour Party, he chaired the Welsh Affairs Committee from 2005 to 2010 and the Joint Committee on Human Rights from 2010 to 2015.

== Background ==
Hywel Francis attended Whitchurch Grammar School and Llangatwg Secondary School. He studied at the University of Wales, Swansea, where he earned a doctorate in history. Francis continued to work at the University of Wales as a professor in Adult Continuing Education before being elected in 2001. At the University of Wales, he founded the South Wales Miners' Library. He also was the chair of the Wales Congress in Support of Mining Communities. Francis was a speaker of the Welsh language.

Francis was a member of the Gorsedd Cymru from 1986. He was made vice-president of Carers UK and honorary parliamentary patron of the adult learners' body, NIACE. He was a trustee of the Paul Robeson Wales Trust and the Bevan Foundation he founded. He was the South Wales Miners' Museum president. He authored many peer-reviewed articles, book chapters, and several books. His books include: The Fed (co-author, Dai Smith) in 1980 (reprinted in 1998); Miners Against Fascism in 1984; Wales: A Learning Country in 1999; History on Our Side in 2009; and Do Miners Read Dickens? (co-author, Siân Williams) in 2013. Francis is featured in the documentary film After Coal.

He was the son of Dai Francis, who led the South Wales NUM during the industrial unrest of the 1970s. Like his father, he had been a member of the Communist Party of Great Britain.

== Political career ==
In 1999, Francis became a special adviser to Paul Murphy, the Secretary of State for Wales; Murphy worked in this position until 2000. The following year, he was elected to the House of Commons. He was re-elected in May 2005. He was the chair of the Welsh Affairs Select Committee from 2005 to 2010; chair of the all-party parliamentary group (APPG) on Archives and History, formerly chair of the APPG on Steel and Cast Metal; and chair of the All-Party Carers Group.

Francis voted in favour of a bill that banned smoking in restaurants in April 2003. In December 2004 and October 2005, he voted in favour of the Identity Cards Bill. In March 2002, he voted to ban the hunting of wild mammals with dogs. He voted in favour of the NHS foundation trust proposal. He also voted in favour of allowing unmarried heterosexual and homosexual couples to adopt, and in favour of the Civil Partnership Bill. Francis voted in favour of the replacement of the Trident system.

He voted in favour of adding clauses to a bill that allow the Secretary of State to detain indefinitely, pending deportation, anyone he or she suspects is a terrorist, even if the law forbids that person's deportation from ever taking place. He voted against only allowing people detained at a police station to be fingerprinted and searched for an identifying birthmark if it is in connection with a terrorism investigation. He voted against changing the text in the Prevention of Terrorism Bill from "The Secretary of State may make a control order against an individual" to "The Secretary of State may apply to the court for a control order [...]".

In March 2003, he voted that the case had not yet been made for war against Iraq. In June 2003, he voted against a motion that would have recalled the Prime Minister's assertion that Iraq had weapons of mass destruction that could be used at 45 minutes' notice, and against launching an independent inquiry into the intelligence received and the decisions that were based on it. In June 2007, he voted against a motion calling for an independent inquiry by a committee of privy counsellors into the Iraq War.

Francis fought against the closing of Port Talbot Magistrates' Court and the moving of administrative posts to other locations, saying, "Local justice needs to take place in a local setting." He suggested that Wales could have a carers' commissioner based on the Children's Commissioner for Wales.

In February 2011, it was reported that Francis had been quoted in a leaked US diplomatic cable. The cable by a US embassy political officer dated from 2008 and discussed the upcoming Welsh Labour leadership election to choose a successor to the retiring Rhodri Morgan. Francis was quoted as claiming that all of the prospective candidates who were already members of the Welsh Assembly were seen as flawed by the Welsh Labour Party and suggesting that many in the party were hoping for a "white knight" to be "parachute[d] in" from outside the Assembly. However, Francis claimed that he could not recall the conversation, suggesting that "it sounds as if the diplomat suffers from poor shorthand" and stating that "it is on the record that I was an early supporter of [Assembly Member and successful leadership candidate] Carwyn Jones [...] I would certainly not have supported such an absurd suggestion as parachuting anyone into the assembly".

On 22 November 2013, Francis announced he would be standing down as MP for Aberavon at the 2015 general election. Stephen Kinnock, son of former Labour leader Neil Kinnock, was selected to succeed Francis as the Labour candidate for Aberavon.

== Personal life ==
Francis married Mair Price in 1968. They had a son with Down syndrome, who died aged 16 in 1997 of a heart condition.

He died aged 74 from cancer on 14 February 2021, at Morriston Hospital in Swansea, Wales. Francis is survived by his wife and two children.

== Publications ==
- Francis, Hywel & Smith, Dai (1980). The Fed, a History of the South Wales Miners in the Twentieth Century (reprint ed.). Lawrence and Wishart. ISBN 978-0-85315-524-9.
- — (1984). Miners Against Fascism: Wales and the Spanish Civil War. Lawrence and Wishart. ISBN 978-0-85315-576-8.
- — (1999). Cymru: Gwlad Sy'n Dysgu; Llawlyfr Addysg Am Oes 1999 [Wales: a Learning Country; the 1999 Handbook for Lifelong Learning] (in Welsh). Abertawe: Prifysgol Cymru Abertawe, Canolfan Addysg am Oes Cymru. ISBN 978-1-900346-45-0.
- — (2009). History on Our Side: Wales and the 1984–85 Miners' Strike (illustrated, reprint ed.). Iconau. ISBN 978-1-905762-45-3.
- — & Williams, Siân (2013). Do Miners Read Dickens?: Origins and Progress of the South Wales Miners' Library, 1973–2013 (illustrated ed.). Parthian. ISBN 978-1-909844-44-5.

Parliament of the United Kingdom
| Preceded by John Morris | Member of Parliament for Aberavon; 2001–2015 | Succeeded by Stephen Kinnock |
