= John Morris, Baron Morris of Aberavon =

British politician (1931–2023)

The Right Honourable The Lord Morris of Aberavon KG PC KC
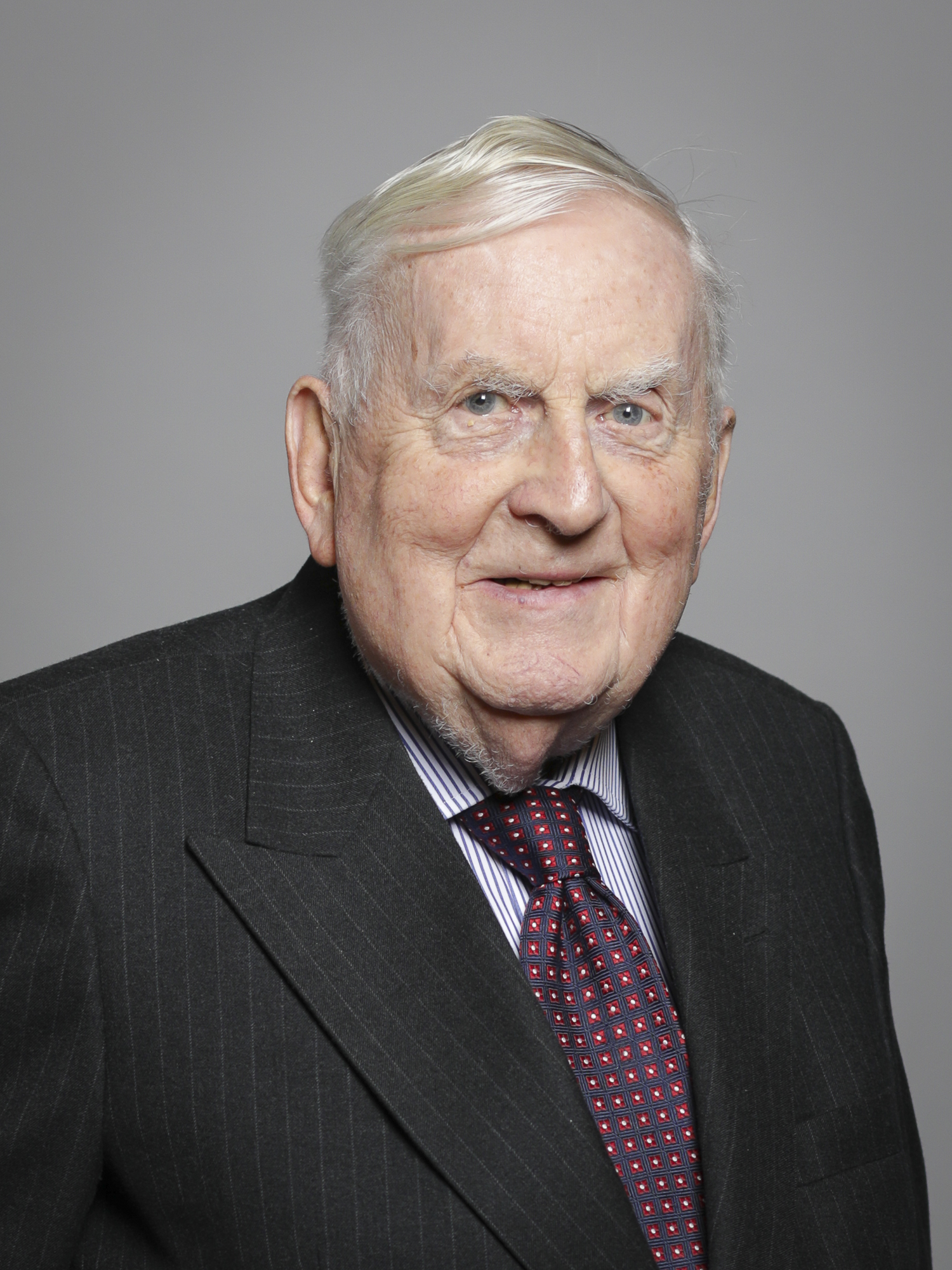
- Official portrait, 2019

Attorney General for England and Wales; Attorney General for Northern Ireland
- In office 2 May 1997 – 29 July 1999
- Prime Minister: Tony Blair
- Solicitor General: The Lord Falconer of Thoroton; Ross Cranston
- Preceded by: Sir Nicholas Lyell
- Succeeded by: The Lord Williams of Mostyn
Opposition frontbench 1979‍–‍1997
Shadow Attorney General
In office 9 June 1983 – 2 May 1997
Leader	Michael Foot; Neil Kinnock; John Smith; Margaret Beckett (acting); Tony Blair
Preceded by	Arthur Davidson
Succeeded by	Sir Nicholas Lyell
In office 14 July 1979 – 24 November 1981
Leader	James Callaghan; Michael Foot
Preceded by	Samuel Silkin
Succeeded by	Peter Archer
Shadow Secretary of State for Wales
In office 4 May 1979 – 14 July 1979
Leader	James Callaghan
Preceded by	Nicholas Edwards
Succeeded by	Alec Jones
Ministerial offices 1966‍–‍1979
Secretary of State for Wales
In office 5 March 1974 – 4 May 1979
Prime Minister	Harold Wilson; James Callaghan
Preceded by	Peter Thomas
Succeeded by	Nicholas Edwards
Minister of Defence for Equipment
In office 16 April 1968 – 19 June 1970
Prime Minister	Harold Wilson
Preceded by	Roy Mason
Succeeded by	Robert Lindsay
Parliamentary Secretary to the Minister of Transport
In office 10 January 1966 – 16 April 1968
Prime Minister	Harold Wilson
Preceded by	George Lindgren
Succeeded by	Robert Brown

Member of the House of Lords
- Lord Temporal
- Life peerage 3 July 2001 – 5 June 2023

Member of Parliament for Aberavon
- In office 8 October 1959 – 14 May 2001
- Preceded by: William Cove
- Succeeded by: Hywel Francis

Personal details
- Born: John Morris; 5 November 1931 Capel Bangor, Wales
- Died: 5 June 2023 (aged 91)
- Party: Labour
- Spouse: Margaret Lewis (m. 1959)
- Children: Three
- Education: Aberystwyth University; Gonville and Caius College, Cambridge

John Morris, Baron Morris of Aberavon (5 November 1931 – 5 June 2023) was a Welsh politician. He was a Labour Party Member of Parliament for over 41 years, from 1959 to 2001, which included a period as Secretary of State for Wales from 1974 to 1979 and as Attorney General between 1997 and 1999. A native Welsh speaker, he was the last living former Labour MP who was first elected in the 1950s. He was also the last surviving member of Harold Wilson's 1974–76 cabinet, and was the longest-serving Privy Counsellor at the time of his death. His combined parliamentary service totalled over 60 years.

== Background and education ==
Morris was born in Capel Bangor, Aberystwyth, Cardiganshire, on 5 November 1931. He was educated at the Ardwyn School, the University College of Wales, Aberystwyth, and Gonville and Caius College, Cambridge. During the course of his national service, he was stationed with the Royal Welch Fusiliers, the Welch Regiment, and the South Wales Borderers.

In 1959, Morris married Margaret Lewis, and they had three daughters.

== Legal career ==
Morris was a barrister and was called to the Bar by Gray's Inn in 1954. He served as a legal adviser and deputy general secretary for the Farmers' Union of Wales. He practised at 2 Bedford Row Chambers, took silk in 1973, and was made a Bencher of Gray's Inn in 1985. Between 1982 and 1997, he was a Recorder of the Crown Court.

== Political career ==
Morris represented Aberavon as its Labour MP from 1959 onwards, and subsequently became the longest serving Welsh MP in Parliament, until his retirement in 2001. According to The Almanac of British Politics, Morris was a "moderate" Labour MP.

Morris served as Parliamentary Under-Secretary of State at the Ministry of Power and the Ministry of Transport, and Minister of State at the Ministry of Defence. Having been sworn of the Privy Council in the 1970 Birthday Honours, Morris joined the Cabinet as Secretary of State for Wales between 5 March 1974 and 4 May 1979 and returned to Government as the Attorney General for England and Wales and Northern Ireland between 1997 and 1999, having shadowed the role since 1983. As such, he was one of only a small handful of Labour ministers to hold office under Harold Wilson, James Callaghan and Tony Blair.

== Other positions held ==
Morris was the Chancellor of the University of South Wales from the time of its formation in 2013. The University of South Wales was formed by a merger between University of Glamorgan (where Lord Morris was Chancellor from 2002) and the University of Wales, Newport. He succeeded fellow Labour politician Lord Merlyn-Rees as the Chancellor for the University of Glamorgan. Lord Morris was President of the London Welsh Trust, which runs the London Welsh Centre, Gray's Inn Road, from 2001 until 2008. He was also a council member of The Prince's Trust.

== Later life and death ==
His memoir, Fifty Years in Politics and the Law, was published in 2011.

At the death of the 29th Earl of Crawford on 18 March 2023, Morris and Stratton Mills became the surviving former MPs with the earliest date of first election, both having first entered Parliament at the 1959 general election.

Lord Morris of Aberavon died on 5 June 2023, at the age of 91.

== Honours ==
Morris was raised to the peerage for life as Baron Morris of Aberavon, of Aberavon in the County of West Glamorgan and of Ceredigion in the County of Dyfed, in the 2001 Dissolution Honours, was made Lord Lieutenant of Dyfed a year later and was appointed to the Order of the Garter as a Knight Companion (KG) in 2003.

=== Arms ===
Coat of arms of John Morris, Baron Morris of Aberavon
Notes Life peer as Baron since 2001 Coronet A coronet of a Baron Crest A bull passant Sable armed and unguled Or with a palewise book Argent upon other Sable. Torse Mantling Argent and Sable. Escutcheon Sable a Portcullis Or, over all three swords palewise proper headed Or. Motto BID BEN BID BONT; Welsh: He who would a leader be, be a bridge Orders The Order of the Garter circlet. Banner The banner of the Baron Morris of Aberavon's arms used as Knight Companion of the Garter depicted at St George's Chapel.

Parliament of the United Kingdom
Preceded by William Cove	Member of Parliament for Aberavon; 1959–2001	Succeeded by Hywel Francis
Political offices
Preceded by Peter Thomas	Secretary of State for Wales; 1974–1979	Succeeded by Nicholas Edwards
Preceded by Michael Havers	Shadow Attorney General; 1980–1981	Succeeded by Peter Archer
Preceded by Arthur Davidson	Shadow Attorney General; 1982–1997	Succeeded by Nicholas Lyell
Preceded by Nicholas Lyell	Attorney General for England and Wales; 1997–1999	Succeeded by The Lord Williams of Mostyn
Preceded by Nicholas Lyell	Attorney General for Northern Ireland; 1997–1999	Succeeded by The Lord Williams of Mostyn
Honorary titles
Preceded by David Lewis	Lord Lieutenant of Dyfed; 2002–2006	Succeeded by Robin Lewis
Preceded by The Duke of Edinburgh	Senior Privy Counsellor; 2021–2023	Succeeded by The Lord Hattersley
Academic offices
Preceded by Merlyn Rees	Chancellor of the University of Glamorgan; 2002–2023	Vacant
