= Teachers Labour League =

1922 UK political organisation

The Teachers' Labour League was a political organisation of teachers formed in the United Kingdom in 1922. By 1924 it had around 800 members organised in 27 branches. Originally affiliated to the Labour Party, it was later expelled in 1926.

== Prominent members ==
- William Cove
- R. H. Tawney
- Sidney Webb
- H. G. Wells
