= Paddy Ashdown =

British politician (1941–2018)

The Right Honourable The Lord Ashdown of Norton-sub-Hamdon GCMG CH KBE PC
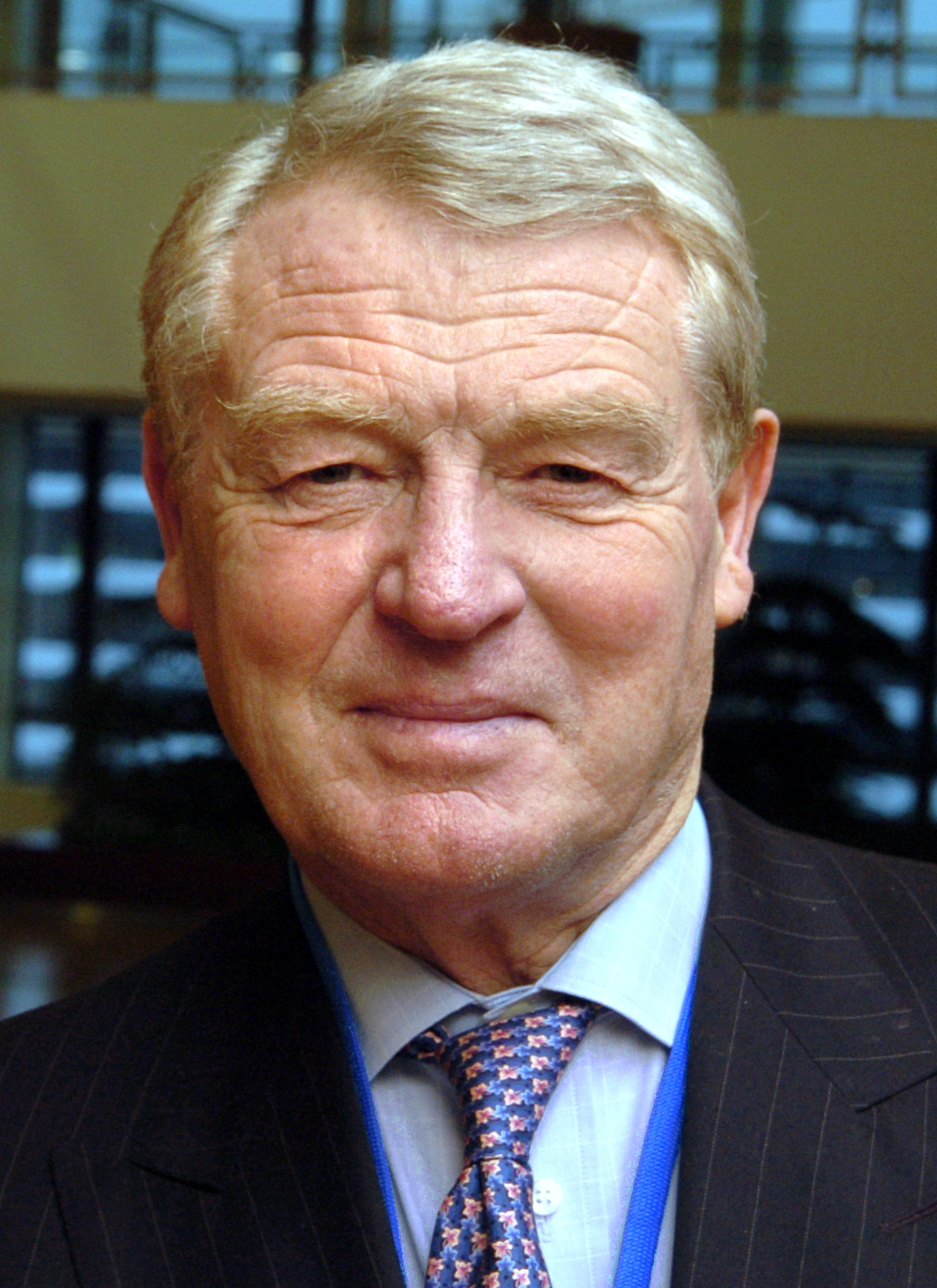
- Formal portrait, 2005

Leader of the Liberal Democrats
- In office 16 July 1988 – 9 August 1999
- President: Ian Wrigglesworth; Charles Kennedy; Robert Maclennan; The Baroness Maddock
- Deputy: Russell Johnston; Alan Beith
- Preceded by: David Steel (Liberal); Robert Maclennan (SDP)
- Succeeded by: Charles Kennedy

High Representative for Bosnia and Herzegovina
- In office 27 May 2002 – 31 January 2006
- Preceded by: Wolfgang Petritsch
- Succeeded by: Christian Schwarz-Schilling

European Union Special Representative for Bosnia and Herzegovina
- In office 3 June 2002 – 31 January 2006
- Preceded by: Office established
- Succeeded by: Christian Schwarz-Schilling
Parliamentary offices
Member of the House of Lords
Lord Temporal
Life peerage 10 July 2001 – 22 December 2018
Member of Parliament for Yeovil
In office 9 June 1983 – 14 May 2001
Preceded by	John Peyton
Succeeded by	David Laws

Personal details
- Born: Jeremy John Durham Ashdown; 27 February 1941 New Delhi, British India
- Died: 22 December 2018 (aged 77) Bristol, England
- Resting place: Church of St Mary the Virgin, Norton-sub-Hamdon
- Party: Liberal Democrats
- Other political affiliations: Labour (before 1975); Liberal (1975–1988)
- Spouse: Jane Courtenay (m. 1962)
- Children: 2
- Occupation: Diplomat; politician
- Nickname: Paddy

Military service
- Branch/service: Royal Marines
- Years of service: 1959–1972
- Rank: Captain
- Unit: Special Boat Service
- Battles/wars: Borneo confrontation; Operation Banner

Jeremy John Durham Ashdown, Baron Ashdown of Norton-sub-Hamdon (27 February 1941 – 22 December 2018), better known as Paddy Ashdown, was a British politician and diplomat who served as Leader of the Liberal Democrats from 1988 to 1999. Internationally, he is recognised for his role as High Representative for Bosnia and Herzegovina from 2002 to 2006, following his vigorous lobbying for military action against Yugoslavia in the 1990s.

Ashdown had an interpretership qualification in Mandarin and was fluent in several other languages, including Malay, German, French and Bosnian. After serving as a Royal Marine and Special Boat Service officer and as an intelligence officer in the UK security services, Ashdown was elected Member of Parliament (MP) for Yeovil in 1983 and was re-elected three times before retiring in 2001.

Ashdown was appointed Knight Grand Cross of the Order of St Michael and St George (GCMG) in the 2006 New Year Honours and Member of the Order of the Companions of Honour (CH) in the 2015 New Year Honours. In 2017, Ashdown was appointed Officer of the Legion of Honour by the French government.

== Early life and career ==
Ashdown was the eldest of seven children: four brothers and two sisters. He was born in New Delhi, British India, on 27 February 1941 to a family of soldiers and colonial administrators who spent their lives in India. His father was a lapsed Catholic, and his mother a Protestant. His mother (née Hudson) was a nurse in the Queen Alexandra's Royal Army Nursing Corps. Ashdown's father, John William Richard Durham Ashdown (1909–1980), was a British Indian Army officer who served in the 14th Punjab Regiment and the Royal Indian Army Service Corps, and in 1944 attained the rank of temporary lieutenant colonel. (Note: During the 1940 Dunkirk retreat, John Ashdown ignored an order to abandon the men of the 32nd Animal Transport Company (Mule) under his command, instead leading them to the port and on to one of the last ships to leave, without losing a single man. Although court-martialled for disobeying orders, he was exonerated and rose to the rank of colonel by the war's end.)

Ashdown was primarily brought up in Northern Ireland, where his father bought a farm in 1945 near Comber, County Down. He was educated first at a local primary school, then as a weekly boarder at Garth House Preparatory School in Bangor. Finally, from the age of 11, he was educated at Bedford School, an all-boys public school (i.e. independent boarding school) in England, where his accent earned him the nickname "Paddy".

=== Royal Marines and Special Boat Section ===
After his father's business collapsed, Ashdown passed the naval scholarship examination to pay for his school fees, but left before taking A-levels and joined the Royal Marines in 1959. He served until 1972 and retired with the rank of captain. He served in Borneo during the Indonesia–Malaysia confrontation and the Persian Gulf, before training as a Swimmer Canoeist in 1965, after which he joined the elite Special Boat Section (now named the Special Boat Service) and commanded a Section in the Far East. He then went to Hong Kong in 1967 to undertake a full-time interpreter's course in Chinese, and returned to the UK in 1970 when he was given command of a Royal Marine company in Belfast.

=== Intelligence officer and diplomat ===
Ashdown left the Royal Marines to join the Secret Intelligence Service (SIS or MI6). As diplomatic cover, he worked for the Foreign and Commonwealth Office as first secretary to the United Kingdom mission to the United Nations in Geneva, Switzerland. At the UN, Ashdown was responsible for relations with several UN organisations, involved in the negotiation of several international treaties, and some aspects of the Helsinki Accords in 1975.

== Political career ==
While in the Marines, Ashdown had been a supporter of the Labour Party but switched support to the Liberal Party in 1975. He had a comfortable life in Switzerland, where he lived with his wife Jane and their two children, Simon and Katherine, in a large house on the shores of Lake Geneva, enjoying plenty of time for sailing, skiing and climbing. Ashdown decided to enter politics after the UK had two general elections in one year (those of February and October 1974) and the Three-Day Week. He said that, "most of my friends thought it was utterly bonkers" to leave the diplomatic service, but that he had "a sense of purpose".

In 1976 Ashdown was selected as the Liberal Party's prospective parliamentary candidate in his wife's home constituency of Yeovil in Somerset, and took a job with Normalair Garrett, then part of the Yeovil-based Westland Group. Yeovil's Liberal candidate had been placed second in the February 1974 and third in the October 1974 general elections; Ashdown's objective was to "squeeze" the local Labour vote to enable him to defeat the Conservatives, who had held the seat since its creation in 1918. He subsequently worked for Tescan, and was unemployed for a time after that firm's closure in 1981, before becoming a youth worker with Dorset County Council's Youth Service, working on initiatives to help the young unemployed. That position being an unpaid "volunteer" one, Ashdown was at the time classified as "long-term unemployed", having applied unsuccessfully for 150 jobs.

=== Member of Parliament ===
At the 1979 general election, which returned the Conservatives to power, Ashdown regained second place, establishing a clear lead of 9% over the Labour candidate. The Conservative majority of 11,382 was still large enough to be regarded as a safe seat when the sitting MP John Peyton stood down at the 1983 general election to be made a life peer. Ashdown had gained momentum after his years of local campaigning. The Labour vote fell to only 5.5% and Ashdown won the seat with a majority of over 3,000, a swing from the Conservatives of 11.9% against a national swing of 4% to the Conservatives.

==== In Parliament ====
Ashdown had long been on his party's social democratic wing, supporting the 1977 Lib–Lab pact, and the SDP–Liberal Alliance. In the early 1980s, he was a prominent campaigner against the deployment in Europe of American nuclear-armed cruise missiles, describing them at a Campaign for Nuclear Disarmament rally in Hyde Park in 1983 as "the front end of the whole anti-nuclear struggle. It is the weapon we have to stop."

Shortly after entering the House of Commons, he was appointed SDP–Liberal Alliance spokesman on trade and industry and then on education. He opposed the privatisation of the Royal Ordnance Factories in 1984, criticised the Thatcher government in 1986 for allowing the United States to bomb Libya from UK bases, and campaigned against the loss of trade union rights by workers at GCHQ in 1987.

==== Leader of Liberal Democrats ====
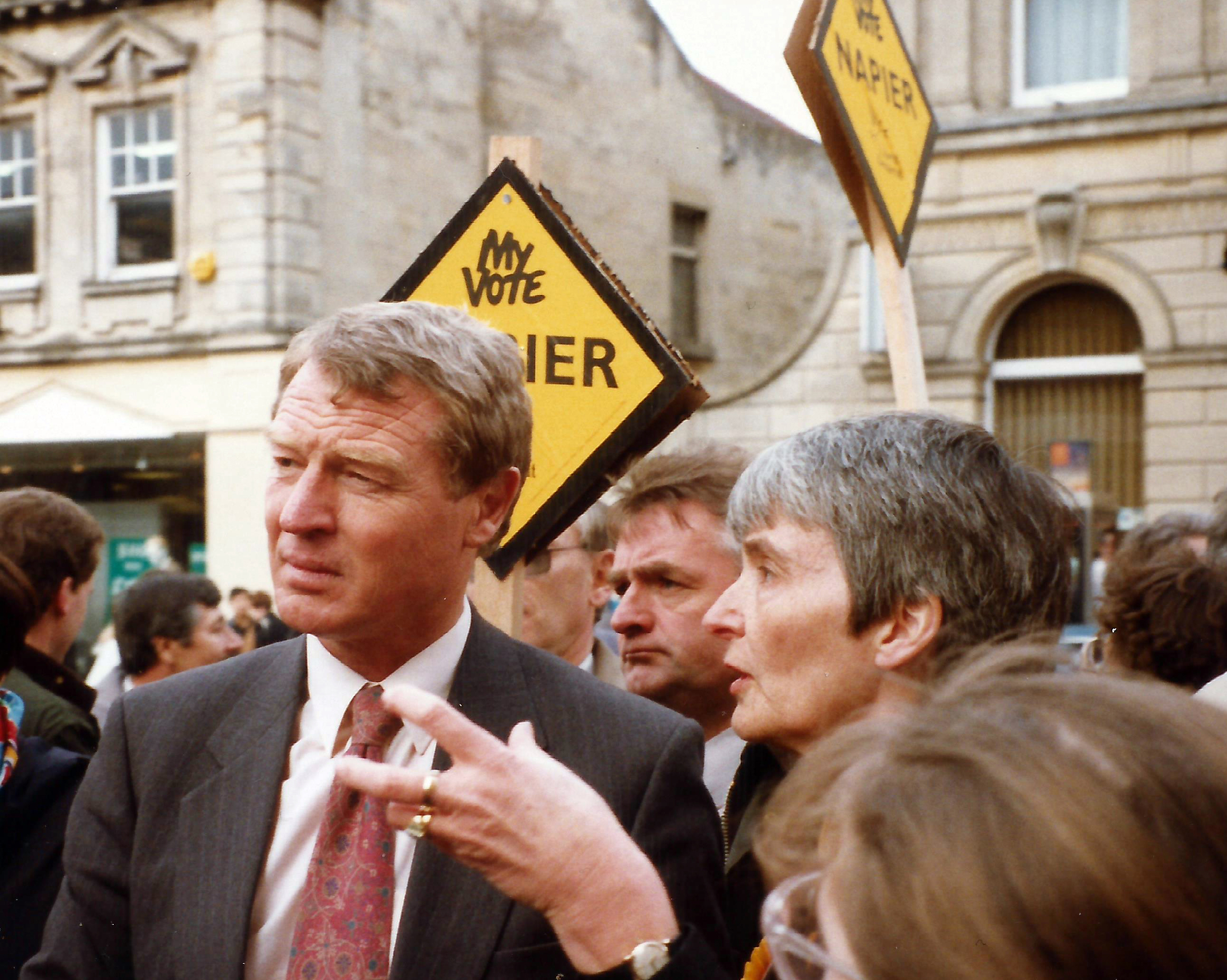
Ashdown in Chippenham during the 1992 general election campaign

When the Liberal Party merged in 1988 with the Social Democrats to form the Social and Liberal Democrats (their name shortened in 1989 to "Liberal Democrats"), he was elected as the new party's leader and made a Privy Councillor in January 1989.

Ashdown led the Liberal Democrats into two general elections, in 1992 and 1997, and three European Parliament elections, in 1989, 1994 and 1999. The Lib Dems failed to win any seats in the 1989 European Parliament election. They recorded a net loss of two seats in the 1992 general election when the party was still recovering from the after-effects of the 1988 merger. In 1994, the party gained its first two Members of the European Parliament. At the 1997 election, the Liberal Democrats won 46 seats, their best performance since the Liberal Party in the 1920s. However, they took a smaller share of the vote than in the 1992 election. While the Liberal Democrats vote share decreased in the 1999 European Parliament election, the move from first-past-the-post to the D'Hondt method saw the party make a net gain of 8 seats.

Between 1993 and 1997, he was a notable proponent of cooperation between the Liberal Democrats and "New Labour" and had regular secret meetings with Tony Blair to discuss the possibility of a coalition government. This was despite Labour's opinion poll showings from late 1992 onwards, virtually all suggesting that they would gain a majority at the next election, particularly in the first year or so of Blair's leadership following his appointment in mid-1994. The discussions began in early 1993, while the party was still being led by Blair's predecessor John Smith, who died suddenly in May 1994. After Blair was elected as Labour leader, the talks continued.

There was no need for a coalition, as the 1997 general election ended in a Labour landslide victory. The election also saw a breakthrough for the Liberal Democrats despite receiving fewer votes than in 1992; they increased their representation from 18 to 46. A "Joint Cabinet Committee" (JCC), including senior Labour and Liberal Democrat politicians, was then created to discuss the implementation of the two parties' shared priorities for constitutional reform; its remit was later expanded to include other issues on which Blair and Ashdown saw scope for cooperation between the two parties. Ashdown's successor as Liberal Democrat leader, Charles Kennedy, deliberately allowed the JCC to slip into abeyance until it effectively stopped meeting.

=== Resignation and peerage ===
Ashdown announced his intention to resign as Leader of the Liberal Democrats on 20 January 1999, departing on 9 August that year following 11 years in the role, and was succeeded by Charles Kennedy. In mid-1999, there was speculation that he would be appointed the new Secretary General of NATO; his lack of governmental experience meant that doubts were raised about his suitability. The post was ultimately filled by defence secretary George Robertson.

He was appointed a Knight Commander of the Order of the British Empire (KBE) in 2000 and after retiring from the Commons one month previously, he was created a life peer, the peerage being gazetted on 16 July 2001 as that of Baron Ashdown of Norton-sub-Hamdon, of Norton-sub-Hamdon in the County of Somerset. In the 2001 election, the Yeovil seat was retained for the Liberal Democrats by David Laws. Likewise, in 2001, the University of Bath conferred on Ashdown an honorary Doctor of Laws degree.

He was the subject of This Is Your Life in 2001, when he was surprised by Michael Aspel at BBC Television Centre.

== High Representative for Bosnia and Herzegovina ==
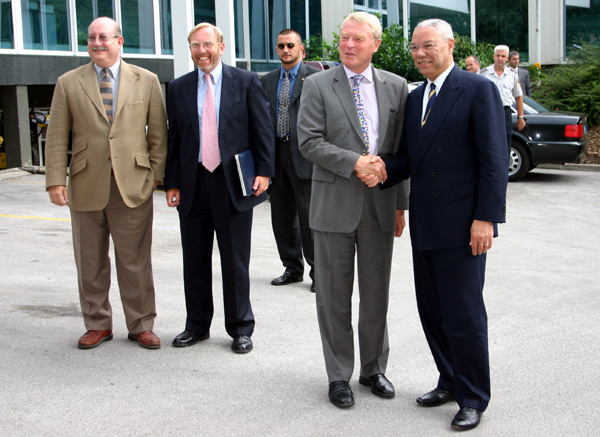
Ashdown (second from right) with US secretary of state Colin Powell in 2004

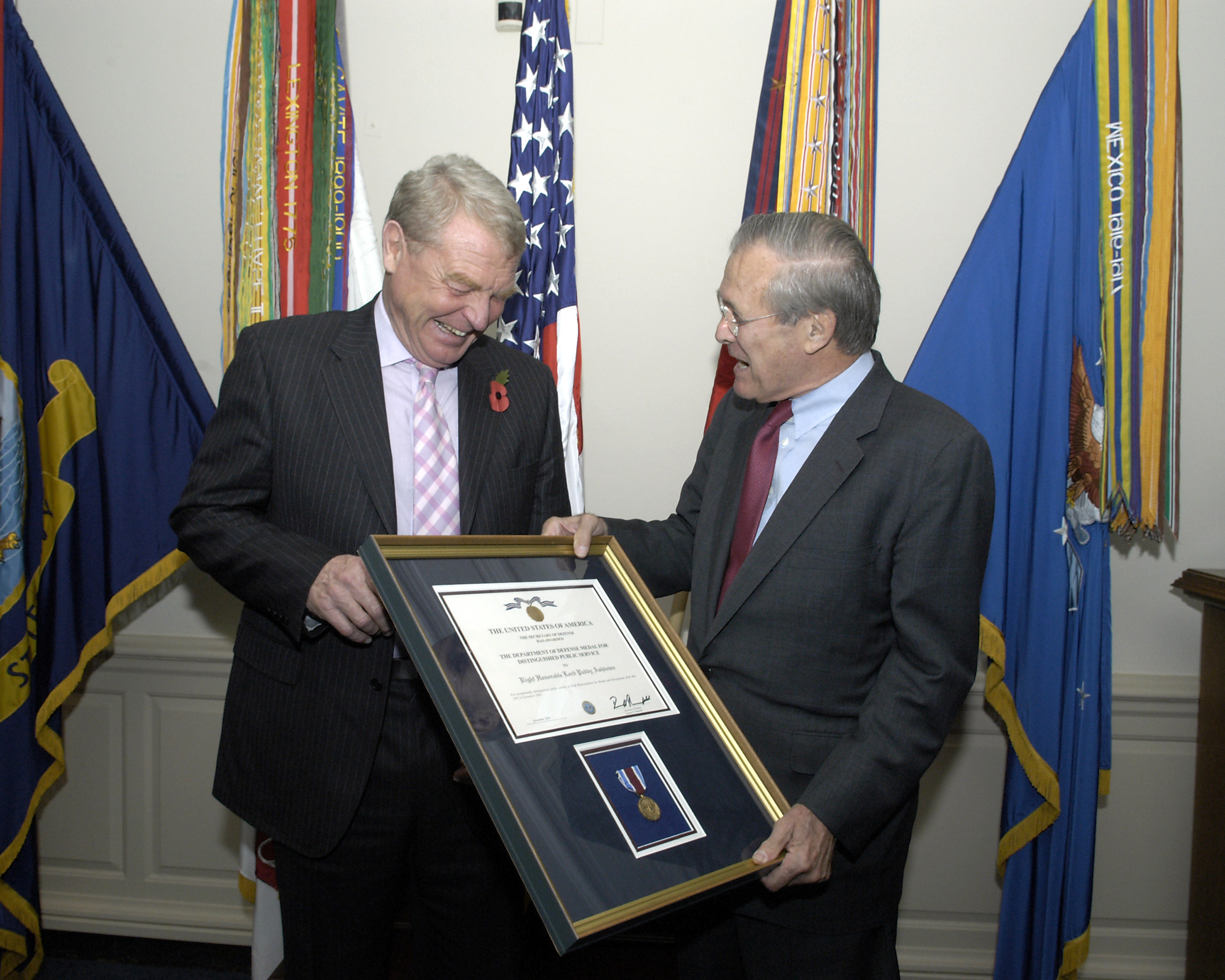
Ashdown accepting the Department of Defense Medal for Distinguished Public Service from US defence secretary Donald Rumsfeld in 2004

After leaving frontline British politics, he accepted the post of the High Representative for Bosnia and Herzegovina on 27 May 2002, reflecting his long-time advocacy of international intervention in that region. He succeeded Wolfgang Petritsch in the position created under the Dayton Agreement. During his time as High Representative between 2002 and 2006, he strengthened the central state institutions, brought in statewide legal bodies such as the State Investigation and Protection Agency and brought the two ethnic armies under a central civilian command, and moved Bosnia-Herzegovina toward EU integration. He was sometimes denigrated as "the Viceroy of Bosnia" by critics of his work as High Representative.

=== Witness for the prosecution at Milošević trial ===
On 14 March 2002, Ashdown testified as a witness for the prosecution at the trial of Slobodan Milošević at the International Criminal Tribunal for the former Yugoslavia. He said that he was on the Kosovo–Albania border near Junik in June 1998; from this location, through his binoculars, Ashdown claimed to have seen Serbian forces shelling several villages. In July 2005, a defence witness, General Božidar Delić, claimed by demonstrating with a topographical map of the area that Ashdown could not have been able to see the areas that he claimed to be able to see as hills, mountains and thick woods would have obstructed his view. After the Delić claims, Ashdown supplied the Tribunal with grid coordinates and a cross-section of the ground indicating that he could see the locations concerned. These coordinates indicated he was on the Kosovo–Albania border, which was a sealed border at the time. The prosecution also used new maps and topographical cross-sections indicating Ashdown's location, but their accuracy was challenged by Delić, for the location of a village was different from that shown in other maps of the area.

== Retirement ==
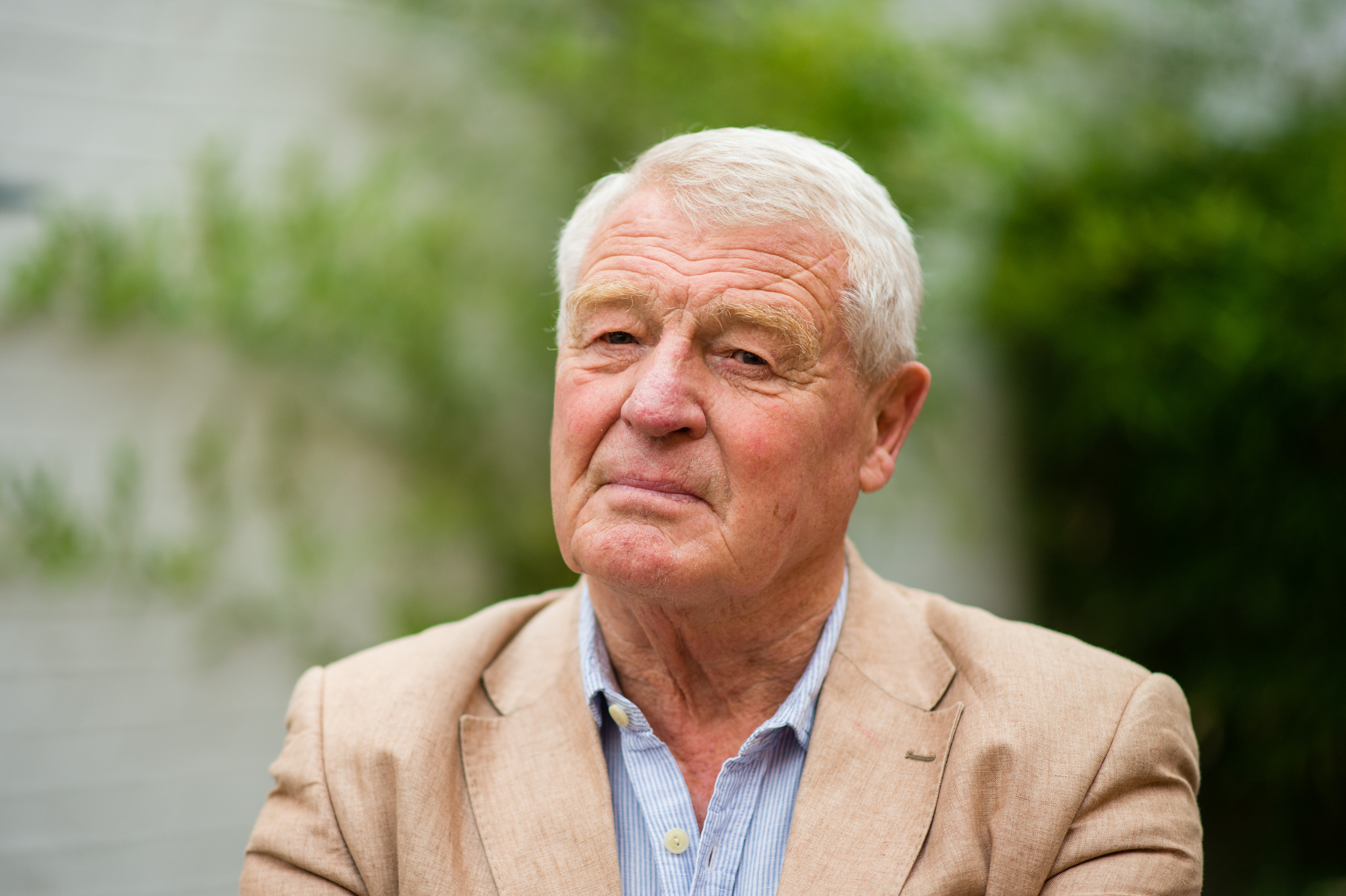
Ashdown in 2016

In retirement, Ashdown became a regular voice for the Liberal Democrats. He publicly supported military strikes in Syria in 2013 and said he was ashamed after Parliament voted against them. At the 2015 general election he appeared on the BBC soon after the announcement of the exit poll which predicted that the Liberal Democrats would be reduced from 57 MPs to 10. Ashdown said he would eat his hat if the exit poll was correct. The result was that the Liberal Democrats returned eight MPs, but the technical difference from the exit poll was not enough to save him from several requests to carry out his vow. Some commentators suggested humorously that this was an example of Liberal Democrats breaking their promises in response to U-turns conducted in the coalition government. The following day after the election, on the BBC's Question Time programme, Ashdown was presented with a chocolate hat that he later ate.

=== Offer of Cabinet post ===
In June 2007, the BBC reported that Ashdown had been offered and rejected the Cabinet post of Northern Ireland secretary by incoming Labour Party prime minister Gordon Brown. Liberal Democrat leader Sir Menzies Campbell had already ruled out the idea that members of his party would take seats in a Brown Cabinet, but, according to the reports, Brown still approached Ashdown with the offer.

=== Offer of Afghanistan post ===
Ashdown was later asked by US secretary of state Condoleezza Rice and Prime Minister Gordon Brown to take charge of the Allied effort in Afghanistan, though an unnamed source is quoted in a January 2008 Reuters report indicating that Ashdown was also approached by UN secretary-general Ban Ki-moon and met with the Afghan president Hamid Karzai secretly in Kuwait to discuss the post which he later accepted. He later decided against taking the role after gleaning that Afghanistan preferred General Sir John McColl over him. On 7 March, Norwegian diplomat Kai Eide was appointed as the UN representative for Afghanistan, stating "I'm not Paddy Ashdown, but don't under-estimate me."

=== Other positions ===
Ashdown was a member of the Governing Council of Interpeace, an international peacebuilding organisation, and also served as President of Chatham House. He later chaired the Liberal Democrats' 2015 general election team.

In 2016, Ashdown founded More United alongside several other public figures in the aftermath of the United Kingdom European Union membership referendum. More United is a liberal and progressive cross-party political movement.

== Personal life ==
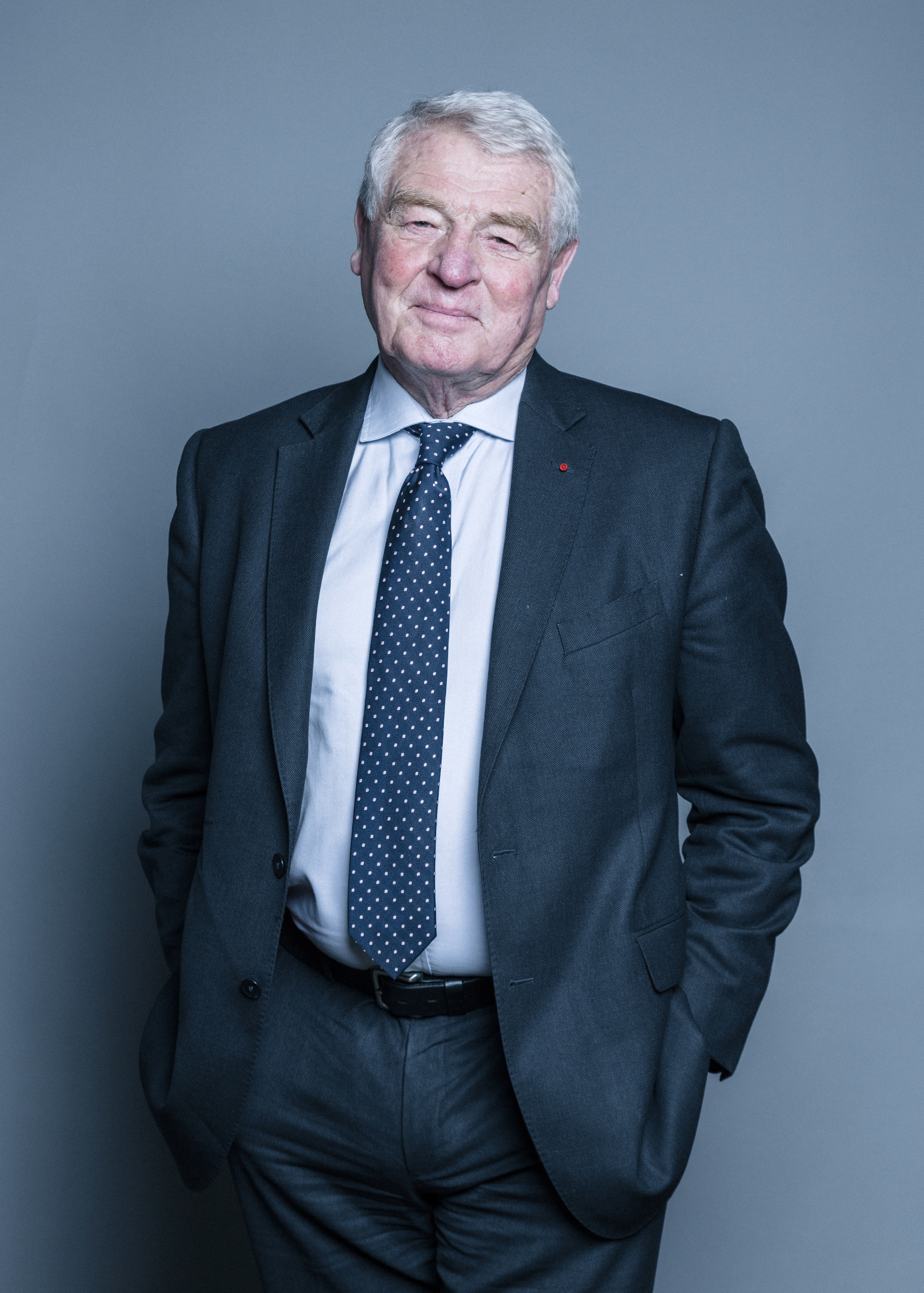
Parliamentary portrait by Chris McAndrew, March 2018

Ashdown married Jane Courtenay in 1962. The couple had a son, Simon; a daughter, Katharine; and three grandchildren. In 1992, following the press becoming aware of a stolen document relating to a divorce case, he disclosed a five-month affair with his secretary, Patricia Howard, five years earlier from which he acquired the press nickname "Paddy Pantsdown". His career and marriage both survived the political and tabloid storm, with his wife forgiving him.

Ashdown supported Yeovil Town. He was a member of the National Liberal Club.

=== Death and funeral ===
Ashdown was diagnosed with bladder cancer in October 2018. He died on 22 December at Southmead Hospital in Bristol, at the age of 77.

On 10 January 2019, a funeral service was held at Church of St Mary the Virgin, Norton-sub-Hamdon, and he was buried in the churchyard. A service of thanksgiving was held for him at Westminster Abbey on 10 September.

== Honours and awards ==
=== National honours ===

Date	Ribbon	Honour	Letters
Unknown		Naval General Service Medal with Borneo Clasp	—N/a
Unknown		General Service Medal with Northern Ireland Clasp	—N/a
19 June 2000		Knight Commander of the Order of the British Empire	KBE
31 December 2005		Knight Grand Cross of the Order of St Michael and St George	GCMG
31 December 2014		Member of the Order of the Companions of Honour	CH

=== Foreign honours ===
Country	Year	Ribbon	Honour
(France)	2017		Officer of the Legion of Honour
(United States)	2004		Department of Defense Medal for Distinguished Public Service

=== Appointments ===
- Life peer as Baron Ashdown of Norton-sub-Hamdon in the House of Lords (10 July 2001)

== In popular culture ==
In 2011, Ashdown narrated the BBC Timewatch documentary The Most Courageous Raid of WWII.

Donald Sumpter portrays Ashdown in the 2015 Channel 4 television film Coalition.

== Published works ==
- — (2000). The Ashdown Diaries 1988–1997. Vol. 1. London: Penguin. ISBN 0-14-029775-8.
- — (2002) [2001]. The Ashdown Diaries 1997–1999. Vol. 2. London: Penguin. ISBN 0-14-029776-6.
- — (2008) [2007]. Swords and Ploughshares: Building Peace in the 21st Century. London: Weidenfeld & Nicolson. ISBN 978-0-297-85303-9.
- — (2010) [2009]. A Fortunate Life: The Autobiography of Paddy Ashdown. London: Aurum. ISBN 978-1-84513-419-8.
- — (2015) [2011]. The Cruel Victory: The French Resistance, D-Day and the Battle for the Vercors 1944. London: William Collins. ISBN 978-0-00-752081-7.
- — (2012). A Brilliant Little Operation: The Cockleshell Heroes and the Most Courageous Raid of World War 2. London: Aurum. ISBN 978-1-84513-701-4.
- — (2017) [2016]. Game of Spies – The Secret Agent, the Traitor and the Nazi. London: William Collins. ISBN 978-0-00-814084-7.
- — (2018). Nein!: Standing Up to Hitler 1935–1944. London: William Collins. ISBN 978-0-00-825704-0.

== See also ==
- Hong Kong Watch, former Patron

== Notes ==
Parliament of the United Kingdom
Preceded by John Peyton	Member of Parliament for Yeovil; 1983–2001	Succeeded by David Laws
Party political offices
Preceded by David Steel; Robert Maclennan	Leader of the Liberal Democrats; 1988–1999	Succeeded by Charles Kennedy
Diplomatic posts
Preceded by Wolfgang Petritsch	High Representative for Bosnia and Herzegovina; 2002–2006	Succeeded by Christian Schwarz-Schilling
New office	European Union Special Representative for Bosnia and Herzegovina; 2002–2006	Succeeded by Christian Schwarz-Schilling
