= Lord Lieutenant of Dyfed =

Welsh county ceremonial officer

This is a list of the people who have served in the office of Lord Lieutenant of Dyfed, as created on 1 April 1974 in replacement of the former offices of Lord Lieutenant of Cardiganshire, Lord Lieutenant of Carmarthenshire, and Lord Lieutenant of Pembrokeshire.

- TRichard Hanning Philipps (former Lord Lieutenant of Pembrokeshire) 1 April 1974 – 15 February 1979, assisted by two lieutenants:
  - John Hext Lewes (former Lord Lieutenant of Cardiganshire)
  - Sir David Courtenay Mansel Lewis (former Lord Lieutenant of Carmarthenshire)
- Sir David Courtenay Mansel Lewis 15 February 1979 – 16 December 2002
- John Morris, Baron Morris of Aberavon 16 December 2002 – 5 November 2006
- Robin William Lewis 17 September 2007 – 6 February 2016
- Sara Edwards 7 February 2016 – present
