= Norton-sub-Hamdon =

Village in Somerset, England

Coordinates: 50.9406°N 2.7555°W

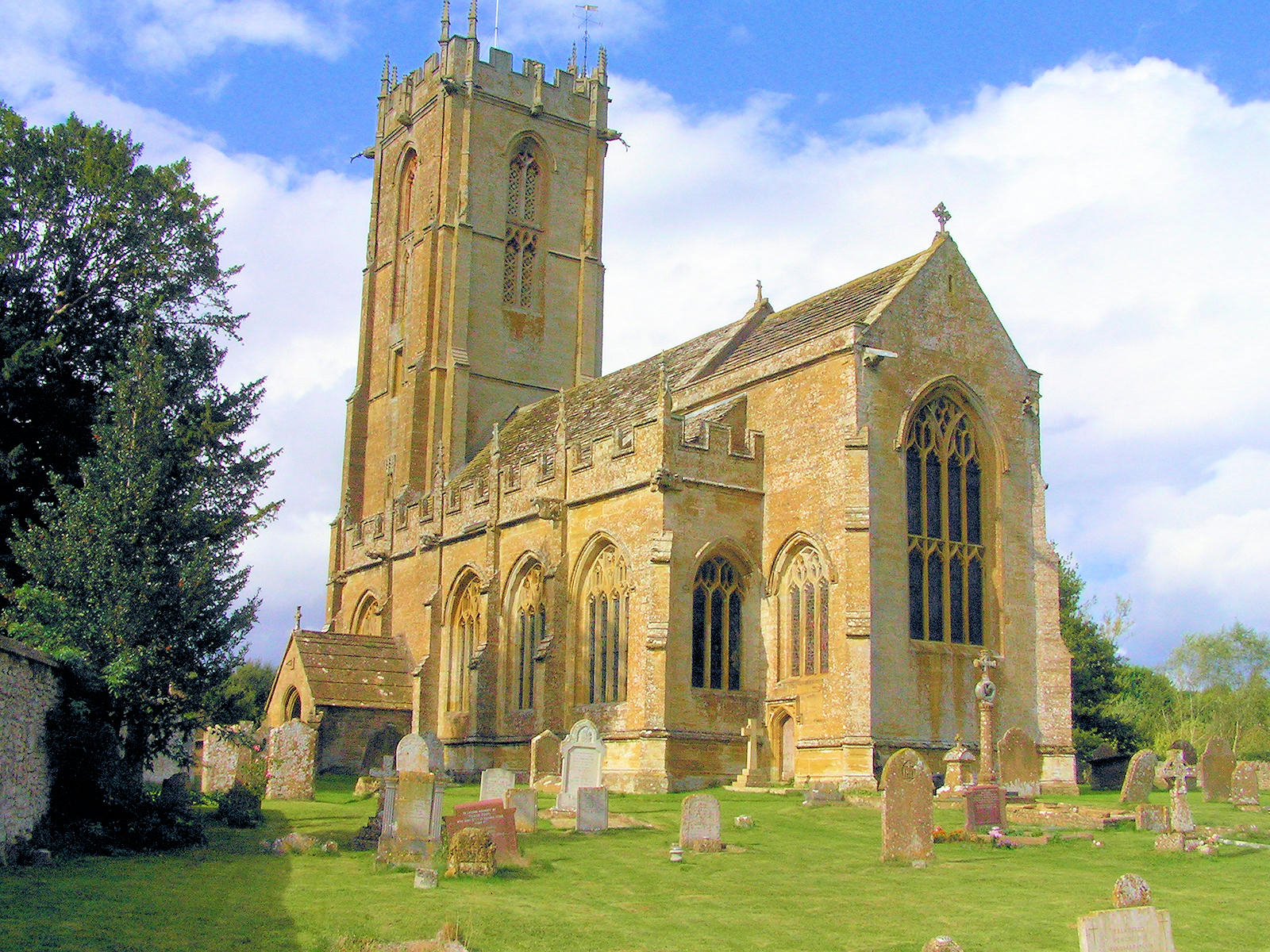
- St Mary's Church

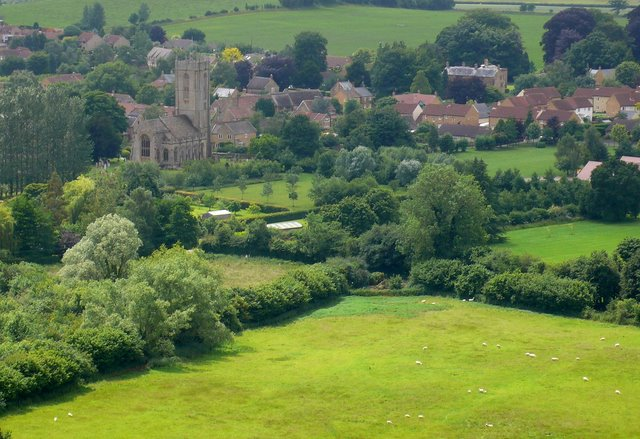
- Aerial view of village centre

- Location within Somerset
- Population: 727 (in 2021)
- OS grid reference: ST470159
- Unitary authority: Somerset
- Ceremonial county: Somerset
- Region: South West
- Country: England
- Sovereign state: United Kingdom
- Post town: STOKE-SUB-HAMDON
- Postcode district: TA14
- Dialling code: 01935
- Police: Avon and Somerset
- Fire: Devon and Somerset
- Ambulance: South Western
- UK Parliament: Glastonbury and Somerton
- Website: Parish Council

Norton-sub-Hamdon is a village and civil parish in the South Somerset district of the English county of Somerset, about ten miles west of Yeovil. The population of the parish at the 2021 census was 727.

The village of Chiselborough is 0.5 miles (0.8 km) to the south, and the village of Stoke-sub-Hamdon 1 mile (1.6 km) to the north.

== History ==
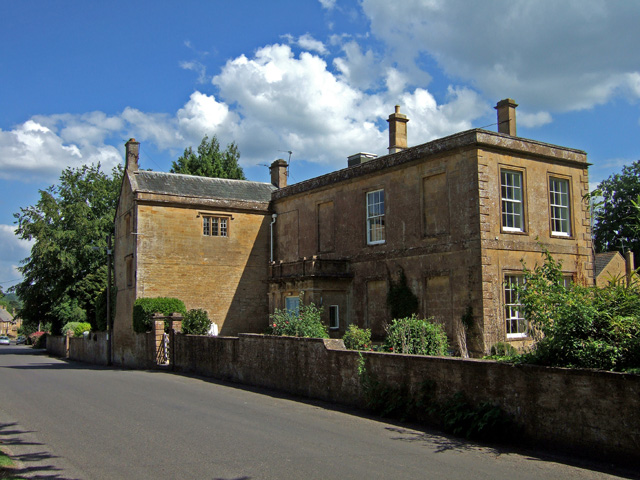
The Manor House

The majority of the houses and cottages in the village are made from the local stone, hamstone, which is taken from the nearby Ham Hill, from which the village gets its name: Norton sub Hamdon means "north farm below the hill farm".

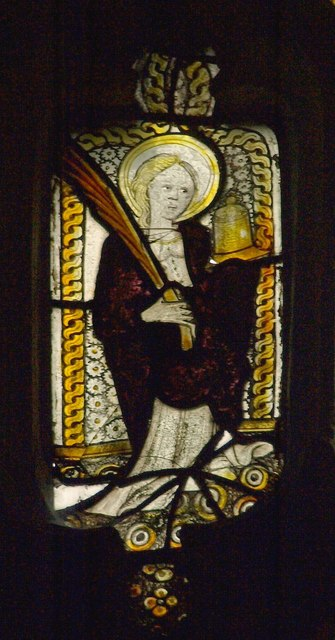
One of the stained glass windows in the church

After the Norman Conquest the manor was granted to Robert, Count of Mortain, who gave it to Grestein Abbey in Normandy, which administered it through Wilmington Priory in Sussex until it was confiscated by the crown in the 14th century. It was then given to the De la Pole family and inherited with the dukedom of Suffolk by the Seymours and in 1671 by the Earl of Aylesbury, before being broken up and sold off.

The parish was part of the hundred of Houndsborough.

== Governance ==
There is a parish council.

The village falls within the Non-metropolitan district of South Somerset, which was formed on 1 April 1974 under the Local Government Act 1972. It has previously been part of Yeovil Rural District, and the county of Somerset.

It is also part of the Glastonbury and Somerton county constituency represented in the House of Commons of the Parliament of the United Kingdom. The constituency elects one Member of Parliament (MP) by the first past the post system of election.

== Little Norton ==
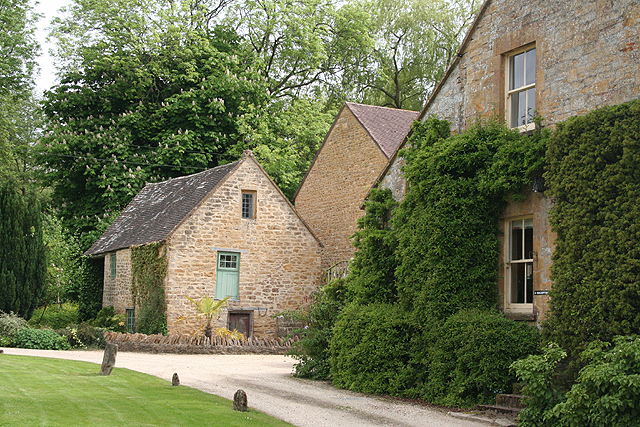
Little Norton The mill is in the background

Little Norton is a more or less contiguous hamlet to the east that includes the western fringe of Ham Hill an ancient hillfort (and scheduled Ancient Monument and extends also to its southeast to High Wood and Bagnel Farm which is listed building.

The only other listed building in the neighbourhood is the central Little Norton Mill, which is also Grade II listed; its overshot waterwheel is 13 feet 9 inches (4.19 m) in diameter and was cast by G. Parsons of the Parrett engineers.

== Landmarks ==
Homefield in Rectory Lane was previously known as Folly's. It dates from the 17th century and has been designated as a Grade II* listed building.

The manor house was built in the 17th century and is now in multiple occupation.

The village pub, the Lord Nelson Inn, also has 17th-century origins.

== Education ==
The original primary school dates from the mid 18th century. It is situated next to the churchyard and its dovecote. A new school beside the Recreation Field was opened in 1997.

== Religious sites ==
The Church of St Mary the Virgin has 13th-century origins, but was largely rebuilt between 1500 and 1510. Further restoration was undertaken by Henry Wilson in 1894 and 1904. The five-stage tower, which rises 98.5 feet (30 m), was damaged by lightning and fire on 29 July 1894, but restored within a year, preserving the original design. It has a double plinth, offset corner buttresses, dividing strings, battlemented parapet with pairs of corner pinnacles extended from buttresses, and central paired pinnacles corbelled off gargoyles. The dovecote in the churchyard dates from the 17th century, and was associated with a manor house which was demolished around 1850.

== Notable residents ==
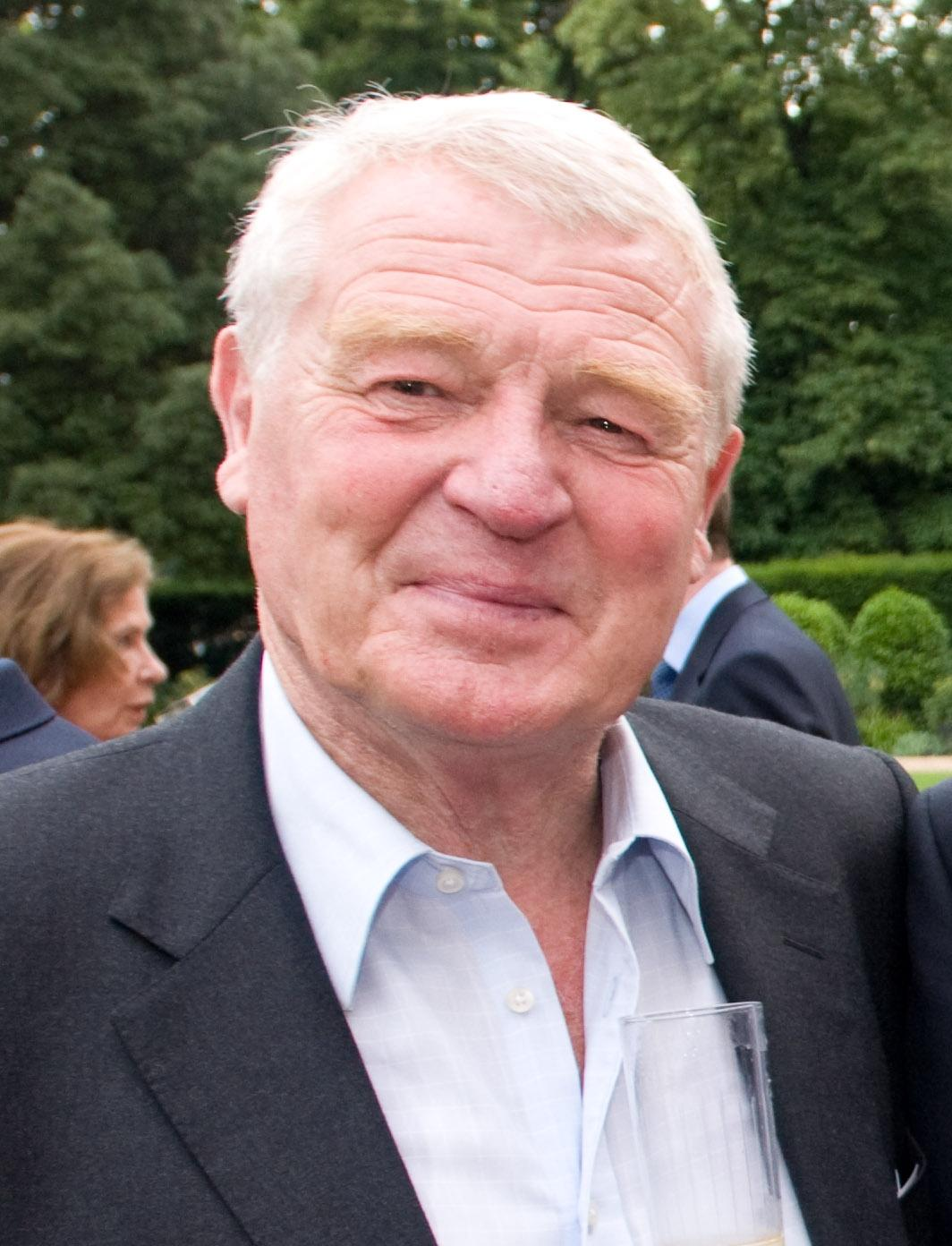
Paddy Ashdown

- John James Henry Sturmey (1857–1930), known as Henry Sturmey, is best remembered as the inventor with James Archer of the Sturmey-Archer three-speed hub for bicycles; he was also a technical editor and journalist heavily involved as a pioneer of the cycling and automotive industries. He was born at Norton-sub-Hamdon.
- Samuel Lawrence (1879–1959), Canadian politician and trade unionist, was born in the village. He emigrated to Canada, settling in Hamilton, Ontario with his family in 1912. In 1934 he was elected to the Legislative Assembly of Ontario as the Member of the Legislative Assembly (MLA) for Hamilton East.
- The village was home to Paddy Ashdown, local MP and ex-leader of the Liberal Democrats. He was knighted in 2000 and became a life peer as Lord Ashdown of Norton-sub-Hamdon in the County of Somerset after retiring from the Commons in 2001. He is buried on the north side of the churchyard.
