= Dai Francis (trade union leader) =

Dai Francis (1911–1981) was a British trade unionist, best remembered for his leadership of the South Wales Miners' Union during the 1970s. As a member of the Gorsedd of the National Eisteddfod of Wales, he took the bardic name Dai o'r Onllwyn.

Francis was born at Onllwyn, near Neath, Glamorgan. He became the first officer of the South Wales Miners' Union in 1959, and in 1963 became its General Secretary. A member of the Communist Party from 1938, he championed the 'Parliament for Wales' campaign in the 1950s, the Anti-Apartheid Movement in the 1960s and 1970s and also served as Chair of the Wales Committee against Racism in the late 1970s. In 1974 he became the first chairman of the Wales TUC. He retired in 1976, and in the same year unsuccessfully challenged Charles, Prince of Wales, in the election for Chancellor of the University of Wales.

Francis' son, Hywel, later became a Member of Parliament.

Trade union offices
| Preceded by D. D. Evans | General Secretary of the South Wales Area of the National Union of Mineworkers; 1963–1976 | Succeeded by George Rees |
| Preceded by Len Murray as chair | President of the Wales TUC; 1974–1975 | Succeeded by W. John Jones |
