= William Cove =

British politician (1888–1963)

William George Cove (21 May 1888 – 15 March 1963) was a British politician. He served as a Labour Party Member of Parliament (MP) from 1923 to 1959.

== Early life ==
Cove was born in Halifax Terrace, Middle Rhondda, to Edwin and Elizabeth Cove. His father, a miner, was born in Berkeley in Gloucestershire and was among the thousands from the west of England who migrated to the Rhondda Valleys at the end of the nineteenth century to seek work in the rapidly expanding coal industry. His mother was a native of Aberdare.

== Early career ==
Cove trained as a teacher and in 1911 was employed as a teacher by Rhondda Urban Council. He participated in the foundation of the Teachers Labour League.

== Political career ==
Cove was first elected to Parliament in the 1923 general election for the Northamptonshire constituency of Wellingborough, where he succeeded the National Liberal MP Geoffrey Shakespeare. In the 1929 general election, Cove left Wellingborough to become MP for the Welsh constituency of Aberavon, where the Labour Leader Ramsay MacDonald had stood down to stand for the County Durham seat of Seaham. Cove remained MP for Aberavon until he retired at the 1959 general election after 36 years in the Commons, he was succeeded at Aberavon by John Morris. He died in 1963 aged 74 in Chipping Norton, Oxfordshire.

Cove has been neglected by historians and he does not feature in the Dictionary of Welsh Biography.

== Sources ==
=== Books and Journals ===
- Howard, Chris (1996). "'The Focus of the Mute Hopes of a Whole Class'. Ramsay Macdonald and Aberavon, 1922-29" (PDF). Llafur: Journal of Welsh People's History. 7 (1): 68–77.

=== Other sources ===
- Leigh Rayment's Historical List of MPs
- British Parliamentary Election Results 1918-1949, compiled and edited by F.W.S. Craig (The Macmillan Press 1979)

Parliament of the United Kingdom
Preceded by Geoffrey Shakespeare	Member of Parliament for Wellingborough; 1923 – 1929	Succeeded by George Dallas
Preceded by Ramsay MacDonald	Member of Parliament for Aberavon; 1929 – 1959	Succeeded by John Morris
Trade union offices
Preceded by G. H. Powell	President of the National Union of Teachers; 1922–1923	Succeeded by E. J. Sainsbury
