= John Edwards (Welsh politician) =

British politician (1882–1960)

Member of Parliament for Aberavon
- In office 1918–1922
- Preceded by: Constituency established
- Succeeded by: Ramsay MacDonald

Personal details
- Born: 28 February 1882
- Died: 23 May 1960 (aged 78)
- Party: Liberal Party
- Spouse: Gweno Bryan
- Parents: Reverend James Edwards (father); Rachel Jones (mother)
- Education: University College of Wales, Aberystwyth; University of London

Military service
- Allegiance: United Kingdom
- Branch/service: British Army
- Rank: Lieutenant-Colonel or Major
- Unit: Royal Welch Fusiliers
- Awards: Distinguished Service Order; Mentioned in Dispatches

John Edwards (28 February 1882 – 23 May 1960) was a British politician. He was a Coalition Liberal Member of Parliament (MP) from 1918 to 1922.

At the time of his election to Parliament, Edwards was described as a schoolmaster who had served four years in the Army during the First World War, reaching the rank of Major and seeing much active service. He was first elected to Parliament in the 1918 general election for the Welsh constituency of Aberavon. He served only one term in Parliament before being defeated at the 1922 general election. Ramsay MacDonald, who served as Leader of the Labour Party and Prime Minister, replaced him as Aberavon's MP. Edwards died in 1960 aged 78.

== Family and education ==
Edwards was born at Llanbardarn, near Aberystwyth, the son of the Reverend James Edwards, the minister of Soar Congregational Chapel and his wife Rachel (née Jones). When he was still young the family moved to his mother's home town of Neath, (where his father took charge of another chapel of the same name) and he was educated at the British and Intermediate Schools in the town. He later went to University College of Wales, Aberystwyth and the University of London. In 1932, he married Gweno Bryan, a niece of the poet Robert Bryan, and they had two sons and a daughter.

== Career ==
During the First World War, Edwards joined the Royal Welch Fusiliers earning the Distinguished Service Order in 1918 and being twice mentioned in despatches. According to one source he attained the rank of Lieutenant-Colonel. Edwards also trained for the law and in 1921 he was called to the Bar at Gray's Inn.

== Politics ==
After his defeat at Aberavon in 1922, Edwards sought re-election to the House of Commons as an Independent Liberal for the University of Wales seat at the 1923 general election but in a tight contest, with three candidates each getting about one third of the vote, he finished bottom of the poll. He did not stand for Parliament again.

== Other public appointments ==
Edwards was appointed a High Sheriff of Cardiganshire in 1942. He also served as a member of the Court of the University of Wales and the Court and Council of the University College of Wales at Aberystwyth.

== Publications ==
Edwards took an active interest in Welsh drama and in 1925 he published a book, The Call of the Sea. He also published a number of articles in law journals. He also wrote a biography of his father, the Reverend James Edwards, under the title Edwards Castellnedd.

Parliament of the United Kingdom
New constituency	Member of Parliament for Aberavon; 1918 – 1922	Succeeded by Ramsay MacDonald
