= Church of St Mary the Virgin, Norton-sub-Hamdon =

Church in Somerset, England

Church of St Mary the Virgin
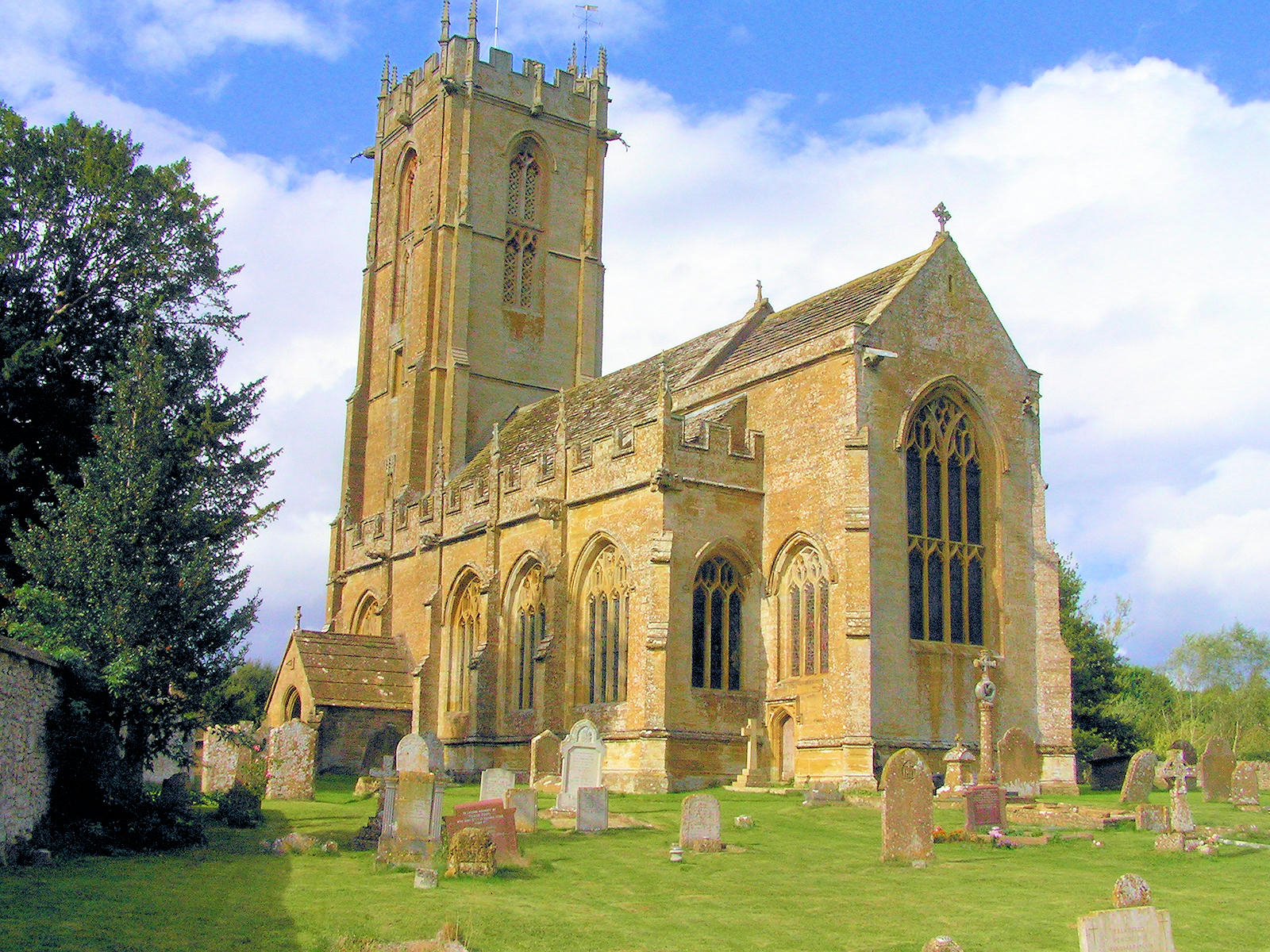

- Location within Somerset
- 50°56′24″N 2°45′13″W
- Location: Norton-sub-Hamdon, Somerset, England

History
- Built: 16th century

Listed Building – Grade I
- Official name: Church of St Mary the Virgin
- Designated: 19 April 1961
- Reference no.: 1253811

The Church of St Mary the Virgin in Norton-sub-Hamdon, Somerset, England, has 13th-century origins but was rebuilt around 1510. It has been designated as a Grade I listed building.

Restoration was undertaken by Henry Wilson in 1894 and again in 1904.

The five-stage tower, dating from around 1485, which rises 98.5 feet (30 m) was damaged by lightning and fire on 29 July 1894, but restored within a year preserving the original design. It has a double plinth, offset corner buttresses, dividing strings, battlemented parapet with pairs of corner pinnacles extended from buttresses, and central paired pinnacles corbelled off gargoyles.

The dovecote in the churchyard dates from the 17th century, and was associated with a manor house which was demolished around 1850.

Former leader of the Liberal Democrats and High Representative for Bosnia and Herzegovina Paddy Ashdown is buried in the church's graveyard.

== See also ==
- List of Grade I listed buildings in South Somerset
- List of towers in Somerset
- List of ecclesiastical parishes in the Diocese of Bath and Wells
