= Adult educator =

An adult educator (AE) is one who practices the profession of facilitating the learning of adults by applying the principles of andragogy. The broader term of trainer is sometimes used for an adult educator when listing job categories. However, a trainer is not necessarily an adult educator. As Malcolm Knowles proposes, to be a successful adult educator, one must recognize that adult learners are self-directed. That is, they know basically what they need to learn at a given point in their career and seek to engage in the process of their learning through active participation.

== Work ==
The adult educator applies the principles of adult learning to the six phases of course development: determining learner needs; writing learning objectives to fulfill those needs; creating a learning plan; selecting learning methodologies geared to the adult learner; implementing the learning plan; and evaluating the degree to which the learning objectives have been met. Central to the creation of the learning plan is the realization of how adults learn most naturally and incorporating that knowledge into every aspect of the practice of adult education.

Adult learners tend to be very practical learners. That is, they wish to see the application of their learning almost immediately. To better insure that this happens, the adult educator must understand the basics of the work, the work environment and the challenges facing the adults engaged in that work. This information is obtained during the needs assessment phase of course development.

Knowles' theories on adult education were further enhanced by the work of David A. Kolb. Kolb proposes that adult learners learn through reflective observation, abstract conceptualization, active experimentation, and concrete experience. Kolb recommends that adult educators create learning plans that incorporate the four learning styles so as to make learning more successful.

We see adult educators in many contexts. They teach adults in university settings, in government organizations and in for profit companies. When Knowles wrote about adult education in the 1950s, he was referring to the classroom environment. Today with the opportunities presented through elearning, the adult educator can reach adult learners virtually any time, anywhere.

The term is attributed to Malcolm Knowles, an American educator, who wrote The Modern Practice of Adult Education: From Pedagogy to Andragogy (1980).

Kolb identifies four basic ways adults learn through his studies of how adults take-in (prehend) knowledge and how they apply (transform) knowledge into practice.

An adult educator can assume one or more of the following work: analysing, assessing, consulting, curriculum design & development, facilitation/training, instructional design, learning/training & development and researching.

In Singapore, there is a national professionalisation called the Adult Education Professionalisation (AEP) initiative for Adult Educators. The Adult Education Professionalisation (AEP) initiative aims to create a strong, dynamic and forward-looking Adult Education profession in Singapore. AEP aims to advance the professional standards and identity of Adult Educators as professionals recognised for both pedagogical and professional excellence. To raise the quality and professionalism of the Training and Adult Education sector, AEP prioritises opportunities for Adult Educators to continue to deepen their professional skills, and to be accredited for mastery of skills achieved. AEP regards Adult Educators as having a crucial role to play in supporting the national SkillsFuture movement to impart knowledge and skills to our workforce.
