= Aberavon (UK Parliament constituency) =

UK Parliament constituency (1918–2024)

Coordinates: 51.600°N 3.812°W

- Former county constituency for the House of Commons
- Boundary of Aberavon in Wales for the 2019 general election
- Preserved county: West Glamorgan
- Population: 66,133 (2011 census)
- Electorate: 50,747 (December 2019)
- Major settlements: Port Talbot

1918–2024
- Seats: One
- Created from: Swansea District and Mid Glamorganshire
- Replaced by: Aberafan Maesteg, Neath and Swansea East
- Senedd: Aberavon, South Wales West

Aberavon (Welsh: Aberafan) was a constituency in Wales in the House of Commons of the Parliament of the United Kingdom. It was represented from 1922 until 2024 by the Welsh Labour Party. It included the town of Aberavon, although the largest town in the constituency was Port Talbot.

The constituency was abolished as part of the 2023 periodic review of Westminster constituencies and under the June 2023 final recommendations of the Boundary Commission for Wales for the 2024 general election. Its area was split between Aberafan Maesteg and Neath and Swansea East.

== History ==
The constituency was created for the 1918 general election by the dividing of the Swansea District. With the exception of the first term, it has always been held by the Labour Party. Ramsay MacDonald, who became Labour's first Prime Minister in 1924, held the seat from 1922 to 1929. Its final MP, Stephen Kinnock, is the son of Neil Kinnock, who was Labour leader and Leader of the Opposition from 1983 to 1992.

It was one of the most consistently safe seats for Labour; since the end of the Second World War, the Labour candidate had always won Aberavon with a majority at least 33%, and with the exception of 2015, the Labour candidate has also always won an overall majority of the vote in the seat. In 2015, Kinnock only won 48.9% of the vote in Aberavon, against a surge in the vote for the UKIP candidate; however, in 2017, Kinnock's vote share rose by 19.2 percentage points, the biggest increase in the Labour vote in the seat's history, and his majority increased to 50.4%, the highest for an Aberavon MP since 2001. The 2017 result also made Aberavon the safest Labour seat in Wales, however the seat saw a significant swing against Labour in 2019.

== Boundaries ==
Map of boundaries 2010–2024

1918–1950: The Borough of Aberavon, the Urban Districts of Briton Ferry, Glencorwg, Margam, and Porthcawl and part of the Rural Districts of Neath and Penybont.

1950–1983: The Borough of Port Talbot, the Urban Districts of Glyncorrwg and Porthcawl, and part of the Rural District of Penybont.

1983–1997: The Borough of Afan, and the Borough of Neath wards nos. 3 and 6.

1997–2010: The Borough of Port Talbot; and the Borough of Neath wards of Briton Ferry East, Briton Ferry West, Coedffranc Central, Coedffranc North, and Coedffranc West.

2010–2024: The Neath Port Talbot County Borough electoral divisions of Aberavon, Baglan, Briton Ferry East, Briton Ferry West, Bryn and Cwmavon, Coedffranc Central, Coedffranc North, Coedffranc West, Cymmer, Glyncorrwg, Gwynfi, Margam, Port Talbot, Sandfields East, Sandfields West, and Tai-bach.

The constituency was in South Wales, situated on the right bank of the River Afan, near its mouth in Swansea Bay.

Commenting on the 1983 boundary changes to the constituency when moving the 2000 Loyal Address of the Blair Government in Parliament, the seat's then-MP Sir John Morris, who would retire at the 2001 general election, said:

"It is a happy tradition on this occasion to refer to one's constituency and to the people who sent one here....Whatever may occur in future, I would deplore the loss of the Member-constituency link. When, after 23 years, I lost part of my constituency, I missed the friendship of two generations. My constituents and I had grown up and grown older together."

== Members of Parliament ==
| Election | Member | Party |
|---|---|---|
| 1918 | Jack Edwards | Coalition Liberal |
| 1922 | Jack Edwards | National Liberal |
| 1922 | Rt Hon. Ramsay MacDonald | Labour |
| 1929 | William Cove | Labour |
| 1959 | Sir John Morris | Labour |
| 2001 | Hywel Francis | Labour |
| 2015 | Stephen Kinnock | Labour |
| 2024 | Constituency abolished | |

== Elections ==
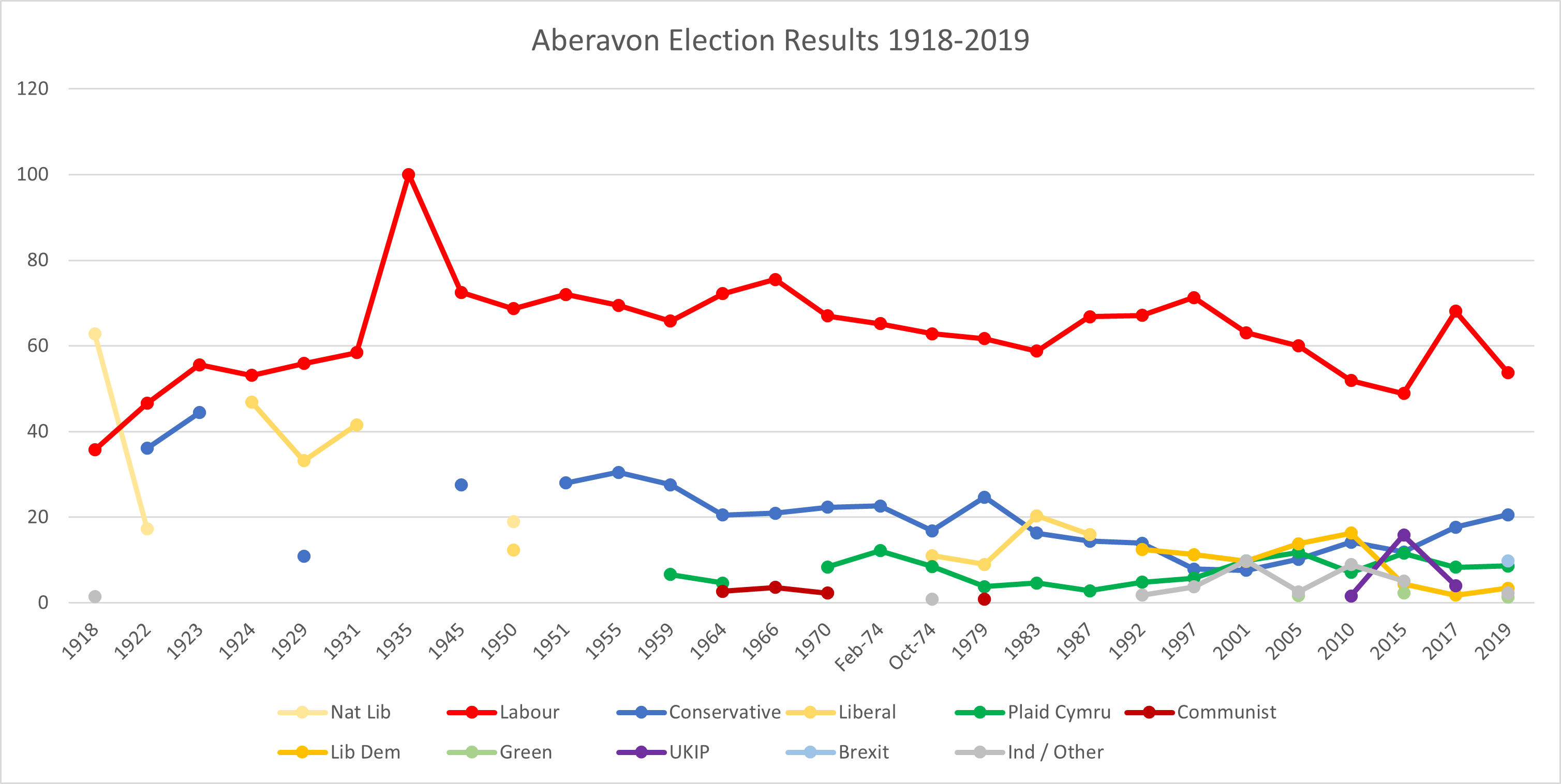
Aberavon Election Results 1918–2019

=== Elections in the 1910s ===
1918 general election: Aberavon
| Party | | Candidate | Votes | % |
|---|---|---|---|---|
| C | National Liberal | Jack Edwards | 13,635 | 62.8 |
| | Labour | Robert Williams | 7,758 | 35.7 |
| | NFDDSS | T G Jones* | 324 | 1.5 |
| Majority | | | 5,877 | 27.1 |
| Turnout | | | 21,697 | 71.4 |
| Registered electors | | | 30,415 | |
| | National Liberal win (new seat) | | | |
C indicates candidate endorsed by the coalition government.

- Jones withdrew in favour of Edwards on 13 December 1918.

=== Elections in the 1920s ===
1922 general election: Aberavon
| Party | Candidate | Votes | % | ±% |
|---|---|---|---|---|
| Labour | Ramsay MacDonald | 14,318 | 46.6 | +10.9 |
| Unionist | Sidney Hutchinson Byass | 11,111 | 36.1 | N/A |
| National Liberal | Jack Edwards | 5,238 | 17.3 | −45.5 |
| Majority | | 3,207 | 10.5 | N/A |
| Turnout | | 30,667 | 88.6 | +17.2 |
| Registered electors | | 34,716 | | |
| Labour gain from National Liberal | | Swing | +28.2 | |

1923 general election: Aberavon
| Party | Candidate | Votes | % | ±% |
|---|---|---|---|---|
| Labour | Ramsay MacDonald | 17,439 | 55.6 | +9.0 |
| Unionist | Sidney Hutchinson Byass | 13,927 | 44.4 | +8.3 |
| Majority | | 3,512 | 11.2 | +0.7 |
| Turnout | | 31,366 | 87.2 | −1.4 |
| Registered electors | | 39,750 | | |
| Labour hold | | Swing | +0.3 | |

1924 general election: Aberavon
| Party | Candidate | Votes | % | ±% |
|---|---|---|---|---|
| Labour | Ramsay MacDonald | 17,724 | 53.1 | −2.5 |
| Liberal | William Henry Williams | 15,624 | 46.9 | N/A |
| Majority | | 2,100 | 6.2 | −5.0 |
| Turnout | | 33,348 | 89.6 | +2.4 |
| Registered electors | | 37,200 | | |
| Labour hold | | Swing | | |

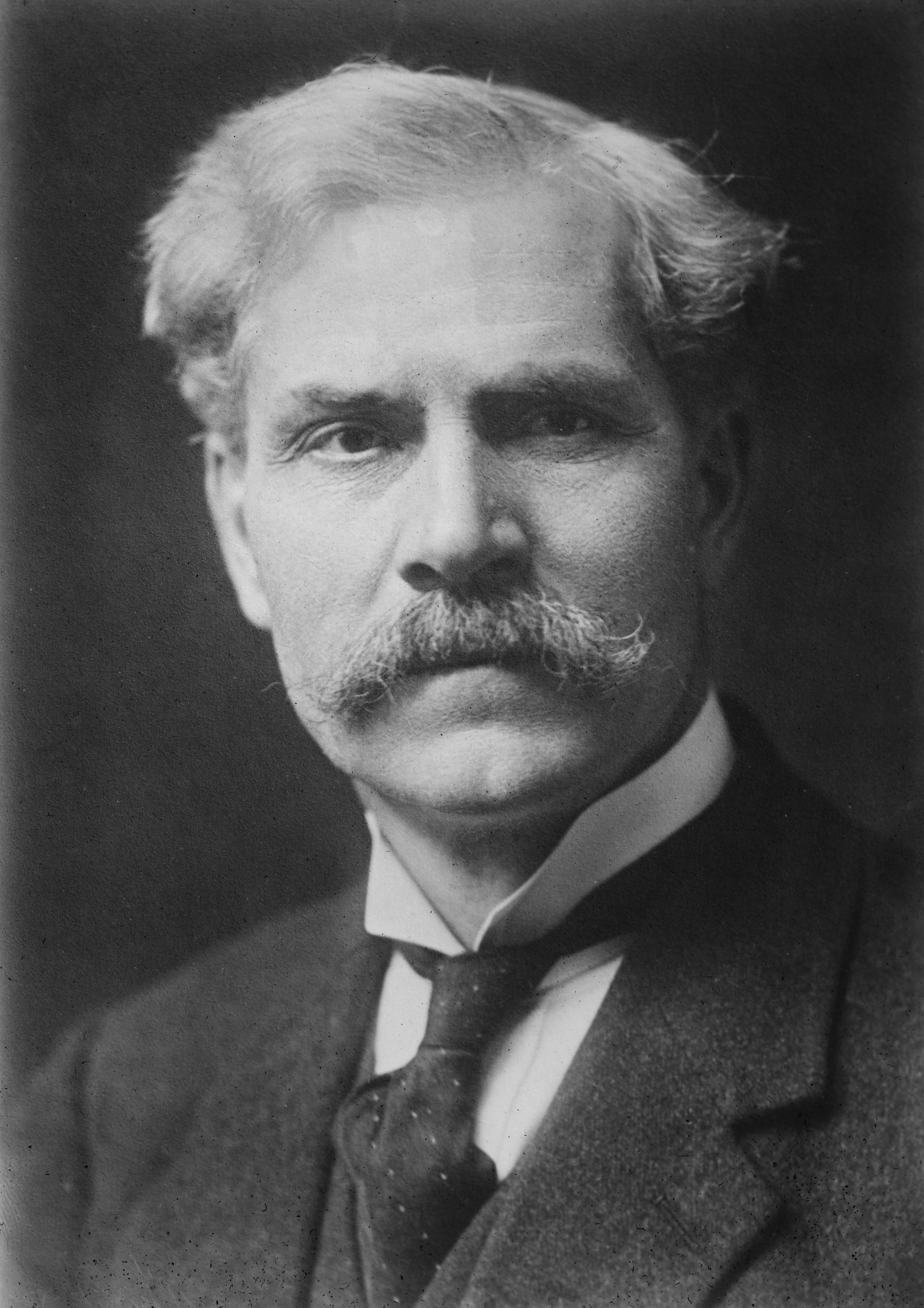
Ramsay MacDonald

1929 general election: Aberavon
| Party | Candidate | Votes | % | ±% |
|---|---|---|---|---|
| Labour | William Cove | 22,194 | 55.9 | +2.8 |
| Liberal | William Henry Williams | 13,155 | 33.2 | −13.7 |
| Unionist | Francis Bertram Reece | 4,330 | 10.9 | N/A |
| Majority | | 9,039 | 22.7 | +16.5 |
| Turnout | | 39,679 | 87.0 | −2.6 |
| Registered electors | | 45,613 | | |
| Labour hold | | Swing | +8.2 | |

Henry Williams

=== Elections in the 1930s ===
1931 general election: Aberavon
| Party | Candidate | Votes | % | ±% |
|---|---|---|---|---|
| Labour | William Cove | 23,029 | 58.4 | +2.5 |
| Liberal | Edward Curran | 16,378 | 41.6 | +8.4 |
| Majority | | 6,651 | 16.9 | −5.8 |
| Turnout | | 39,407 | 84.4 | −2.6 |
| Registered electors | | 46,689 | | |
| Labour hold | | Swing | −3.0 | |

1935 general election: Aberavon
| Party | Candidate | Votes | % | ±% |
|---|---|---|---|---|
| Labour | William Cove | Unopposed | | |
| Registered electors | | 49,729 | | |
| Labour hold | | | | |

=== Elections in the 1940s ===
1945 general election: Aberavon
| Party | Candidate | Votes | % | ±% |
|---|---|---|---|---|
| Labour | William Cove | 31,286 | 72.5 | N/A |
| Conservative | David Llewellyn | 11,860 | 27.5 | N/A |
| Majority | | 19,426 | 45.0 | N/A |
| Turnout | | 43,146 | 79.4 | N/A |
| Registered electors | | 54,323 | | |
| Labour hold | | Swing | N/A | |

=== Elections in the 1950s ===
1950 general election: Aberavon
| Party | Candidate | Votes | % | ±% |
|---|---|---|---|---|
| Labour | William Cove | 29,278 | 68.7 | −3.8 |
| National Liberal | Auberon Herbert | 8,091 | 19.0 | −8.5 |
| Liberal | Maldwyn Thomas | 5,263 | 12.3 | N/A |
| Majority | | 21,187 | 49.7 | +4.7 |
| Turnout | | 42,634 | 85.8 | +6.4 |
| Registered electors | | 49,667 | | |
| Labour hold | | Swing | +2.3 | |

1951 general election: Aberavon
| Party | Candidate | Votes | % | ±% |
|---|---|---|---|---|
| Labour | William Cove | 30,498 | 72.0 | +3.3 |
| Conservative | John Loveridge | 11,878 | 28.0 | +9.0 |
| Majority | | 18,620 | 44.0 | −5.7 |
| Turnout | | 42,376 | 84.6 | −1.2 |
| Registered electors | | 50,071 | | |
| Labour hold | | Swing | −2.9 | |

1955 general election: Aberavon
| Party | Candidate | Votes | % | ±% |
|---|---|---|---|---|
| Labour | William Cove | 29,003 | 69.5 | −2.5 |
| Conservative | Geoffrey Howe | 12,706 | 30.5 | +2.5 |
| Majority | | 16,297 | 39.0 | −5.0 |
| Turnout | | 41,709 | 79.3 | −5.3 |
| Registered electors | | 52,616 | | |
| Labour hold | | Swing | −2.4 | |

1959 general election: Aberavon
| Party | Candidate | Votes | % | ±% |
|---|---|---|---|---|
| Labour | John Morris | 30,397 | 65.8 | −3.7 |
| Conservative | Geoffrey Howe | 12,759 | 27.6 | −2.9 |
| Plaid Cymru | Illtyd M. Lewis | 3,066 | 6.6 | N/A |
| Majority | | 17,638 | 38.2 | −0.8 |
| Turnout | | 46,222 | 82.1 | +2.8 |
| Registered electors | | 56,316 | | |
| Labour hold | | Swing | −0.5 | |

=== Elections in the 1960s ===
1964 general election: Aberavon
| Party | Candidate | Votes | % | ±% |
|---|---|---|---|---|
| Labour | John Morris | 33,103 | 72.2 | +6.4 |
| Conservative | John Stradling Thomas | 9,424 | 20.5 | −7.1 |
| Plaid Cymru | Glyn John | 2,118 | 4.6 | −2.0 |
| Communist | Julian Tudor Hart | 1,260 | 2.7 | N/A |
| Majority | | 23,679 | 51.7 | +13.5 |
| Turnout | | 45,905 | 80.8 | −1.3 |
| Registered electors | | 56,777 | | |
| Labour hold | | Swing | +6.7 | |

1966 general election: Aberavon
| Party | Candidate | Votes | % | ±% |
|---|---|---|---|---|
| Labour | John Morris | 33,763 | 75.5 | +3.3 |
| Conservative | Robert Hicks | 9,369 | 20.9 | +0.4 |
| Communist | Julian Tudor Hart | 1,620 | 3.6 | +0.9 |
| Majority | | 24,394 | 54.6 | +2.9 |
| Turnout | | 45,146 | 78.3 | −2.5 |
| Registered electors | | 57,179 | | |
| Labour hold | | Swing | | |

=== Elections in the 1970s ===
1970 general election: Aberavon
| Party | Candidate | Votes | % | ±% |
|---|---|---|---|---|
| Labour | John Morris | 31,314 | 67.0 | −8.5 |
| Conservative | Ian Grist | 10,419 | 22.3 | +1.4 |
| Plaid Cymru | Graham Farmer | 3,912 | 8.4 | N/A |
| Communist | Julian Tudor Hart | 1,102 | 2.3 | −1.3 |
| Majority | | 20,895 | 44.7 | −9.9 |
| Turnout | | 46,747 | 74.8 | −3.5 |
| Registered electors | | 62,516 | | |
| Labour hold | | Swing | | |

February 1974 general election: Aberavon
| Party | Candidate | Votes | % | ±% |
|---|---|---|---|---|
| Labour | John Morris | 31,656 | 65.2 | −1.8 |
| Conservative | Peter Hubbard-Miles | 10,968 | 22.6 | +0.3 |
| Plaid Cymru | D G Foster | 5,898 | 12.2 | +3.8 |
| Majority | | 20,688 | 42.6 | −2.1 |
| Turnout | | 48,522 | 75.6 | +0.8 |
| Registered electors | | 64,162 | | |
| Labour hold | | Swing | −1.0 | |

October 1974 general election: Aberavon
| Party | Candidate | Votes | % | ±% |
|---|---|---|---|---|
| Labour | John Morris | 29,683 | 62.8 | −2.4 |
| Conservative | Nigel K Hammond | 7,931 | 16.8 | −5.8 |
| Liberal | Sheila M. Cutts | 5,178 | 11.0 | N/A |
| Plaid Cymru | Geraint Thomas | 4,032 | 8.5 | −3.7 |
| Workers Revolutionary | J Bevan | 427 | 0.9 | N/A |
| Majority | | 21,752 | 46.0 | +3.4 |
| Turnout | | 47,251 | 73.1 | −2.5 |
| Registered electors | | 64,667 | | |
| Labour hold | | Swing | +1.7 | |

1979 general election: Aberavon
| Party | Candidate | Votes | % | ±% |
|---|---|---|---|---|
| Labour | John Morris | 31,665 | 61.7 | −1.1 |
| Conservative | F McCarthy | 12,692 | 24.7 | +7.9 |
| Liberal | Sheila M. Cutts | 4,624 | 9.0 | −2.0 |
| Plaid Cymru | Geraint Thomas | 1,954 | 3.8 | −4.7 |
| Communist | G Rowden | 406 | 0.8 | N/A |
| Majority | | 18,973 | 37.0 | −9.0 |
| Turnout | | 47,179 | 79.2 | +6.1 |
| Registered electors | | 64,864 | | |
| Labour hold | | Swing | | |

=== Elections in the 1980s ===
1983 general election: Aberavon
| Party | Candidate | Votes | % | ±% |
|---|---|---|---|---|
| Labour | John Morris | 23,745 | 58.8 | −2.9 |
| Liberal | Sheila M. Cutts | 8,206 | 20.3 | +11.3 |
| Conservative | George Bailey | 6,605 | 16.3 | −8.4 |
| Plaid Cymru | Glenn Phillips | 1,859 | 4.6 | +0.8 |
| Majority | | 15,539 | 38.5 | +1.5 |
| Turnout | | 40,415 | 75.6 | −3.6 |
| Registered electors | | 53,443 | | |
| Labour hold | | Swing | | |

1987 general election: Aberavon
| Party | Candidate | Votes | % | ±% |
|---|---|---|---|---|
| Labour | John Morris | 27,126 | 66.8 | +8.0 |
| Liberal | Marilyn Harris | 6,517 | 16.0 | −4.3 |
| Conservative | Paul Warwick | 5,861 | 14.4 | −1.9 |
| Plaid Cymru | Anne Howells | 1,124 | 2.8 | −1.8 |
| Majority | | 20,609 | 50.8 | +12.3 |
| Turnout | | 40,628 | 77.7 | +2.1 |
| Registered electors | | 52,280 | | |
| Labour hold | | Swing | +6.1 | |

=== Elections in the 1990s ===
1992 general election: Aberavon
| Party | Candidate | Votes | % | ±% |
|---|---|---|---|---|
| Labour | John Morris | 26,877 | 67.1 | +0.3 |
| Conservative | Hywel Williams | 5,567 | 13.9 | −0.5 |
| Liberal Democrats | Marilyn Harris | 4,999 | 12.5 | −3.5 |
| Plaid Cymru | David W. J. Saunders | 1,919 | 4.8 | +2.0 |
| Real Bean | Captain Beany | 707 | 1.8 | N/A |
| Majority | | 21,310 | 53.2 | +2.4 |
| Turnout | | 40,069 | 77.6 | −0.1 |
| Registered electors | | 51,650 | | |
| Labour hold | | Swing | +0.4 | |

1997 general election: Aberavon
| Party | Candidate | Votes | % | ±% |
|---|---|---|---|---|
| Labour | John Morris | 25,650 | 71.3 | +4.2 |
| Liberal Democrats | Ronald McConville | 4,079 | 11.3 | −1.2 |
| Conservative | Peter Harper | 2,835 | 7.9 | −6.0 |
| Plaid Cymru | Philip Cockwell | 2,088 | 5.8 | +1.0 |
| Referendum | Peter David | 970 | 2.7 | N/A |
| Independent | Captain Beany | 341 | 1.0 | −0.8 |
| Majority | | 21,571 | 60.0 | +9.6 |
| Turnout | | 35,963 | 71.9 | −5.7 |
| Registered electors | | 50,031 | | |
| Labour hold | | Swing | +1.6 | |

=== Elections in the 2000s ===
2001 general election: Aberavon
| Party | Candidate | Votes | % | ±% |
|---|---|---|---|---|
| Labour | Hywel Francis | 19,063 | 63.1 | −8.2 |
| Plaid Cymru | Lisa Turnbull | 2,955 | 9.8 | +4.0 |
| Liberal Democrats | Christopher Davies | 2,933 | 9.7 | −1.6 |
| Conservative | Ali Miraj | 2,296 | 7.6 | −0.3 |
| Independent | Andrew Tutton | 1,960 | 6.5 | N/A |
| New Millennium Bean | Captain Beany | 727 | 2.4 | +1.4 |
| Socialist Alliance | Martin Chapman | 256 | 0.8 | N/A |
| Majority | | 16,108 | 53.3 | −6.7 |
| Turnout | | 30,190 | 61.0 | −10.9 |
| Registered electors | | 49,524 | | |
| Labour hold | | Swing | −6.1 | |

2005 general election: Aberavon
| Party | Candidate | Votes | % | ±% |
|---|---|---|---|---|
| Labour | Hywel Francis | 18,077 | 60.0 | −3.1 |
| Liberal Democrats | Claire Waller | 4,140 | 13.8 | +4.1 |
| Plaid Cymru | Philip Evans | 3,545 | 11.8 | +2.0 |
| Conservative | Annunziata Rees-Mogg | 3,064 | 10.2 | +2.6 |
| Veritas | Jim Wright | 768 | 2.6 | N/A |
| Green | Miranda La Vey | 510 | 1.7 | N/A |
| Majority | | 13,937 | 46.2 | −7.1 |
| Turnout | | 30,104 | 58.9 | −1.9 |
| Registered electors | | 50,685 | | |
| Labour hold | | Swing | −3.6 | |

=== Elections in the 2010s ===
2010 general election: Aberavon
| Party | Candidate | Votes | % | ±% |
|---|---|---|---|---|
| Labour | Hywel Francis | 16,073 | 51.9 | −8.1 |
| Liberal Democrats | Keith Davies | 5,034 | 16.3 | +2.5 |
| Conservative | Caroline Jones | 4,411 | 14.2 | +4.1 |
| Plaid Cymru | Paul Nicholls-Jones | 2,198 | 7.1 | −4.7 |
| BNP | Kevin Edwards | 1,276 | 4.1 | N/A |
| Independent | Andrew Tutton | 919 | 3.0 | N/A |
| New Millennium Bean Party | Captain Beany | 558 | 1.8 | N/A |
| UKIP | Joe Callan | 489 | 1.6 | N/A |
| Rejected ballots | | 44 | | |
| Majority | | 11,039 | 35.7 | −10.5 |
| Turnout | | 30,958 | 61.0 | +2.1 |
| Registered electors | | 50,838 | | |
| Labour hold | | Swing | −5.3 | |

Of the 44 rejected ballots:

- 29 were either unmarked or it was uncertain who the vote was for.
- 14 voted for more than one candidate.
- 1 had writing or mark by which the voter could be identified.

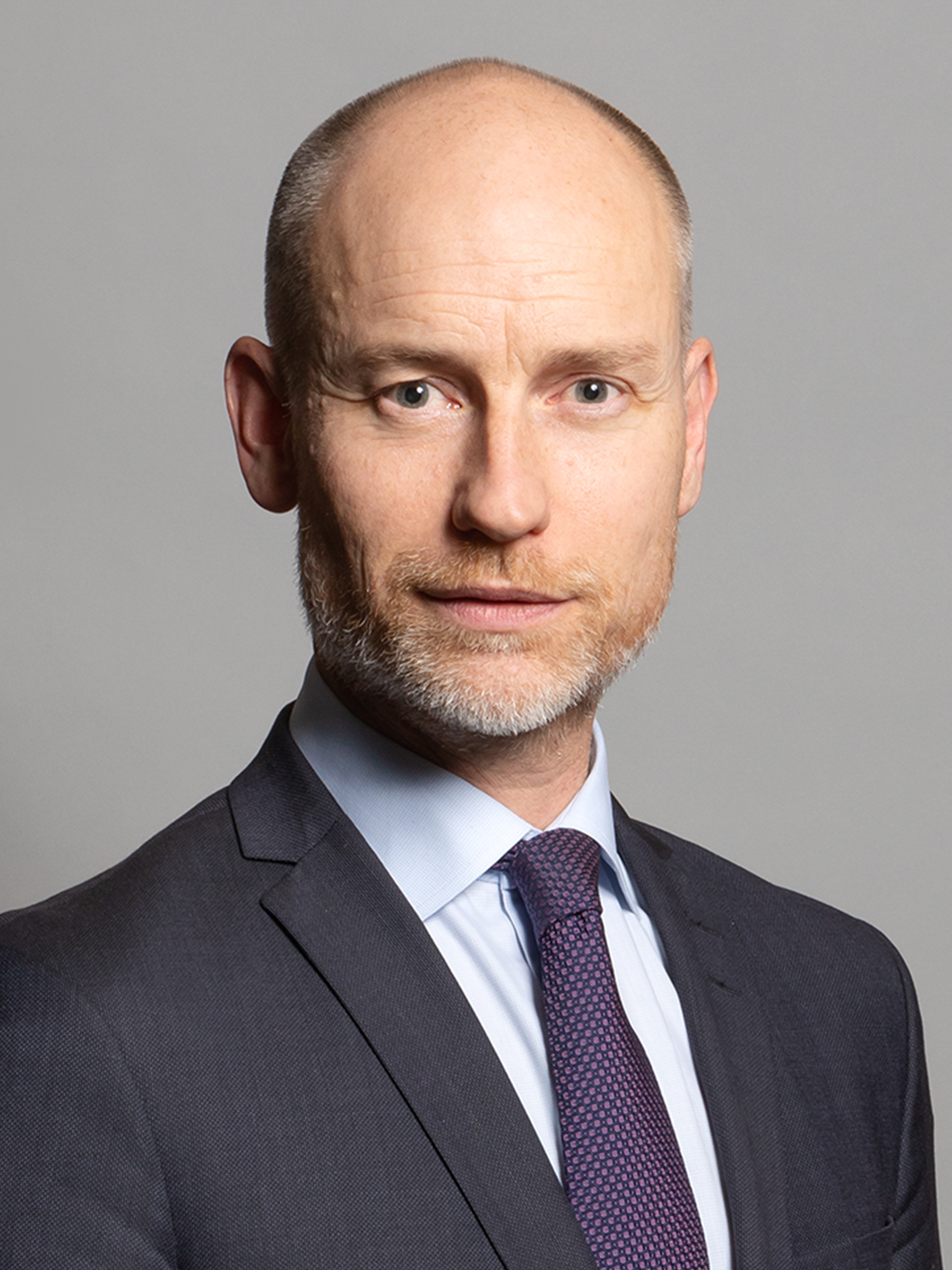
Stephen Kinnock

2015 general election: Aberavon
| Party | Candidate | Votes | % | ±% |
|---|---|---|---|---|
| Labour | Stephen Kinnock | 15,416 | 48.9 | −3.0 |
| UKIP | Peter Bush | 4,971 | 15.8 | +14.2 |
| Conservative | Edward Yi He | 3,742 | 11.9 | −2.3 |
| Plaid Cymru | Duncan Higgitt | 3,663 | 11.6 | +4.5 |
| Liberal Democrats | Helen Ceri-Clarke | 1,397 | 4.4 | −11.9 |
| Independent | Captain Beany | 1,137 | 3.6 | +1.8 |
| Green | Jonathan Tier | 711 | 2.3 | N/A |
| Socialist Labour | Andrew Jordan | 352 | 1.1 | N/A |
| TUSC | Owen Herbert | 134 | 0.4 | N/A |
| Rejected ballots | | 57 | | |
| Majority | | 10,445 | 33.1 | −2.6 |
| Turnout | | 31,523 | 63.3 | +2.3 |
| Registered electors | | 49,821 | | |
| Labour hold | | Swing | −8.6 | |

Of the 57 rejected ballots:

- 37 were either unmarked or it was uncertain who the vote was for.
- 20 voted for more than one candidate.

2017 general election: Aberavon
| Party | Candidate | Votes | % | ±% |
|---|---|---|---|---|
| Labour | Stephen Kinnock | 22,662 | 68.1 | +19.2 |
| Conservative | Sadie Vidal | 5,901 | 17.7 | +5.8 |
| Plaid Cymru | Andrew Bennison | 2,761 | 8.3 | −3.3 |
| UKIP | Caroline Jones | 1,345 | 4.0 | −11.8 |
| Liberal Democrats | Cen Phillips | 599 | 1.8 | −2.6 |
| Rejected ballots | | 57 | | |
| Majority | | 16,761 | 50.4 | +17.3 |
| Turnout | | 33,268 | 66.7 | +3.4 |
| Registered electors | | 49,892 | | |
| Labour hold | | Swing | +6.7 | |

Of the 57 rejected ballots:

- 41 were either unmarked or it was uncertain who the vote was for.
- 16 voted for more than one candidate.

2019 general election: Aberavon
| Party | Candidate | Votes | % | ±% |
|---|---|---|---|---|
| Labour | Stephen Kinnock | 17,008 | 53.8 | −14.3 |
| Conservative | Charlotte Lang | 6,518 | 20.6 | +2.9 |
| Brexit Party | Glenda Davies | 3,108 | 9.8 | N/A |
| Plaid Cymru | Nigel Hunt | 2,711 | 8.6 | +0.3 |
| Liberal Democrats | Sheila Kingston-Jones | 1,072 | 3.4 | +1.6 |
| Independent | Captain Beany | 731 | 2.3 | N/A |
| Green | Giorgia Finney | 450 | 1.4 | N/A |
| Rejected ballots | | 82 | | |
| Majority | | 10,490 | 33.2 | −17.2 |
| Turnout | | 31,598 | 62.3 | −4.4 |
| Registered electors | | 50,747 | | |
| Labour hold | | Swing | −8.6 | |

Of the 82 rejected ballots:

- 61 were either unmarked or it was uncertain who the vote was for.
- 19 voted for more than one candidate.
- 2 had writing or mark by which the voter could be identified.

== See also ==
- Aberavon (Senedd constituency)

Parliament of the United Kingdom
| Preceded by Bewdley | Constituency represented by the prime minister 22 January – 4 November 1924 | Succeeded by Bewdley |
