= Church of St Peter and St Paul, Charlton Horethorne =

Anglican church in Somerset, England

Church of St Peter and St Paul
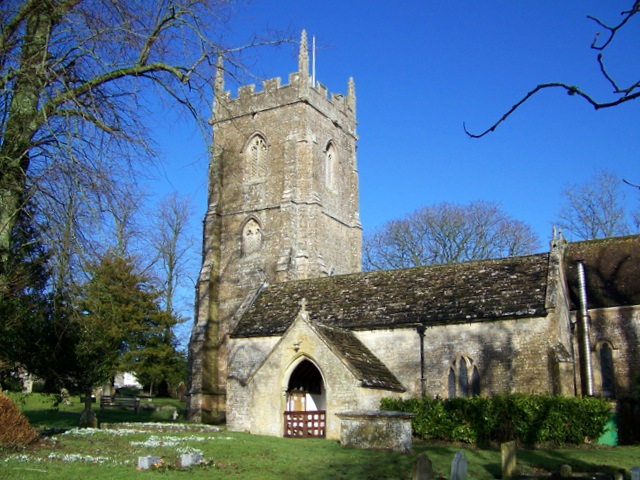

- Location within Somerset
- 51.0061°N 2.4785°W
- Location: Charlton Horethorne, Somerset, England

History
- Built: 12th century

Listed Building – Grade II*
- Official name: Church of St Peter and St Paul
- Designated: 24 March 1961
- Reference no.: 1056366

The Anglican Church of St Peter and St Paul in Charlton Horethorne, Somerset, England was built in the 12th century. It is a Grade II* listed building.

== History ==
The church was built in the 12th century but has been changed in subsequent years, including a Victorian restoration in the 19th century. The 19th century restoration included the installation of the organ and erection of a lych gate in the churchyard.

The parish is part of the benefice of Milborne Port and Charlton Horethorne with Goathill, Milborne Wick and Stowell within the Diocese of Bath and Wells.

== Architecture ==
The stone building has stone slate roofs. It consists of a three-bay nave and two-bay chancel with north and south aisles and a south porch. The two-stage west tower is supported by corner buttresses. The tower has a peal of eight bells the oldest of which were cast around 1350.

Much of the interior fittings are from the 18th and 19th centuries but it does include some fragments of stained glass from around 1450. A 4th century Romano-British altar was found in the churchyard and is now in the church.

== See also ==
- List of ecclesiastical parishes in the Diocese of Bath and Wells
