= Milborne Wick Mission Church =

Church in Somerset, England

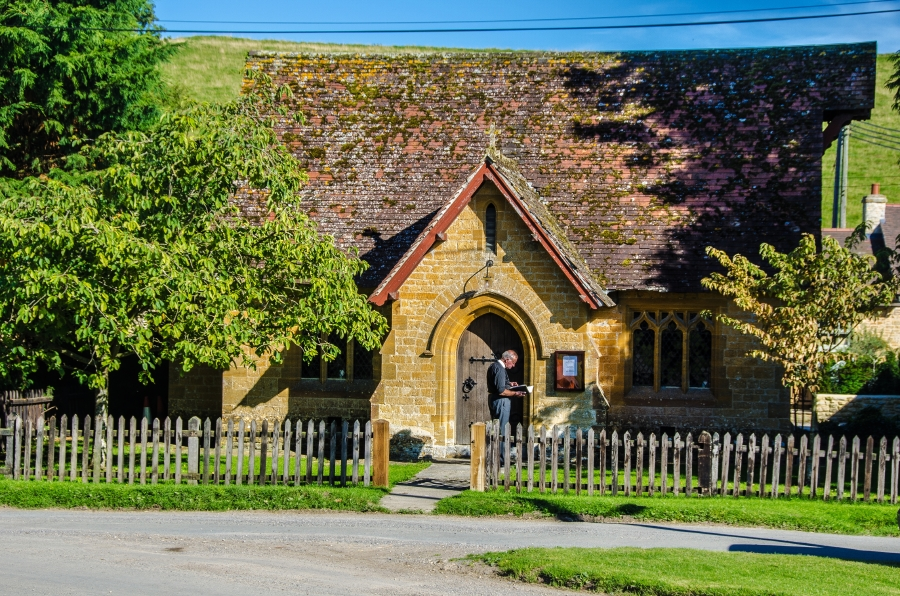

Religion
- Affiliation: Church of England
- Ecclesiastical or organizational status: Active

Location
- Location: Milborne Wick, Somerset, England
- Interactive map of Milborne Wick Mission Church
- Coordinates: 50.9849°N 2.4730°W

Architecture
- Architect: Henry Hall
- Type: Church
- Style: Perpendicular style
- Completed: 1891

Milborne Wick Mission Church is a Church of England church in Milborne Wick, Somerset, England. The church was built in 1891 and is a Grade II listed building. It now holds two services a month and has accommodation for 30 people.

== History ==
Milborne Wick's mission church was built as a chapel of ease to the parish church of St John the Evangelist at Milborne Port. The rector of the parish, Rev. W. J. Birkbeck, led the scheme for the church's construction. A major benefactor was Sir Edward Bradford Medlycott, who gave a 99-year lease for the land, donated a sum of money and also granted building stone from his quarries.

Plans for the church were drawn up by Mr. Henry Hall of London and it was built by Mr. A. Hallett of Milborne Port with Mr. Alfred Reynolds as clerk of the works. The cost of the church amounted to almost £400, which discounting the donation of building material and furnishings, was raised by public subscription. Grants were also received from the Bath and Wells Diocesan Society (£25) and the Incorporated Church Building Society (£15).

The church was opened by Sir Medlycott on 21 October 1891 and the dedication carried out by Rev. Canon Bernard on behalf of the Bishop of Bath and Wells, who was unable to attend owing to illness. By the time of its opening, £215 of the £400 cost had been received or promised.

A credence table of polished marble and stone was installed at the church in 1892 by Mr. Reynolds in memory of his wife. The table was designed by Mr. Hall and made by Messrs. Harry Hems & Sons of Exeter. It was dedicated and first used on 4 September 1892.

== Architecture ==
The church is built of cut and squared Hamstone, with ashlar dressings and a clay tile roof. There is a small chancel at the east end and a north porch. The open timbered roof has principals of pitch pine and red deal. Many of the 1891 fittings were gifted by local residents, including the west window by Mr. Hyde, a bell by Mr. Smith and the altar desk by Lady Medlycott.
