= Charlton Horethorne =

Village and civil parish in Somerset, England

Coordinates: 51.0098°N 2.4788°W

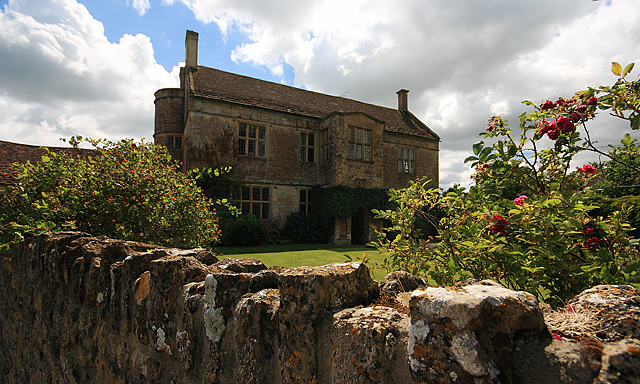
- Manor Farm House

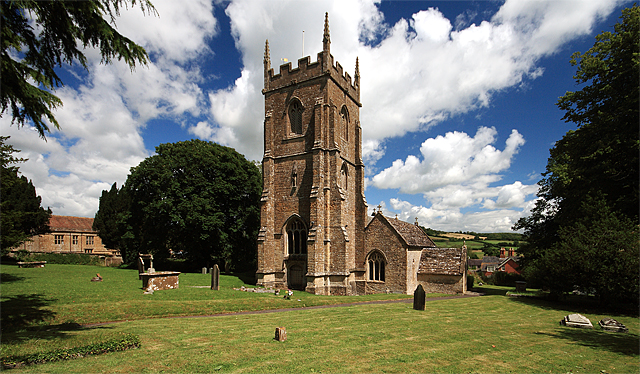
- Parish Church of St Peter and St Paul

- Location within Somerset
- Population: 591 (2011)
- OS grid reference: ST665235
- Civil parish: Charlton Horethorne
- Unitary authority: Somerset
- Ceremonial county: Somerset
- Region: South West
- Country: England
- Sovereign state: United Kingdom
- Post town: SHERBORNE
- Postcode district: DT9
- Dialling code: 01963
- Police: Avon and Somerset
- Fire: Devon and Somerset
- Ambulance: South Western
- UK Parliament: Glastonbury and Somerton
- Website: Charlton Horethorne Parish Council

Charlton Horethorne is a village and civil parish in Somerset, England, situated 5 miles (8 km) south-west of Wincanton and 5 miles (8 km) north-east of Sherborne in the neighbouring county of Dorset. The village has a population of 591. The parish also includes Stowell.

The village lies on the Monarch's Way long-distance footpath that approximates the escape route taken by King Charles II in 1651 after being defeated in the Battle of Worcester.

Charlton Horethorne in the 21st century is a village with successful businesses, a primary school and a village hall that was purchased in 1923 from the Army as a memorial to the fallen in the First World War. Despite its age and the fact that it was previously used as a wooden mess hall, it is used on a frequent and regular basis by a wide range of groups and activities.

The village benefits from the presence of The Village Shop and a pub called The Kings Arms that offers food and accommodation.

== History ==
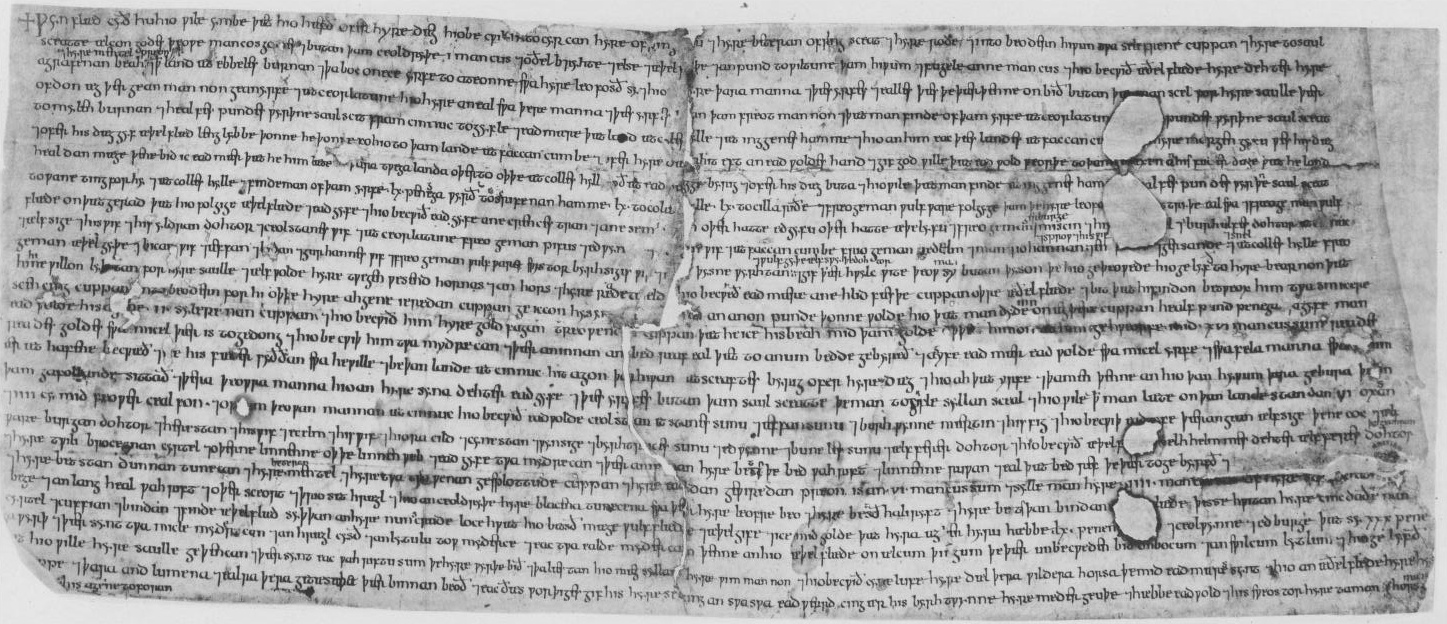
Will of Wynflæd, circa AD 950, mentions land at Ceorlatune (11th-century copy, British Library Cotton Charters viii. 38)

The village was originally known just as Charlton, meaning "the farmers settlement" and then known as Charlton Kanville by 1225. In 1084 Horethorn was added coming from "Hareturna" meaning "grey thornbush". The parish was part of the hundred of Horethorne.

Evidence of early human occupation of the parish is provided by three Bronze-Age barrows and a possible Iron-Age camp on the escarpment near Sigwells, an area to the west of the village where Mesolithic and Romano-British material has also been found. Around 950 the manor belonged to Wynflaed (d. c. 950), and may have passed to her daughter Aethelflaed. It was held by Vitel in 1066 and, by the time of the Domesday Book in 1086, by Robert son of Gerold (d. 1102), who paid an annual rent of 100 cheeses. In 1439 it was bought by Henry Beaufort, Bishop of Winchester, who gave the manor to the Hospital of St Cross, Winchester in 1445.

The Manor Farm House in Horse Lane was built as the local manor house in 1608.

RNAS Charlton Horethorne (HMS Heron II) was a Royal Naval Air Service station in nearby Sigwells. It opened in 1942 as a flying training base under the administrative care of HMS Heron. It closed in 1948 and has since been returned to agricultural use.

== Governance ==
The parish council has responsibility for local issues, including setting an annual precept (local rate) to cover the council's operating costs and producing annual accounts for public scrutiny. The parish council evaluates local planning applications and works with the local police, district council officers, and neighbourhood watch groups on matters of crime, security, and traffic. The parish council's role also includes initiating projects for the maintenance and repair of parish facilities, as well as consulting with the district council on the maintenance, repair, and improvement of highways, drainage, footpaths, public transport, and street cleaning. Conservation matters (including trees and listed buildings) and environmental issues are also the responsibility of the council.

For local government purposes, since 1 April 2023, the parish comes under the unitary authority of Somerset Council. Prior to this, it was part of the non-metropolitan district of South Somerset (established under the Local Government Act 1972). It was part of Wincanton Rural District before 1974.

It is also part of the Glastonbury and Somerton county constituency represented in the House of Commons of the Parliament of the United Kingdom. It elects one Member of Parliament (MP) by the first past the post system of election.

== Religious sites ==
The 12th-century Church of St Peter and St Paul, Charlton Horethorne acquired its two-stage tower in the late 15th century. It has offset corner buttresses almost to the full height of the tower with small crowning pinnacles. A Romano-British altar was discovered in the churchyard.

Stowell's Church of St Mary Magdalene is Grade II listed. VC holder Eric Charles Twelves Wilson (1912 – 2008) is buried in the churchyard; he wrote a booklet "Stowell in the Blackmore Vale".

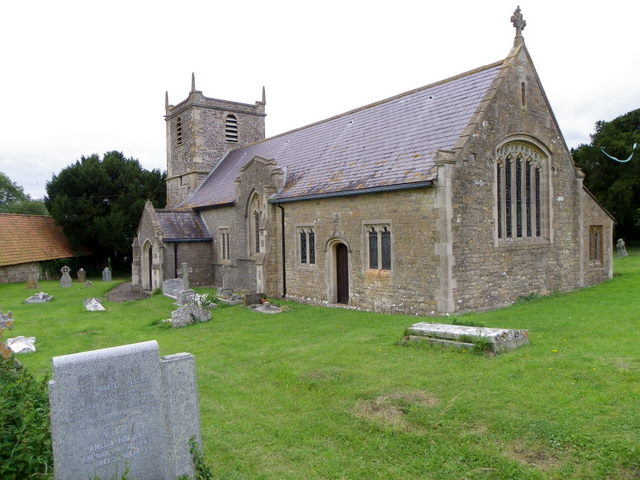
The Church of St Mary Magdalene, Stowell

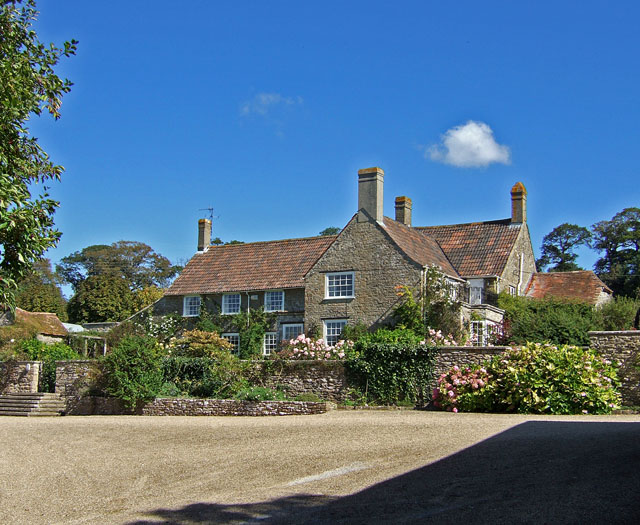
Quarrey House

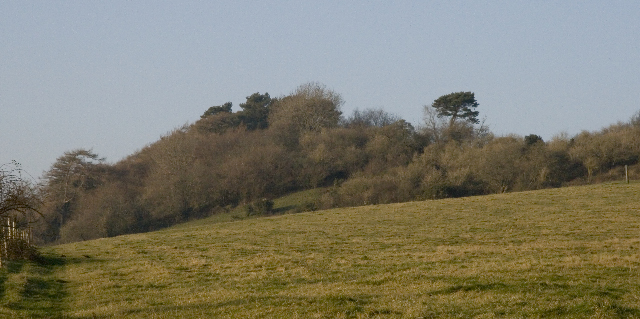
Charlton Gorse
