= Church of St John the Baptist, North Cheriton =

Church in Somerset, England

Church of St John the Baptist
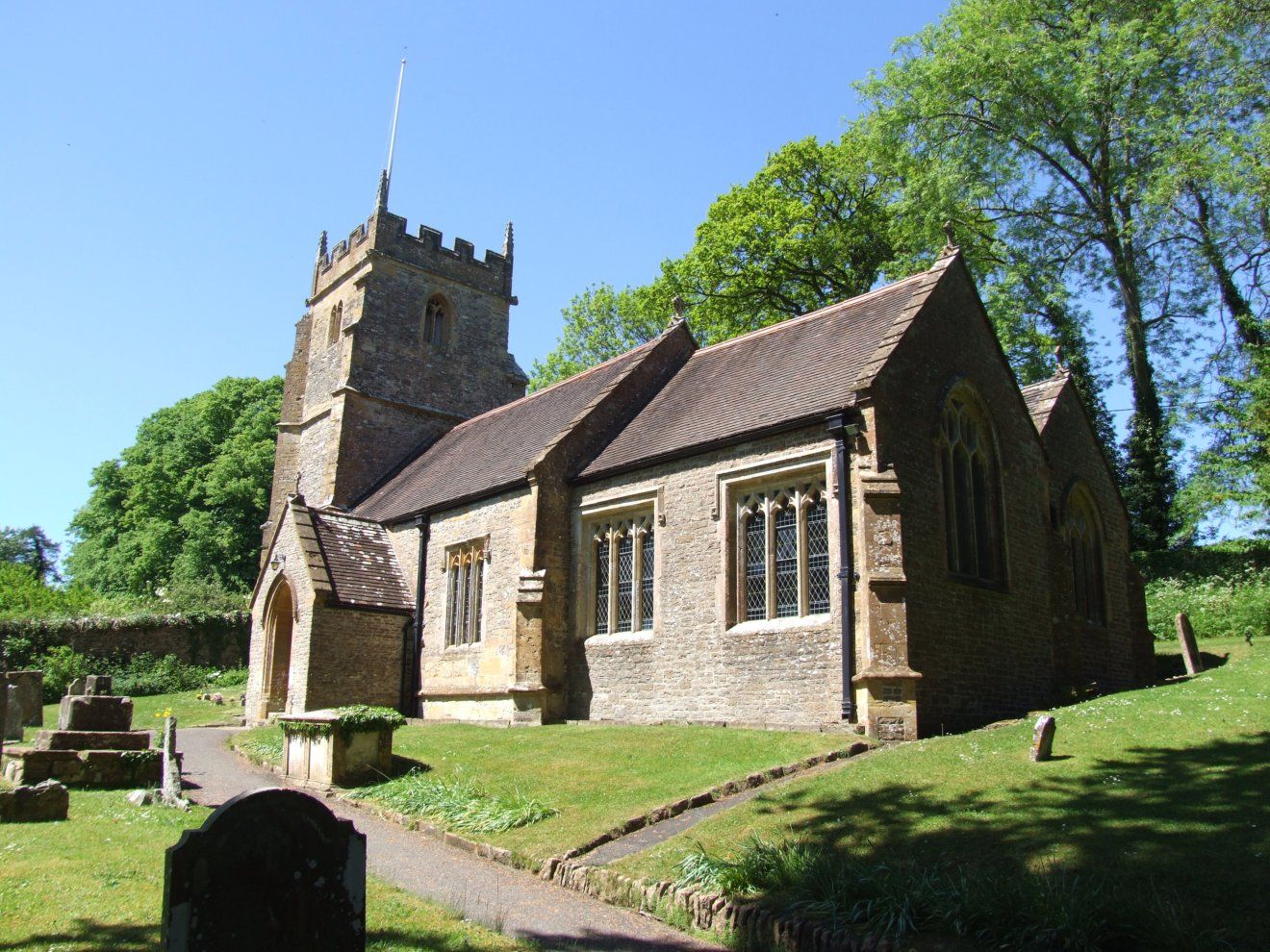

- Location within Somerset
- 51.0309°N 2.4474°W
- Location: North Cheriton, Somerset, England

History
- Built: 14th century

Listed Building – Grade II*
- Official name: Church of St John the Baptist
- Designated: 24 March 1961
- Reference no.: 1274277

The Anglican Church of St John the Baptist in North Cheriton, Somerset, England was built in the 14th century. It is a Grade II* listed building.

== History ==
The church was built in the 14th century. In the 19th it underwent Victorian restoration which included rebuilding much of the fabric of the building.

The parish is part of the Camelot Churches benefice within the Diocese of Bath and Wells.

== Architecture ==
The stone building has hamstone dressings and clay tile roofs. It consists of a three-bay nave and two-bay chancel with a north aisle with attached organ chamber and vestry and a south porch. The two-stage tower is supported by corner buttresses and has survived from the 15th century. The tower has a peal of five bells.

The interior is largely from the 19th century but it does contain part of a screen from around 1500 which has been imported from the Church of St John the Baptist in Pilton. The font may be from the 12th century. The pulpit is from 1633. Some of the stained glass is by Clayton and Bell.

== See also ==
- List of ecclesiastical parishes in the Diocese of Bath and Wells
