= Milborne Port Town Hall =

Municipal building in Milborne Port, Somerset, England

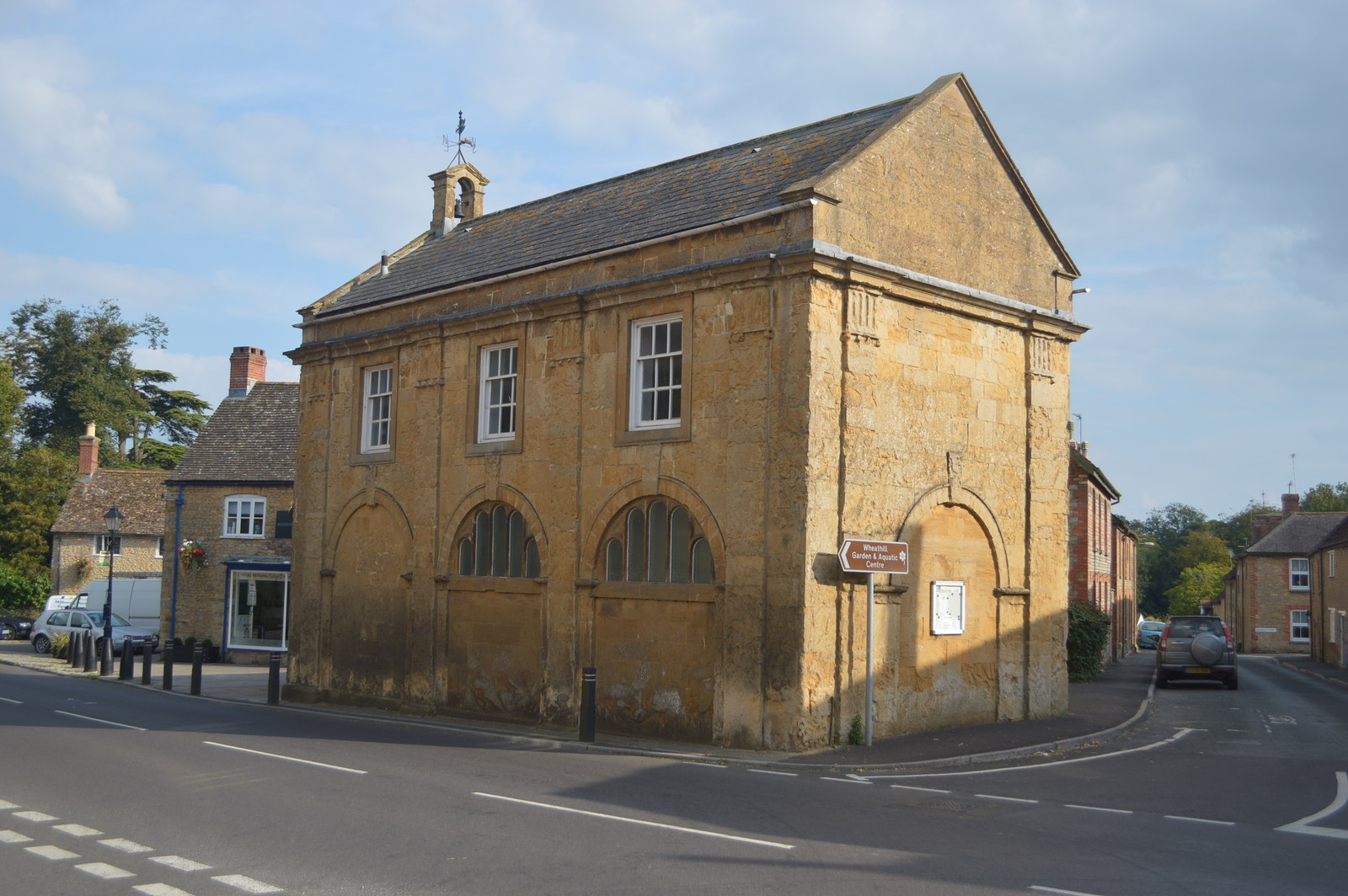
- Milborne Port Town Hall

- Shown in Somerset
- 50.9662°N 2.4605°W
- Location: High Street, Milborne Port

History
- Built: 1720

Site notes
- Architectural style: Neoclassical style

Listed Building – Grade II
- Official name: Town Hall
- Designated: 24 March 1961
- Reference no.: 1174867

Milborne Port Town Hall is a municipal building in the High Street in Milborne Port, Somerset, England. The structure, which serves as meeting place of Milborne Port Parish Council, is a Grade II listed building.

== History ==
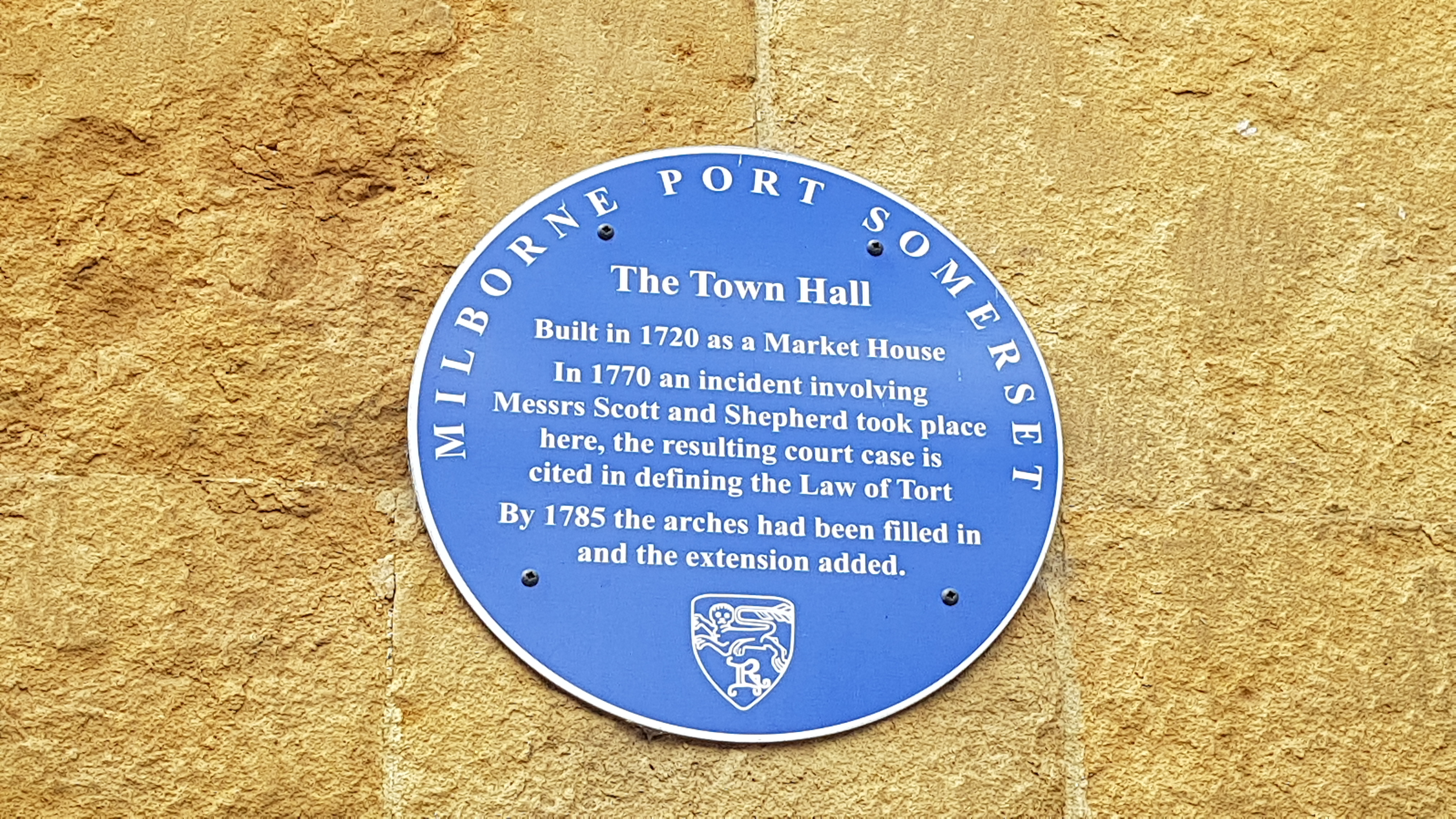
Blue plaque on the east end of the building

The building was probably commissioned by the then lord of the manor and member of parliament, Sir Thomas Travell. It was designed in the neoclassical style, built in hamstone ashlar and was completed in 1720. The design involved a symmetrical main frontage of three bays facing onto the High Street. There were three round headed openings formed by Doric order pilasters, voussoirs and keystones on the ground floor and three sash windows with architraves on the first floor. The bays were flanked by full-height pilasters surmounted by triglyphs and guttae, and at roof level, there was a cornice and a hipped roof, with a bellcote at the east end. Internally, the principal rooms were the main hall on the ground floor and the assembly room on the first floor.

In 1770, the town hall was the venue for events involving an exploding squib which resulted in a landmark case, known formally as Scott v Shepherd and informally as the flying squib case, which helped establish the principles of remoteness, foreseeability, and intervening cause in modern common law torts (personal injury law).

Milborne Port had a very small electorate and a dominant patron, Henry Paget, 1st Marquess of Anglesey, which meant it was recognised by the UK Parliament as a rotten borough. There was also evidence of gerrymandering by both parties in the preceding elections. Its right to elect members of parliament was removed by the Reform Act 1832.

After the volume of agricultural goods traded in the market reduced, the arches were filled in and the building was extended to the south in around 1785. It had become a warehouse by 1791, and it served as a National Charity School in the first half of the 19th century.

Sir William Coles Medlycott, 1st Baronet of Ven House took ownership of the town hall when he became the new lord of the manor in 1835. Then, in the 1880s, Sir William Coles Paget Medlycott, 3rd Baronet decided to use it as the venue for a museum of natural history artefacts that he had collected. By the start of the First World War, the building was being used as a drill hall by a company of the 4th Battalion of the Dorset Regiment.

Sir James Christopher Medlycott, 8th Baronet sold the building to Milborne Port Parish Council in 1949, and the assembly room then became the regular meeting place of the parish council. The town hall clock, which had stopped working, was fully refurbished in 2021.
