= Castleton, Dorset =

Village in Dorset, England

Coordinates: 50.950°N 2.483°W

Castleton
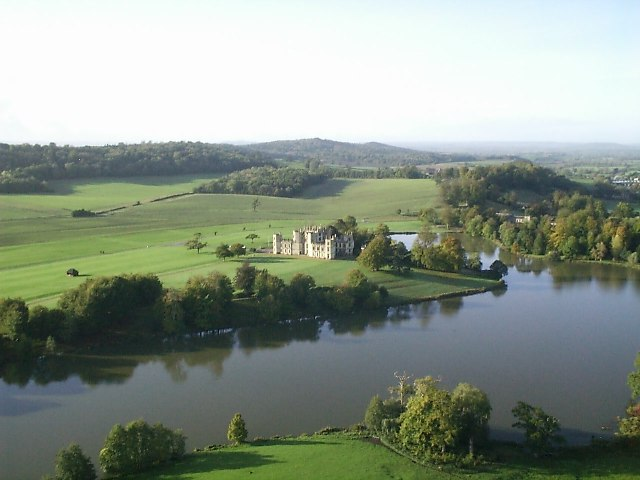
- Sherborne Castle and Lake. Most of the land in view lies within Castleton parish.

- Location within Dorset
- Population: 155
- OS grid reference: ST648168
- Civil parish: Castleton
- Unitary authority: Dorset
- Ceremonial county: Dorset
- Region: South West
- Country: England
- Sovereign state: United Kingdom
- Post town: Sherborne
- Postcode district: DT9
- Police: Dorset
- Fire: Dorset and Wiltshire
- Ambulance: South Western
- UK Parliament: West Dorset

Castleton is a civil parish in the English county of Dorset. The parish virtually encircles the town of Sherborne, and contains within its boundary both Sherborne Castle and Sherborne Old Castle. These and other buildings within the parish are today generally regarded as comprising part of Sherborne. The parish includes the hamlets of Wyke, Silverlake, Over Coombe, Higher Clatcombe, Dodds Cross, and Pinford. In the 2011 census the parish had a population of 155.

Roman remains have been found at two sites in the parish: at Pinford Lane, in the east, and near Sandford Lane, in the north. The Pinford Lane site revealed the remains of buildings, an oven or kiln, coins, pottery, brooches and beads. The Sandford Lane site revealed more remains of buildings, coins and one brooch.

Most of the houses in the parish, but not the church, were pulled down when the railway was built through the town. Castleton shares a grouped parish council, Yeohead & Castleton Parish Council, with the three village parishes of Poyntington, Goathill and Oborne.

The parish is currently in the Dorset County division of Sherborne Rural, and the Parliament constituency of West Dorset.
