= Laycock Railway Cutting =

Railway cutting in Somerset, England

- Site of Special Scientific Interest
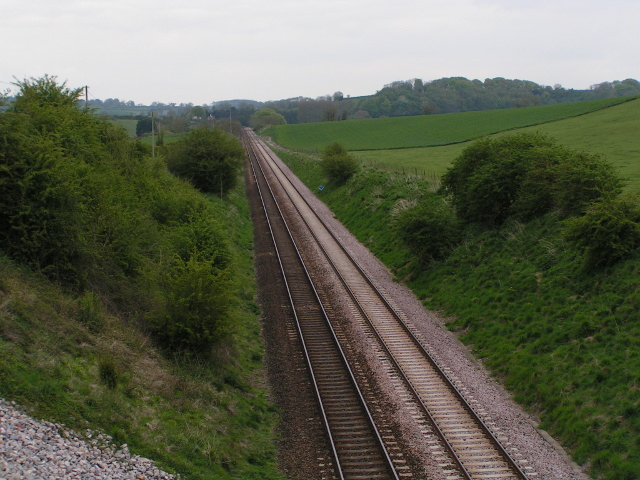

- Location within Somerset
- Location of Laycock Railway Cutting.
- Area of search: Somerset
- Grid reference: ST678213
- Coordinates: 50.9901°N 2.4601°W
- Interest: Geological
- Area: 1.3 hectares (0.013 km^{2}; 0.0050 sq mi)
- Notification date: 1993

Laycock Railway Cutting (grid reference ST678213) is a 1.3 hectare geological Site of Special Scientific Interest near Milborne Port in Somerset, notified in 1993. It is a Geological Conservation Review site. All of the land designated as Laycock Railway Cutting SSSI is owned by Network Rail.

Laycock Railway Cutting is the best single exposure of the Bathonian ’Fuller's Earth Rock’ in South Somerset. Ammonites indicating the Morrisi and Subcontractus zones of the Middle Bathonian are frequent. Ammonites are generally extremely rare at this level in Britain and their presence at Laycock is of international stratigraphic importance. The combination of features of both litho- and chrono-stratigraphical importance make Laycock Railway Cutting a key British Bathonian locality.

== Sources ==
- English Nature citation sheet for the site (accessed 10 August 2006)
