= Goathill =

Hamlet in Dorset, England

Coordinates: 50.9531°N 2.4620°W

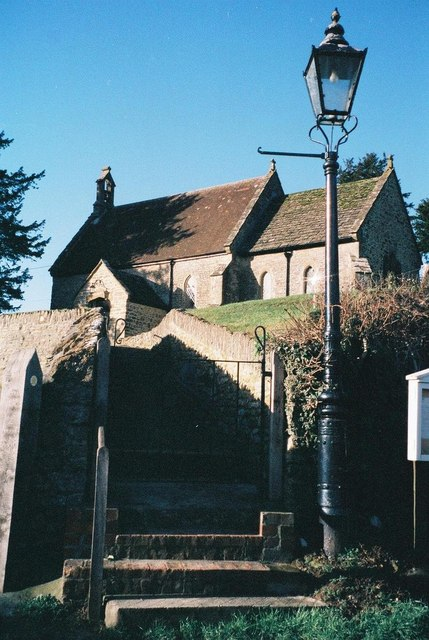
- St Peter's church, Goathill

- Location within Dorset
- Population: 10
- OS grid reference: ST 6764 1718
- Unitary authority: Dorset
- Ceremonial county: Dorset
- Region: South West
- Country: England
- Sovereign state: United Kingdom
- Post town: Sherborne
- Postcode district: DT9
- Police: Dorset
- Fire: Dorset and Wiltshire
- Ambulance: South Western
- UK Parliament: West Dorset

Goathill is a village and civil parish in the county of Dorset in England, situated in northern Dorset, a couple of miles east of the town of Sherborne. It lies very close to the county boundary however, and for much of its history (until 1896) lay instead within the neighbouring county of Somerset, and has been described as being "just in Dorset by a nanny-goat's whisker". It remains part of the diocese of Bath and Wells.

Goathill, together with the three village parishes of Poyntington, Castleton and Oborne, form a group of parishes that share a grouped parish council called Yeohead & Castleton Parish Council.

The parish was part of the hundred of Horethorne.

St Peter's church and a mill are the major buildings. Nearby is Goathill Quarry, a place of special scientific interest to geologists as it allows the Fuller's earth layers to be established in relation to the limestone. Dorset County Council estimate that in 2013 Goathill parish had a population of 10.

To the north, in Somerset, is the village of Milborne Port.
