= Hundred of Horethorne =

Historical Hundred of Somerset, England

Horethorne Hundred
- Area
- 26,370 acres (10,670 ha)
- History
  - Created: 11th century
- Status: Hundred
- Subdivisions
  - Type: Parishes
  - Units: Abbas Combe, Charlton Horethorne, North Cheriton, Corton Denham, Goathill, Henstridge, Horsington, Marston Magna, Milborne Port, Poyntington, Sandford Orcas, Stowell, Trent

The Hundred of Horethorne is one of the 40 historical Hundreds in the historic county of Somerset, England, dating from before the Norman conquest during the Anglo-Saxon era although exact dates are unknown. Each hundred had a 'fyrd', which acted as the local defence force and a court which was responsible for the maintenance of the frankpledge system. They also formed a unit for the collection of taxes. The role of the hundred court was described in the Dooms (laws) of King Edgar. The name of the hundred was normally that of its meeting-place.

During the 11th century the hundred was sometimes known Milborne hundred, although by the 13th century it was known as Horethorne or la Horethorn.

It consisted of the ancient parishes of: Abbas Combe, Charlton Horethorne, North Cheriton, Corton Denham, Goathill, Henstridge, Horsington, Marston Magna, Milborne Port, Poyntington, Sandford Orcas, Stowell, and Trent. It covered an area of 26,370 acres (10,670 ha). Until about 1735 the hundred also included the parish of Rimpton.

The importance of the hundred courts declined from the seventeenth century. By the 19th century several different single-purpose subdivisions of counties, such as poor law unions, sanitary districts, and highway districts sprang up, filling the administrative role previously played by parishes and hundreds. Although the Hundreds have never been formally abolished, their functions ended with the establishment of county courts in 1867 and the introduction of districts by the Local Government Act 1894.
