= Scott v Shepherd =

1773 English tort law case

Scott v. Shepherd 96 Eng. Rep. 525 (K.B. 1773), commonly known as the "flying squib case", is an important English tort law case on remoteness and the principle of novus actus interveniens as it related to the division in law between trespass and "action on the case".

== Facts ==
Shepherd tossed an explosive squib into a crowded market in the Market House in the town of Milborne Port in Somerset, where it landed on the table of a gingerbread merchant named Yates. Willis, a bystander, grabbed the squib and threw it across the market to protect himself and Yates. Unfortunately, the squib landed in the goods of another merchant named Ryal. Ryal immediately grabbed the squib and tossed it away, accidentally hitting Scott in the face just as the squib exploded. The explosion put out one of Scott's eyes.

== Judgment ==
The majority held Shepherd was fully liable, because, said De Gray CJ, "I do not consider [the intermediaries] as free agents in the present case, but acting under a compulsive necessity for their own safety and self-preservation."

Nares J wrote the following.

I am of opinion that trespass would well lie in the present case. The natural and probable consequence of the act done by the defendant was injury to somebody, and, therefore, the act was illegal at common law. The throwing of squibs has... been since made a nuisance. Being, therefore, unlawful, the defendant was liable to answer for the consequences, be the injury mediate or immediate. YEAR BOOK 21 Hen 7... is express that malus animus is not necessary to constitute a trespass... The principle I go on is what is laid down in Reynolds v. Clark... that if the act in the first instance be unlawful, trespass will lie. Wherever, therefore, an act is unlawful at first, trespass will lie for the consequences of it. So, in YEAR BOOK 12 Hen 4... trespass lay for stopping a sewer with earth so as to overflow the plaintiff's land. In YEAR BOOK 26 Hen 8... for going on the plaintiff's land to take the boughs off which had fallen thereon in lopping... I do not think it necessary, to maintain trespass, that the defendant should personally touch the plaintiff; if he does it by a mean it is sufficient... He is the person who, in the present case, gave the mischievous faculty to the squib. That mischievous faculty remained in it until the explosion. No new power of doing mischief was communicated to it by Willis or Ryal. It is like the case of a mad ox turned loose in a crowd. The person who turns him loose is answerable in trespass for whatever mischief he may do. The intermediate acts of Willis and Ryal will not purge the original tort in the defendant. But he who does the first wrong is answerable for all the consequential damages...

De Grey CJ's judgment was as follows.

This case is one of those wherein the line drawn by the law between actions on the case and actions of trespass is very nice and delicate. Trespass is an injury accompanied with force, for which an action of trespass vi et armis lies against the person from whom it is received. The question here is whether the injury received by the plaintiff arises from the force of the original act of the defendant, or from a new force by a third person. I agree with JUDGE BLACKSTONE as to the principles he has laid down but not in his application of those principles to the present case. The real question certainly does not turn on the lawfulness or unlawfulness of the original act; for actions of trespass will lie for legal acts when they become trespasses by accident, as in the cases cited of cutting thorns, lopping of a tree, shooting at a mark, defending oneself by a stick which strikes another behind, etc. They may also not lie for the consequences even of illegal acts, as that of casting a log in the highway, etc. But the true question is whether the injury is the direct and immediate act of the defendant; and I am of opinion that in this case it is. The throwing the squib was an act unlawful and tending to affright the bystanders. So far, mischief was originally intended; not any particular mischief, but mischief indiscriminate and wanton. Whatever mischief, therefore, follows he is the author of it; egreditur personam, as the phrase is in criminal cases. And though criminal cases are no rule for civil ones, yet in trespass I think that there is an analogy. Everyone who does an unlawful act is considered as the doer of all that follows; if done with a deliberate intent, the consequence may amount to murder; if incautiously, to manslaughter. . . . So, too, in 1 VENT 295 . . . a person breaking a horse in Lincoln's Inn Fields hurt a man; held, that trespass lay: and, 2 LEV 172 . . . that it need not be laid scienter. I look on all that was done subsequent to the original throwing as a continuation of the first force and first act which will continue until the squib was spent by bursting. I think that any innocent person removing the danger from himself to another is justifiable; the blame lights on the first thrower. The new direction and new force flow out of the first force, and are not a new trespass. The writ in the REGISTER . . . for trespass in maliciously cutting down a head of water which thereupon flowed down to and overwhelmed another's pond shows that the immediate act need not be instantaneous, but that a chain of effects connected together will be sufficient. It has been urged that the intervention of a free agent will make a difference; but I do not consider Willis and Ryal as free agents in the present case, but acting under a compulsive necessity for their own safety and self-preservation. On these reasons I concur with JUDGES GOULD and NARES, that the present action is maintainable.

== Dissent ==
Blackstone J argued, reflecting the arcane distinctions between trespass on the case and vi et armis, that there was no liability for indirect consequences.

I am of opinion that an action of trespass does not lie for the plaintiff against the defendant on this Case. I take the settled distinction to be that, where the injury is immediate, an action of trespass will lie; where it is only consequential, it must be an action on the Case. . . . The lawfulness or unlawfulness of the original act is not the criterion, although something of that sort is put into LORD RAYMOND'S mouth in Reynolds v. Clark . . ., where it can only mean that if the act then in question, of erecting a spout, had been in itself unlawful, trespass might have lain; but as it was a lawful act (on the defendant's own ground) and the injury to the plaintiff only consequential, it must be an action on the case. But this cannot be the general rule, for it is held by the court in the same case that if I throw a log of timber into the highway (which is an unlawful act) and another man tumbles over it and is hurt, an action on the case only lies, it being a consequential damage; but if in throwing it I hit another man, he may bring trespass because it is an immediate wrong. Trespass may sometimes lie for the consequences of a lawful act. If in lopping my own trees a bough accidentally falls on my neighbour's ground and I go thereon to fetch it, trespass lies. . . . But then the entry is of itself an immediate wrong. And case will sometimes lie for the consequence of an unlawful act. If by false imprisonment I have a special damage, as if I forfeit my recognisance thereby, I shall have an action on the case per JUDGE POWELL in Bourden v. Alloway. . . . Yet here the original act was unlawful, and in the nature of trespass. So that lawful or unlawful is quite out of the case.

The solid distinction is between direct or immediate injuries on the one hand and mediate or consequential on the other, and trespass never lay for the latter. If this be so, the only question will be whether the injury which the plaintiff suffered was immediate, or consequential only; and I hold it to be the latter. The original act was, as against Yates, a trespass; not as against Ryal or the plaintiff. The tortious act was complete when the squib lay at rest on Yates's stall. He, or any bystander, had, I allow, a right to protect themselves by removing the squib, but should have taken care to do it in such a manner as not to endanger others. But the defendant, I think, is not answerable in an action of trespass and assault for the mischief done by the squib in the new motion impressed on it, and the new direction given it, by either Willis or Ryal, who both were free agents and acted on their own judgment. This distinguishes it from the cases put of turning loose a wild beast or a madman. They are only instruments in the hand of the first agent. Nor is it like diverting the course of an enraged ox, or of a stone thrown, or an arrow glancing against a tree; because there the original motion, the vis impressa, is continued, though diverted. Here the instrument of mischief was at rest until a new impetus and a new direction are given it, not once only, but by two successive rational agents. But it is said that the act is not complete, nor the squib at rest, until after it is spent or exploded. It certainly has a power of doing fresh mischief, and so has a stone that has been thrown against my windows and now lies still. Yet if any person gives that stone a new motion and does further mischief with it, trespass will not lie for that against the original thrower. No doubt but Yates may maintain trespass against the defendant. And, according to the doctrine contended for, so may Ryal and the plaintiff. Three actions for one single act! nay, it may be extended in infinitum. If a man tosses a football into the street and, after being kicked about by one hundred people, it at last breaks a tradesman's windows, shall he have trespass against the man who first produced it? Surely only against the man who gave it that mischievous direction. But it is said, if the plaintiff has no action against the defendant, against whom must he seek his remedy? I give no opinion whether case would lie against the defendant for the consequential damage; though, as at present advised, I think that on the circumstances, it would. But I think that, in strictness of law, trespass would lie against Ryal, the immediate actor in this unhappy business. Both he and Willis have exceeded the bounds of self-defence and not used sufficient circumspection in removing the danger from themselves. The throwing it across the market-house instead of brushing it down, or throwing it out of the open sides into the street (if it was not meant to continue the sport, as it is called) was at least an unnecessary and incautious act. Not even menaces from others are sufficient to justify a trespass against a third person, much less a fear of danger to either his goods or his person; nothing but inevitable necessity. . . . So in the case put by JUDGE BRIAN, and assented to by JUDGE LITTLETON, and CHIEF JUDGE CHOKE, and relied on in Bessey v. Olliot and Lambert. . . :

"If a man assaults me, so that I cannot avoid him, and I lift up my staff to defend myself, and, in lifting it up, undesignedly hit another who is behind me, an action lies by that person against me; and yet I did a lawful act in endeavouring to defend myself."

But none of these great lawyers ever thought that trespass would lie by the person struck against him who first assaulted the striker. The cases cited from the REGISTER and HARDRES are all of immediate acts, or the direct and inevitable effects of the defendant's immediate acts. And I admit that the defendant is answerable in trespass for all the direct and inevitable effects caused by his own immediate act.

But what is his own immediate act? The throwing the squib to Yates's stall. Had Yates's goods been burnt or his person injured, the defendant must have been responsible in trespass. But he is not responsible for the acts of other men. The subsequent throwing across the market-house by Willis is neither the act of the defendant nor the inevitable effect of it; much less the subsequent throwing by Ryal. . . . The same evidence that will maintain trespass may also frequently maintain case, but not a converse. Every action of trespass with a "per quod" includes an action on the case. I may bring trespass for the immediate injury and subjoin a "per quod" for the consequential damages; or may bring case for the consequential damages and pass over the immediate injury, as in Bourdon v. Alloway before cited. But if I bring trespass for an immediate injury and prove at most only a consequential damage, judgment must be for the defendant: Gates v. Bayley. It is said by LORD RAYMOND, and very justly, in Reynolds v. Clark:

"We must keep up the boundaries of actions, otherwise we shall introduce the utmost confusion."

As I, therefore, think no immediate injury passed from the defendant to the plaintiff (and without such immediate injury no action of trespass can be maintained) I am of opinion that in this action judgment ought to be for the defendant.

== See also ==
- English tort law
