= Miller's Hill, Milborne Wick =

Site of Special Scientific Interest in Somerset, England

- Site of Special Scientific Interest
- Location within Somerset
- Location of Miller's Hill, Milborne Wick.
- Area of search: Somerset
- Grid reference: ST66312057
- Coordinates: 50.98354°N 2.48131°W
- Interest: Geological
- Area: 0.6 hectares (0.0060 km^{2}; 0.0023 sq mi)
- Notification date: 1985

Miller's Hill, Milborne Wick (grid reference ST66312057) is a 0.6-hectare (1.5-acre) geological Site of Special Scientific Interest at Milborne Wick in Somerset, notified in 1985.

Miller's Hill is an important and historically famous locality for studies of Middle Jurassic (Bajocian) stratigraphy and palaeontology.
