= North Cheriton =

Village and civil parish in Somerset, England

Coordinates: 51.028401°N 2.438714°W

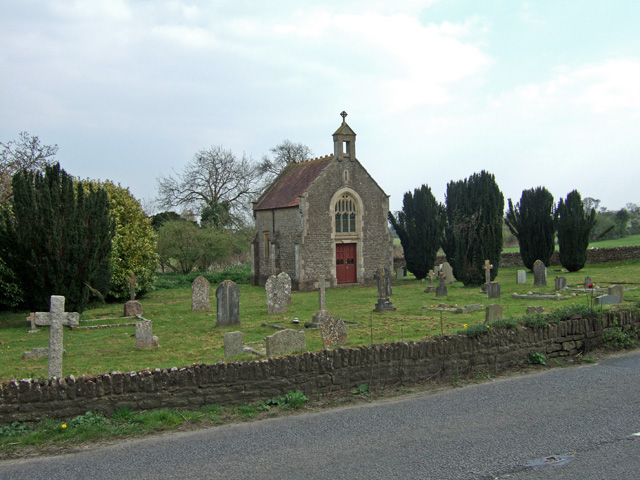
- North Cheriton Chapel

- Location within Somerset
- Population: 208 (2011)
- OS grid reference: ST693255
- Unitary authority: Somerset Council
- Ceremonial county: Somerset
- Region: South West
- Country: England
- Sovereign state: United Kingdom
- Post town: TEMPLECOMBE
- Postcode district: BA8
- Dialling code: 01963
- Police: Avon and Somerset
- Fire: Devon and Somerset
- Ambulance: South Western
- UK Parliament: Glastonbury and Somerton

North Cheriton is a small village and civil parish in Somerset, England, with a population of 208. It is located on the A357 south-west of Wincanton.

== History ==
North Cheriton is mentioned as a manor belonging to William de Moyon in the Domesday Book in 1086.

The parish was part of the hundred of Horethorne.

== Church ==
The Grade II* Listed Parish Church is dedicated to St John the Baptist, and is one of the "Camelot Parishes" in the Diocese of Bath and Wells. Interred in the Churchyard are the ashes of Betty Clay (16 April 1917 – 24 April 2004) and her husband Gervas (16 April 1907 – 18 April 2009).

== Governance ==
The parish council has responsibility for local issues, including setting an annual precept (local rate) to cover the council's operating costs and producing annual accounts for public scrutiny. The parish council evaluates local planning applications and works with the local police, district council officers, and neighbourhood watch groups on matters of crime, security, and traffic. The parish council's role also includes initiating projects for the maintenance and repair of parish facilities, as well as consulting with the district council on the maintenance, repair, and improvement of highways, drainage, footpaths, public transport, and street cleaning. Conservation matters (including trees and listed buildings) and environmental issues are also the responsibility of the council.

For local government purposes, since 1 April 2023, the parish comes under the unitary authority of Somerset Council. Prior to this, it was part of the non-metropolitan district of South Somerset (established under the Local Government Act 1972). It was part of Wincanton Rural District before 1974.

It is also part of the Glastonbury and Somerton county constituency represented in the House of Commons of the Parliament of the United Kingdom. It elects one Member of Parliament (MP) by the first past the post system of election.
