= Poyntington =

Village and civil parish in Dorset, England

Coordinates: 50.978°N 2.4991°W

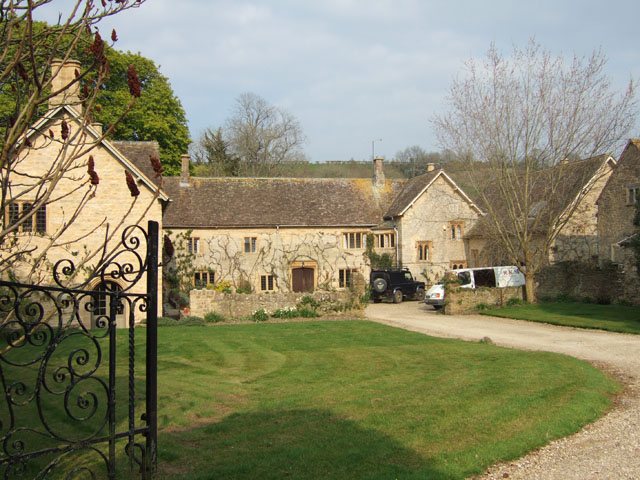
- Poyntington Manor

- Location within Dorset
- Population: 128
- OS grid reference: ST650200
- Civil parish: Yeo Head
- Unitary authority: Dorset
- Ceremonial county: Dorset
- Region: South West
- Country: England
- Sovereign state: United Kingdom
- Post town: Sherborne
- Postcode district: DT9
- Dialling code: 01963
- Police: Dorset
- Fire: Dorset and Wiltshire
- Ambulance: South Western
- UK Parliament: West Dorset

Poyntington is a village and civil parish in the county of Dorset in South West England. It lies on the edge of the Blackmore Vale about 2 miles (3.2 km) north of Sherborne. In the 2011 census the parish had a population of 128.

Poyntington shares a grouped parish council, Yeohead & Castleton Parish Council, with the three village parishes of Castleton, Goathill and Oborne. Until 1896 the village was in Somerset, part of the hundred of Horethorne.

All Saints' Church has grown from an Anglo-Saxon two-room design and contains original Norman work. Murals on pillars were discovered in 1848 but were destroyed by their exposure. Two stained-glass windows date from the fourteenth century. An unusual addition is a carving of an angel's wing which was blown off Amiens Cathedral in World War I and then donated to the church.

== Notable residents ==
- Sir Thomas Malet, Judge
- William Launcelot Scott Fleming
- Sir Ralph Cheyne (d.1400)
