= Oborne =

Village and civil parish in Dorset, England

Coordinates: 50.9651°N 2.4927°W

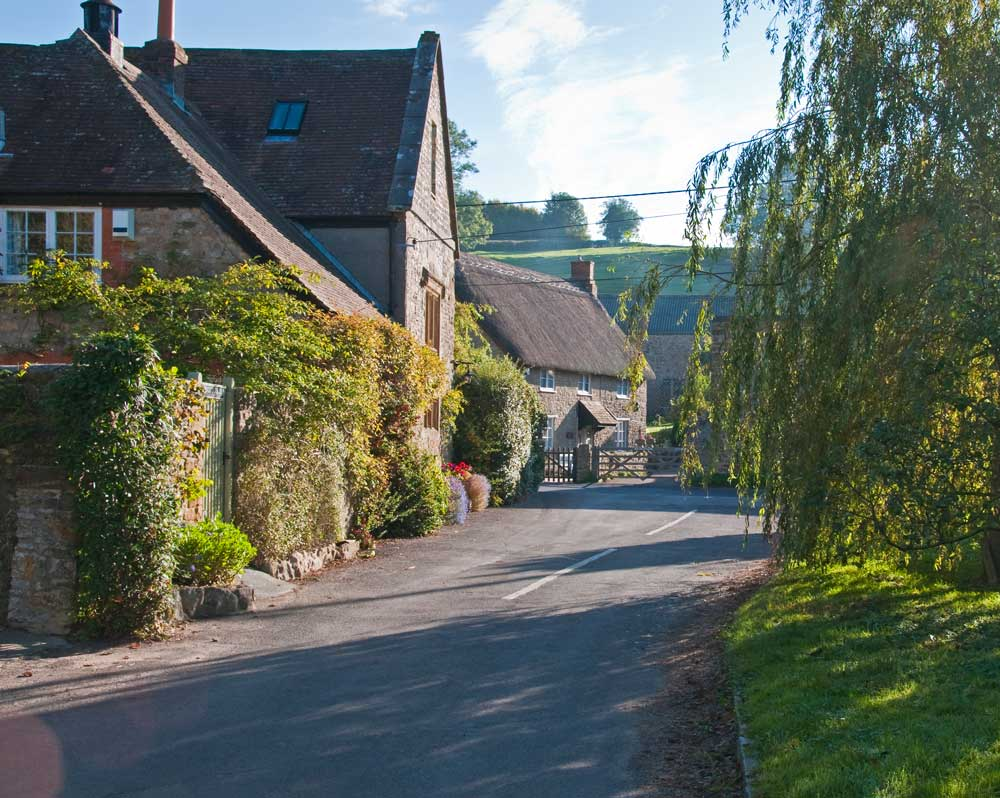
- Oborne village street

- Location within Dorset
- Population: 101
- OS grid reference: ST655185
- Unitary authority: Dorset
- Ceremonial county: Dorset
- Region: South West
- Country: England
- Sovereign state: United Kingdom
- Post town: Sherborne
- Postcode district: DT9
- Police: Dorset
- Fire: Dorset and Wiltshire
- Ambulance: South Western
- UK Parliament: West Dorset

Oborne /ˈoʊbɔːrn/ is a village and civil parish in north west Dorset, England, situated just north of the A30 road approximately 1 mile (1.6 km) northeast of Sherborne, and is close to the border with Somerset. In the 2011 census the parish had a population of 101. Oborne shares a grouped parish council, Yeohead & Castleton Parish Council, with the three village parishes of Poyntington, Goathill and Castleton.

A new parish church, designed by William Slater, was built on a fresh site in 1862. The volume on Dorset in the Buildings of England series by John Newman and Nikolaus Pevsner describe this as having "nave with bellcote, chancel and apse ... Slater's and Carpenter's typical single and twin lancets with pointed-trefoiled cusping". The remains of the Old St Cuthbert's Church are half a mile south, on the other side of the A30. Only the chancel remains. Oborne had been given to Sherborne Abbey by the Saxon King Edgar in the 10th century and it remained a 'chapel of ease' to the abbey until the Dissolution in 1539. Above the lintels of windows on the east and north sides are inscriptions entreating prayers for the good standing of Abbot John Myer (1533) and Sacristan John Dunster of Sherborne. The interior of the chancel contains a 17th-century pulpit and communion rails as well as a piscina and font from the former church at North Wootton. Nothing now remains of the medieval nave that was demolished in the 1860s. The chancel lay neglected until the 1930s, when a new incumbent began to restore it, taking advice from A. R. Powys (secretary of the Society for the Protection of Ancient Buildings) who was also responsible for the restoration of the church at Winterborne Tomson, Dorset.
