= Sandford Orcas =

Village in Dorset, England

Coordinates: 50.9851°N 2.5378°W

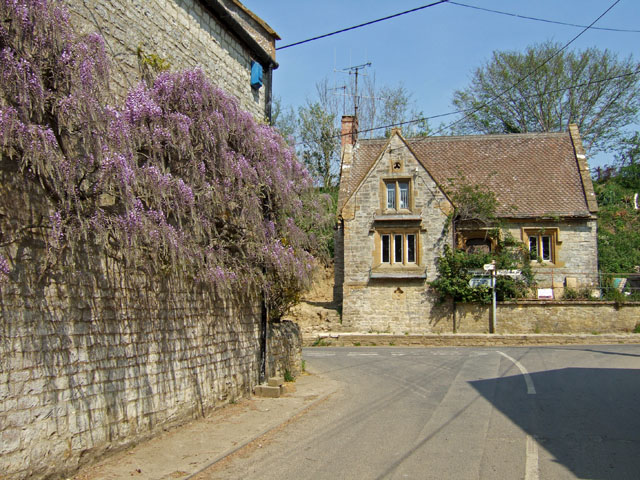
- Sandford Orcas village centre

- Location within Dorset
- Population: 180
- OS grid reference: ST623208
- Unitary authority: Dorset
- Ceremonial county: Dorset
- Region: South West
- Country: England
- Sovereign state: United Kingdom
- Post town: Sherborne
- Postcode district: DT9
- Police: Dorset
- Fire: Dorset and Wiltshire
- Ambulance: South Western
- UK Parliament: West Dorset

Sandford Orcas is a village and parish in northwest Dorset, England, 3 miles (4.8 km) north of Sherborne. In the 2011 census, the parish had a population of 180. Just to the east of the village itself is the hamlet of Holway. The village lies in hilly country on the Dorset/Somerset county border and was part of Somerset until 1896, with the land connected to the Abbot of Glastonbury.

The poetic-sounding village name has a more prosaic explanation. Three streams rise in the parish, and in Saxon times, the water was forded over a sandy riverbed from which the name Sandford derives. The 'Orcas' descends from the Norman Orescuilz family, who came to own the village manor in the century after the Battle of Hastings in 1066. The village was known as Sanford in 1086 (in the Domesday Book), Sandford in 1243, Sandford Horscoys in 1372, and Samford Orescoys in 1427. The manor house built circa 1550 during the Tudors is Grade I listed and has changed little over the centuries. The two renovations completed over the past 150 years have both been quite sympathetic.

The parish was part of the hundred of Horethorne.

Adjacent to the manor house is the Perpendicular church of Saint Nicholas, which has a 13th-century font, shaped like an upturned Canterbury bell flower. In the south chapel is a wall monument of carved and painted alabaster, showing a knight in armor kneeling between his two wives and eleven children. Seven children kneel, in black gowns, and the others are in swaddling clothes of red and lying in a heap behind their mother. The knight, who rests below the memorial, is William Knoyle. The reading on the stone gives information on this tomb dated 1607. It seems he married 'Fillip, daughter of Robert Morgane...by whom hee had yssve 4 children & bee dead'. The knight's second wife was Grace Clavel, by whom he had three sons and four daughters, who survived him.

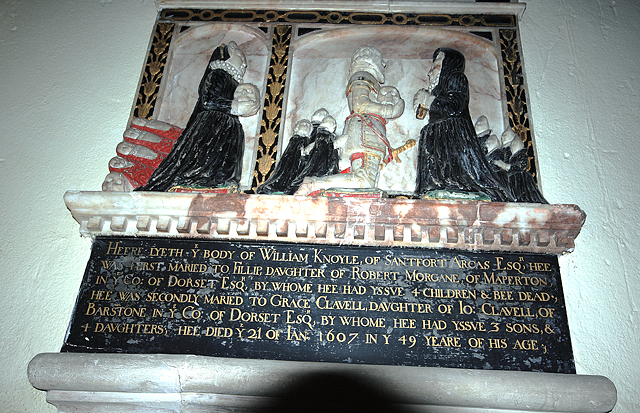
Memorial to William Knoyle in St Nicholas's Church, Sandford Orcas

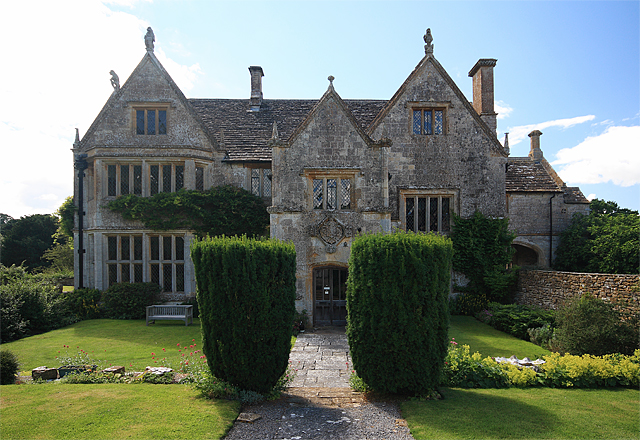
The Manor House - Sandford Orcas - geograph.org.uk - 890992
