= Goathill Quarry =

Site of Special Scientific Interest near Goathill in Dorset, England

Coordinates: 50.95589°N 2.46775°W

Goathill Quarry (grid reference ST671175) is a 0.3 hectare geological Site of Special Scientific Interest near Goathill in Dorset, England, notified in 1977.
