= Church of St John the Evangelist, Milborne Port =

Church in Somerset, England

Church of St John the Evangelist
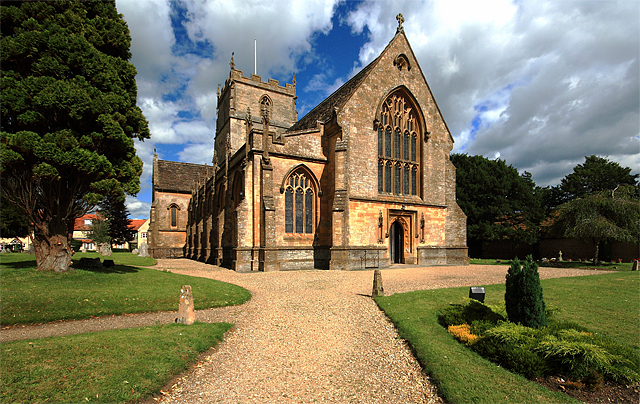

- Location within Somerset

General information
- Architectural style: Norman
- Location: Milborne Port, England
- Coordinates: 50.9653°N 2.4622°W

The Church of St John the Evangelist in Milborne Port, Somerset, England is a cruciform church of late Anglo-Saxon date and parts may well span the Norman Conquest. The church has been designated by English Heritage as a Grade I listed building.

== History ==
The chancellor Regimbald (a survivor from Edward’s reign into William’s) rebuilt his Minster at Milborne Port in “a sumptuous hybrid style.” It would seem logical to assign the now-demolished nave to this period, since the surviving south doorway of the nave was incorporated into the 1860s rebuild and is of Saxo-Norman design.

The church was part of the original endowment of Cirencester Abbey by Henry I, and held by them until the dissolution of the monasteries. An attempt was made around 1199 to make the church a prebend in Wells Cathedral however this was unsuccessful. In 1543 Winchester College acquired control and held it until 1824 when it passed to the Marquess of Anglesey and he sold his estate to Sir William Coles Medlycott in 1835. The Medlycott family memorials survive in the north transept.

From 1789 until 1825 the vicar was George Huntingford, the warden of Winchester College and bishop successively of Gloucester and Hereford, although the parish was looked after by the curate during that time.

== Architecture ==
The chapel roof has been dated at 1641. In 1712 a west gallery was built for the singers and there was also an east gallery by 1747. The west gallery was enlarged in 1812-14 and in 1826 a two-bay north aisle with a gallery was added to the nave. In 1841 the east gallery over the rood screen was taken down.

Despite the Victorian nave (almost totally rebuilt 1867–69 to the designs of Henry Hall) and accompanying north aisle, there remains the pre-conquest central tower and chancel. The south transept was heavily restored and the north chapel wall rebuilt in 1843. The north transept was rebuilt along with the nave, so compared to pre-1867 half of the Anglo-Saxon church has now gone.

The new nave is 28 feet (9 m) longer than the original it replaced. The old west front exhibited vestiges of triangular-headed arcading on either side of the inserted Perpendicular west window, and the lower part of the front was divided into compartments, by broad pilasters of plain square section. This was recorded by photography and the photo was published in 1893 by A. Reynolds.

The crossing (tower) is wider in plan than the nave, and markedly wider than the transepts or chancel. This is a distinctive Saxon trait, which may also be observed at nearby Sherborne Abbey (where traces of the Saxon rubble west wall may be seen). Inside, the four crossing arches with their jambs survive, although the east and west arches have been rebuilt in pointed 14th-century form; the south and north arches have been slightly deformed to elliptical shape due to the pressure of the masonry, perhaps by the addition of the top stage of the tower at some later date. There are eight bells in the tower, three of 1736 by Thomas Bilbie, two by A. and C. Mears of 1846, and the rest recast in the 20th century.

Further restoration of the Chancel took place in 1908 when Sir Walter Tapper included plaster medallions high on the sanctuary walls. The glass in the east window is by Bainbridge Reynolds.

The chancel exhibits pilaster strip work, much disturbed and cut by Early English period windows, and has a close parallel at Bradford-on-Avon. The wall thickness of the chancel is 2 ft 8in, which is a typical Anglo-Saxon dimension.

The church, with its Anglo-Saxon features, is of major importance to our understanding of the larger minsters in pre-conquest England.

== See also ==
- List of ecclesiastical parishes in the Diocese of Bath and Wells
