= Milborne Port =

Coordinates: 50.9666°N 2.4610°W

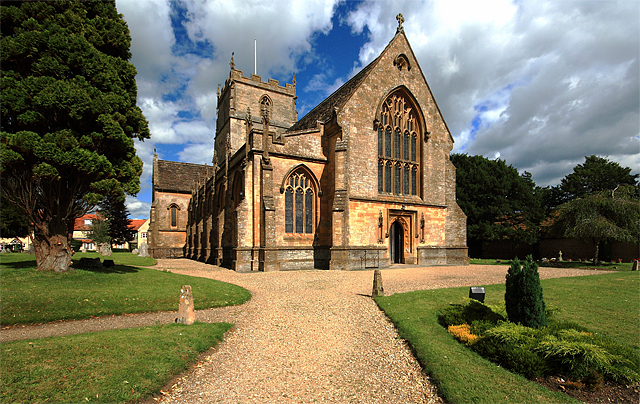
- Church of St John the Evangelist

- Location within Somerset
- Population: 2,802 (2011)
- OS grid reference: ST677186
- Unitary authority: Somerset
- Ceremonial county: Somerset
- Region: South West
- Country: England
- Sovereign state: United Kingdom
- Post town: Sherborne
- Postcode district: DT9
- Dialling code: 01963
- Police: Avon and Somerset
- Fire: Devon and Somerset
- Ambulance: South Western
- UK Parliament: Glastonbury and Somerton

Milborne Port is a village, electoral ward and civil parish in Somerset, England, east of Sherborne, and in the South Somerset district. It has a population of 2,802. The parish includes the hamlets of Milborne Wick and Kingsbury Regis.

The village is surrounded by green fields and countryside on the banks of the River Gascoigne, a tributary of the River Ivel or River Yeo.

The village has a primary school, which occupies the site of the former infant school. The junior school was closed and all pupils and staff moved to the infant site. In 2006 a new three-classroom extension was opened.

== History ==
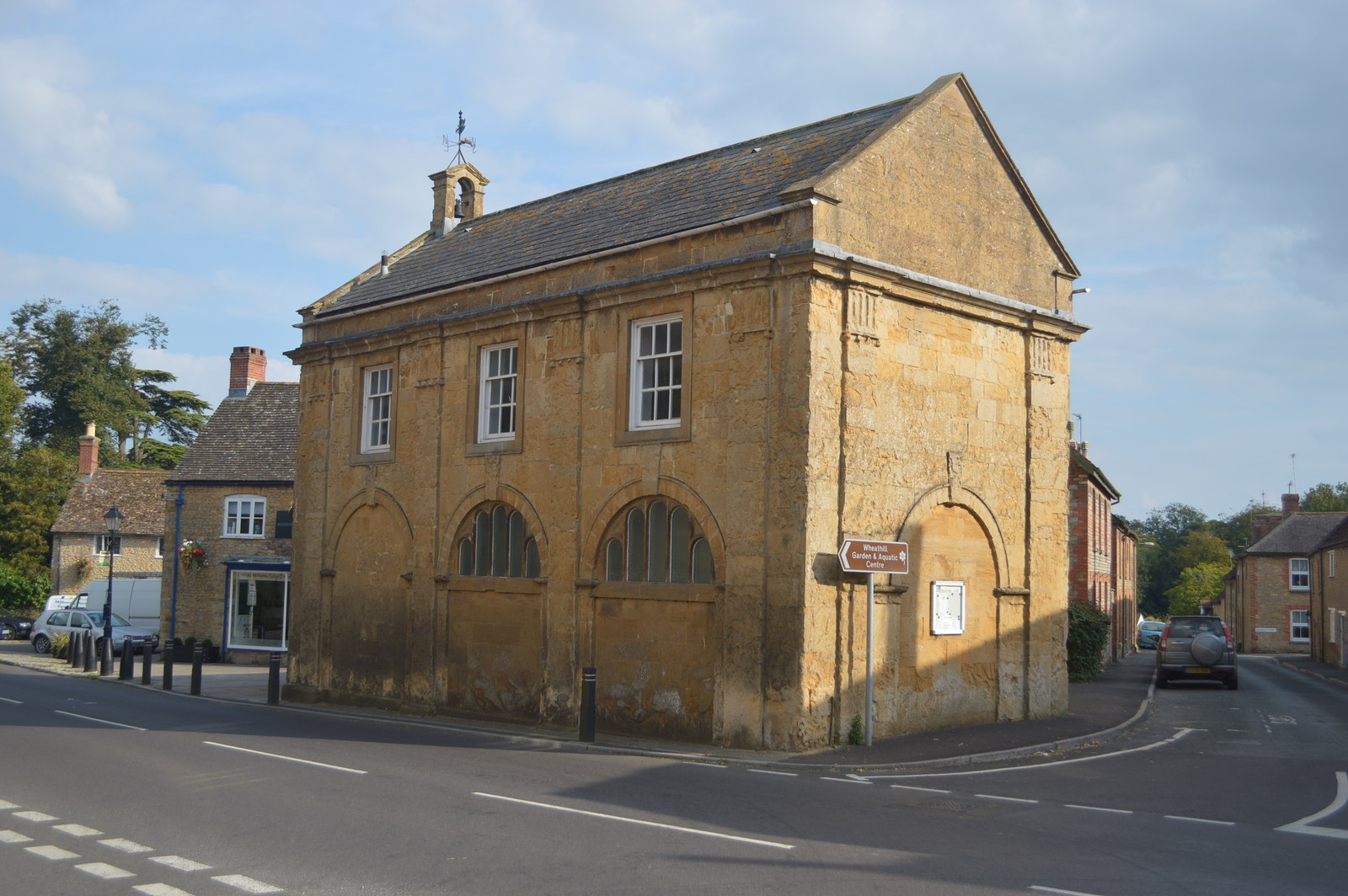
Milborne Port Town Hall

The nearby Laycock Railway Cutting is the best single exposure of the Bathonian ’Fuller's Earth Rock' in South Somerset. Ammonites indicating the Morrisi and Subcontractus zones of the Middle Bathonian are frequent. Miller's Hill is a geological Site of Special Scientific Interest which is an important and historically famous locality for studies of Middle Jurassic (Bajocian) stratigraphy and palaeontology.

Prehistoric features and finds have been located on the Iron Age hill fort on Barrow Hill, in the north of the parish.

In the Saxon period Milborne Port was important as a mint town, between 997 and 1035. It is one of at least nineteen mint towns which were neither an Alfredian borough nor an eleventh-century shire town, but a minster site. The market was the most profitable in Somerset in 1086, and the town was eighth in the county tax collection in 1340.

The "port" in the towns name signifies an important market town and was first recorded in 1249. The parish was part of the hundred of Horethorne.

Milborne Port Town Hall, which was commissioned as a market house, was completed in 1720. In 1770, the town hall was the site of events involving an exploding squib at the local fair that would result in a landmark case for the development of modern tort (personal injury) law. The case of Scott v. Shepherd helped establish the principles of remoteness, foreseeability, and intervening cause in modern common law torts. Shepherd tossed a lit squib into a crowded market in the town, where it landed on the table of a gingerbread merchant named Yates. Willis, a bystander, grabbed the squib and threw it across the market to protect himself and the gingerbread. Unfortunately, the squib landed in the goods of another merchant named Ryal. Ryal immediately grabbed the squib and tossed it away, accidentally hitting Scott in the face just as the squib exploded. The explosion put out one of Scott's eyes. Shepherd was found to be fully liable, because, said De Gray CJ, "I do not consider [the intermediaries] as free agents in the present case, but acting under a compulsive necessity for their own safety and self-preservation."

In 1805, the town was described as follows:

"MILBORN PORT, (Som.) bor. dist. from London 113 m. 7 f. [furlongs] situated on a branch of the river Parret, and may be considered as divided into three parts, viz. Milborn Port, Kingsbury Regis, and Milborn Wyke; however, the borough and Kingsbury lie in many places promiscuously intermixed together, both in the main town, and at Milborn Wyke; Milborn Wyke being as a village 1 m. N.... In Kingsbury is an annual court-baron held, wherein lord's rents are paid, presentments are made, and a constable, tythingman, and hayward, are appointed, for the year ensuing... Number of actual voters, 9, nominally 114. The church has a square tower, 6 bells, a clock, and chimes; one dissenting meeting-house, and upwards of 1000 inhabitants. The manufactures are dowlas, tick, white baize, linsey, stockings, and shoes. No market, but is supposed to have had one formerly. Fairs, 5 June, and 23 Oct., for cattle and toys. The post is despatched to Sherborne every day at 1 o'clock, and one arrives from thence at the same hour. Near it, on the left, is the seat of William Coles Medlecot, esq."

Under the Reform Act 1832, the town lost its status as a Parliamentary constituency, due to the gerrymandering activities of both parties in preceding elections.

In April 1873 a local shepherd, William Osmond, was victimised and sent to jail with six months hard labour for organising agricultural labourers in the area (inspired by George Mitchell, Somerset leader of the National Agricultural Labourers Union). On his release in January 1874 over 2,000 supporters marched through Milborne Port in his support. The farmer Charles Bugg, who victimised Osmond, died it is said of "shame" in January 1874.

The village was a thriving leather and leather glove manufacturing area. In 1826, The Earl of Ilchester presented a petition to Parliament for them, against the importation of leather. The last factory closed in 1970.

Ven House with its orangery, entrance gateway, pavilions, terrace, stabling & other outbuildings was built in 1730 by Richard Grange and Decimus Burton. It is a grade I listed building.

== Governance ==
The parish council has responsibility for local issues, including setting an annual precept (local rate) to cover the council's operating costs and producing annual accounts for public scrutiny. The parish council evaluates local planning applications and works with the local police, district council officers, and neighbourhood watch groups on matters of crime, security, and traffic. The parish council's role also includes initiating projects for the maintenance and repair of parish facilities, as well as consulting with the district council on the maintenance, repair, and improvement of highways, drainage, footpaths, public transport, and street cleaning. Conservation matters (including trees and listed buildings) and environmental issues are also the responsibility of the council.

The village falls within the non-metropolitan district of South Somerset, which was formed on 1 April 1974 under the Local Government Act 1972, having previously been part of Wincanton Rural District. The district council is responsible for local planning and building control, local roads, council housing, environmental health, markets and fairs, refuse collection and recycling, cemeteries and crematoria, leisure services, parks, and tourism.

Somerset County Council is responsible for running the largest and most expensive local services such as education, social services, libraries, main roads, public transport, policing and fire services, trading standards, waste disposal and strategic planning.

It is also part of the Glastonbury and Somerton county constituency represented in the House of Commons of the Parliament of the United Kingdom. It elects one Member of Parliament (MP) by the first past the post system of election.

== Church ==
The cruciform church of Church of St John the Evangelist is of late Anglo-Saxon date and parts may well span the Norman Conquest. The chancellor Regimbald (a survivor from Edward's reign into William's) rebuilt his Minster at Milborne Port in "a sumptuous hybrid style". It would seem logical to assign the now-demolished nave to this period, since the surviving south doorway of the nave was incorporated into the 1860s rebuild and is perhaps of Saxo-Norman design.

However, despite the Victorian nave (almost totally rebuilt 1867–69) and accompanying north aisle, there remains the pre-conquest central tower, part transepts and chancel. The south transept was heavily restored in 1843. The north transept was rebuilt along with the nave, so compared to pre-1867 almost half of the Anglo-Saxon church has now gone.

The new nave is 28 feet (9 m) longer than the original it replaced. The old west front exhibited vestiges of triangular-headed arcading on either side of the inserted Perpendicular west window, and the lower part of the front was divided into compartments, by broad pilasters of plain square section. This was recorded by photography and the photo was published in 1893 by A. Reynolds, who was involved with building the new nave.

The crossing (tower) is wider in plan than the nave, and markedly wider than the transepts or chancel. This is a distinctive Saxon trait, which may also be observed at nearby Sherborne Abbey (where significant traces of the Saxon rubble west wall may be seen, and which include a Saxon doorway in the north aisle). Inside, the four crossing arches with their jambs survive, although the east and west arches have been rebuilt in pointed 14th-century form; the south and north arches have been slightly deformed to elliptical shape due to the pressure of the masonry, perhaps by the addition of the top stage of the tower in Norman times.

The chancel exhibits pilaster strip work, much disturbed and cut by Early English period windows, and has a close parallel at Bradford-on-Avon. The wall thickness of the chancel is 2 ft 8 in (0.81 m), which is a typical Anglo-Saxon dimension. The church, with its Anglo-Saxon features, is of major importance to our understanding of the larger minsters in pre-conquest England.

The church has been designated by English Heritage as a Grade I listed building.

A mission church of 1891 serves Milborne Wick.

== Notable people ==
- Thomas Medlycott (1697–1763), local MP 1734/1742 and 1747/1763.
- Mary Scott (1751-1793), an English poet; she authored The Female Advocate in 1774, a work advocating for women's participation in writing and literature.
- Sir Robert Ensor (1877–1958), writer, poet, journalist, liberal intellectual and historian.

== See also ==
- Regis (Place)
- List of place names with royal patronage in the United Kingdom
