= Magna Britannia =

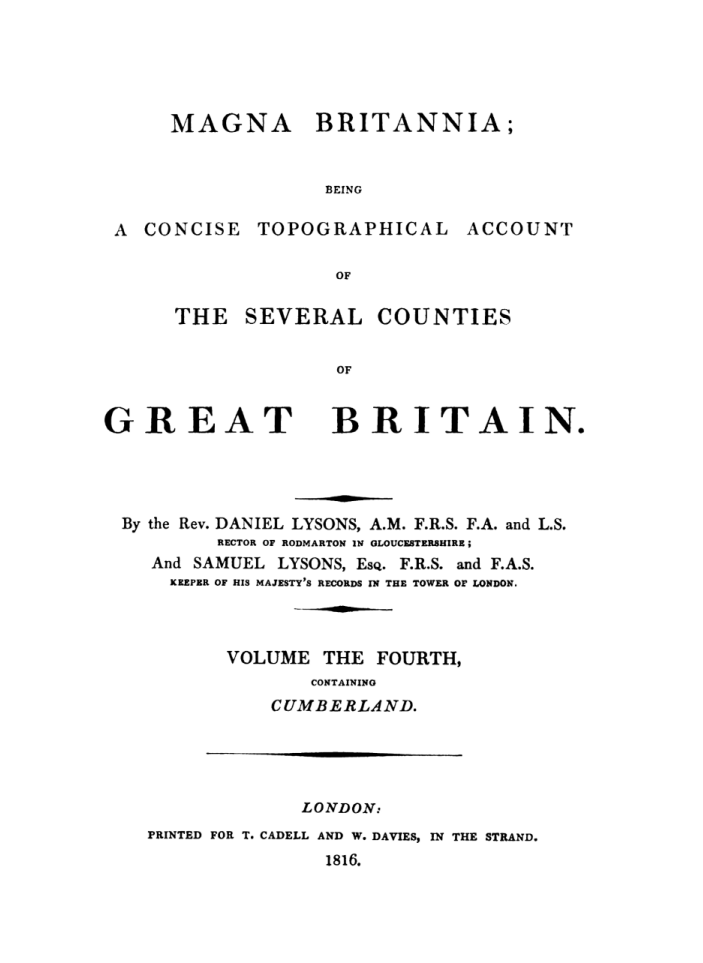
Title page of Volume 4 (Cumberland)

Magna Britannia, being a concise topographical account of the several counties of Great Britain was a topographical and historical survey published by the antiquarians Daniel Lysons and his brother Samuel Lysons in several volumes between 1806 and 1822. It covers the counties of Bedfordshire, Berkshire, Buckinghamshire, Cambridgeshire, Cheshire, Cornwall, Cumberland, Derbyshire, and Devon. The work was curtailed in 1819 on Samuel Lysons' death.

Unlike other similar works published in the seventeenth and eighteenth centuries, Magna Britannia is of significant value to economists and social historians because the Lysons brothers included content on topics such as population, manufacture and commerce. They were also far less preoccupied than many antiquarians with coats of arms and pedigrees, and did not overstate the grandeur of the counties, as local topographers were apt to do.

An earlier work under the same title had been compiled by Thomas Cox.

== Volumes ==
- Volume 1, Bedfordshire, Berkshire, and Buckinghamshire, 1806
- Volume 2, Cambridgeshire and the County Palatine of Chester, 1810
- Volume 3, Cornwall, London, 1814
- Volume 4, Cumberland, 1816
- Volume 5, Derbyshire, 1817
- Volume 6, Devonshire, 1822

== See also ==
- William Camden's Britannia
