= An Impartial Hand =

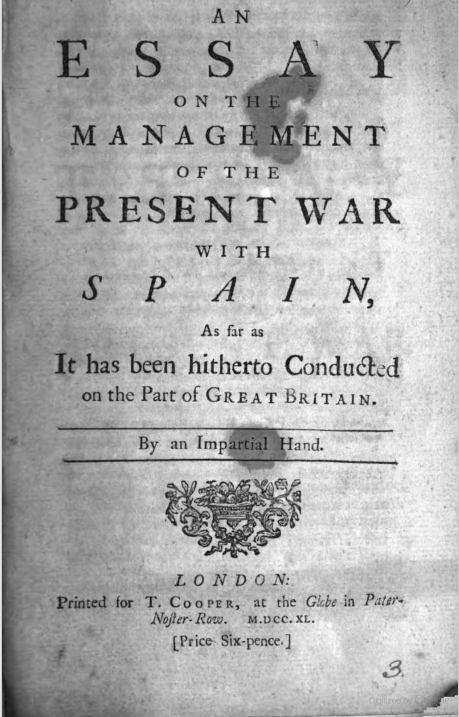
Title page of An Essay on the Management of the Present War with Spain by "an Impartial hand" held in the Bodleian Library Oxford.

An Impartial Hand is a pen name or attribution used by several authors, notably:

- Samuel Johnson
- Thomas Cox (topographer) (disputed)
- John Foxe

It is also used as a characterization, for example by:

- Sir Samuel Tuke, 1st Baronet
