= St Michael-le-Querne =

Coordinates: 51°30′46″N 0°5′51″W

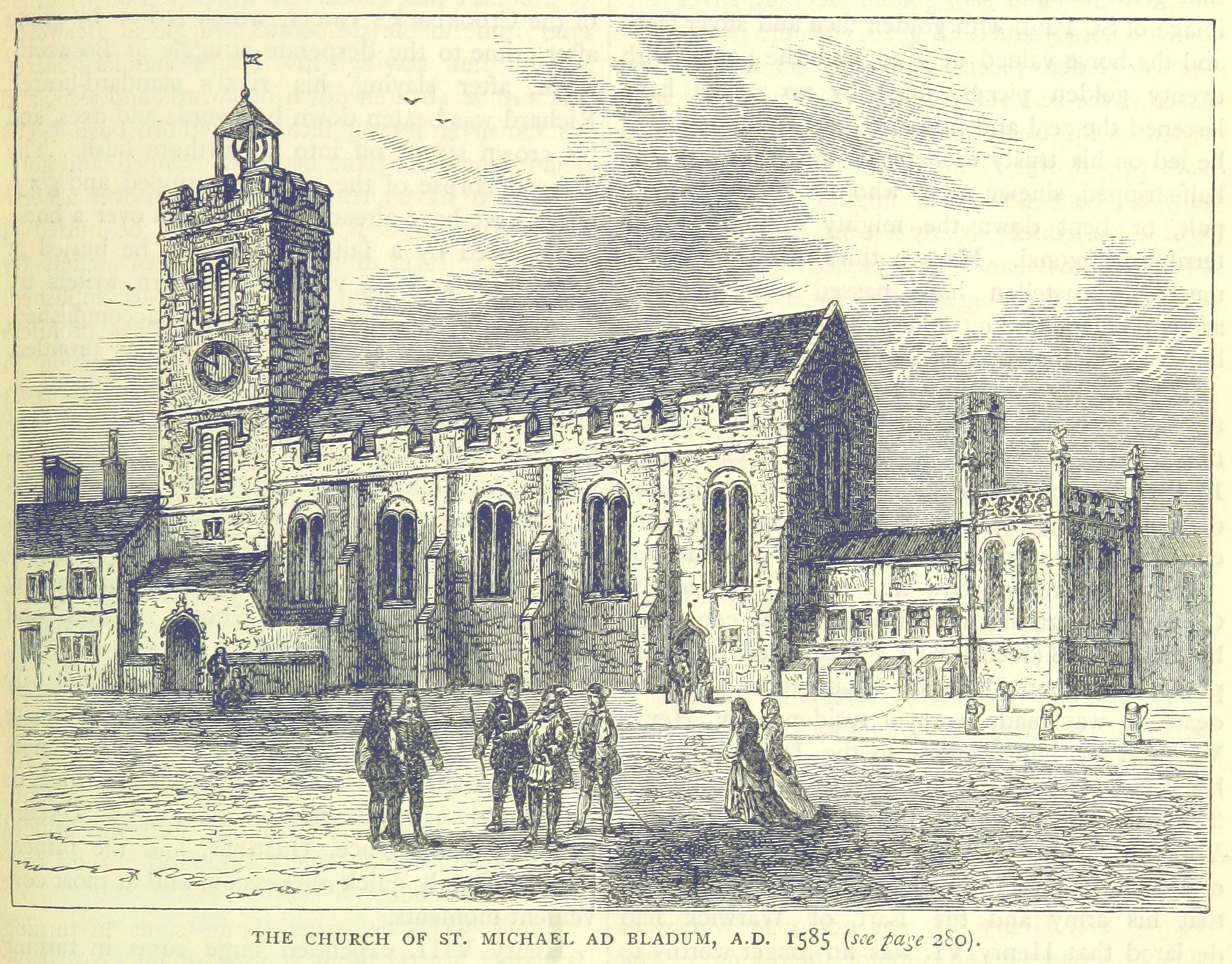
- The church in 1585
- St Michael-le-Querne
- Location: Panyer Alley, London
- Country: England
- Denomination: Church of England

Architecture
- Demolished: 1666

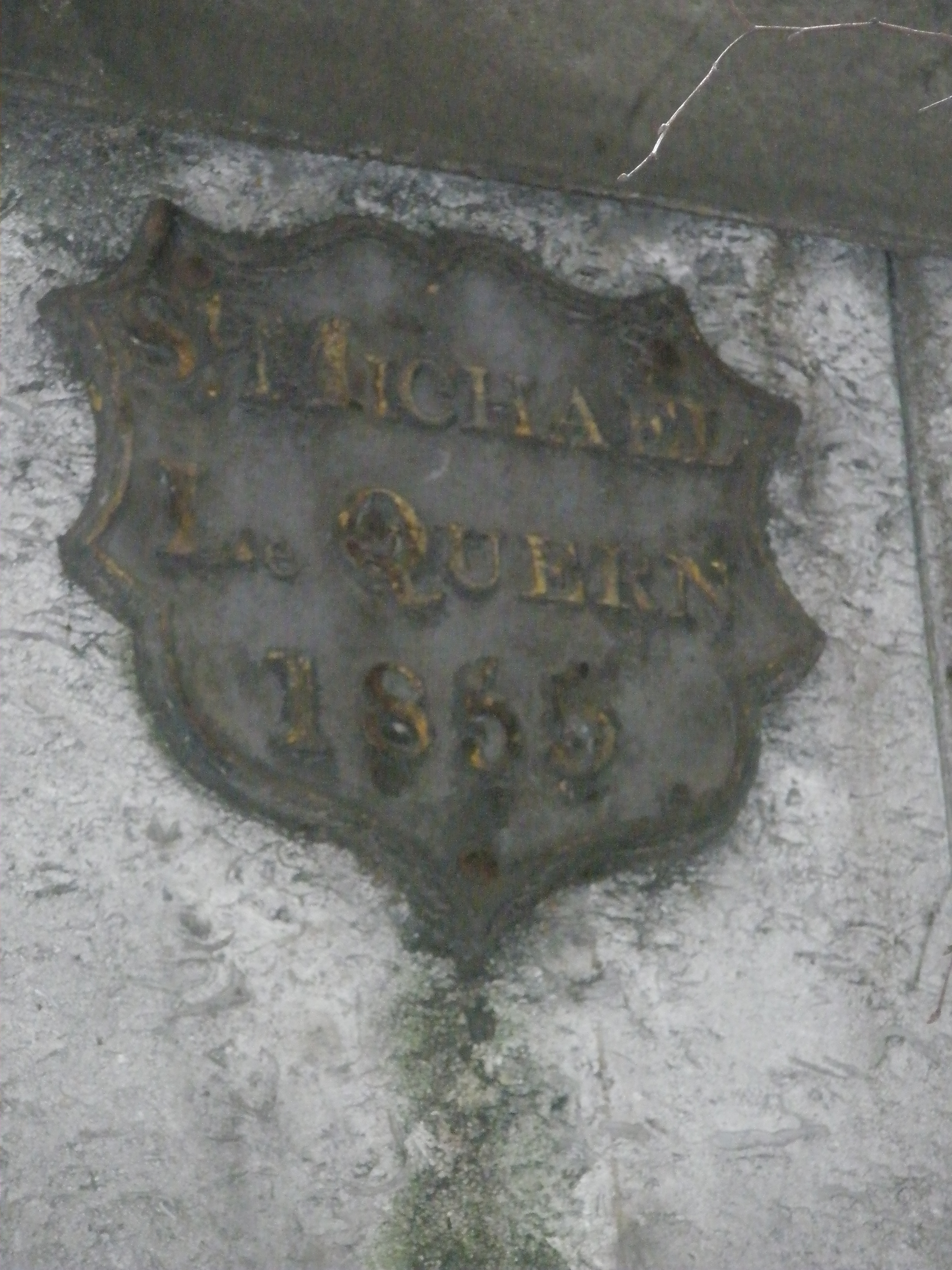
Parish boundary mark on the wall of St Paul's Cathedral Choir School

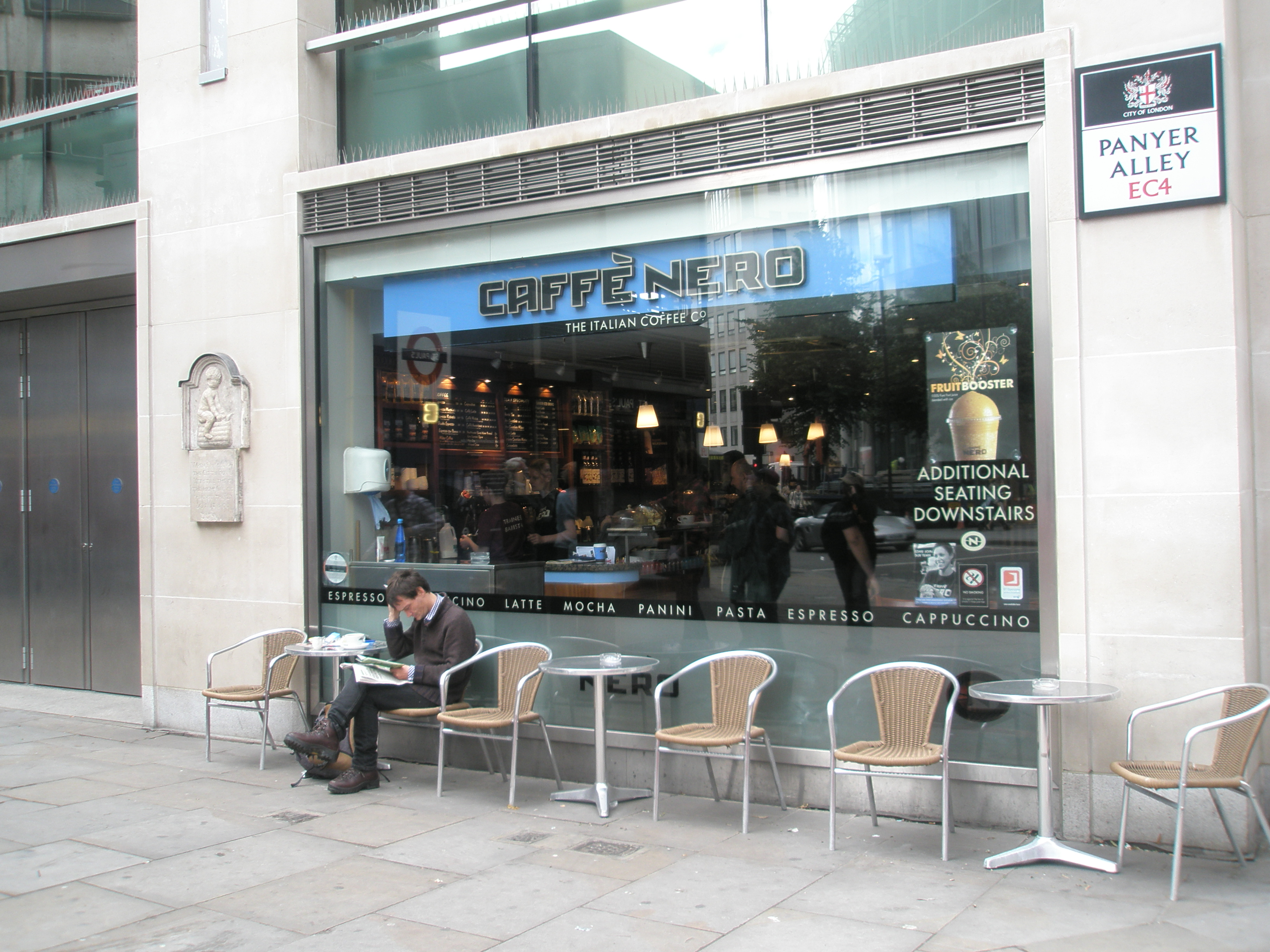
Current photo of site

St Michael-le-Querne, also called St Michael ad Bladum, was a parish church in the Farringdon Within Ward in the City of London. It was destroyed in the Great Fire of London of 1666 and not rebuilt. The name is apparently a reference to a quern-stone as there was a corn market in the churchyard.

== History ==
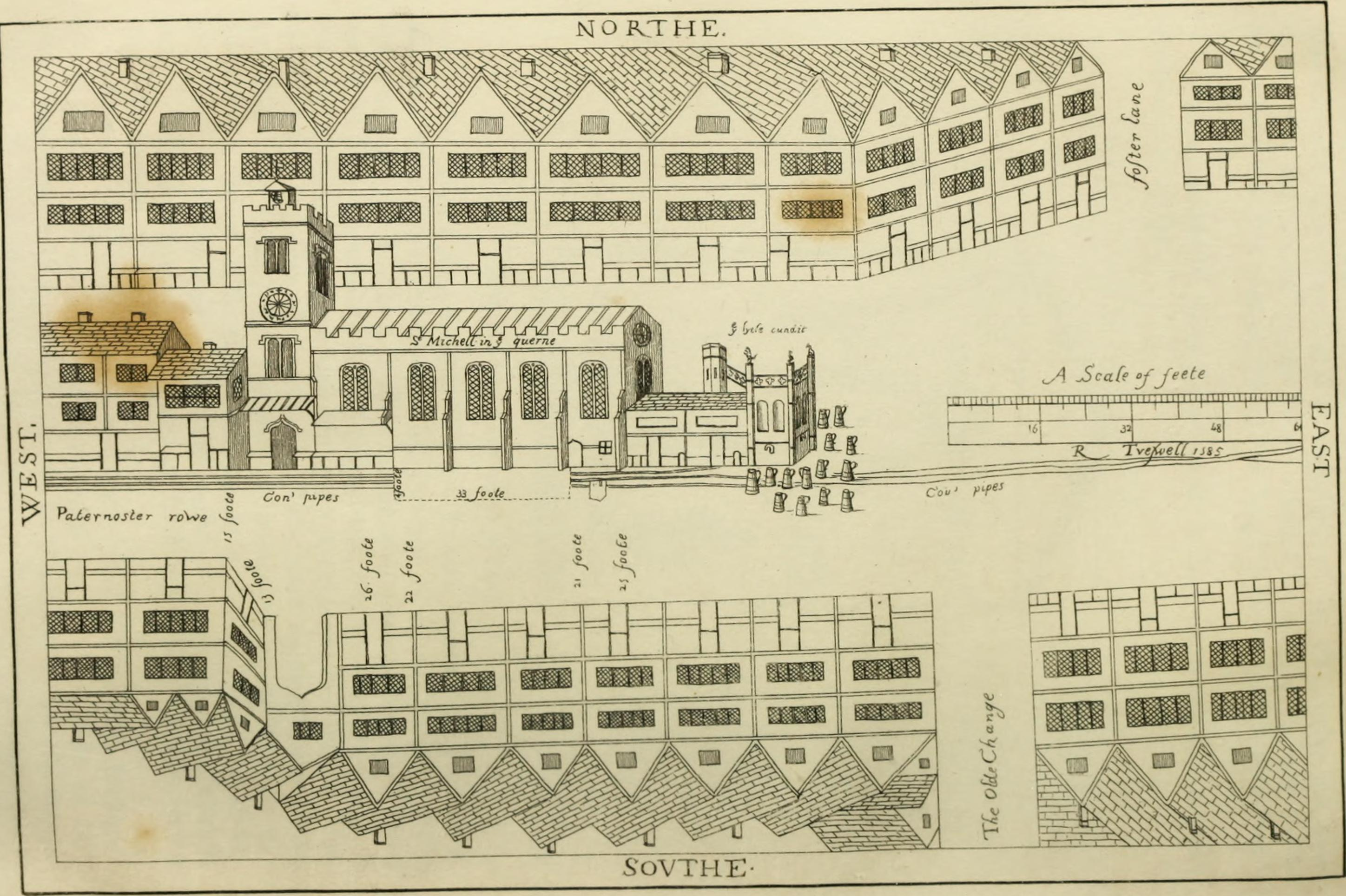
Map showing S. Michell in ye Querne; also marked are Paternoster Row, Foster Lane and Old Change.

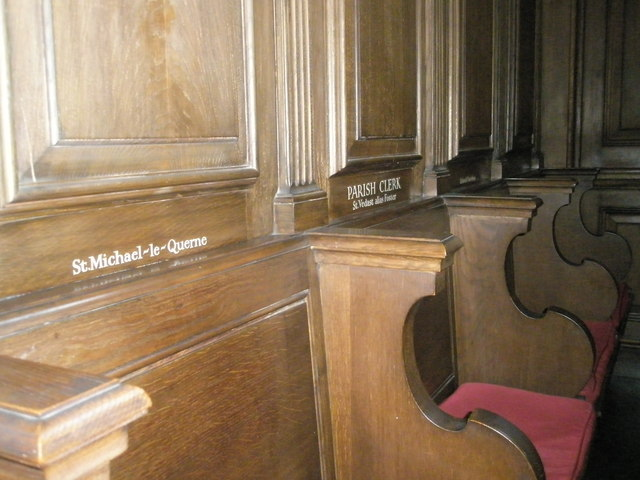
The St Michael-le-Querne inscription in the choir of St Vedast alias Foster

The church stood immediately to the north east of Paternoster Row in Farringdon Within Ward. Its dedication derives from a 12th-century reference to its proximity to a corn market. It was in existence by 1181, when it was recorded in a survey of land and churches belonging to St Paul's Cathedral. St Michael's was rebuilt in 1430, the City having given small strips of land on the north and east sides to allow for its enlargement, and "repaired and beautified" in 1617.

The antiquarian John Leland, who died in 1552, was buried in the church.

== Destruction ==
Along with the majority of the parish churches in the City, St Michael-le-Querne was destroyed by the Great Fire in 1666. A Rebuilding Act was passed in 1670, and a committee set up under Sir Christopher Wren, decided to rebuild 51 of the churches. St Michael's was not among them. Instead the parish was united with that of St Vedast Foster Lane. The site of the church was cleared to allow for the widening of Cheapside, although Richard Newcourt noted that "some small part of one Corner of the Steeple, was for Ornament and Uniformity, added to the Houses there built."
