= Anthony Hall (antiquarian) =

Anthony Hall (1679 – 1723) was an English clergyman, academic and antiquary.

== Life ==
Born at Kirkbride, Cumberland, he was the son of Henry Hall, rector of the parish. After schooling at Carlisle he was admitted a batler of The Queen's College, Oxford, 7 July 1696, but did not matriculate until 18 November 1698. He took his bachelor's degree 15 December 1701, and, having been ordained, proceeded M.A. 16 June 1704. He was elected Fellow of his college 18 April 1706.

In November 1716, Hall was an unsuccessful candidate for the librarianship of the Bodleian Library, vacated by the death of John Hudson, who had hoped that Hall might succeed him. Hall also married Hudson's widow, Margaret, daughter of Sir Robert Harrison, an alderman and mercer of Oxford.

On 8 April 1720, Hall received institution to the college rectory of Hampton Poyle, Oxfordshire, and on 4 July 1721 accumulated his degrees in divinity. He died at Garford, and was buried at Kingston Bagpuize on 6 April 1723. His wife survived him.

== Works ==
Hudson bequeathed to Hall the editing of his edition of Flavius Josephus, then nearly finished. It was published in 1720 in two folio volumes.

Hall's literary labours were criticised in his lifetime, though they were printed at the Oxford University Press. Thomas Hearne called him lazy and a drinker. Edward Thwaites and other fellows of Queen's persuaded him in 1705 to edit John Leland's Commentarii de Scriptoribus Britannicis from the manuscript in the Bodleian Library, concealing the fact from Thomas Tanner, who had been at work uon an edition for ten or twelve years. The book appeared in March 1709 in two octavo volumes; Hearne says that it was full of errors, caused by incapacity to read the manuscript.

Hall was an editor of the chronicler Nicholas Trivet, and his text was later used by Thomas Hog. In 1719 he published Nicolai Triveti Annales sex Regum Angliæ. E … Codice Glastoniensi, Oxford, 1719. From the same manuscript he edited Nicolai Triveti Annalium Continuatio; ut et Adami Murimuthensis Chronicon, cum ejusdem continuatione; quibus accedunt Joannis Bostoni Speculum Cœnobitarum et Edmundi Boltoni Hypercritica, Oxford, 1722. Hall furnished the introduction and account of the ancient state of Britain for Thomas Cox's Magna Britannia, 1720. He claimed the account of Berkshire, but disowned the description of Cumberland in a postscript to his edition of Trivet's Annales. In the proposals for the publication of John Urry's Chaucer, 1716, the addition of a glossary was promised by Hall, but it apparently was completed by a student of Christ Church.

Hall's correspondence with Arthur Charlett was preserved in the Ballard collection in the Bodleian Library (xviii. 23–7). His portrait was engraved by George Vertue.
