= James Carley =

Canadian historian

- Born: James P. Carley
- Occupation: historian of English history

James P. Carley is a Canadian historian of English history and bibliographer, currently a Distinguished Research Professor at York University and a Fellow of the Royal Society of Canada. He specializes in the history and provenance of medieval English manuscripts and the early Tudor period.

== Education and Career ==
Carley received his B.A. in English from the University of Victoria, his M.A. in English from Dalhousie University, and his PhD in Medieval Studies from the University of Toronto.

He has written about the history of Glastonbury Abbey, Tudor antiquary John Leland, sixteenth-century book culture, the foundation and early history of Lambeth Palace Library, as well as on the Arthurian legends, and the modern British novelist Lawrence Durrell.

Carley held the Sandars Readership in Bibliography at Cambridge University in 2010-2011 lecturing on "From private hoard to public repository: archbishops John Whitgift and Richard Bancroft as founders of Lambeth Palace Library." The lecture was expanded upon and published in The Book Collector in 2013.

In August 2019, Carley became the first Canadian to receive the Bibliographical Society Gold Medal from the Bibliographical Society.

== Selected publications ==
- Carley, James P., and Charles Burnett, eds. 2023. Hebraism in Sixteenth-Century England: Robert and Thomas Wakefield. Toronto: Pontifical Institute of Mediaeval Studies.
- Carley, James P. 2004. The Books of King Henry VIII and His Wives. London: British Library.
- Carley, James P. 2001. Glastonbury Abbey and the Arthurian Tradition. Cambridge: D.S. Brewer.
- Carley, James P. 1989. “John Leland and the Contents of English Pre-Dissolution Libraries: Lincolnshire.” Transactions of the Cambridge Bibliographical Society 9 (4): 330–57.
