= John Hudson (classicist) =

English classical scholar (1662–1719)

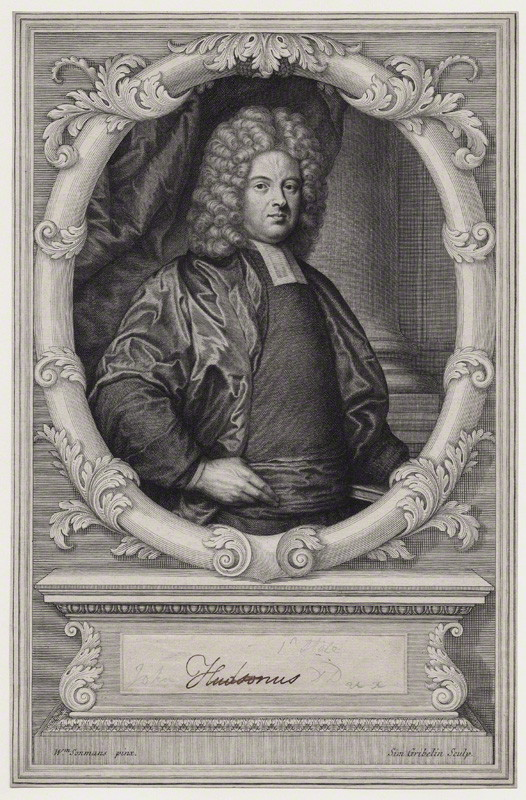

John Hudson (1662 – 26 November 1719), English classical scholar, was born at Wythop, near Cockermouth in Cumberland.

He was educated at The Queen's College, Oxford, and spent the rest of his life at the University: appointed as a Fellow of University College, Oxford in 1686, Bodley's librarian in 1701, and in 1711 principal of St Mary Hall, Oxford. His political views stood in the way of his preferment in the church and university.

As an editor and commentator, he enjoyed a high reputation both at home and abroad. His works, chiefly editions of classical authors, include the following:

- Velleius Paterculus (1693).
- Thucydides (1696).
- Geographiae Veteris Scriptores Graeci minores (1698–1712) containing the works and fragments of 21 authors and the learned, though diffuse, dissertations of Henry Dodwell. A rare and valuable work, which in spite of its faulty text was not superseded until the appearance of Karl Wilhelm Ludwig Müller's edition in the Didot series.
- The first edition of Aelius Moeris', De Vocibus Atticis et Hellenicis (1712).
- Flavius Josephus (1720, published posthumously by his friend Anthony Hall, the antiquary), a correct and beautifully printed edition, with variorum notes and Latin translation.
