= John Leland (antiquary) =

English Tudor poet and antiquary

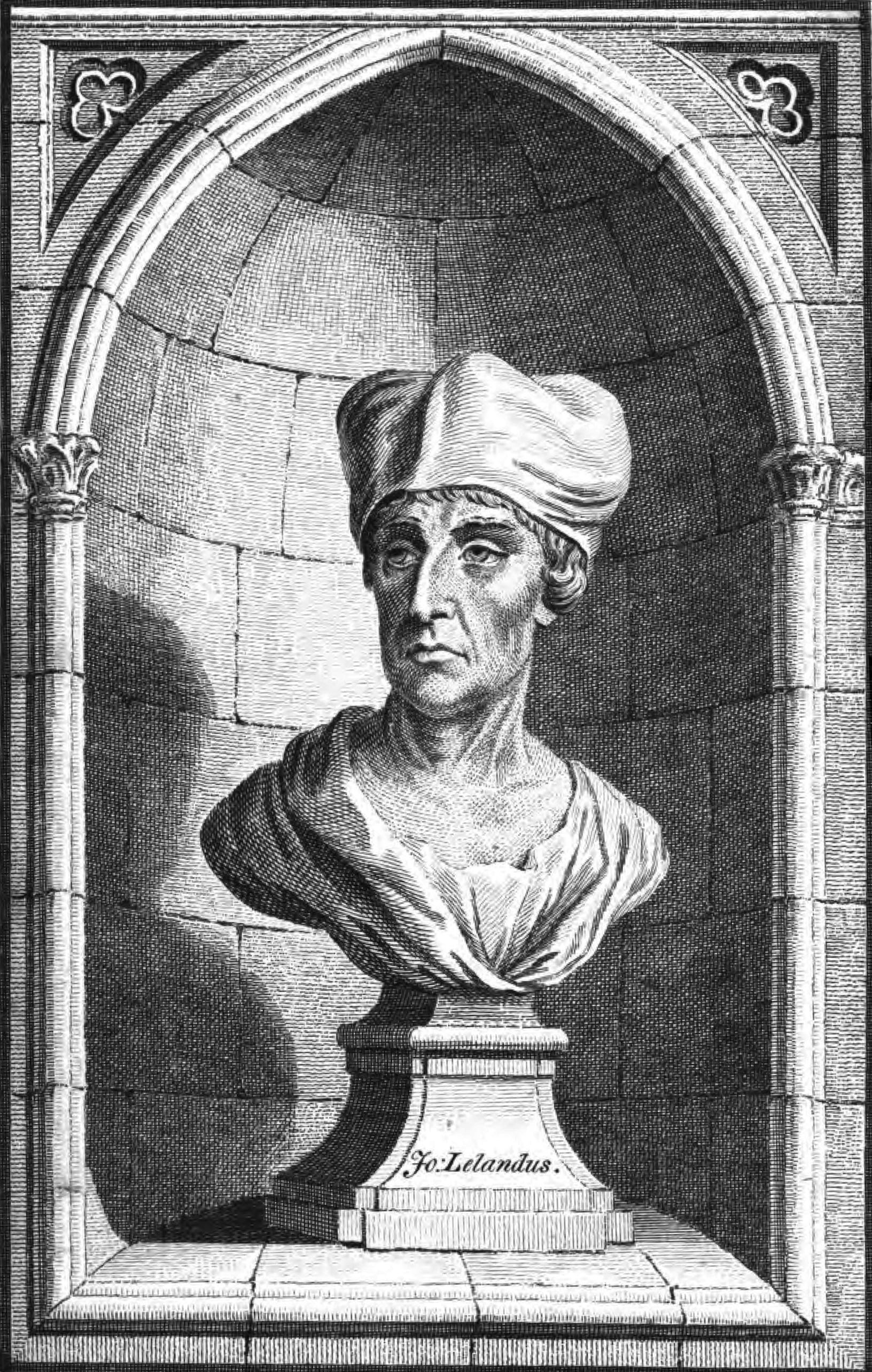
- Line engraving by Charles Grignion the Elder (1772), purportedly taken from a bust of John Leland at All Souls College, Oxford. Sculptor Louis François Roubiliac (d. 1762) probably created the original bust.
- Born: 13 September c. 1503; London, England
- Died: 18 April 1552
- Resting place: Parish church of St Michael-le-Querne, London; 51.512778°N 0.0975°W
- Monuments: Destroyed by fire in 1666
- Other names: John Leyland, Layland
- Education: St Paul's School (London); Christ's College, Cambridge; All Souls College, Oxford
- Known for: Latin poetry, antiquarianism
- Notable work: include Cygnea cantio (1545)
- Relatives: An elder brother called John

John Leland or Leyland (13 September, c. 1503 – 18 April 1552) was an English poet and antiquary.

Leland has been described as "the father of English local history and bibliography". His Itinerary provided a unique source of observations and raw materials for many subsequent antiquaries, and introduced the county as the basic unit for studying the local history of England, an idea that has been influential ever since.

== Early life and education ==
Most evidence for Leland's life and career comes from his own writings, especially his poetry. He was born in London on 13 September, most probably in about 1503, and had an older brother, also named John. Having lost both his parents at an early age, he and his brother were raised by Thomas Myles. Leland was educated at St Paul's School, London, under its first headmaster, William Lily. It was here that he already met some of his future benefactors, notably William Paget.

Leland was subsequently sent to Christ's College, Cambridge, graduating in 1522 (BA). While studying there, he was for a short time imprisoned, having accused a certain knight of collaborating with Richard de la Pole, the Yorkist claimant to the throne (d. 1525). He proceeded to Lambeth, London, serving Thomas Howard, 2nd Duke of Norfolk, as tutor to his son Thomas. When the duke died in 1524, the king sent Leland to Oxford, where as Anthony Wood later claimed from tradition, he became a fellow of All Souls College. He would later deplore the state of education at Oxford, which he felt was too conservative in its approach to classical studies.

Between 1526 and 1528, Leland proceeded to Paris, studying along with many fellow expatriates, both English and German. His original plan to study in Italy, too, never succeeded. Leland honed his skills at composing Latin poetry and sought the acquaintance of humanist scholars whom he much admired, such as Guillaume Budé and Jacques Lefèvre d'Étaples. A scholar of particular importance for Leland was François Dubois (Silvius), professor at the Collège de Tournai, who had a profound effect on his poetic as well as antiquarian interests. While in France, Leland kept in touch with his friends and sponsors in England, probably including Thomas Wolsey (d. 1530), Cardinal and Lord Chancellor, who made him rector at Laverstoke, Hampshire.

== Royal appointment ==
By 1529, Leland had returned to England. When Wolsey fell from the king's favour in that year, Leland appears to have sought the patronage of Thomas Cromwell, a relationship which would help explain his rising fortunes over the next few years. He was appointed one of the chaplains to King Henry VIII, who gave him the rectory of Peuplingues (Pepeling), in the marshes of Calais (though he may never have visited the place). In 1533, Leland received papal dispensation for four benefices, on condition that he became subdeacon within two years and priest within seven. He was appointed prebendary of Wilton Abbey in Wiltshire in 1535 and received two adjacent benefices.

Leland and Nicholas Udall composed verses to be read or recited at the pageant of Anne Boleyn's arrival in London in 1533, which was staged for the occasion of her coronation. Their common patron was probably Thomas, Duke of Norfolk and Cornwall. The poets worked together again during 1533 and 1534, when Leland contributed verses for Udall's Floures for Latine Spekynge.

== Library tours, 1533–36 ==
In 1533, the king appears to have entrusted Leland with a document, "a moste gratius commission" (or principis diploma as he called it in Latin), which authorized him to examine and use the libraries of all religious houses in England. Leland spent the next few years travelling from house to house, for the most part shortly before they were dissolved, compiling numerous lists of significant or unusual books in their libraries. About 1535, he met the ex-Carmelite churchman and fellow antiquary John Bale, who much admired his work and offered his assistance.

In 1536, not long after the Suppression of Religious Houses Act 1535 commanding the dissolution of lesser monasteries was passed, Leland lamented the spoliation of monastic libraries and addressed Thomas Cromwell in a letter seeking aid for the rescue of books. He complained that

The Germans perceive our desidiousness, and do send daily young scholars hither that spoileth [books], and cutteth them out of libraries, returning home and putting them abroad as monuments of their own country.

In the 1530s and 1540s, the royal library was reorganised to accommodate hundreds of books that were previously kept in monastic collections. Leland himself describes how Henry's palaces at Greenwich, Hampton Court and Westminster were adapted for the purpose. Leland's part in this is uncertain.

In humanist fashion, Leland styled himself antiquarius, a title which was at one time interpreted as referring to a formal appointment as "king's antiquary": however, it is now understood to have been merely Leland's own preferred way of describing himself. There is no evidence that he personally oversaw the relocation of the books to their new home or received a librarian's wages. What he did do was to compile his lists of important volumes, and to take measures to encourage their preservation.

== Itineraries, c. 1538–43 ==
Even after the Dissolution of the Monasteries, Leland did not abandon his hunt for books. For instance, he obtained official permission to avail himself of the library belonging to the defunct monastery of Bury St Edmunds. The descriptions of Britain which he encountered in the manuscripts, however, and his personal experiences of travel, also sparked off fresh interests. By about 1538, Leland had turned his attention to English and Welsh topography and antiquities, embarking on a series of journeys which lasted six years. Probably over the summer of 1538 (though there may also have been earlier and/or later trips), he made an extended excursion through Wales. He subsequently made a number of journeys in England: the exact sequence and their dates are again uncertain, but there seem to have been five major English itineraries, taken over the summers of the years 1539 to 1543. His one firmly dated itinerary is that of 1542, which took him to the West Country. By that date he had been on a tour to the north-west, which went via the Welsh marches to Cheshire, Lancashire and Cumberland; while other itineraries took him to the west Midlands, the north-east (reaching Yorkshire and County Durham), and the Bristol region. He probably explored the south-east in shorter excursions. He is not known to have toured East Anglia, for which only a few fragmentary notes survive.

Leland kept notebooks on his travels, in which he entered and assessed information from personal observation, and from books, charters and oral sources. It is this material which we now know as his 'Itinerary'.

In the 1906–10 edition, the Itinerary runs to five printed volumes. It comprises rough notes and very early drafts, the raw materials for a more digested description of England and Wales – Leland would not have envisaged publishing it in anything like its present form. The county on which he appears to have made greatest progress in organising his material was Kent. "Let this be the firste chapitre of the booke", he wrote; "The King hymself was borne yn Kent. Kent is the key of al Englande." John Bale later listed an Itinerarium Cantiae (Itinerary of Kent) among Leland's writings.

Although Leland's Itinerary notes remained unpublished until the eighteenth century, they provided a significant quarry of data and descriptions for William Camden's Britannia (first edition, 1586), and many other antiquarian works.

== The "New Year's Gift", 1544 ==
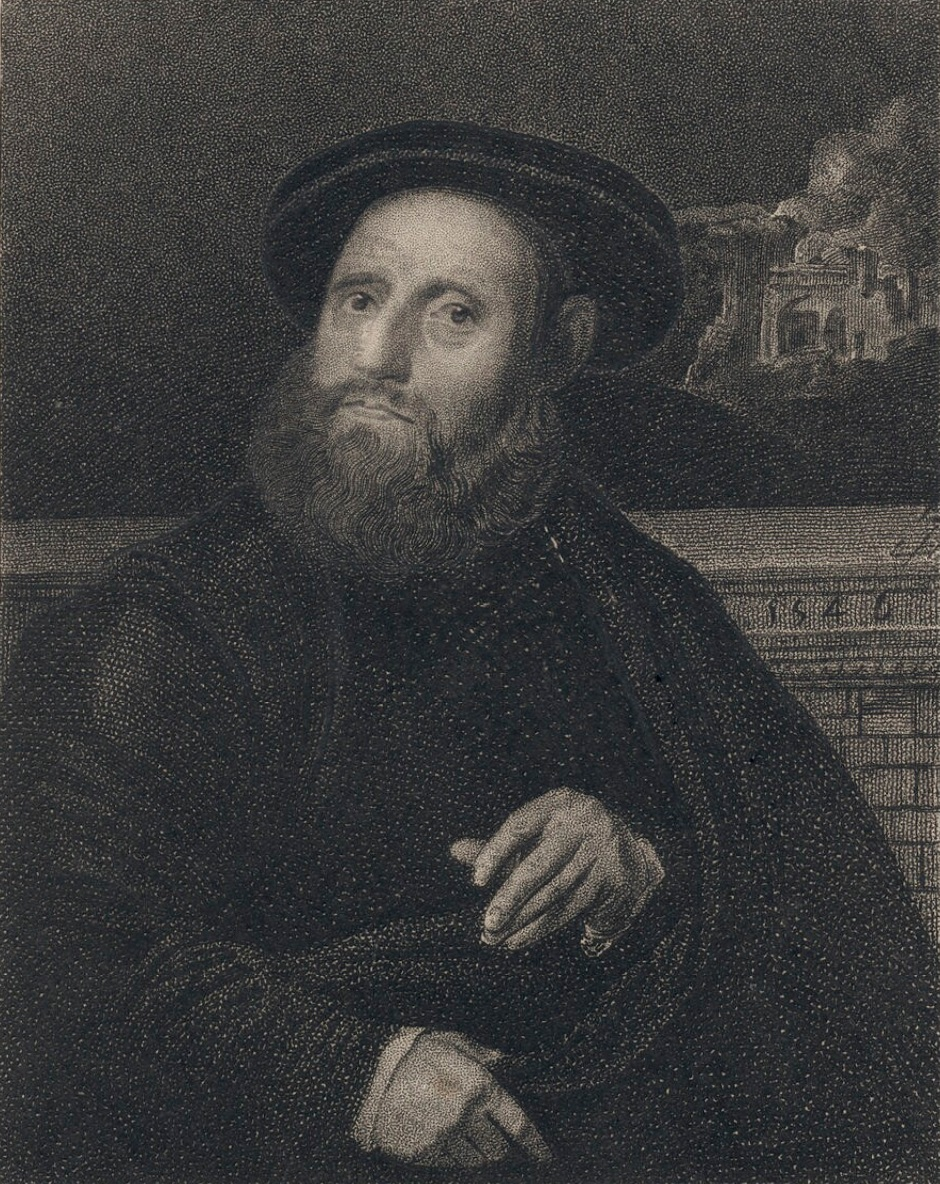
John Leland, by Thomas Charles Wageman after Hans Holbein the Younger

In the mid-1540s, Leland wrote a letter to Henry VIII in which he outlined his achievements so far, and his future plans. It was subsequently published by John Bale in 1549 (with Bale's own additional commentary) under the title The laboryouse journey & serche of Johan Leylande for Englandes antiquitees. The letter has traditionally (following Bale) been regarded as a "New Year's gift" to the King for January 1546, but James Carley has shown that it must have been composed in late 1543 or early 1544 (so that if it was presented at the new year, which is not certain, it would have been in 1544).

In the letter, Leland reported on his endeavours to preserve books, and the extent and thoroughness of his travels through England and Wales:

I have so travelid yn yowr dominions booth by the se costes and the midle partes, sparing nother labor nor costes, by the space of these vi. yeres paste, that there is almoste nother cape, nor bay, haven, creke or peere, river or confluence of rivers, breches, waschis, lakes, meres, fenny waters, montaynes, valleis, mores, hethes, forestes, wooddes, cities, burges, castelles, principale manor placis, monasteries, and colleges, but I have seene them; and notid yn so doing a hole worlde of thinges very memorable.

He also described what use he intended to make of the information he had accumulated. He noted four projects:

- De uiris illustribus, a biographical encyclopedia of British writers in four books, arranged chronologically.
- A detailed map of the realm engraved on a silver table, to be presented to the King (inspired by a set of table-maps once possessed by the Emperor Charlemagne), accompanied by a written description, the Liber de topographia Britanniae, and a key to identifying the British place-names given in ancient texts.
- A history of England and Wales, entitled De Antiquitate Britannica, or Civilis Historia. This work was to be divided into "so many bookes as there be shires yn England, and sheres and greate dominions yn Wales", i.e. about fifty: a further six books would deal with Britain's offshore islands.
- De nobilitate Britannica, a catalogue of royalty, nobility, and "capitaines and rulers", divided chronologically into three books.

Of these projects, De uiris illustribus was already largely complete (it was written in two phases, in c. 1535–36 and c. 1543–46), but the others would never come to fruition. Polydore Vergil appears to have suggested that Leland had been unrealistically over-ambitious: he was "a vaynegloryouse persone, whyche woulde promyse more, than ever he was able or intended to perfourme".

== Leland and archaeology ==
Leland was concerned to record evidence for the history of England and Wales as it was visible in the landscape, and he therefore took pains to note all kinds of archaeological remains, including megaliths, hillforts, and Roman and medieval ruins. He came across several Roman inscriptions, though he was unable to read most of them, complaining of one that it was made up of "letters for whole words, and 2. or 3. letters conveid in one". He often reported finds of coins, writing of Richborough, Kent, for example, that more Roman money had been discovered there "then in any place els of England". He investigated and recorded building materials in some detail.

He was sometimes able to make astute and informed deductions from what he saw. At Lincoln, for example, he identified three phases of urban development, beginning with a British settlement at the top of the hill (close to which "much Romaine mony is found"), the Saxon and medieval town further south, and a more recent riverside development at Wigford. He was able to judge that the existing fabric of Ripon Minster "indubitately was made sins the Conquest". He correctly distinguished what he called "Briton brykes" (actually Roman bricks) at several geographically dispersed sites, including Verulamium, Richborough, Lympne, Dover Castle, Canterbury, and Bewcastle.

He was normally content to record surface remains and recovered artefacts, but on one occasion he adopted a more interventionist approach. At the hillfort at Burrough Hill, Leicestershire, he pulled some stones from the gateway to establish whether it had been walled or not: they were mortared with lime, which persuaded him that it had been. The account included in Leland's Itinerary may be regarded as the earliest archaeological field report.

== Leland and King Arthur ==
Leland was a staunch patriot, and believed firmly in the historical veracity of King Arthur. He therefore took offence when the Italian scholar Polydore Vergil cast doubts on certain elements in the Arthurian legend in his Anglica Historia (published in 1534). Leland's first response was an unpublished tract, written perhaps in 1536, the Codrus sive Laus et Defensio Gallofridi Arturii contra Polydorum Vergilium. ("Codrus", a pseudonym for Vergil, was a type-name drawn from Juvenal for a wretched and dreary hack-poet.) He followed this with a longer published work, the Assertio inclytissimi Arturii regis Britannia (1544). In both texts, Leland drew on a wide range of literary, etymological, archaeological and oral sources to defend the historicity of Arthur. Although his central belief was flawed, his work preserved much evidence for the Arthurian tradition that might otherwise have been lost.

Leland's material provides invaluable evidence for reconstructing the lost "tomb monument" of Arthur (thought to be a fabrication of the twelfth century) at Glastonbury Abbey. He was probably also responsible for making a drawing of the lead cross that identified the grave as Arthur's, afterwards published as a woodcut in the 1607 edition of Camden's Britannia.

On his itinerary of 1542, Leland was the first to record the tradition (possibly influenced by the proximity of the villages of Queen Camel and West Camel) identifying the hillfort of Cadbury Castle in Somerset as Arthur's Camelot:

At the very south ende of the chirch of South-Cadbyri standeth Camallate, sumtyme a famose toun or castelle, apon a very torre or hille, wunderfully enstregnthenid of nature.... The people can telle nothing ther but that they have hard say that Arture much resortid to Camalat.

== Final years and death ==
In 1542, Henry presented Leland with the valuable rectory of Great Haseley, Oxfordshire. The year following he preferred him to a canonry of King's College, now Christ Church, Oxford, and about the same time, collated him to a prebend in the church of Sarum. He was an absentee pluralist, with the income and leisure to pursue his interests. He retired with his collections to his house in the parish of St Michael-le-Querne, adjoining Cheapside, London, where he intended to work on his various projects. However, in February 1547 near the time of Henry's death, "he fell besides his wits". Leland was certified insane in March 1550 and died, still mentally deranged, on 18 April 1552, aged about 48.

Leland was buried in the church of St Michael-le-Querne near his home. However the church was destroyed in the Great Fire of London in 1666, and not rebuilt, and so Leland's tomb has been lost.

== Collections and notebooks ==
Following Leland's death or (more probably) his descent into madness, King Edward VI arranged for Leland's library, including many medieval manuscripts, to be placed in the custody of Sir John Cheke. John Bale consulted some of them at this time. Cheke fell from favour on the accession of Queen Mary, and departed for mainland Europe in 1554: from that point onwards, and continuing after Cheke's death in 1557, the library was dispersed. Books were acquired by collectors including Sir William Cecil, William, Lord Paget, John Dee and Archbishop Matthew Parker.

Leland's own manuscript notebooks were inherited by Cheke's son, Henry, and in 1576 they were borrowed and transcribed by John Stow, allowing their contents to begin to circulate in antiquarian circles. Antiquaries who gained access to them through Stow included William Camden, William Harrison, Robert Glover and Francis Thynne. The original notebooks passed from Henry Cheke to Humphrey Purefoy, and so (following his death in 1598) to Humphrey's son Thomas, who divided many of them between his two cousins John Hales and the antiquary, William Burton. Burton subsequently managed to recover several of the items given to Hales, and in 1632 and 1642–3 donated most of the collection—comprising the Collectanea, De scriptoribus and several of the Itinerary notebooks—to the Bodleian Library, Oxford, where the volumes remain.

== The Leland Trail ==
The Leland Trail is a 28-mile (45 km) footpath, which follows the footsteps of John Leland as he traversed South Somerset between 1535 and 1543 in the course of his investigation of the region's antiquities. The Leland Trail begins at King Alfred's Tower on the Wiltshire/Somerset border and finishes at Ham Hill Country Park.

== Works ==
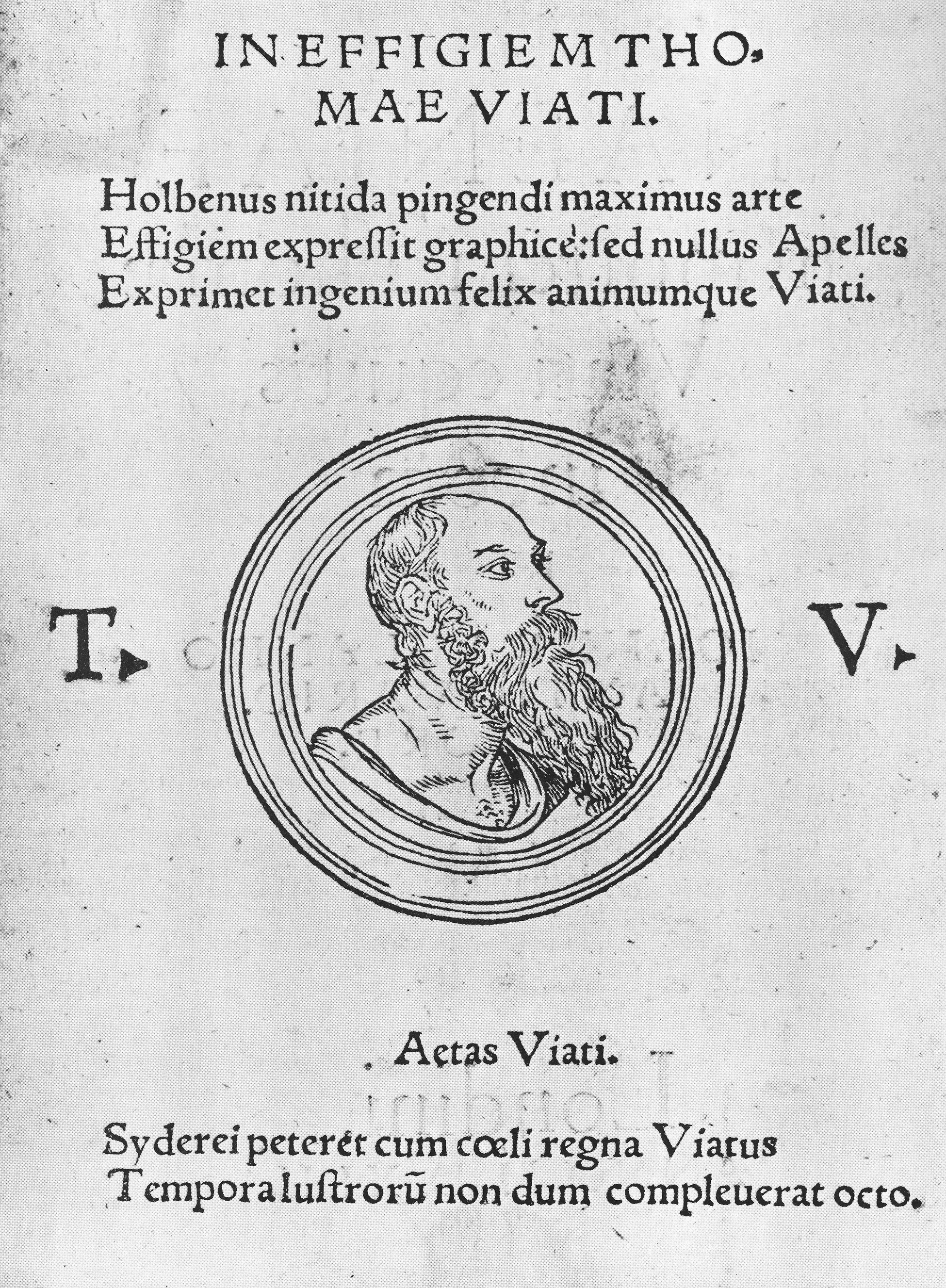
Woodcut by Hans Holbein the Younger from Leland's Naenia (1542), showing Sir Thomas Wyatt

=== Latin poetry ===
- Naeniae in mortem Thomæ Viati, equitis incomparabilis (1542). An elegy in praise of Sir Thomas Wyatt, written on his death.
- Genethliacon illustrissimi Eaduerdi principis Cambriae (1543). A poem inspired by the birth of Prince Edward (the future Edward VI) in 1537, and focusing on his titular dominions of Wales, Cornwall and Cheshire. A prose "Syllabus" (appendix) provides a commentary on its many topographical allusions.
- Three poems in celebration of the king's military achievements in France:
  - Fatum Bononiae Morinorum (1544), on the First Siege of Boulogne in 1544.
  - Bononia Gallo-mastix in laudem felicissimi victoris Henrici VIII (1545), also on the First Siege of Boulogne.
  - Laudatio pacis (1546).
- Naenia in mortem splendidissimi equitis Henrici Duddelegi (1545). An elegy in praise of Sir Henry Dudley.
- Κυκνειον άσμα: Cygnea cantio (1545). A long "river poem", which praises Henry VIII through the voice of a swan as it swims down the Thames from Oxford to Greenwich. An extensive prose "Commentarii" elucidates the poem's many place-name and topographical references.
- Principum, ac illustrium aliquot & eruditorum in Anglia virorum, encomia, trophæa, genethliaca, & epithalamia (1589), ed. Thomas Newton. Generally known as the Encomia, this is a collection of over 250 short poems in honour of Leland's contemporaries.

=== Antiquarian prose writings ===
Leland's prose writings, published and unpublished, include:

- Assertio inclytissimi Arturii regis Britanniae (1544). Leland's prose treatise on the historicity of King Arthur. Also published in English translation by Richard Robinson as A learned and true assertion of the original, life, actes, and death of the most noble, valiant, and renoumed Prince Arthure, King of great Brittaine (1582).
- "Antiphilarchia" (completed in 1541, unpublished). A religious dialogue, written in response to Albert Pighius' "Hierarchiæ ecclesiasticæ assertio" (Cologne, 1538). Leland's manuscript survives as Cambridge University Library MS Ee.5.14. His annotated copy of the Pighius work can be found in the collection of Worcester Cathedral now administered by the University of Birmingham.
- The "New Year's Gift" (c. 1544). A letter addressed to Henry VIII. Published by John Bale (with additional commentary) as The Laboryouse Journey (1549).
- "De uiris illustribus" (written c. 1535–36 and c. 1543–46). A biographical dictionary of famous British authors in chronological order. Leland did not live to complete the work. The manuscript is Bodleian Library MS Top. gen. c.4. It was published as Commentarii de scriptoribus Britannicis by Anthony Hall in 1709; and more authoritatively (and under its original title) by James Carley in 2010.
- "Antiquitates Britanniae". A compendium of extracts from classical and medieval texts relating to Britain. Now British Library Cotton MS Julius C.vi.
- The "Collectanea" (now Bodleian Library, MSS Top. gen. c.1–3; British Library Add. MS 38132). Leland's many notes and transcripts from his visits to monastic libraries, including most of his book-lists, compiled 1533–36. The three principal volumes were donated to the Bodleian by William Burton. First published in six volumes by Thomas Hearne in 1715, with revised editions appearing in 1770 and 1774. The third volume includes a copy of Ælfric's Glossary. Leland reports that at Malmesbury, he found a copy of a now lost work which he ascribed to William of Malmesbury, verses in 15 books on the four Evangelists.
- "Itinerary" notebooks (now Bodleian Library, MSS Top. gen. e.8–15; other fragments in British Library, or surviving only as later transcripts). Leland's topographical notes, compiled c. 1538–43. Of the Bodleian material, the first seven volumes were donated to the library by Burton, and the eighth and final one (a compilation of fragments) by Charles King c. 1693. First published by Thomas Hearne in 1710–12 (second edition 1744–45); and more authoritatively by Lucy Toulmin Smith in 1906–10.

Leland's writings are an invaluable primary source, not only for the local history and the geography of England, but also for literary history, archaeology, social history, and economic history.

== Editions of Leland's works ==
=== Collectanea ===
- Hearne, Thomas, ed. (1774). Joannis Lelandi Antiquarii De Rebus Britannicis Collectanea. 6 vols (3rd ed.). London.

=== Commentarii de Scriptoribus Britannicis ===
- Hall, Anthony, ed. (1708). Commentarii de Scriptoribus Britannicis, auctore Joanne Lelando Londinate. 2 vols. Oxford.

=== De uiris illustribus: On Famous Men ===
- Carley, James P., ed. (2010). De uiris illustribus: On Famous Men. Toronto and Oxford.

This is a new and authoritative edition (with English translation) of the work previously published by Hall as Commentarii de Scriptoribus Britannicis.

=== Itinerary (ed. Thomas Hearne, 9 vols.) ===
- Hearne, Thomas, ed. (1744–45). The Itinerary of John Leland the Antiquary (2nd ed.).
  - Vol. 1
  - Vol. 2
  - Vol. 3
  - Vol. 4
  - Vol. 5
  - Vol. 6
  - Vol. 7
  - Vol. 8
  - Vol. 9

=== Itinerary (ed. Lucy Toulmin Smith, 5 vols.) ===
- Toulmin Smith, Lucy (ed.), The Itinerary of John Leland in or about the years 1535–1543, Vol. 1, Containing Parts 1–3, with General Introduction, Portrait, and 2 Maps, London, 1907
- Toulmin Smith, Lucy (ed.), The Itinerary of John Leland in or about the years 1535–1543, Vol. 2, Containing Parts 4 & 5, with an Appendix of Extracts from Leland's Collectanea, and a Map, London, 1908.
- Toulmin Smith, Lucy (ed.), The Itinerary in Wales of John Leland in or about the years 1536–1539, Vol. 3 Containing Part 6 (The Itinerary in Wales), with a Map, London, 1906.
- Toulmin Smith, Lucy (ed.), The Itinerary of John Leland in or about the years 1535–1543, Vol. 4, Containing Parts 7 & 8 with Appendices including Extracts from Leland's Collectanea & 3 Maps, London, 1909.
- Toulmin Smith, Lucy (ed.), The Itinerary of John Leland in or about the years 1535–1543, Vol. 5, Containing Parts 9–11, Two Appendices, a Glossary and General Index, London, 1910.

=== Itinerary (ed. John Chandler) ===
- Chandler, John (ed.), John Leland's Itinerary: Travels in Tudor England, Gloucester: Sutton, 1993; revised edn. 1998; 2nd edn. Gloucester: Hobnob Press, 2022

This edition, based on Toulmin Smith's, rearranges Leland's topographical descriptions of England (with Wales added in the second edition) in county chapters, and renders them in modern English. It is less authoritative for scholarly purposes, but considerably more accessible and easier to navigate. It also corrects a small number of errors by Toulmin Smith.

=== Latin poetry ===
- Naeniae in Mortem Thomae Viati. Published by Dana F. Sutton with English translation in the Philological Museum as Naeniae in Mortem Thomae Viati.
- Genethliacon. Published by Dana F. Sutton with English translation in the Philological Museum under the title Pompa Nympharum.
- Bononia Gallo-mastix and Laudatio pacis. Published by Dana F. Sutton with English translation in the Philological Museum as Two Poems on the French War.
- Naenia in mortem splendidissimi equitis Henrici Duddelegi. Published by Dana F. Sutton with English translation in the Philological Museum as Naenia in mortem splendidissimi equitis Henrici Duddelegi.
- Cygnea Cantio. Published by Dana F. Sutton with English translation in the Philological Museum as Cygnea Cantio.
- Encomia. 28 of Leland's short poems from this collection are published with English translations by James Carley in "Leland in Paris" (1986). All 282 short poems are published by Dana F. Sutton with English translations in the Philological Museum under the title Epigrammata. Sutton publishes two longer masques from the collection separately as Two Latin Masques.

== Bibliography ==
- Carley, James P., ed. (2010). De uiris illustribus: On Famous Men. Toronto and Oxford: Pontifical Institute of Mediaeval Studies/Bodleian Library.

Carley's introduction to the above volume incorporates the fullest and most up-to-date information on Leland's life and work.

- Bradner, L. (1956). "Some unpublished poems by John Leland". Proceedings of the Modern Language Association of America. 71 (4): 827–36. doi:10.2307/460645. JSTOR 460645. S2CID 163264560.
- Brett, Caroline (1990). "John Leland, Wales, and Early British History". Welsh History Review. 15: 169–82.
- Buckalew, R. E. (1978). "Leland's Transcript of Ælfric's Glossary". Anglo-Saxon England. 7: 149–64. doi:10.1017/s026367510000291x.
- Burton, Edward (1896). The Life of John Leland. London.
- Carley, James P. (1983). "John Leland's Cygnea Cantio: a neglected Tudor river poem". Humanistica Lovaniensia. 32: 225–41.
- Carley, James P. (1985). "The Manuscript Remains of John Leland: 'The king's antiquary'". Text: Transactions of the Society for Textual Scholarship. 2: 111–20.
- Carley, James P. (1986). "John Leland in Paris: The Evidence of his Poetry". Studies in Philology. 83: 1–50.
- Carley, James P. (1986). "John Leland and the Contents of the English Pre-Dissolution Libraries: The Cambridge Friars". Transactions of the Cambridge Bibliographical Society. 9 (1): 90–100.
- Carley, James P. (1989). "John Leland and the Contents of the English Pre-Dissolution Libraries: Lincolnshire". Transactions of the Cambridge Bibliographical Society. 9 (4): 330–57.
- Carley, James P. (1996). "Polydore Vergil and John Leland on King Arthur: the Battle of the Books"". In Kennedy, E. D. (ed.). King Arthur: a Casebook. New York: Garland. pp. 185–204.
- Carley, James P.; Petitmengin, Pierre (2004). "Pre-Conquest Manuscripts from Malmesbury Abbey and John Leland's Letter to Beatus Rhenanus Concerning a Lost Copy of Tertullian's Works". Anglo-Saxon England. 33: 195–223. doi:10.1017/s0263675104000079. S2CID 162208794.
- Carley, James P. (2006) [2004]. "Leland, John (c.1503–1552)". Oxford Dictionary of National Biography (online ed.). Oxford University Press. doi:10.1093/ref:odnb/16416. (Subscription, Wikipedia Library access or UK public library membership required.)
- Chandler, John (1996). "John Leland in the West Country". In Brayshay, Mark (ed.). Topographical Writers in South-West England. Exeter: University of Exeter Press. pp. 34–49.
- Chisholm, Hugh, ed. (1911). "Leland, John (antiquary)" . Encyclopædia Britannica. Vol. 16 (11th ed.). Cambridge University Press. pp. 405–406.
- Fritze, Ronald Harold. “‘Truth Hath Lacked Witnesse, Tyme Wanted Light’: The Dispersal of the English Monastic Libraries and Protestant Efforts at Preservation, ca. 1535-1625.” The Journal of Library History 18, no. 3 (1983): 274–91.
- Harris, Oliver (2005). "'Motheaten, Mouldye, and Rotten': the Early Custodial History and Dissemination of John Leland's Manuscript Remains". Bodleian Library Record. 18 (5): 460–501. doi:10.3828/blr.2005.18.5.460.
- Harris, Oliver (2007). "John Leland and the 'Briton Brykes'". Antiquaries Journal. 87: 346–56. doi:10.1017/s0003581500000949. S2CID 161720289.
- Lee, John S. (2010). "The functions and fortunes of English small towns at the close of the Middle Ages: evidence from John Leland's Itinerary". Urban History. 37: 3–25. doi:10.1017/S0963926810000040. S2CID 146752587.
- Momigliano, Arnaldo (1950). "Ancient History and the Antiquarian". Journal of the Warburg and Courtauld Institutes. 13 (3/4): 285–315. doi:10.2307/750215. JSTOR 750215. S2CID 164918925.
- Shrank, Cathy (2004). Writing the Nation in Reformation England 1530–1580. Oxford: Oxford University Press. ISBN 0199268886.
- Skeat, T. C. (1950). "Two 'Lost' Works by John Leland". English Historical Review. 65: 505–8. doi:10.1093/ehr/lxv.cclvii.505.
- Summit, Jennifer (2007). "Leland's Itinerary and the remains of the medieval past". In McMullan, Gordon; Matthews, David (eds.). Reading the Medieval in Early Modern England. Cambridge: Cambridge University Press. pp. 159–76. ISBN 9780521868433.
