= Thomas Cox (topographer) =

English clergyman, topographer and translator

Thomas Cox (1655? – 1734) was an English clergyman, topographer and translator.

== Life ==
A Master of Arts, he became rector of Chignal-Smealy, near Chelmsford, on 19 June 1680, and continued there until 1704. He was next preferred to the vicarage of Broomfield, Essex, on 11 February 1685, and to the rectory of Stock-Harvard in the same county on 24 February 1703; these livings he held until his death. He was also lecturer of St. Michael's, Cornhill, but resigned the appointment in 1730.

Cox died on 11 January 1734.

== Works ==
Besides an assize sermon, The Influence of Religion in the Administration of Justice, London, 1726, Cox published anonymously translations of two works of Louis Ellies-Dupin, which he entitled The Evangelical History, with additions, London, 1694 (third edition, London, 1703–7), and A Compendious History of the Church, second edition, 4 vols., London, 1716–15. He also translated Plutarch's Morals by way of Abstract done from the Greek, London, 1707, and Panciroli's History of many Memorable Things Lost, 2 vols., London, 1715 (with new title-page, London, 1727). The lives of Richard II, Henry IV, Henry V, and Henry VI in White Kennett's Complete History of England are also by him.

Cox's major work was Magna Britannia (this identification from the British Museum Catalogue has been queried, however). Richard Gough said that this work was originally published in monthly numbers as a supplement to the five volumes of Atlas Geographus (Herman Moll, 1711–17). It contains only the English counties. The introduction or account of the ancient state of Britain was written by Dr. Anthony Hall, who also contributed the account of Berkshire. Prefixed to each county is a map by Robert Morden. The publisher was Elizabeth Nutt.

== Family ==
Cox married Love, fifth daughter of Thomas Manwood of Lincoln's Inn and Priors in Broomfield, Essex. Their son, Thomas, besides succeeding his father in the rectory of Stock, was rector of Chignal-Smealy (1714–1735), and rector of Ramsden-Bellhouse (27 September 1733), and died on 26 July 1763.
