= Panciroli =

Panciroli is an uncommon Italian surname that may refer to:

- Guido Panciroli (1523-1599), Italian jurist and historian
- Giovanni Giacomo Panciroli (1587-1651), Italian Catholic Cardinal and Cardinal Secretary of State
- Jacques Panciroli (b. 1931), French bobsledder
- Romeo Panciroli (1923-2006), Vatican spokesperson and diplomat
