= Bridgwater Town Council =

Local authority of Bridgwater, Somerset, England

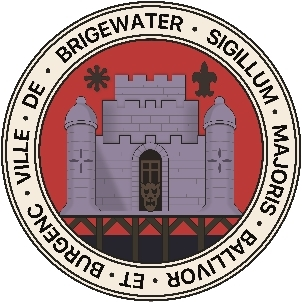

Type
- Type: Town Council of the Civil Parish of Bridgwater

Leadership
- Town Mayor: Mick Lerry, Labour
- Leader: Brian Smedley, Labour

Structure
- Seats: 16 town councillors
- Political groups: Labour (11) Conservative (4) Independent (1)

Elections
- Voting system: First past the post
- Last election: 5 May 2022
- Next election: 7 May 2026

Meeting place
- Bridgwater Town Hall

Website
- bridgwater-tc.gov.uk

Bridgwater Town Council is a parish level authority in Bridgwater, Somerset, England. It owns and administers Bridgwater Town Hall, the Blake Museum and the adjacent historic Bridgwater Town Mill, and awards grants.

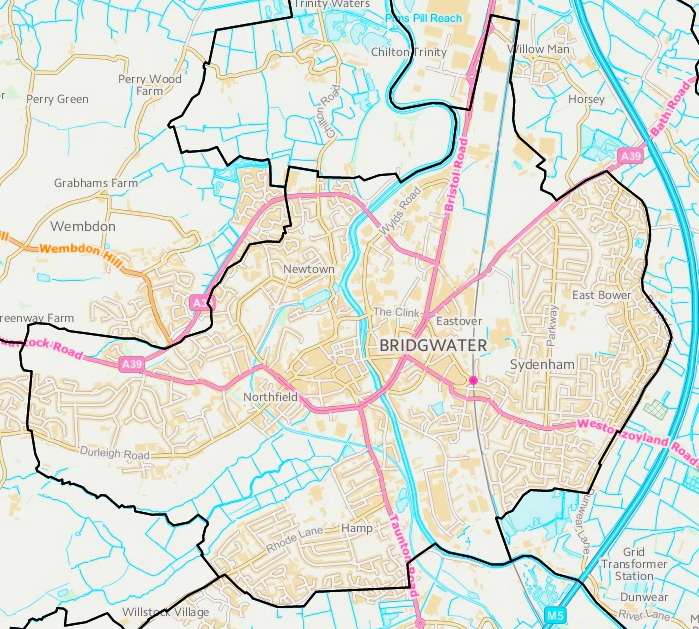
The area of the town

== History ==
Following the implementation of Local Government Act 1972 in March 1974, Bridgwater Borough Council was abolished, and charter trustees were created, drawn from the 16 councillors elected to Sedgemoor District Council in Somerset, England, that represented the borough wards, who maintained the continuity of the town's legal status until such time as a parish council was established. Duties were limited to ceremonial activities. In Bridgwater's case this extended to being responsible for the town's charters, muniments and historic silver.

Bridgwater Town Council was created in 2003, with sixteen elected members representing six wards of the town – Bower (three); Eastover (two); Hamp (three); Quantock (three); Sydenham (three) and Victoria (two). The wards were changed in 2011 to Westover (three); Hamp (two); Wyndham (two); Victoria (two); Eastover (two); Fairfax west (one); Fairfax east (two); Dunwear north (one) and Dunwear south (one).

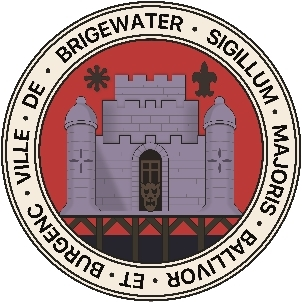
The council's seal

The council's seal has been used by the Mayor, Bailiffs and Burgesses of the town since the Middle Ages.

Bridgwater Town Council owns Bridgwater Town Hall, which houses the Town Clerk's office, Mayor's Parlour, Charter Hall and meeting rooms and a new suite of additional offices plus numerous offices hired out to the community. The Town Hall main rooms have been restored, and some are available for hire.

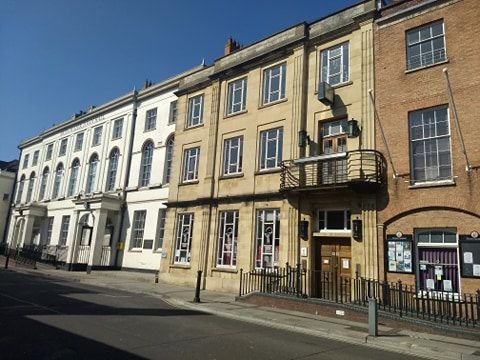
The Town Hall, Bridgwater

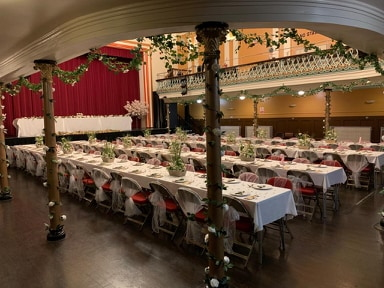
The Theatre set up for a function

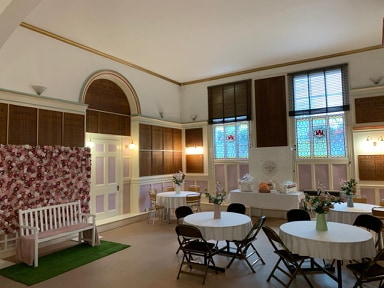
The Charter Hall set up for a function

It owns and administers the Blake Museum, and the adjacent historic Bridgwater Town Mill These are administered by joint committee of councillors and volunteer members of the Friends of Blake Museum, who do the day-to-day management. Trinity Hall is leased to On Your Bike, a local charity that trains people to refurbish bicycle and learn skills.

The council gives financial support to the Victoria Park and Sydenham Community centres and the Hamp Community Association. It gives financial support to Bridgwater Arts Centre, and in May 2020 it took over the ownership of the Arts Centre from Sedgemoor District Council.

The town has international links with La Ciotat (France), 1957; Homberg (Efze) (Germany), 1992; Uherské Hradiště (Czech Republic), 1992; Marsa (Malta) 2006; Priverno (Italy) 2015; Seattle (United States) 2015 and Camacha, Madeira, (Portugal) 2019.

== Wards and councillors ==
Since 2011 Bridgwater is divided into eightWards, each represented by one to three town councillors. Elections are held every four years on the same day of that year's local elections, with the most recent being on 5 May 2022. In these elections all seats on the council are contested. Following the 2022 election's results and subsequent by-elections the current composition of councillors is:

Current town council
Ward	Councillor	Party
Dunwear North Ward	Dave Loveridge	Labour
Dunwear South Ward	Suria Aujla	Conservative
Eastover Ward	Tony Heywood	Labour
Eastover Ward	Jacqui Solomon	Labour
Fairfax Ward	Irena Hubble	Labour
Fairfax Ward	Richard Morgan	Independent
Fairfax Ward	Diogo Rodrigues	Conservative
Hamp Ward	Liz Leavy	Labour
Hamp Ward	Leigh Redman	Labour
Victoria Ward	Mick Lerry	Labour
Victoria Ward	Liz Marsh	Labour
Westover Ward	Tim Mander	Labour
Westover Ward	Kathy Pearce	Labour
Westover Ward	Brian Smedley	Labour
Hamp Ward	Rachel Lilley	Conservative
Hamp Ward	Gill Slocombe	Conservative

== Town-wide grants ==
The council's two grant schemes are for one-off grants up to £2,500 for community groups. One is ring-fenced for grants in wards; the other is for town-wide community groups with heritage, cultural and social aims, such as the Friends of Wembdon Road Cemetery, a group which is restoring a closed Victorian cemetery.

The council funds with £7,000 the Quayside festival in the summer via the Bridgwater Cultural partnership.

In the winter it sponsors a Bridgwater History Day when various talks are given on aspects of the town's past.

Youth grants – These total £10,000 per year and applications are decided by a 'Youth Forum' drawn from the schools.

Twinning grants – These total c.£2,500 per year, of which £300 goes as general running to the 6 twinning organisations and the remainder on an annual twinning week.

== Other Links ==
- Blake Museum
- John Chubb (artist)
- Bridgwater Town Mill
- Bridgwater Arts Centre
