= Bridgwater Friary =

Dissolved monastery in Somerset, England

Coordinates: 51.1252°N 3.0071°W

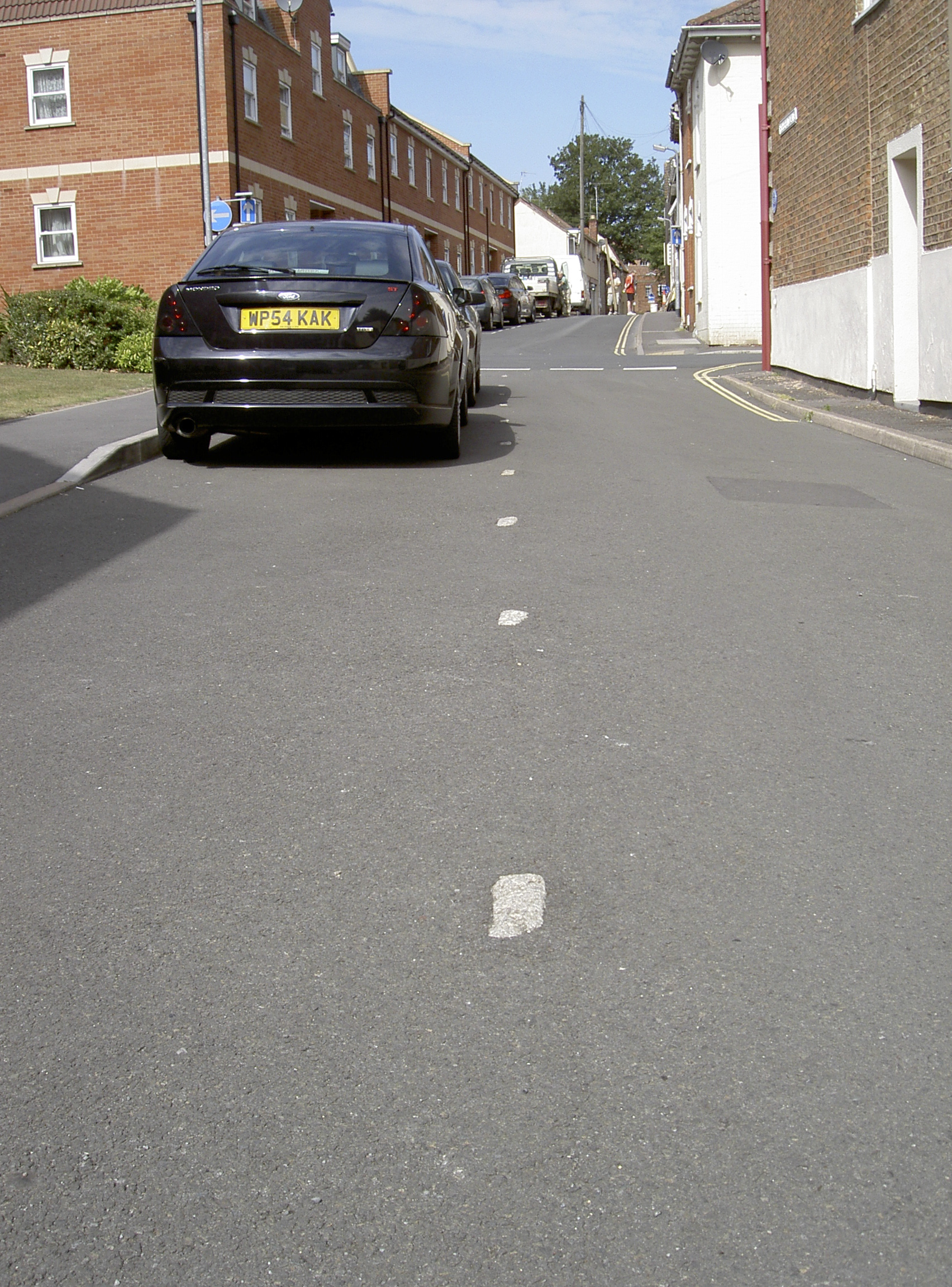
- A dotted line on the road marks the boundary of the friary

Monastery information
- Order: Franciscan
- Established: 1245
- Disestablished: 1538

People
- Founder(s): William Briwere

Site
- Location: Bridgwater, Somerset, England
- Grid reference: ST297368

Bridgwater Friary shown within Somerset
(grid reference ST297368)

Bridgwater Friary was a Franciscan monastery in Bridgwater, Somerset, England, established in 1245 and dissolved in 1538.

It was founded by William Briwere and moved from another location. Further buildings were added in 1278 and 1284. The church was rebuilt in the 15th century and consecrated in 1445. After the dissolution of the monasteries it became a mansion house. There have been various attempts to excavated the site with decorated tiles, and other building fragments now in the Blake Museum. The only visible remains are an old door in Silver Street.

The site is also crossed by a linear feature thought to date from the English Civil War.
