= Bridgwater Town Mill =

Coordinates: 51°07′37″N 3°00′06″W

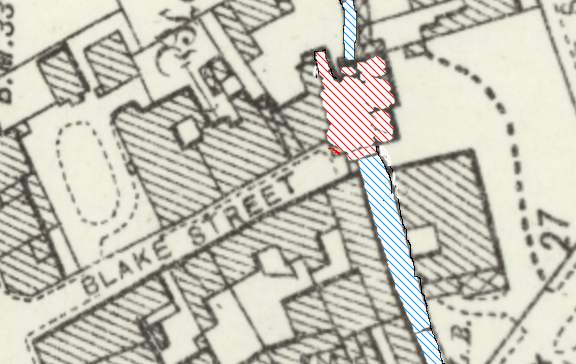
Location map of the mill in Blake Street

The Bridgwater Town Mill is at the end of Blake Street, Bridgwater, England, next to the Blake Museum. It is fed by the Durleigh Brook, which discharges into the River Parrett through St Saviour's Clyse. It dates from the Middle Ages and later known as the Lytel Mill, and ground corn for the town. It is a Grade II listed building.

It was mentioned in the Domesday Book, 1086, in a list of the town's resources, with a value of 5 shillings.

It was also mentioned in various Bridgwater Borough documents between 1361 and 1380 and again in 1413.

It featured in the Borough's royal charter of Elizabeth: Elizabeth I. 4 July 1587

And in consideration of the promises and for the great Gratuity by us unto the Inhabitants of the said Borough bestowed we will and Rightly enjoyne and command the Mayor, Recorder and Aldermen of the said Borough that neither they nor any of them from henceforth forever do suffer or allow any persons or persons being inhabitants of the said Borough, Suburbs or Precincts to utter or sell any ale or Beer within the said Borough or to exercise the Art Mystery or Offices of a Brewer or Brewers within the said Borough Liberties or precincts thereof, but only such as from time to time do Grind or cause to be Ground all and all manner of Corne, Malt and Grain at our Mills called the Little Mills in or near Bridgwater aforesaid, the ministers of us our Heirs and Successors, or the Ministers or Millers of the Tenants or Farmers of us our Heirs and Successors for the time being assigned or appointed there for Grinding the same Grain and Malt and Corn if the same Farmers or Millars may or can conveniently or in reasonable time Dispatch or do the same, taking such and like reasonable Tolne [Toll], as on Old times the t have used and ought to do.

In 1694 it was converted to pump water from the brook to a cistern under town's High Cross on Cornhill, from where hawkers carried water to the inhabitants. Bored elm pipes were installed below the streets, many of which have been dug up during roadworks over the years. The work was undertaken by Richard Lowbridge, a Stourbridge ironmonger, and Daniel Dunnett, a carpenter, who was perhaps responsible for the construction of the machinery. They established waterworks at Exeter and Barnstaple at about the same time.

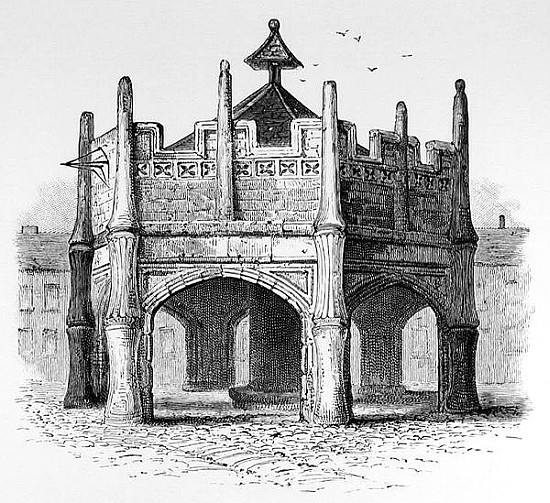
The High Cross on Cornhill, demolished c 1800

At the beginning of the nineteenth century the High Cross was demolished, and the town did not have a proper water supply until the 1870s, when the Borough Council built the Ashford Waterworks.

The Mill was offered for sale in April 1804. It had a 15 feet (4.6 m) diameter breast-shot wheel, but very little is known about the machinery used. The surviving nineteenth-century gearing indicates the millstones were on the upper floor,

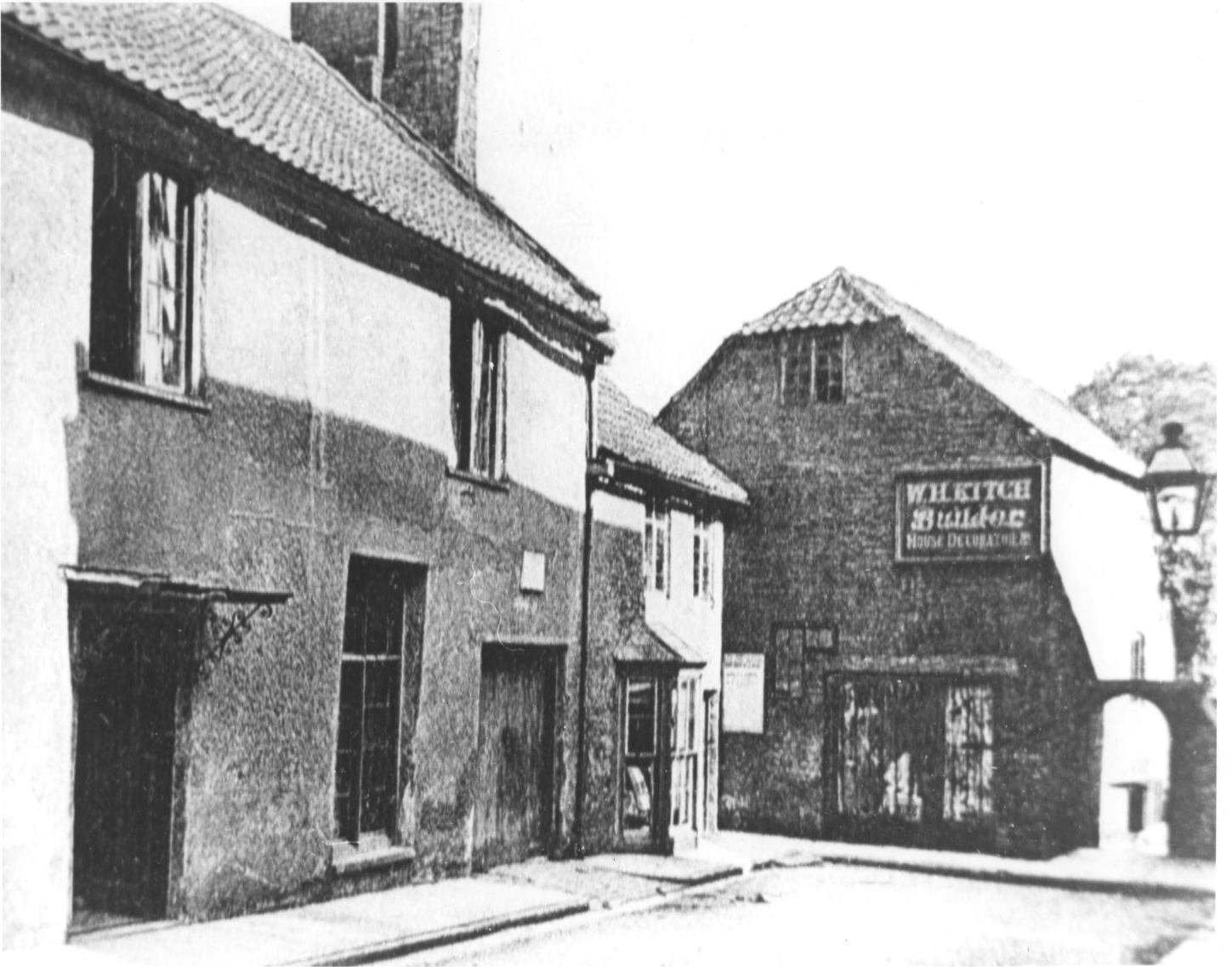
The Mill, c 1920. The building to the left later became the Blake Museum.

It was used during the nineteenth century as a corn mill and in 1858 converted to steam power for which an extension was built housing the engine and boiler with its chimney. A broadside advertising the mill for rent, published c1860 noted that there was at 10 HP steam engine and 3 pairs of mill stones. Soon after it became a saw mill. It became unused by the end of the C19, and then occupied by a builder who was also the Borough's Weights and Measures inspector. Between c1920-c1940 it housed a firm making wicker furniture, which was an extensive local trade then. It was then used by a local builder, and during the second world war was a distribution centre for Civil Defence.

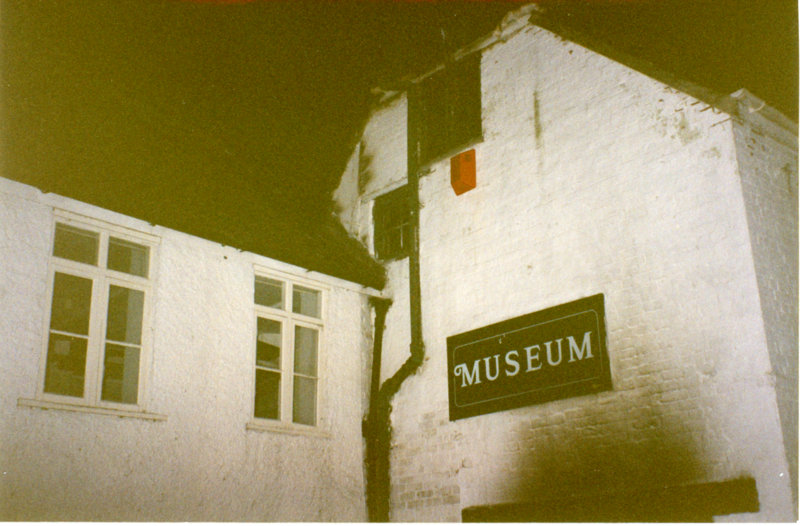
Smoke damage after the fire, June 1995

It came on the market in 1987 and was purchased by the Bridgwater Museum Development Trust as an extension to the Blake Museum. An archaeological survey was done, and architect's plans made to restore the mill and incorporate it into the museum, but it was damaged by fire in 1995 before work could begin and most of the roof and upper floor of the main mill were destroyed. Part of the roof of the end of the museum was damaged, and a number of the paintings by John Chubb suffered smoke damage and required conservation.

The mill was subsequently bought by Sedgemoor District Council and as a safety measure the Council dropped the upper walls of the damaged part, leaving them standing to first-floor level. The museum was transferred to the Bridgwater Town Council in 2009 and is managed now by volunteers. They cleared the rubble from inside and refurbished the roof of the standing portion, so space could be used as storage for the museum's collection of artefacts recovered from archaeological excavations. Later, a wooden floor was inserted over the cellar area of the main mill so ready access to the building could be had from the street.

The Bridgwater Town Council authorised a project in 2017 to restore the main mill to its original profile and also the wheel, and the designs and estimates are being prepared. The work is being organised by the Friends of Blake Museum. When finished it will be a valuable addition to the facilities of the museum and the town.
