= Sedgemoor Splash =

Water park in Bridgwater, Somerset, England

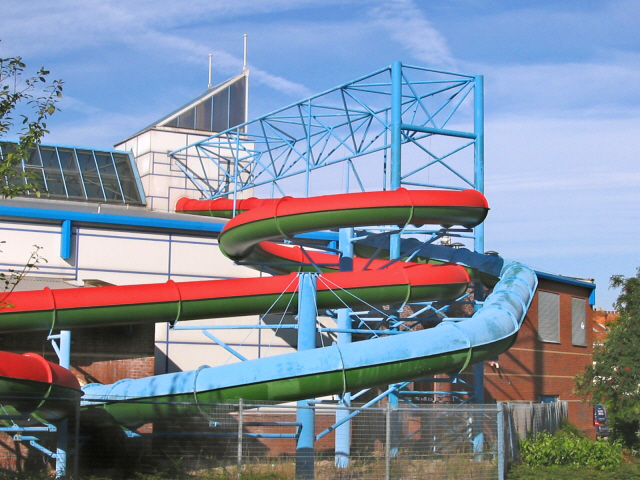
Sedgemoor Splash water slides

Sedgemoor Splash was an indoor water park in Bridgwater, Somerset.

It was opened by Diana, Princess of Wales in 1991 and closed in August 2009 during the late 2000s recession.
