= Corn Exchange, Bridgwater =

Commercial building in Bridgwater, Somerset, England

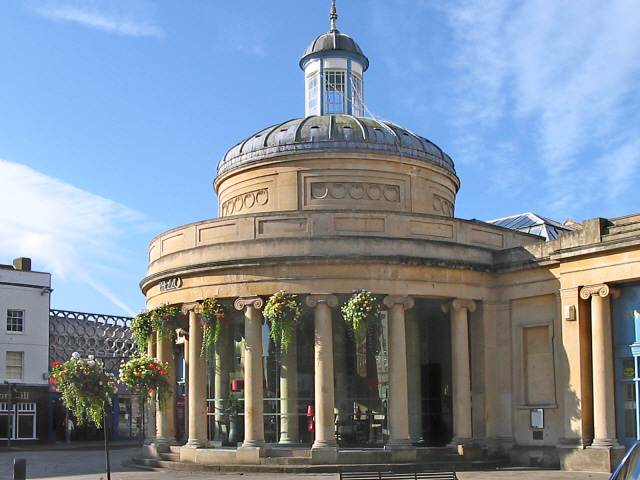
- Corn Exchange, Bridgewater

- Shown in Somerset
- 51.1283°N 3.0041°W
- Location: Cornhill, Bridgwater

History
- Built: 1834

Site notes
- Architect: John Bowen
- Architectural style: Neoclassical style

Listed Building – Grade I
- Official name: Corn Exchange and attached railings, market House and attached railings
- Designated: 24 March 1950
- Reference no.: 1205740

The Corn Exchange is a commercial building in Cornhill, Bridgwater, Somerset, England. The structure, which is now used as a chain restaurant, is a Grade I listed building.

== History ==
As early as the 14th century, there was a shambles for the sale of farm products on Cornhill. In the late 18th century, local merchants decided to commission a purpose-built "corn market": this was a rectangular structure built in brick and completed in 1791.

After the north and south sides of the corn market were demolished to facilitate road widening in 1825, the building was remodelled, to a design by John Bowen in the neoclassical style, and encased in ashlar stone in 1834. The design involved a symmetrical main frontage of three bays onto Cornhill. The central bay featured a prominent circular portico formed by a colonnade of Ionic order columns supporting an entablature, a cornice, and a parapet. The portico was surmounted by a drum-shaped structure, with panels decorated by paterae, topped by a dome, a hexagonal roof lantern and a finial. The finial incorporated a finely carved pineapple in its design. The outer bays, which were slightly projected forward, contained openings flanked by Ionic order columns in antis supporting an entablature and a parapet. The architectural historian, Nikolaus Pevsner, was impressed with the design which he described as "just right in scale and modest formality for a county town of some pride and traditions".

The market hall behind was extended to the west, to a design by Charles Knowles, in 1875. Railings, which originally surrounded the building to separate the livestock from the food produce, were removed in 1895. A statue of the 17th-century naval commander Robert Blake, who was born in the town, was designed by F. W. Pomeroy and installed in front of the building in 1900. However, the use of the building as a corn exchange declined significantly in the wake of the Great Depression of British Agriculture in the late 19th century.

A major programme of refurbishment works, which allowed additional retail units to be introduced into the complex, was completed in 1985, and the statue of Blake was moved further to the east, as part of a pedestrianisation scheme, at that time. A chain restaurant was established in the building in the early 21st century.

== See also ==
- Corn exchanges in England
- Grade I listed buildings in Sedgemoor
