= Blake Statue =

Statue in Bridgwater, Somerset, England

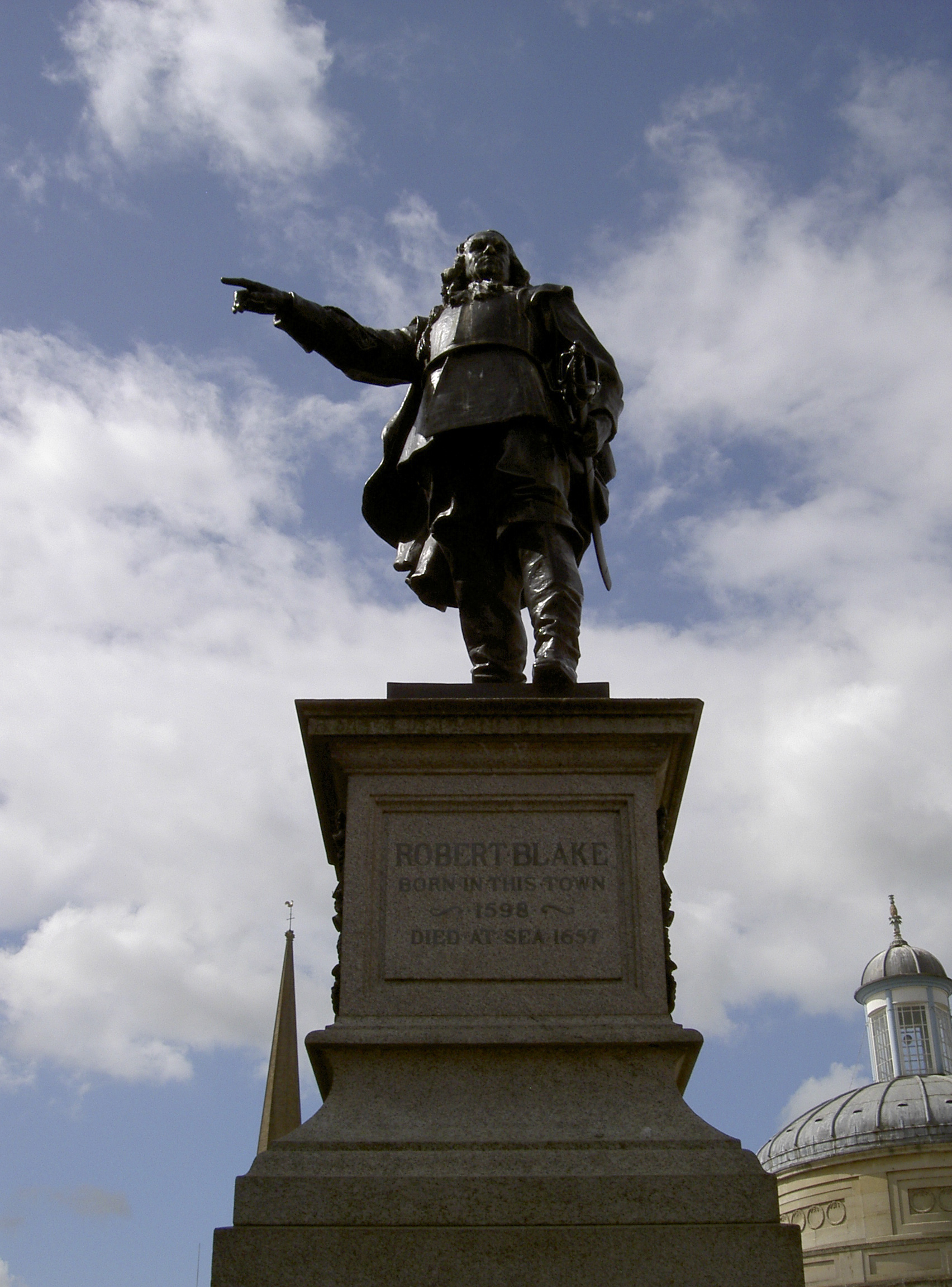

- Artist: F. W. Pomeroy
- Completion date: 1900
- Medium: Bronze
- Subject: Robert Blake
- Location: Bridgwater, Somerset, England
- 51.1284°N 3.0036°W

The Blake Statue in Bridgwater, Somerset, England was unveiled in 1900 to commemorate naval commander Robert Blake. The hollow bronze life size sculpture was crafted by F. W. Pomeroy. It is a Grade II* listed building.

== History ==
The hollow Bronze, statue was made by F. W. Pomeroy at a cost of £1,200. It was unveiled in 1900 by Lord Brassey. Pomeroy was a prolific British sculptor of architectural and monumental works. He was one of the so-called New Sculptors identified by Edmund Gosse in 1894 – a group distinguished by a stylistic turn towards naturalism and their work in architectural sculpture.

It was erected to commemorate the 300th anniversary of the birth of Robert Blake. £1,200 had been raised from public donation to fund the statue. Blake was one of the most important military commanders of the Commonwealth of England and one of the most famous English admirals of the 17th century. He was elected as the Member of Parliament for Bridgwater in the Short Parliament. When the English Civil War broke out during the period of the Long Parliament, and having failed to be re-elected, Blake began his military career on the side of the parliamentarians despite having no substantial experience of military or naval matters. Blake was appointed general at sea in 1649, serving in the First Anglo-Dutch War and Anglo-Spanish War. Later he was made Lord Warden of the Cinque Ports.

The statue was moved to its current site in 1986 having previously stood in front of the Corn Exchange.

== Architecture ==
The hollow bronze statue depicts Blake dressed as a parliamentary soldier with his right arm outstretched and with a sword in his left hand.

The brick dais is surrounded by granite steps. The inscription on the front of the plinth says "Robert Blake born in this town 1598 died at sea 1657". The other three sides record his naval victories.
