= Castle House, Bridgwater =

Castle House
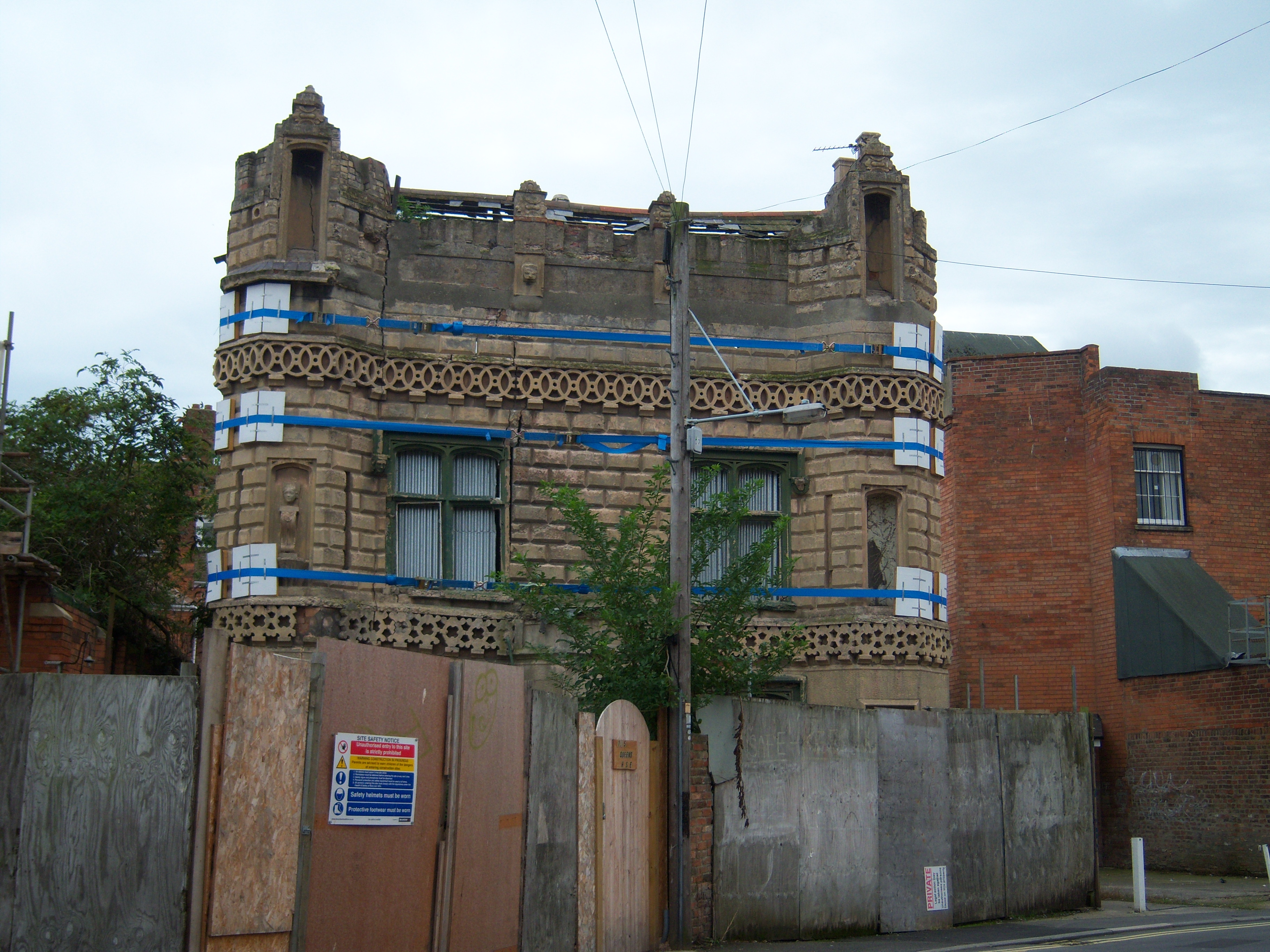

- Location within Somerset
- 51°07′45″N 3°00′08″W
- Location: Bridgwater, Somerset, England

History
- Built: 1851

Listed Building – Grade II*
- Official name: Castle House
- Designated: 16 December 1974
- Reference no.: 1355168

Castle House is a house in Bridgwater, Somerset, England. Castle House is associated with two important Sedgemoor families, the Boards and the Ackermans; John Board (1802-1861) who extended his family's brick company into cement in 1844, and his grandson William Ackerman who joined the company in 1871 and is credited with the first ‘true’ Portland cement.’ Built in 1851 to resemble a Tudor gatehouse, the construction uses panels of prefabricated concrete, with significant further usage of concrete throughout the building.

== Building ==
The house was built in 1851 for William Ackerman. Much of the building is made of brick but it was one of the first buildings to make extensive use of Portland cement for pre-cast concrete. The house is two storeys high and designed to look like an ornate Tudor gatehouse. Bays to the sides of the building form stairwells. The building includes many ornamental, and some structural uses of concrete demonstrating "an innovative interpretation of traditional masonry features in concrete". It was designated as a Grade II* listed building on 16 December 1974. Inside, the building includes more concrete features, such as the staircase, the handrails and the window frames.

== Renovation ==
Castle House was a finalist in the 2nd BBC television series Restoration in 2004 and was supported by friends of Joe Strummer.

It is included in the Heritage at Risk Register produced by English Heritage, and English Heritage provided funding for the restoration project.

In 2012 a grant of £300,000 was made by NNB Generation Company (part of Électricité de France) as part of monies paid to the local community for the development of Hinkley Point C nuclear power station to the SAVE Trust for the restoration of Castle House. It was planned to transfer the building to the Bridgwater carnival once restoration was complete.

In 2018 the scaffolding was finally removed as restoration of the façade was completed. Planning permission to convert the building into three flats had been obtained.
