= Bridgwater Town Hall =

Municipal building in Bridgwater, Somerset, England

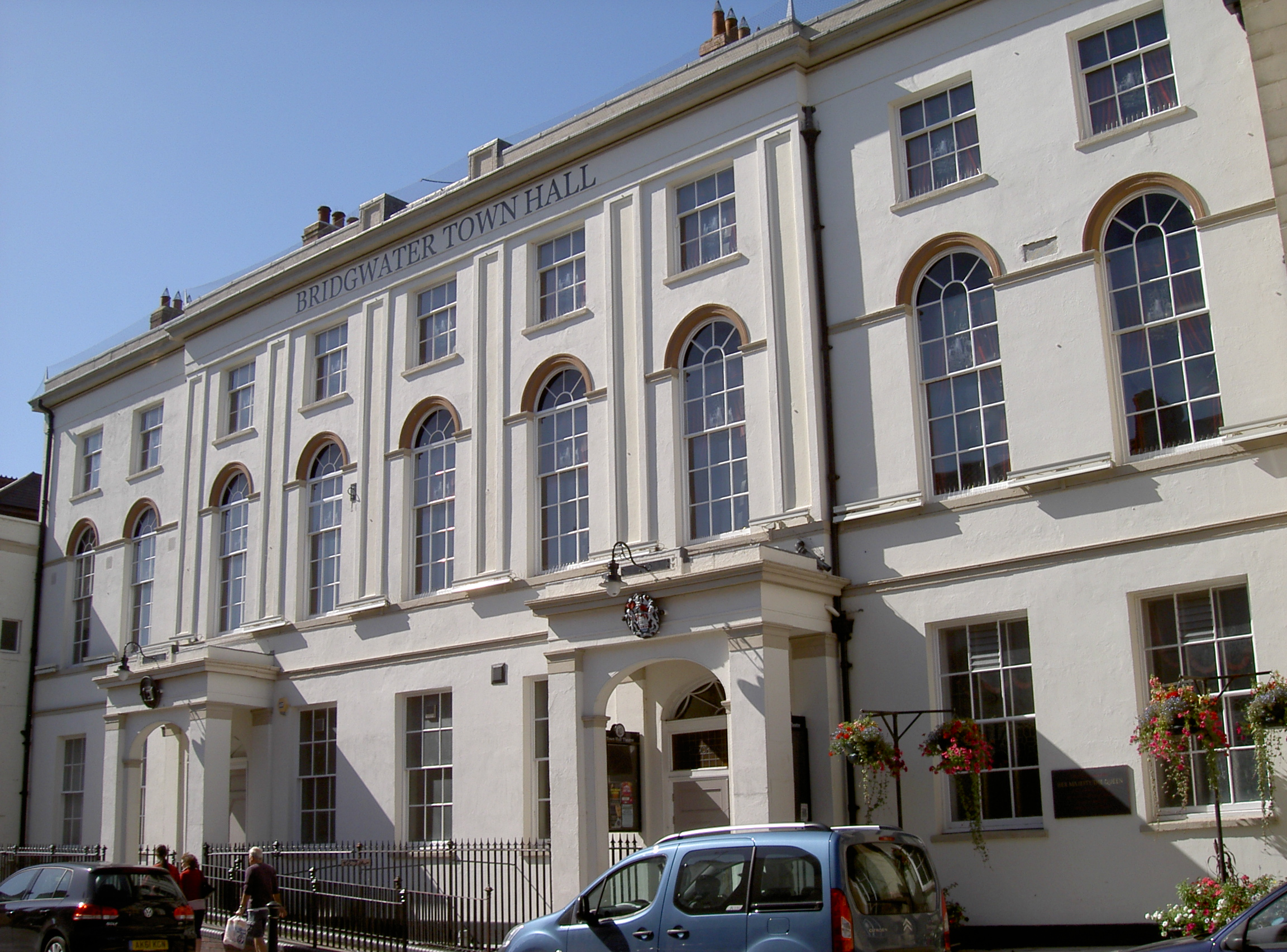
- Bridgwater Town Hall

- Shown in Somerset
- 51.1281°N 3.0062°W
- Location: High Street, Bridgwater

History
- Built: 1823 (High Street building); 1865 (Clare Street building)

Site notes
- Architect(s): Richard Carver and Charles Knowles
- Architectural style: Regency style

Listed Building – Grade II
- Official name: Bridgwater Town Hall and Attached Railings
- Designated: 24 March 1950
- Reference no.: 1280140

Bridgwater Town Hall is a municipal building in the High Street, Bridgwater, Somerset, England. The town hall, which is the headquarters of Bridgwater Town Council, is a Grade II listed building.

== History ==
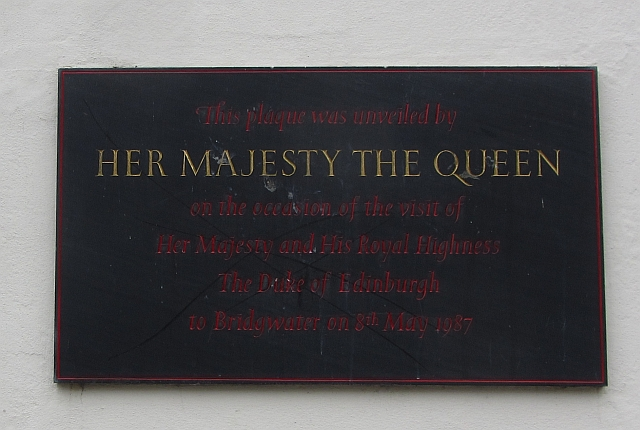
Plaque commemorating the visit of Queen Elizabeth II, accompanied by the Duke of Edinburgh, on 8 May 1987

The first municipal building in Bridgwater was the guildhall in Fore Street which dated back to the mid-14th century. It included a council chamber, a sergeant's room and a small room for records. (Note: After becoming dilapidated, the old guildhall was demolished in the 1820s.) Meanwhile, an assize hall was built in Penel Orlieu, later known as Clare Street, for the purpose of holding the regular meetings of the courts of assize, in 1720.

In the early 1820s, civic leaders formed an improvement committee which included the local member of parliament, Sir Thomas Lethbridge, whose family seat was at Sandhill Park, with the objective of financing a new municipal building. The new building was designed by Richard Carver in the Regency style, built in brick with a stucco façade and was completed in 1823. The design involved a symmetrical main frontage with nine bays facing onto the High Street; the central section of five bays, which slightly projected forward, featured two porticos each with Tuscan order columns supporting entablatures; the seal of the town council was installed on the entablature on the left portico while the borough coat of arms was installed on the right one. There were round headed sash windows flanked by pilasters on the first floor and square sash windows on the second floor. At roof level there was a cornice bearing the words "Bridgwater Town Hall". Internally, the principal rooms were the council chamber on the first floor and the charter hall on the ground floor. The assizes ceased to be held in Bridgwater in 1853, freeing up part of the building for alternative use: a free library and a reading room were established in the building.

In the mid-1860s the old assize hall on Clare Street was demolished and replaced by a new concert hall structure, which was conceived as a rear extension to the main High Street building. This rear building was designed by Charles Knowles in the Gothic style, built in red brick with stone dressings and officially opened in July 1865. The design involved a symmetrical main frontage with seven bays facing onto Clare Street; it featured red sandstone rubble with rusticated quoins on the ground floor and recesses with semi-circular stone archivolts on the first floor. The building was accessed up steep steps on the side elevations. A stage and a proscenium arch were added later. After the trade unionists of Bridgwater's brick and tile industry went on strike in July 1896, the concert hall was used as an assembly point for the police and the troops from the Gloucestershire Regiment: the Salisbury government read the Riot Act to the strikers and then sent the troops into the town to clear the barricades by force.

The town continued to serve as an events and concert venue and performers included the band, The Who, in April 1965. It also continued to serve as the borough headquarters for much of the 20th century but ceased to be the local seat of government after the enlarged Sedgemoor District Council was formed with its offices at The Priory in St Mary Street in 1974. Queen Elizabeth II, accompanied by the Duke of Edinburgh, visited the town hall and unveiled a plaque on 8 May 1987. The town hall resumed its municipal role as the meeting place of Bridgwater Town Council when it was formed in 2003.

Works of art in the town hall include a painting by an artist of the Italian School depicting Christ's Descent from the Cross which was presented to the town by Lord Poulett.
