= Blake Museum =

Museum in Bridgwater, England

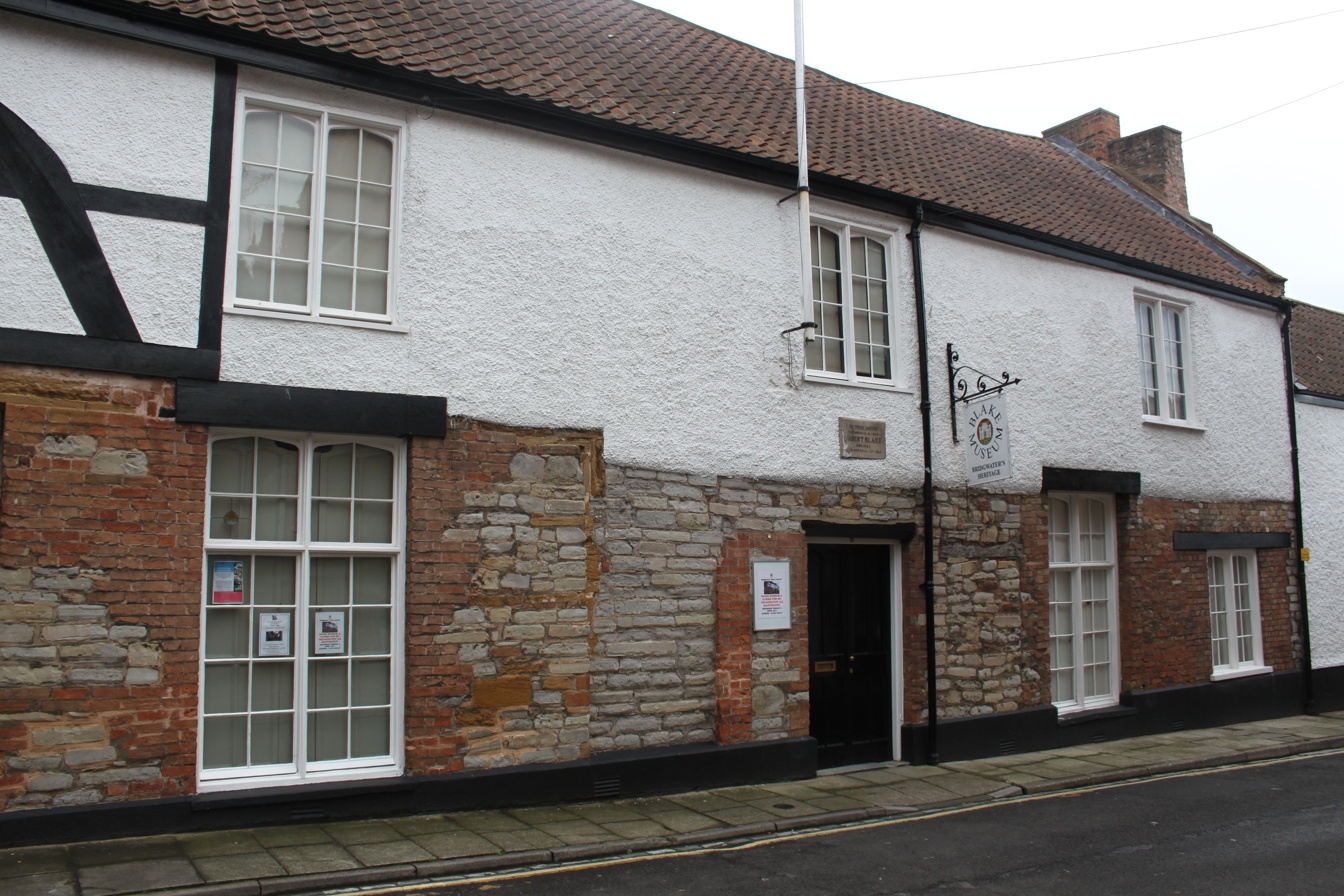
- The Blake Museum at 5 Blake Street, Bridgwater

- Location within Somerset and England
- Location: Bridgwater, Somerset
- Coordinates: 51°07′38″N 3°00′05″W
- Website: www.bridgwatermuseum.org.uk

Listed Building – Grade II*
- Official name: Admiral Blake Museum
- Designated: 24 March 1950
- Reference no.: 1205363

The Blake Museum is in Bridgwater, Somerset, England at what is believed to be the birthplace of Robert Blake, General at Sea (1598–1657). Since April 2009 it has been run by Bridgwater Town Council with help from the Friends of Blake Museum. It has been an Accredited Museum since 2006. It is next door to the Bridgwater Town Mill, and there are plans to develop this as an extension of the museum.

== History of the building ==
The building is believed to be the birthplace of Robert Blake, General at Sea. It was built in the late 15th or early 16th century, and has been designated by English Heritage as a grade II* listed building. The three-storey two-bay structure is built of limestone with some hamstone and a mixture of English bond and Flemish bond brickwork. Some of the ceilings are original including one of six panels divided by chamfered beams and a roundel in the middle of each panel. One of the fireplaces has a Tudor oak lintel. In the mid C19 the building was occupied by George Parker (1796–1888) Customs Officer, historian and author.

== The collection ==
The museum was founded in 1926 by Bridgwater Borough Council, and its collecting area covered from East and West Huntspill in the North to Thurloxton in the South and from Ashcott and Burrowbridge in the East to beyond Nether Stowey in the West. This was the area of the Bridgwater Rural District Council. In 1974, the assets of the borough council were absorbed by Sedgemoor District Council, which ran the museum until 2009, when it could no longer afford to do so: the museum was then returned to the ownership of the town council.

From its inception until its return to the town council in 2009, the Museum was managed by paid curators assisted by volunteers. After the handover, volunteers undertook an extensive programme of renovation. This involved making repairs to the structure, rewiring, and redecorating. WiFi was also installed throughout the building. Wooden display cases were replaced by those of modern design with LED lighting, and artefact descriptions were written in a consistent typeface. Once complete the museum has been managed by honorary curators, assisted by volunteers. Volunteers have also maintained and funded the museum garden, as well as carrying out minor maintenance work, such as decorating.

The Friends of Blake Museum was formed in 2000 to support the Blake Museum practically and financially. Since 2009 it has published Blake News quarterly which records progress,

The collection includes materials relating to Blake's life. Robert Blake never had the rank of Admiral as it was not used in the Parliamentarian navy; his actual rank of General at Sea combined the role of an Admiral and Commissioner of the Navy. Notable features of the museum include Blake's sea chest. The museum also illustrates Bridgwater's mercantile and marine past and includes important local historical events such as the Battle of Sedgmoor. As well as a diorama of the Battle of Sedgemoor, the new Battle gallery covers conflicts from the time of King Alfred, the English Civil War as well as the 20th century. The museum possesses a very full archive of cuttings from the local newspaper, The Bridgwater Mercury, for every week of the war, 1914–1918.

There is also a small collection of agricultural machinery and tools, and dairy equipment, a group of coins found in the bank of King's Sedgemoor Drain. In 2012, the museum restored and put on display the Spaxton Mosaic. The collection also includes items of women's garments dating from the 19th century, a most extensive photographic collection, maritime and transport heritage items, brick, tile and textile items, and a Monmouth Rebellion archive. The museum houses the archive of the work of the local artist John Chubb (1746–1818). In 2004 the Museum purchased the art and manuscripts of Chubb, for £123.000.

The museum also had an association with Channel 4's archaeological television programme Time Team.

The Blake Museum works closely with the Bridgwater Heritage Group, which was established in 2012 by the late Dr Peter Cattermole to publish detailed illustrated accounts online of the town's lost buildings. Dr Cattermole was the museum's first Honorary Curator after its return to the town council, in 2009. Since then the scope has broadened to cover historic texts about the town in books and articles. These have been digitised in A4 format, and are PDF documents so that readers can download and print them for further study. Original historical research is included. The goal has been to create an educational resource for the town, of value not only for local historians, but also for school pupils and college students.

The museum's 90th birthday in 2016 was celebrated by a special exhibition. The Museum's Centenary in 2026, was celebrated first with an informal event on the day in April when the Museum originally opened, and another in August when nearly 500 visitors came. There was a series of guided tours, and visitors could handle replica weapons used in the Battle of Sedgemoor. Popular songs of the 1920's were performed.
