= Bridgwater =

Market town in Somerset, England

Coordinates: 51°07′41″N 3°00′15″W

- Town, civil parish
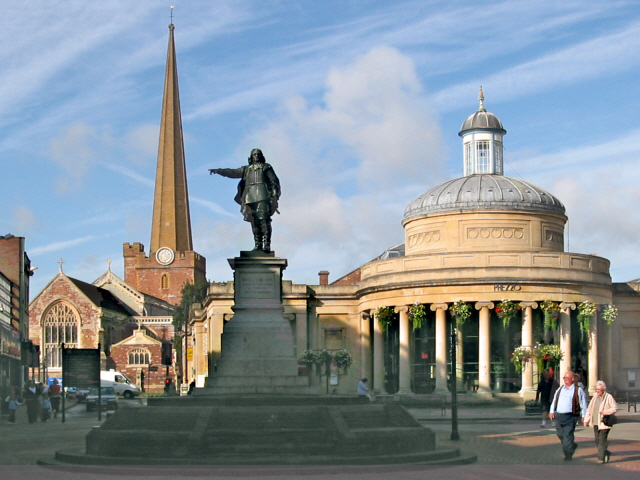
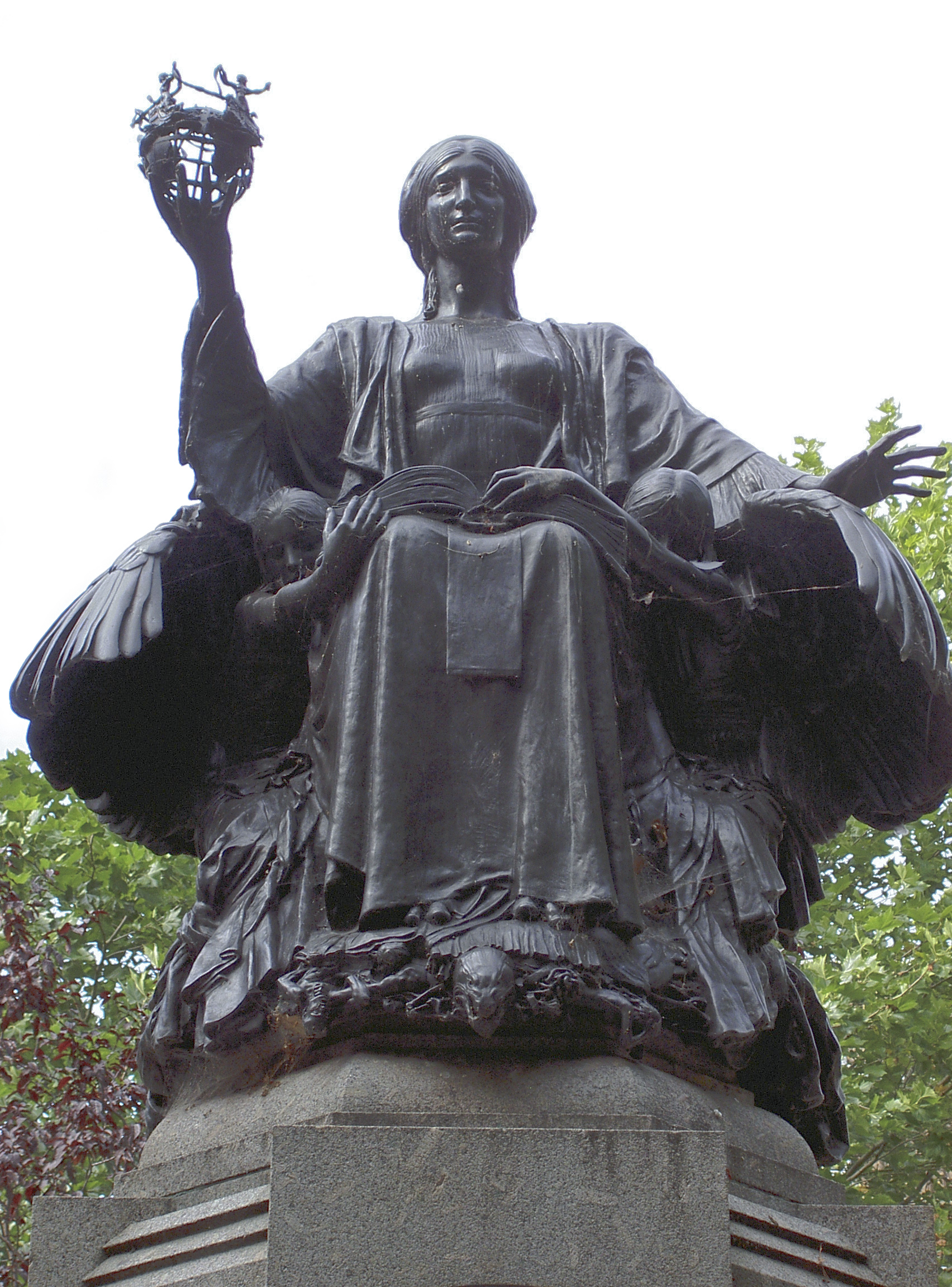
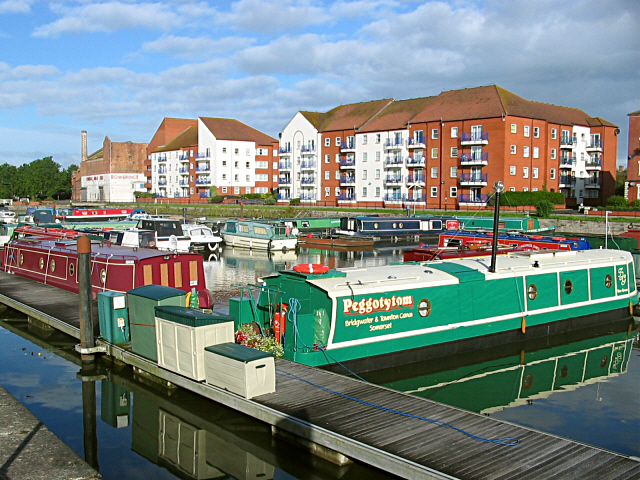
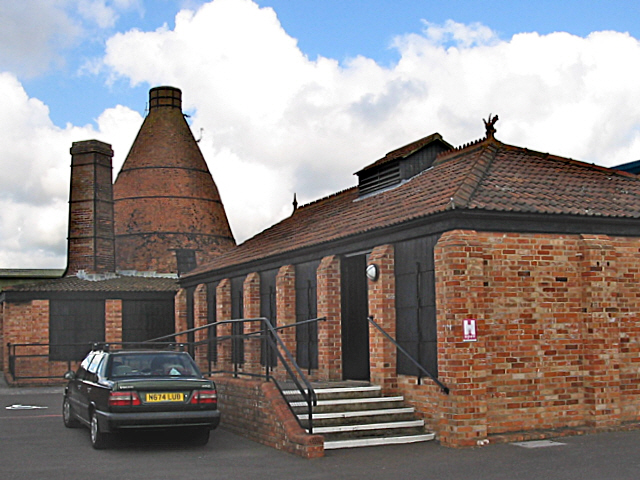
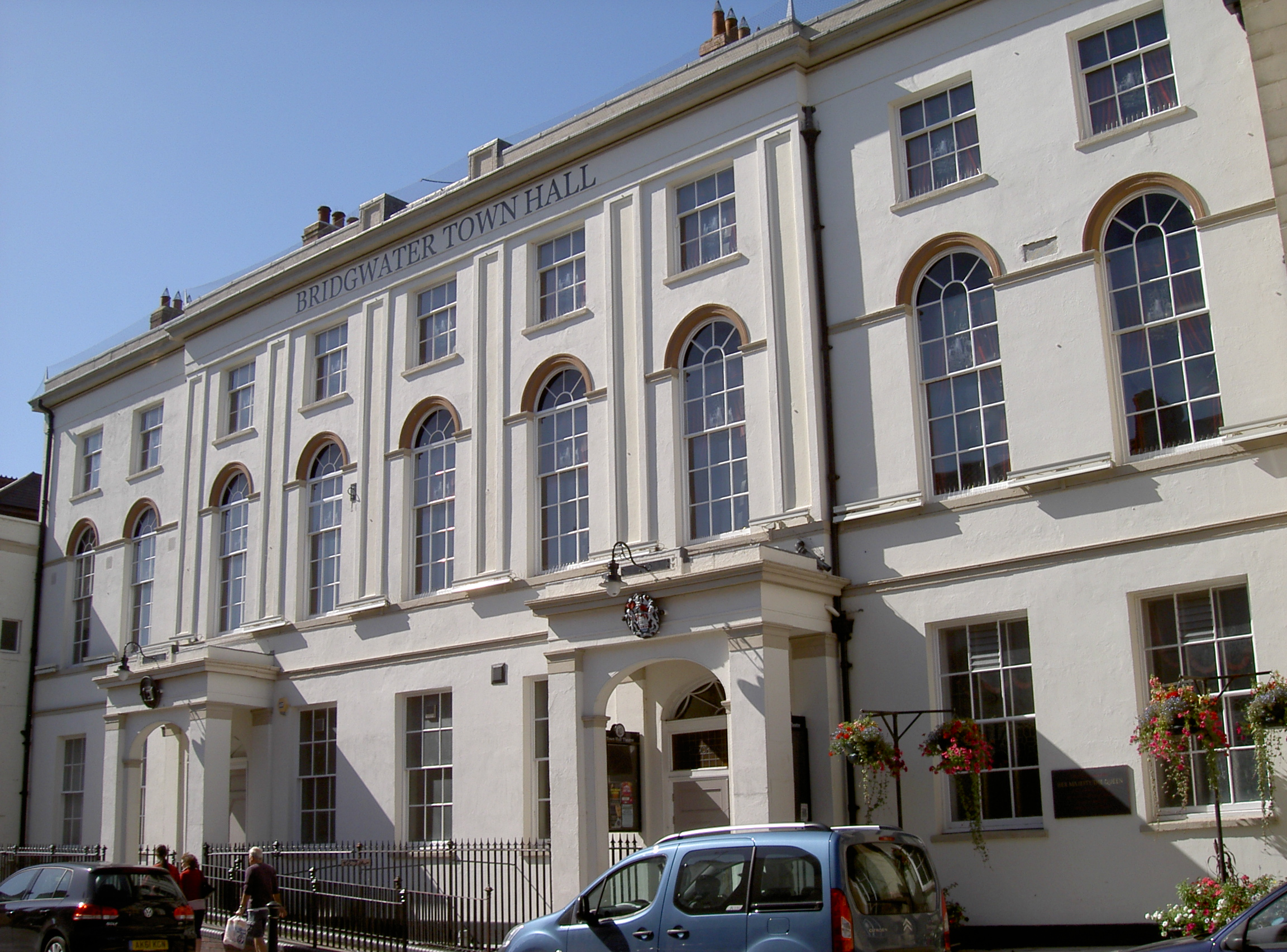
- From the top to bottom-right, Corn Exchange, Church of St Mary and statue of Robert Blake, Bridgwater War Memorial, The Port, Somerset Brick and Tile Museum, Bridgwater Town Hall

- Location within Somerset
- Interactive map showing parish boundary
- Population: 38,310 (Parish, 2021); 47,860 (Built up area, 2021)
- OS grid reference: ST305370
- Unitary authority: Somerset Council
- Ceremonial county: Somerset
- Region: South West
- Country: England
- Sovereign state: United Kingdom
- Post town: Bridgwater
- Postcode district: TA5, TA6, TA7
- Dialling code: 01278
- Police: Avon and Somerset
- Fire: Devon and Somerset
- Ambulance: South Western
- UK Parliament: Bridgwater

Bridgwater is a historic market town and civil parish in Somerset, England. It lies on the River Parrett at the edge of the Somerset Levels. At the 2021 census, the parish had a population of 38,310, and the built-up area had a population of 47,860. The town plays host to an annual carnival in November, the largest of the Somerset carnivals.

A town was already established here by the time of the Domesday Book of 1086. It first became a borough and a castle was built in 1200, although the castle was destroyed after the English Civil War. The town had a politically radical tendency and the Battle of Sedgemoor was fought nearby in 1685, ending the Monmouth Rebellion.

At one time it was the largest port in Somerset. It developed as an industrial centre with brick and tile works, ship building and railway engineering. Its many notable buildings include the Church of St Mary, which played a part in the Battle of Sedgemoor, and the Blake Museum, which was the birthplace of Admiral Blake in 1598.

== History ==
It is thought that the town was originally called Brigg, meaning quay. It has been argued that the name may instead come from the Old English brycg (gang plank) or Old Norse bryggja (quay), though this idea has been opposed on etymological grounds. In the Domesday Book the town is listed as Brugie, while Brugia was also used. After the Norman invasion the land was given to Walter of Douai, hence becoming known variously as Burgh-Walter, Brugg-Walter and Brigg-Walter, eventually corrupted to Bridgwater. An alternative version is that it derives from "Bridge of Walter" (i.e. Walter's Bridge).

Bridgwater is mentioned both in the Domesday Book and in the earlier Anglo-Saxon Chronicle dating from around 800, owing its origin as a trade centre to its position near to the mouth of the chief river in Somerset. It was formerly part of the Hundred of North Petherton. In a legend of Alfred the Great, he burnt some cakes while hiding in the marshes of Athelney near Bridgwater, after the Danish invasion in 875, while in 878 the major engagement of the Battle of Cynwit may have been at nearby Cannington.

The Lord of the manor of Bridgwater was granted to William Briwere in 1201 by King John. Through Briwere's influence, the king had granted three charters in 1200 for the construction of Bridgwater Castle, for the creation of a borough, and for a market.

Bridgwater Castle was a substantial structure built in Old Red Sandstone, covering a site of 8 or 9 acres (32,000 or 36,000 m^{2}). A tidal moat, up to 65 feet (20 m) wide in places, flowed about along the line of the modern thoroughfares of Fore Street and Castle Moat, and between Northgate and Chandos Street. The main entrance opposite the Cornhill was built with a pair of adjacent gates and drawbridges. In addition to a keep, located at the south-east corner of what is now King Square, documents show that the complex included a dungeon, chapel, stables and a bell tower. Built on the only raised ground in the town, the castle controlled the crossing of the town bridge. A portion of the castle wall and water gate can still be seen on West Quay, and the remains of a wall of a building that was probably built within the castle can be viewed in Queen Street. The foundations of the tower forming the north-east corner of the castle are buried beneath Homecastle House.

William Briwere also founded St John's hospital which, by the time of the Dissolution of the Monasteries under Henry VIII, was worth a substantial sum of more than 120 pounds. He was also responsible for starting the construction of the town's first stone bridge and went on to found the Bridgwater Friary.

Other charters were granted by Henry III in 1227 (confirmed in 1318, 1370, 1380). These gave Bridgwater a guild merchant which was important for the regulation of trade, allowing guild members to trade freely in the town, and to impose payments and restrictions upon others.

=== Incorporation and rebellions ===
During the 13th century Second Barons' War against Henry III, Bridgwater was held by Roger Mortimer, first Baron Mortimer against the King. Bridgwater's peasants under Nicholas Frampton took part in the Peasants' Revolt of 1381, sacking Sydenham House, murdering the local tax collectors and destroying the records.

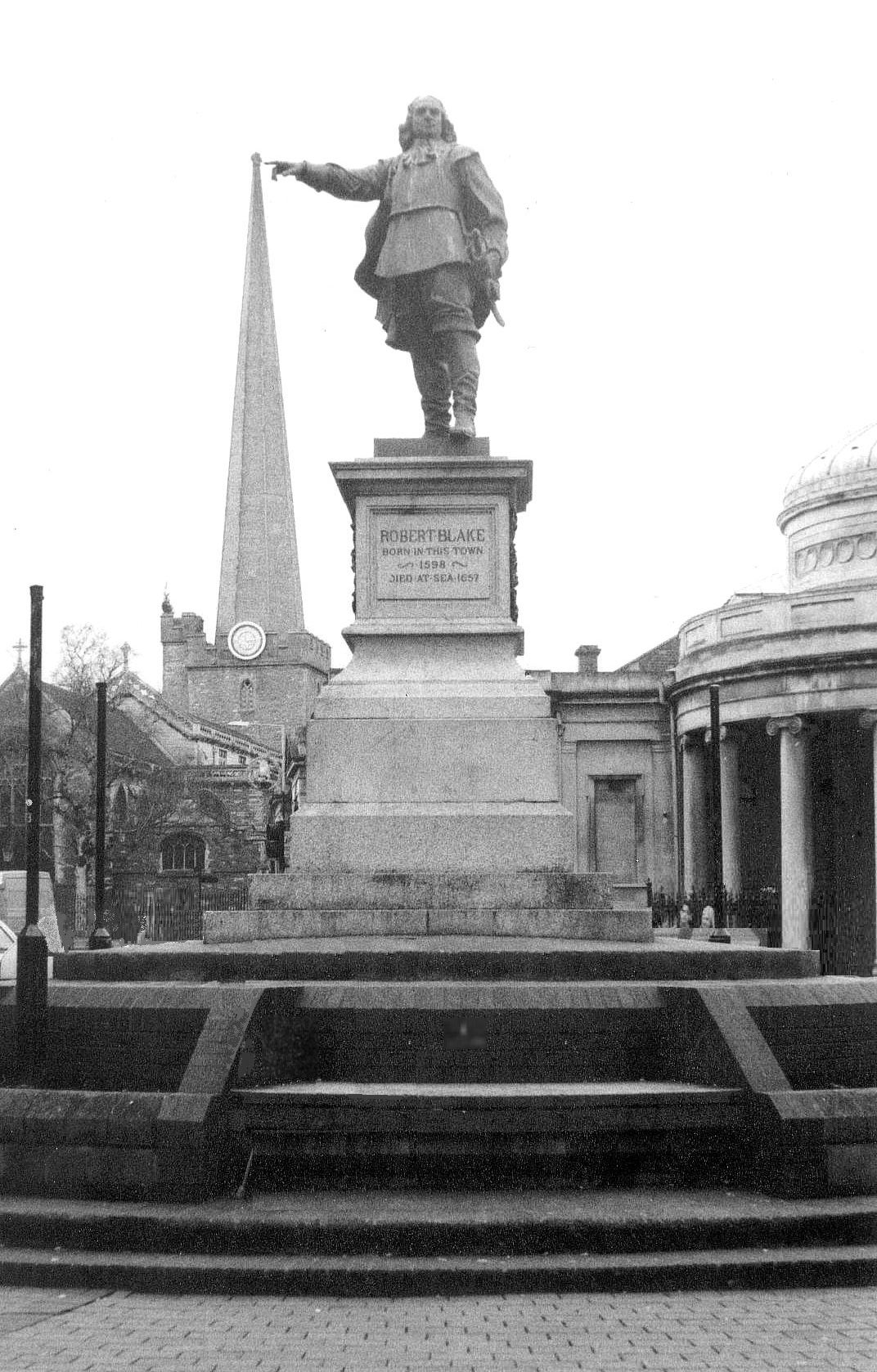
The statue of Robert Blake at Cornhill, Bridgwater, with St Mary's Church in the background (1998).

Bridgwater was incorporated by charter of Edward IV (1468), confirmed in 1554, 1586, 1629 and 1684. Parliamentary representation as a borough constituency began in 1295 and continued until 1870, when the original borough constituency was disenfranchised for corruption; from 4 July 1870 the town was incorporated within the county constituency of West Somerset. When parliamentary seats were redistributed for the 1885 general election, a new county division of Bridgwater was created. A variety of markets were granted to the town during the Middle Ages including a Midsummer fair (on 24 June), one at the beginning of Lent was added in 1468, and one at Michaelmas. The importance of these markets and fairs for the sale of wool and wine, and later of cloth, declined after medieval times. The shipping trade of the port revived after the construction of the new dock in 1841, and corn and timber have been imported for centuries.

In the English Civil War the town and the castle were held by the Royalists under Colonel Edmund Wyndham, a personal acquaintance of the King. British history might have been very different had his wife, Lady (Crystabella) Wyndham, been a little more accurate with a musket shot that missed Oliver Cromwell but killed his aide de camp. Eventually, with many buildings destroyed in the town, the castle and its valuable contents were surrendered to the Parliamentarians on 21 July 1645. The castle itself was deliberately destroyed (slighted) the following year, while in 1651 Colonel Wyndham made arrangements for Charles II to flee to France following the Battle of Worcester.

Following the restoration of the monarchy, in 1663 the non-conformist Reverend John Norman, vicar from 1647 to 1660, was one of several 'religious fanatics' confined to their homes by Lord Stawell's militia. A large religious meeting house, thought to have been Presbyterian, was demolished and its furniture burned on the Cornhill in 1683. By 1688, matters had calmed down enough for a new chapel, Christ Church, to be founded in Dampiet Street, the congregation of which became Unitarian in 1815.

In the 1685 Monmouth Rebellion, the rebel Duke of Monmouth was proclaimed King on the Cornhill in Bridgwater and in other local towns. He eventually led his troops on a night-time attack on the King's position near Westonzoyland. Surprise was lost when a musket was accidentally discharged, and the Battle of Sedgemoor resulted in defeat for the Duke. He was later beheaded at the Tower of London, and nine locals were executed for treason.

Bridgwater became the first town in Britain to petition the government to ban slavery, in 1785.

In 1896, the trade unionists of Bridgwater's brick and tile industry were involved a number of strikes. The government sent troops to the town to clear the barricades by force after the reading of the Riot Act.

=== Twentieth century and after ===
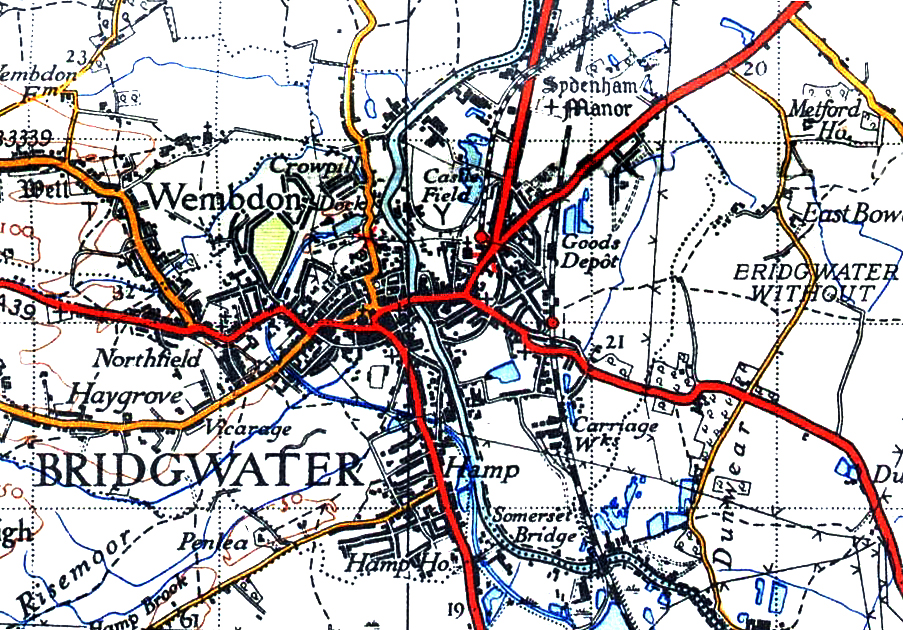
A map of Bridgwater in 1946

Journalist Vernon Bartlett was elected Member of Parliament in the 1938 by-election 1938. He stood as an independent candidate with an anti-Hitler campaign and campaigned against the Government's policy of appeasement.

In World War II the Bridgwater and Taunton Canal formed part of the Taunton Stop Line, designed to prevent the advance of a German invasion. Pillboxes can still be seen along its length. The first bombs fell on Bridgwater on 24 August 1940, destroying houses on Old Taunton Road, and three men, three women and one child were killed. Later a prisoner of war camp was established at Colley Lane, holding Italian prisoners. During the preparations for the invasion of Europe, American troops were based in the town.

The town's first council estate was built in the 1930s at Kendale Road, followed by those at Bristol Road. The 1950s saw the start of a significant increase in post-war housebuilding, with council house estates being started at Sydenham and Rhode Lane and the former cooperative estate near Durleigh.

On 4 November 2011 West Quay alongside the River Parrett and 19 adjoining properties were evacuated after a 40 metres (130 ft) stretch of the retaining wall partially collapsed after heavy rain and flooding. A tidal barrier is under construction to protect around 12,800 homes, businesses and critical infrastructure from tidal flooding.

The old hospital in Salmon Parade, which was built in 1813, closed in 2014 and has been replaced with a community hospital in Bower Lane. The old hospital site is being converted as campus for training NHS staff

== Governance ==
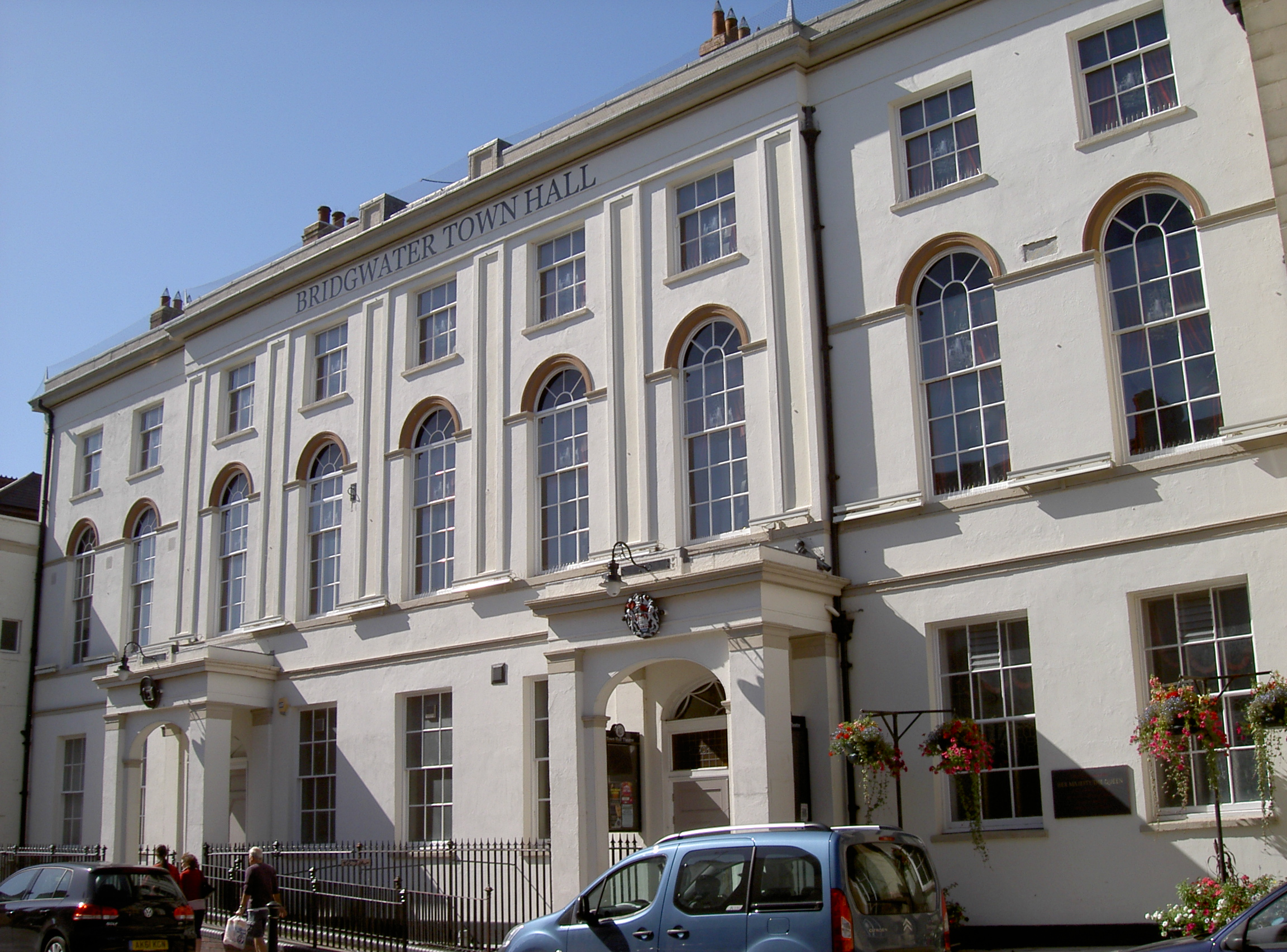
Bridgwater Town Hall

There are two tiers of local government covering Bridgwater, at parish (town) and unitary authority level: Bridgwater Town Council and Somerset Council. The town council is based at Bridgwater Town Hall on the High Street. The town hall was built in 1823 and subsequently extended in 1865 and again in the 1950s.

For national elections, the parish forms part of the Bridgwater constituency, which includes surrounding areas as well as the town itself.

=== Administrative history ===
Bridgwater was an ancient parish in the North Petherton hundred of Somerset. As well as the town itself, the parish historically also included surrounding rural areas.

Bridgwater was also an ancient borough, having been granted its first municipal charter in 1200. From 1295 onwards, it was also a parliamentary borough (constituency), electing two Members of Parliament. Until the 1830s, the borough boundaries matched the parish. In 1832, the constituency was redefined to cover a smaller area, focused on the built-up area of the town as it then was. In 1836, the borough was converted into a municipal borough under the Municipal Corporations Act 1835, which standardised how most boroughs operated across the country. As part of these reforms, the borough boundaries were reduced to match the constituency. Under the Local Government Act 1894, civil parishes were no longer allowed to straddle borough boundaries, and so the parish of Bridgwater was reduced to match the borough, and a new parish called Bridgwater Without was created covering the parts of the old parish outside the borough.

The borough of Bridgwater was abolished in 1974 under the Local Government Act 1972, with its area becoming part of the new Sedgemoor district. No successor parish was created for the area of the former borough at the time of the 1974 reforms, and so it became an unparished area. A new civil parish of Bridgwater was subsequently created in 2003, with its parish council taking the name Bridgwater Town Council.

Sedgemoor was abolished in 2023. Somerset County Council then took over district-level functions across its area, making it a unitary authority, and was renamed Somerset Council.

== Geography ==
Bridgwater is centred on an outcrop of marl in an area dominated by low-lying alluvial deposits. There are local deposits of gravels and sand. It is situated in a level and well-wooded area, on the edge of the Somerset Levels. To the north are the Mendip range and on the west the Quantock hills. The town lies along both sides of the River Parrett, 10 miles (16 km) from its mouth, which then flows to discharge into the Bridgwater Bay national nature reserve. The nature reserve consists of large areas of mud flats, saltmarsh, sandflats and shingle ridges, some of which are vegetated. Bridgwater Bay has been designated as a Site of Special Scientific Interest since 1989, and is designated as a wetland of international importance under the Ramsar Convention. The risks to wildlife are highlighted in the local Oil Spill Contingency Plan.

=== Climate ===
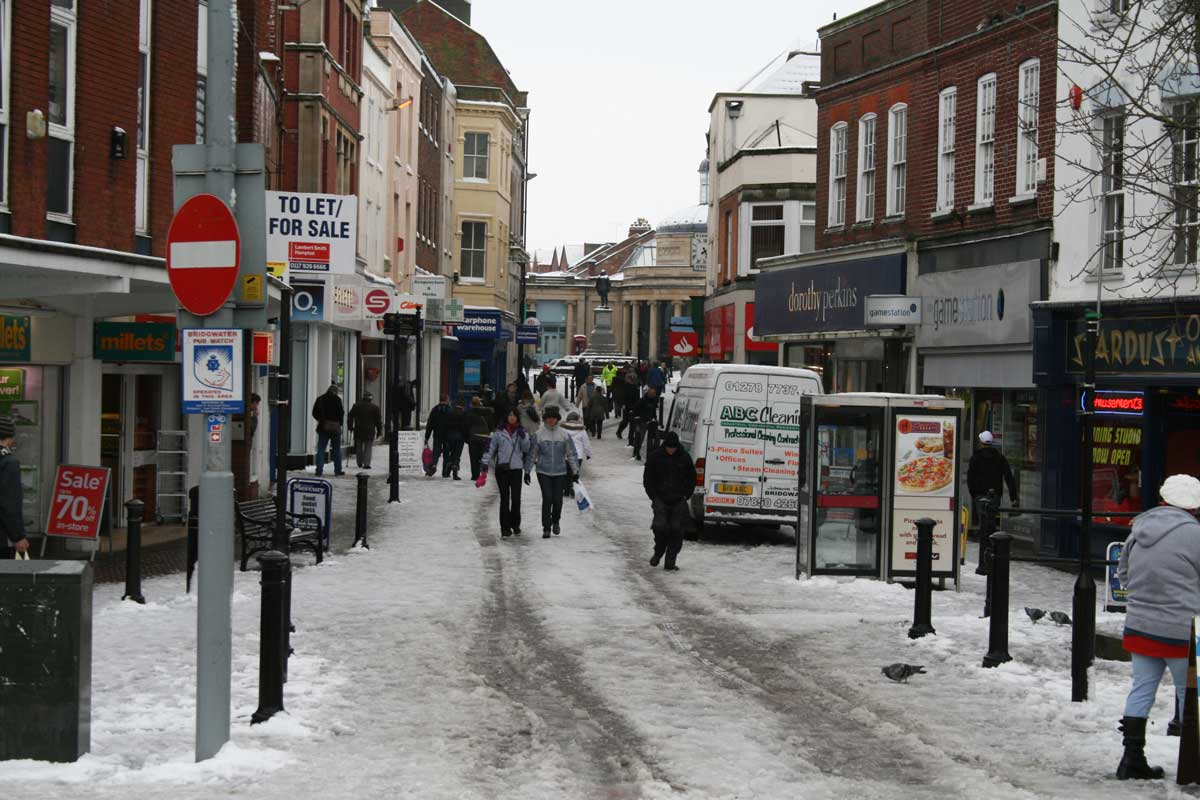
Fore street with a rare covering of snow. Admiral Robert Blake statue and Cornhill just visible in the background

Along with the rest of South West England, Bridgwater has a temperate climate which is generally wetter and milder than the rest of the country. The annual mean temperature is approximately 10 °C (50.0 °F). Seasonal temperature variation is less extreme than most of the United Kingdom because of the adjacent sea temperatures. The summer months of July and August are the warmest with mean daily maxima of approximately 21 °C (69.8 °F). In winter mean minimum temperatures of 1 or 2 °C (34 or 36 °F) are common. In the summer the Azores high pressure affects the south-west of England, however convective cloud sometimes forms inland, reducing the number of hours of sunshine. Annual sunshine rates are slightly less than the regional average of 1,600 hours. Most of the rainfall in the south-west is caused by Atlantic depressions or by convection. Most of the rainfall in autumn and winter is caused by the Atlantic depressions, which is when they are most active. In summer, a large proportion of the rainfall is caused by sun heating the ground leading to convection and to showers and thunderstorms. Average rainfall is around 700 mm (28 in). About 8–15 days of snowfall is typical. November to March have the highest mean wind speeds, and June to August have the lightest winds. The predominant wind direction is from the south-west.

Climate data for Yeovilton (1991–2020 normals, extremes 1964-present)
Month	Jan	Feb	Mar	Apr	May	Jun	Jul	Aug	Sep	Oct	Nov	Dec	Year
Record high °C (°F)	16.1 (61.0)	17.7 (63.9)	21.3 (70.3)	25.4 (77.7)	32.9 (91.2)	37.3 (99.1)	35.0 (95.0)	35.5 (95.9)	29.9 (85.8)	26.5 (79.7)	18.5 (65.3)	16.0 (60.8)	37.3 (99.1)
Mean daily maximum °C (°F)	8.6 (47.5)	9.0 (48.2)	11.2 (52.2)	13.9 (57.0)	17.1 (62.8)	19.9 (67.8)	21.9 (71.4)	21.6 (70.9)	19.2 (66.6)	15.3 (59.5)	11.5 (52.7)	9.0 (48.2)	14.9 (58.8)
Daily mean °C (°F)	5.3 (41.5)	5.4 (41.7)	7.1 (44.8)	9.2 (48.6)	12.3 (54.1)	15.1 (59.2)	17.1 (62.8)	16.9 (62.4)	14.6 (58.3)	11.5 (52.7)	8.0 (46.4)	5.7 (42.3)	10.7 (51.3)
Mean daily minimum °C (°F)	2.0 (35.6)	1.8 (35.2)	3.0 (37.4)	4.5 (40.1)	7.4 (45.3)	10.3 (50.5)	12.2 (54.0)	12.2 (54.0)	10.0 (50.0)	7.6 (45.7)	4.4 (39.9)	2.3 (36.1)	6.5 (43.7)
Record low °C (°F)	−16.1 (3.0)	−12.2 (10.0)	−10.0 (14.0)	−6.4 (20.5)	−4.1 (24.6)	0.0 (32.0)	4.4 (39.9)	2.9 (37.2)	−1.8 (28.8)	−4.8 (23.4)	−8.0 (17.6)	−14.2 (6.4)	−16.1 (3.0)
Average precipitation mm (inches)	70.0 (2.76)	50.9 (2.00)	48.5 (1.91)	51.5 (2.03)	47.2 (1.86)	57.1 (2.25)	50.2 (1.98)	60.7 (2.39)	53.3 (2.10)	80.9 (3.19)	81.9 (3.22)	77.4 (3.05)	729.5 (28.72)
Average precipitation days (≥ 1.0 mm)	12.2	10.4	10.0	10.0	9.2	8.7	8.3	9.8	9.1	12.0	13.2	12.9	125.8
Mean monthly sunshine hours	59.5	79.5	121.6	170.5	202.2	199.8	205.3	185.5	149.2	107.6	71.6	53.5	1,605.7
Source 1: Met Office
Source 2: Starlings Roost Weather

== Demography ==
The population of Bridgwater in 1841 was just 9,899, and by 1901 had risen to 14,900. At the 2021 census, Bridgwater civil parish had a population of 38,310 people in 16,543 households.

Census population of Bridgwater parish
Census	Total	Females	Males	Households	Source
2011	35,886	18,232	17,654	15,363	
2021	38,310	18,920	19,390	16,543	

The Office for National Statistics also defines a Bridgwater 'Built-up Area', which includes contiguous urbanised areas outside the civil parish such as Dunwear and King's Drive in Bridgwater Without, and new build housing on the southern and western periphery of the town in North Petherton, Durleigh and Wembdon parishes (excluding the old villages and rural parts of those parishes); this area had a population of 47,860 in 2021. In 1971 the population in the 'Bridgwater Built-up Area' was 20,639 and by 2001 it was given as 35,000.

== Economy ==
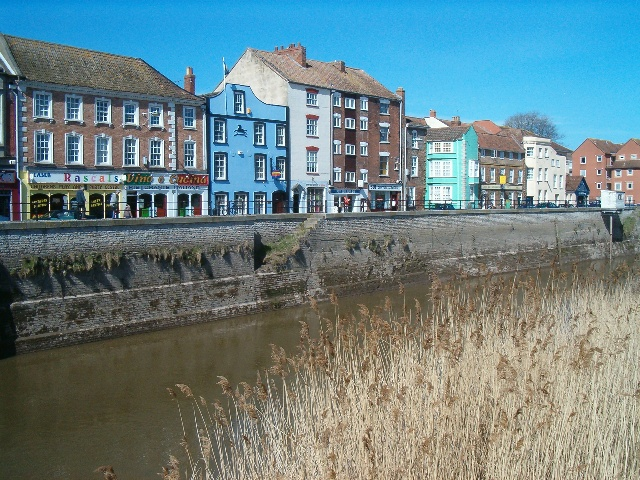
West Quay and the River Parrett

As early as 1300, the port of Bridgwater exported wheat, peas and beans to Ireland, France and Spain, and by 1400 was also exporting cloth from Somerset and the adjoining counties. By 1500 it was the largest port in Somerset. By 1845 the town's shipping quays were defined as extending at least 716 ft (218 m) downstream from the town bridge, on both banks of the Parrett. In its heyday, imports included wine, grain, fish, hemp, coal and timber. Exports included wheat, wool, cloth, cement, bricks and tiles. Unlike Bristol, Bridgwater was never involved in the Atlantic slave trade and, in 1785, was the first town in Britain to petition the government to ban it.

A small vessel referred to as the Emanuel of Bridgwater, a type of deep-sea fishing vessel or small trader known as a 'buss', formed part of a fleet of 15 vessels accompanying Martin Frobisher on his voyage in 1578 across the Atlantic Ocean, to the New World, to what is now an area within the Provinces and territories of Canada. The year before, in 1577, Frobisher had found an unknown island or peninsular during his second voyage to the New World, and had provisionally claimed it in the name of Queen Elizabeth I of England. On this third voyage in 1578 Frobisher had a large fleet as he planned to create a settlement in Meta Incognita. On commencing their return home, the Emanuel of Bridgwater, (Note: There were two vessels named Emanuel in Frobisher's 1578 fleet but were likely to be distinguished by using their respective home ports: the smaller boat Emanuel of Bridgwater and the larger boat as Emanuel of Exeter.) carrying miners and 110 long tons (120 short tons) of, what was believed to be, the gold-bearing rocks and ores they had extracted, got into difficulties in a storm near Beare Sound. She was believed to have been lost and was left behind by the other ships in the fleet. However, she survived the incident and sailed back across the Atlantic on her own, in 16 days, to the southwest tip of Ireland with her crew, passengers and cargo; but was wreaked near Smerwick harbour, County Kerry, when attempting to unload her cargo of ores. The English writer and priest Richard Hakluyt records the testimony of a passenger travelling on the Emanuel: during the return voyage an unknown land, a phantom island, was found and given the name Buss Island, four-days sailing from the nearest coast.

Farr provides a brief snapshot of the number of vessels registered to the Port of Bridgwater and their tonnage. There were 33 vessels registered in 1786. By 1874 this had increased to 159 but the registrations then started to reduce, down to 132 vessels in 1882. (Note: The numbers of ships given are registered in the whole Port of Bridgwater which includes coastal harbours such as Minehead and Watchet.) The average size of vessel also appears to decrease; with peak registered total tonnage being reached in 1857: 142 vessels providing 17,519 long tons (19,621 short tons) total tonnage. In contrast, at the peak number of 159 vessels in 1874, the total registered tonnage was 10,613 long tons (11,887 short tons).

=== Industry ===
The Chandos Glass Cone was built in 1725 as a glasswork firing kiln by James Brydges, 1st Duke of Chandos as part of an industrial development. After a short period of use for glassmaking it was converted for the production of pottery, bricks and tiles, which continued until 1939. The majority of the brickwork cone was demolished in 1943. The bottom 2.4 metres (7 ft 10 in) has been preserved and scheduled as an ancient monument.

Bridgwater was the leading industrial town in Somerset, becoming a major manufacturing centre for clay tiles and bricks in the 19th century; including the famous Bath bricks, which were mostly used as scouring or polishing pads rather than as a construction material. These goods were exported through the port; at the peak of production some 24 million bricks were exported from Bridgwater every year from 10 manufacturers. These industries are featured in the Somerset Brick and Tile Museum on East Quay. These industries collapsed in the aftermath of World War II due to the failure to introduce mechanisation, although the automated Chilton Tile Factory, which produced up to 5 million tiles each year, lasted until 1968.

Castle House (originally named Portland Castle after Portland cement), reputedly the first domestic house in the UK to be built from concrete, was constructed in 1851 by John Board, one of the local brick and tile manufacturers. The building is now Grade II* listed, It was featured in the BBC's 2004 television programme Restoration.

Bridgwater was also home to a number of iron foundries from the nineteenth century. George Hennet's Bridgwater Iron Works worked on bridges, railways and machinery for Brunel and Robert Stephenson. This location allowed the import by boat of raw materials from Wales and the dispatch of finished work to south Devon using the Bristol and Exeter Railway. The carriage workshops for the latter were on an adjacent site. The works passed to his son and then traded as Hennet, Spink & Else. Some of the ironwork was produced for the Royal Albert Bridge at Saltash, Cornwall. In 1873 it became the Bridgwater Engineering Company Limited but this failed in 1878. W&F Wills Ltd produced steam engines and fingerposts.

The twentieth century saw Bridgwater's industrial base diversify. The Official Guide of 1969 listed 'animal feeding stuffs, battery construction, bonded fibres, brushes, corsets and brassieres, electrical and general engineers, fencing, footwear, preserves and jams, printing, saw blades, steel wire and wire rope, transparent cellulose wrappings, shirts and collars'. The cellulose wrappings were produced by British Cellophane, a joint venture between La Cellophane and Courtaulds, which had opened a major factory producing cellophane in 1937. The factory produced Bailey bridges during World War II for the invasion of Europe. After the war, it returned to making cellophane. The company was bought by UCB Films (now Innovia Films) in 1996 but closed in 2005.

== Landmarks ==
=== River Parrett and its bridges ===
The River Parrett flows through the town. The town centre grew up on the west bank; the old part of the town on the east bank is known as Eastover. The Drove Bridge, which marks the current extent of the Port of Bridgwater, is the nearest to the mouth and the newest road bridge to cross the river. With a span of 184 feet (56 m), the bridge was constructed as part of the Bridgwater Northern Distributor road scheme (1992), and provides a navigable channel which is 66 feet (20 m) wide with 8.2 feet (2.5 m) headroom at normal spring high tides. Upstream of this is the retractable Telescopic Bridge, built in 1871 to the design of Francis Fox, the engineer for the Bristol & Exeter Railway. It carried a railway siding over the river to the docks, but had to be movable to allow boats access to and from the quays further up river. An 80-foot (24 m) section of railway track to the east of the bridge could be moved sideways, so that the main 127-foot (39 m) girders could be retracted, creating a navigable channel which was 78 feet (24 m) wide. It was manually operated for the first eight months, and then powered by a steam engine, reverting to manual operation in 1913, when the steam engine failed. The bridge was last opened in 1953, and the traverser section was demolished in 1974, but public outcry at the action resulted in the bridge being listed as a scheduled monument, and the rest of the bridge was kept. It was later used as a road crossing, until the construction of the Chandos road bridge alongside it, and is now only used by pedestrians. Parts of the steam engine were moved to Westonzoyland Pumping Station Museum in 1977.

The next bridge is the Town Bridge which is the limit of navigation for larger ships coming from the sea, but smaller boats can navigate along the Parrett towards Langport and onto the lower part of the River Tone. There has been a bridge here since the 13th century, when Bridgwater was granted a charter by King John. The present bridge was designed by R. C. Else and G. B. Laffan, and the 75-foot (23 m) cast iron structure was completed in 1883. It replaced an earlier bridge, which was the first cast iron bridge to be built in Somerset when it was completed in 1797. The stone abutments of that bridge were reused by the later bridge, which formed the only road crossing of the river in Bridgwater until 1958. Above the bridge there were two shoals, called The Coals and The Stones, which were a hazard to barge traffic on the river, and bargees had to choose carefully when to navigate the river, to ensure that there was sufficient water to carry them over these obstructions.

A new reinforced concrete road bridge, the Blake Bridge, was opened in March 1958 as part of a bypass to take road traffic away from the centre of Bridgwater. It now carries the A38 and A39 roads. On the southern edge of Bridgwater there is a bridge which carries the Bristol and Exeter Railway across the River Parrett. Isambard Kingdom Brunel designed a brick bridge, known as the Somerset Bridge, with a 100 feet (30 m) span but a rise of just 12 feet (3.7 m). Work started in 1838 and was completed in 1841. Brunel left the scaffold supporting the centre of the bridge in place as the foundations were still settling but was forced to remove it in 1843 to reopen the river for navigation. Brunel demolished the brick arch and had replaced it with a timber arch within six months without interrupting the traffic on the railway. This was in turn replaced in 1904 by a steel girder bridge.

=== Buildings ===
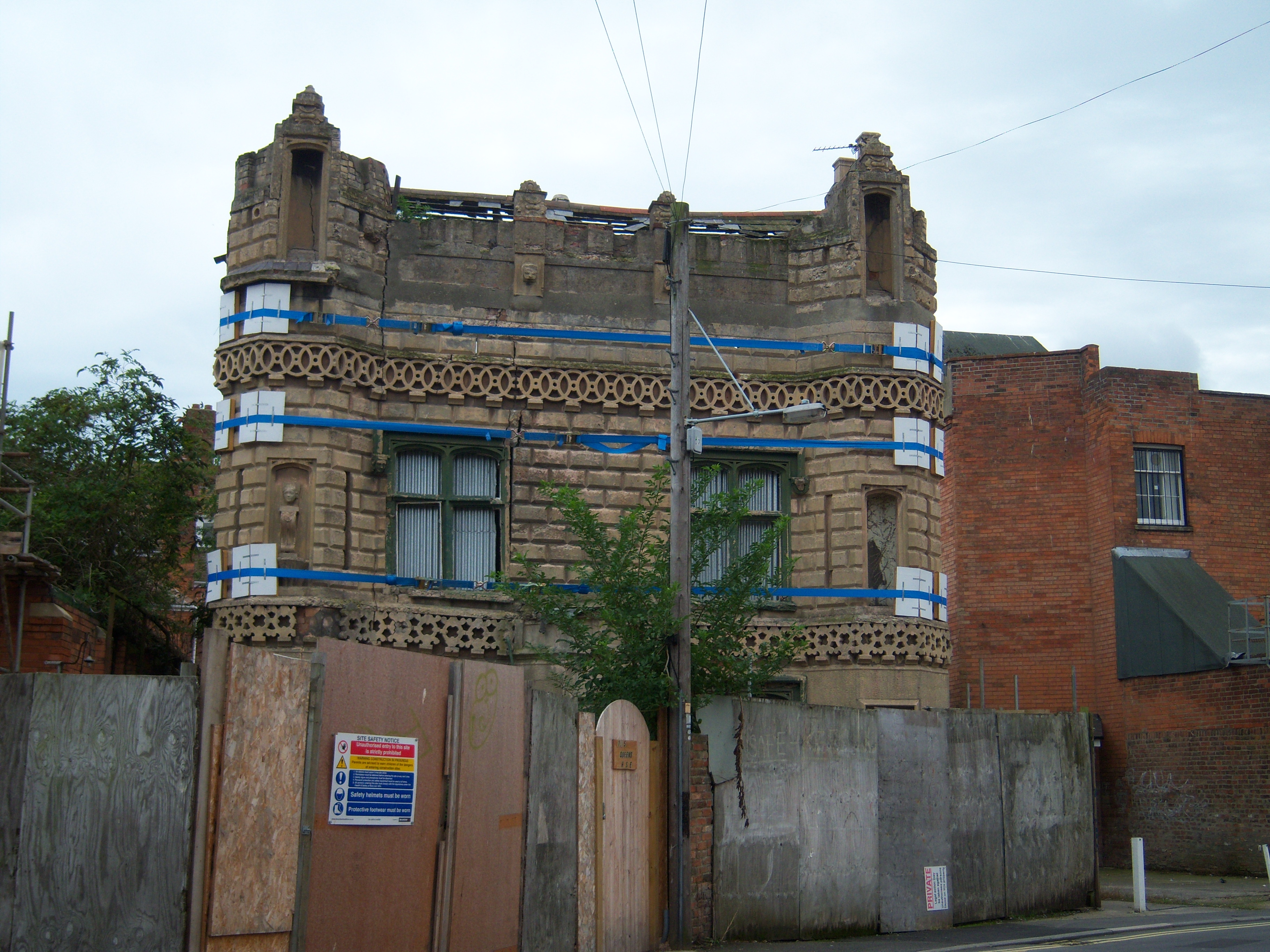
Castle House, in 2008 prior to restoration

Bridgwater is home to the Somerset Brick and Tile Museum on East Quay which occupies a very small part of the former Barham Brothers site (brick and tile manufacturers between 1857 and 1965). The museum consists of a repaired/restored, original bottle oven and lean-to buildings; which are a scheduled monument and grade II* listed building. The otherwise empty spaces in the buildings have been repurposed to house many of the original brick and tile moulds and handtools used by the brick and tile makers; together with advertising material and tile pattern books. On special open days, visitors - children in particular - are allowed to make and decorate small clay objects, but they can't 'fire them'. The museum will fire these items in an electric oven; and the finished items can either be collected a few days later, or on the next museum open day.

A house in Blake Street, largely restored, is believed to be the birthplace of Robert Blake in 1598, and is now the Blake Museum. It was built in the late 15th or early 16th century, and has been designated as a grade II* listed building. The Bridgwater Town Mill, originating in the Middle Ages is located at the end of Blake Street, next to the Blake Museum. A statue of Robert Blake, made by F. W. Pomeroy in 1898, is positioned in front of the Corn Exchange to face down Cornhill.

Castle House on Queen Street was built in 1851. It was one of the first buildings to make extensive use of concrete. It is also listed grade II*. For many years, since at least the 1990s, it has been empty, boarded up, listed on the Heritage at Risk Register, and held together with large bands, to stop it collapsing outwards. (Note: See Image, Castle House, immediately above where three blue bands are visible.) More recently, in November 2018, Castle House was full restored externally; awaiting a new use, a source of funding for internal restoration; and tenants. It is now occupied.

The public library in Binford place was designed by the architect, E Godfrey Page, and the oldest parts date back to 1905. It is listed as grade II. The money to build the library was provided by the American philanthropist Andrew Carnegie, so the library is 'member' of various groupings of libraries, mostly in America and perhaps a handful' in England and Wales, known as Carnegie libraries. The architectural style of this building is, was known as, Edwardian Gothic. There is a plaque on the side of the building recording the generosity of Andrew Carnegie, and the date of its formal opening by the town's Mayor, on 21 September 1906. The library was extended in 1970; and a part of the Carnegie building was damaged by fire in 1978 and needed to be restored.

Sydenham Manor House, built in the early 16th century but rebuilt after 1613, is another grade II listed building. It is currently a constituent part of the workers campus site for Hinkley Point C nuclear power station, off Bath Road.

== Transport ==
=== Water ===
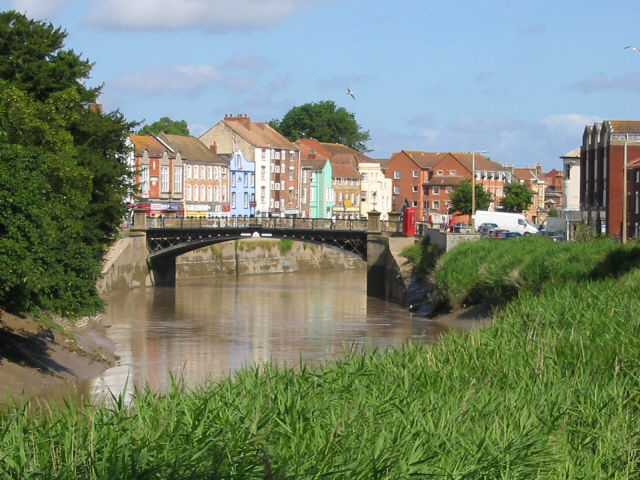
Bridgwater Town Bridge, the original highest point of navigation on the River Parrett for sea-going ships

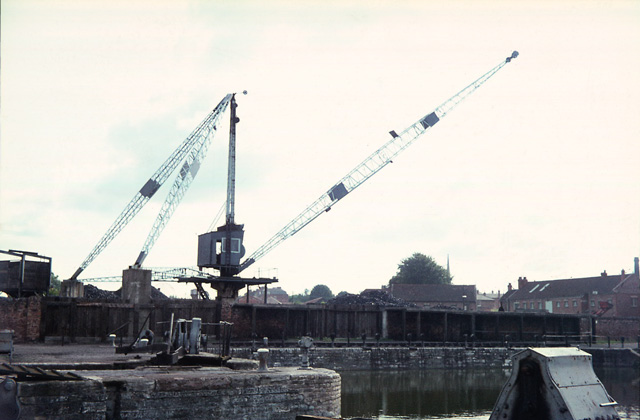
Bridgwater Docks South Side in 1968

Bridgwater was part of the Port of Bristol until the Port of Bridgwater was created in 1348, covering 80 miles (130 km) of the Somerset coast line, from the Devon border to the mouth of the River Axe. Under an 1845 Act of Parliament the Port of Bridgwater extends from Brean Down to Hinkley Point in Bridgwater Bay, and includes parts of the River Parrett (to Bridgwater), River Brue and the River Axe.

The River Parrett was used to transport Hamstone from the quarry at Ham Hill in the medieval period. The main port on the river developed at Bridgwater where the lowest bridge was situated; the first bridge was built in 1200. Quays were built in 1424; another quay, the Langport slip, was built in 1488 upstream of the Town Bridge. A Customs House was sited at Bridgwater, on West Quay; and a dry dock, launching slips and a boat yard on East Quay. The river was navigable, with care, to Bridgwater Town Bridge by 400 to 500 tonnes (440 to 550 tons) vessels. By trans-shipping into barges at Bridgwater, goods could be carried further up the river as far as Langport and (via the River Yeo) to Ilchester. After 1827, it was also possible to transfer goods to Taunton via the Bridgwater and Taunton Canal at Huntworth. A floating harbour was constructed between 1837–1841 and the canal was extended to the harbour. The harbour area contained flour mills, timber yards and chandlers.

Shipping to Bridgwater expanded with the construction of Bridgwater Docks, and reached a peak between 1880 and 1885 with an average of 3,600 ships per year entering the port. Bridgwater also built some 167 ships; F J Carver and Son owned a small dry dock on East Quay and constructed the last ship to be built Irene which was launched in 1907.

The importance of shipping and the docks then started to decline as traffic transferred to railways and ships became too big for the port. The last commercial use of the docks was when coal imports ceased on 31 July 1971. Although ships no longer dock in the town of Bridgwater, 90,213 tonnes (99,443 tons) of cargo were handled within the port authority's area in 2006, most of which was stone products via the wharf at Dunball, mainly marine sand and gravels dredged in the Bristol Channel. Marine sand and gravel accounted for 55,754 tonnes (61,458 tons) of the total tonnage of 90,213 tonnes (99,443 tons) using the Port facilities in 2006, with salt products accounting for 21,170 tonnes (23,340 tons) in the same year.

Somerset Council acts as the Competent Harbour Authority for the port, and has provided pilotage services for all boats over 98 feet (30 m) using the river since 1998, when it took over the service from Trinity House. Pilotage is important because of the constant changes in the navigable channel resulting from the large tidal range, which can exceed 39 feet (11.9 m) on spring tides.

=== Railways ===
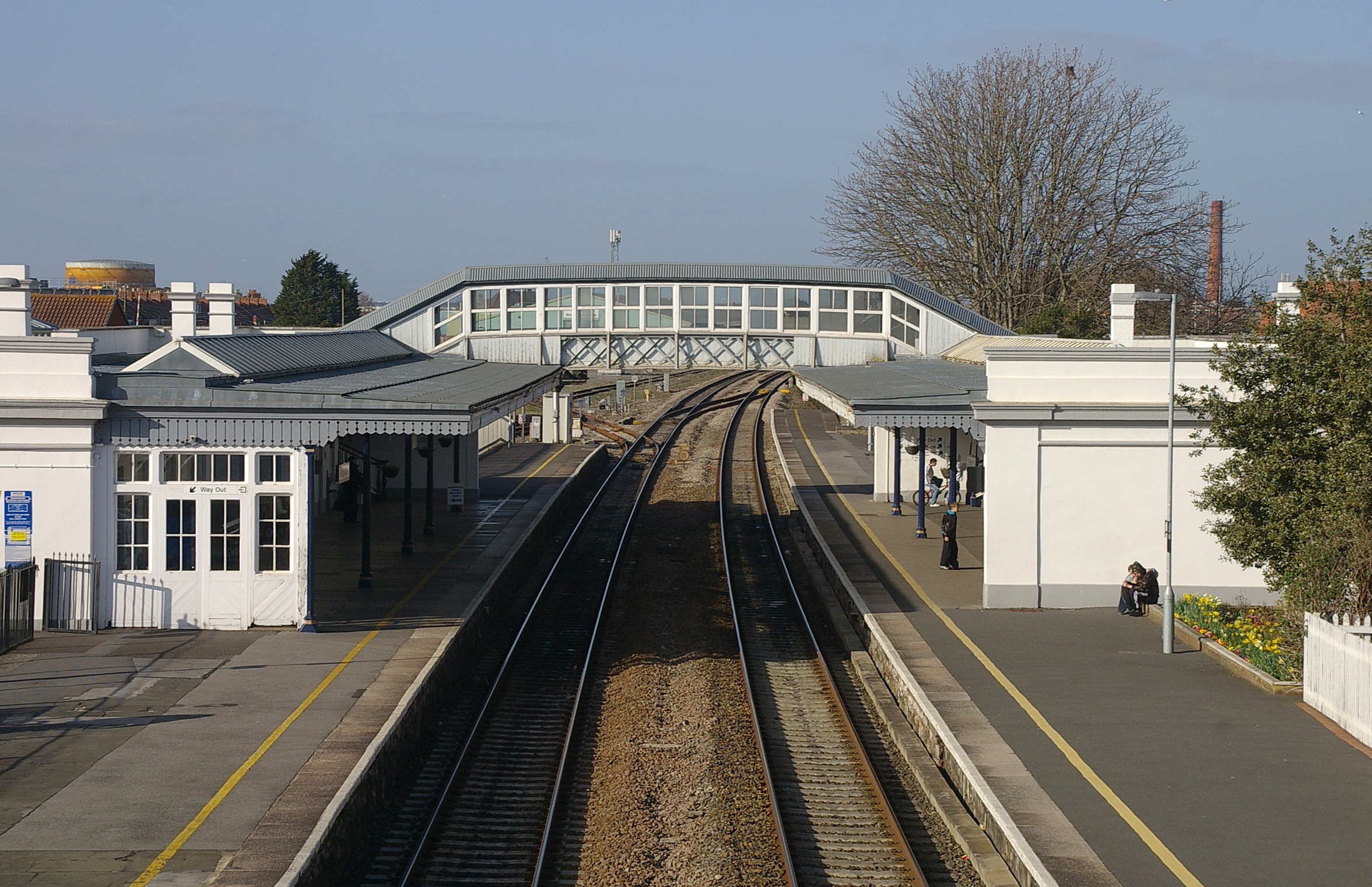
Bridgwater railway station, on the main line from Bristol to Taunton.

Bridgwater railway station is on St John Street. It is served by Great Western Railway services between Cardiff Central, Bristol Temple Meads and Taunton. Some services continue beyond Taunton to and from Exeter St Davids or even Penzance. There are also a small number of through trains to London Paddington via Bristol temple Meads and Bath Spa.

The Bristol & Exeter Railway opened on 14 June 1841 from Bristol to Bridgwater. The railway also opened a coach and wagon works in the town; the last of the buildings was in 2005 scheduled for demolition. Bridgwater railway station, designed by Isambard Kingdom Brunel is now a grade II listed building. An end to the unequal competition between rail and canal came in 1867 when the Bristol & Exeter Railway purchased the canal.<

Another station, the terminus of a Somerset and Dorset Joint Railway branch line from Edington was opened in 1890 but closed in 1952. It was situated where Sainsbury's supermarket is today

=== Road ===
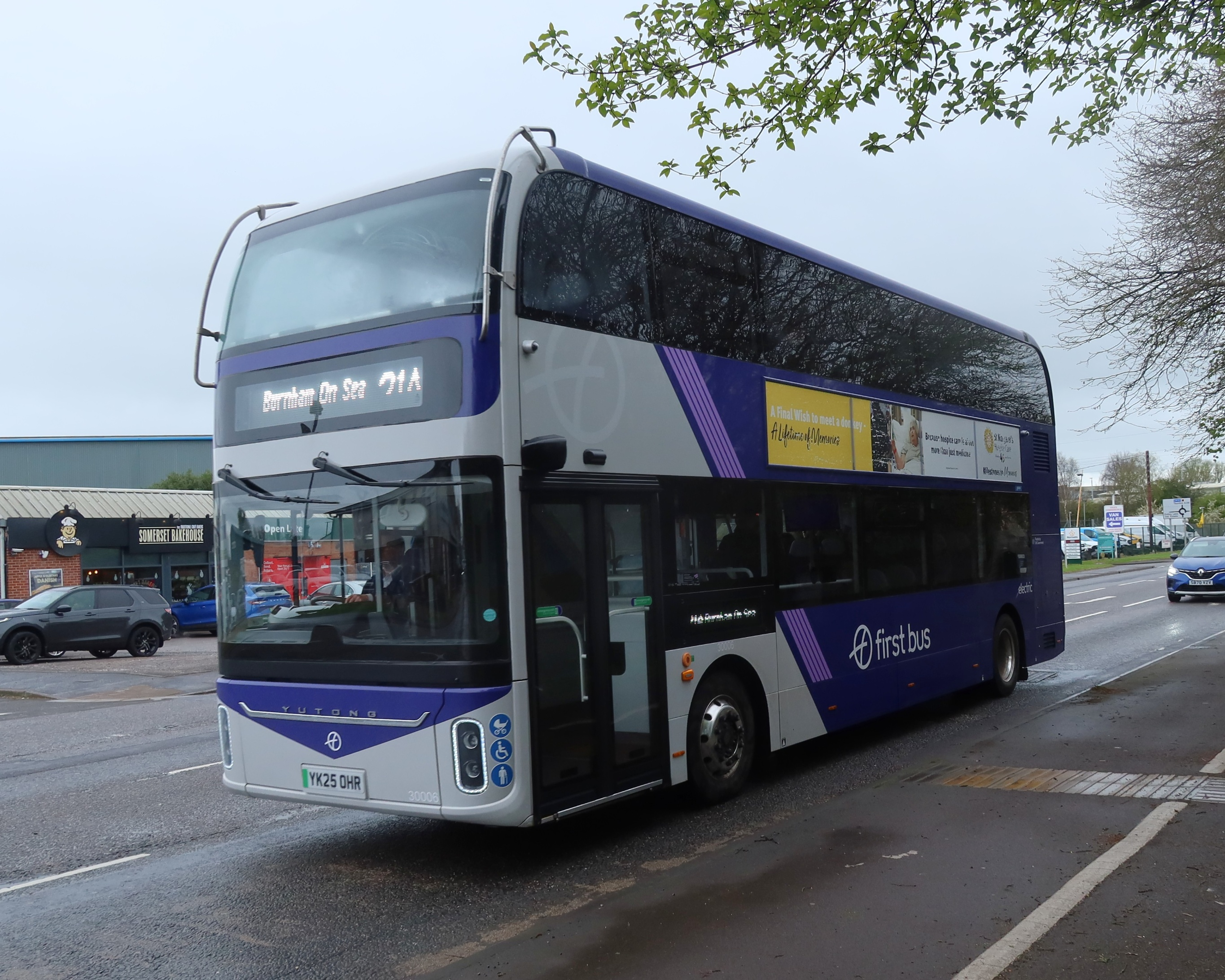
A First South West electric bus on the A38 Taunton Road

Bridgwater can be reached by the M5 motorway. Junction 23 is at Puriton to the north of the town, and junction 24 is at Huntworth to the south. The A38 road connects the town to Bristol and Taunton, the A39 road connects with Watchet, Glastonbury and Bath. The A372 road leaves the town through Westonzoyland and continues towards Yeovil.

Bridgwater bus station is on Watson's Lane near East Quay. Most local bus services are provided by First South West but staff and community services for Hinkley Point C are contracted to Somerset Passenger Solutions. Express services operated by is served twice daily by Berrys Coaches, Flixbus and National Express call at the bus station. Falcon services call at a bus stop by the motorway junction 24.

== Education ==
The Bridgwater campus of Bridgwater and Taunton College is on Bath Road. The southern hub of the National College for Nuclear was launched at the Bridgwater campus in February 2018 as a scheme to provide trained staff for Hinkley Point C nuclear power station.

Bridgwater was selected as the first town in the South West, outside Bristol, to be selected for the UK government's Building Schools for the Future (BSF) initiative, which aimed to rebuild and renew nearly every secondary school in England. Within Bridgwater, BSF was to redevelop all of the four secondary schools and two special provision schools at an expected cost of around £100 million. This included the complete relocation and rebuilding of a new school combining both the Haygrove and Penrose Schools. In July 2010, several components of the Bridgwater BSF programme were cancelled and others were singled out for further review. Following a meeting with Education Secretary Michael Gove, Bridgwater MP Ian Liddell-Grainger announced that the fate of all six affected schools would be subject to review, including the ones that were cancelled.

== Religious sites ==
The main church in Bridgwater is the Church of St Mary in the town centre. It has a north porch and windows dating from the 14th century and a distinctive 170 feet (52 m) slender spire; but it has been much altered by restoration. It possesses a fine painted reredos, and has been designated by English Heritage as a grade I listed building. There is also Christ Church Unitarian Chapel on Dampiet Street, built in 1688, it still retains many of its original features from 1688 and its remodeling in 1788. It has been designated as a grade II* listed building.

The Church of St John the Baptist in Blake Place, Eastover, was designed by John Brown and built by John More Capes in 1843. There is a Salvation Army Citadel located in Moorland Road on the Sydenham Estate, and St Joseph's Roman Catholic in Binford Place.

The Quaker Meeting House on Friarn Street was sold in 2014 to become the Bridgwater Islamic Centre. The Elim Pentecostal Church on Church Street became a public house after being used as a church and is now a shop.

== Culture ==
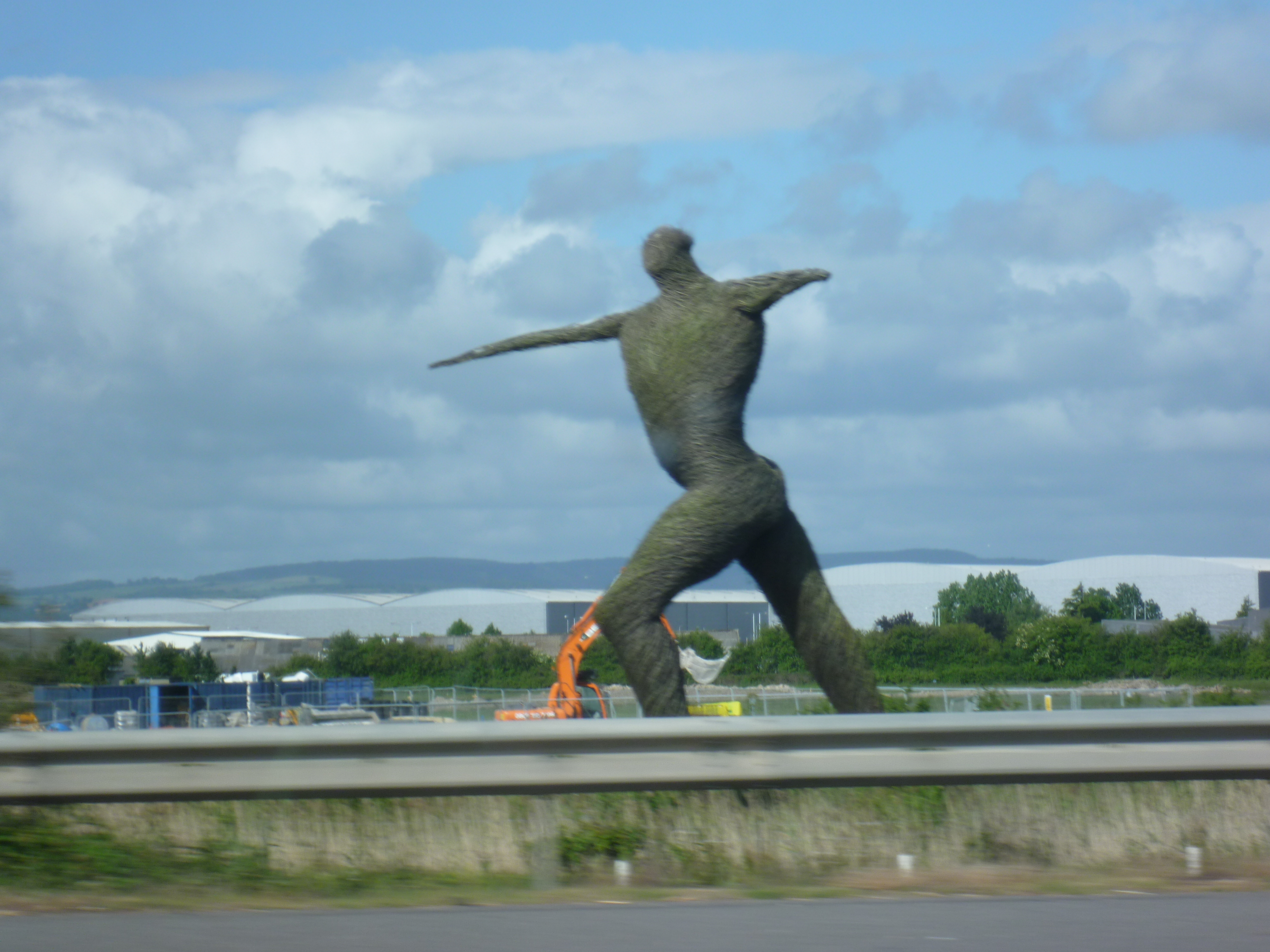
The Willow Man

Nearing Bridgwater on the M5 motorway it is possible to see the Willow Man sculpture, (Note: The Willow Man is a sometimes called the Angel of the South, a comparison with the Angel of the North sculpture.) a 12 metres (39 ft) tall striding human figure constructed from willow. It was created by sculptor Serena de la Hey and is the largest known sculpture in willow, a traditional local material.

The Bridgwater Arts Centre was opened on 10 October 1946. It occupies two former houses, Numbers 11 and 13, Castle Street, built 1723-28. They are Grade I listed in the Georgian Castle Street designed by Benjamin Holloway for the Duke of Chandos, and built over the site of the former castle. Holloway was also the architect of the Baroque style Lions building on West Quay, constructed around 1730.

Somerset Film (then Somerset Film & Video) opened the Engine Room community media centre on the High Street in March 2003. The centre allows the public to drop in and use the computers and equipment to teach themselves how to edit video, design websites or screen films at open evenings.

Bridgwater Fair normally takes place in September, starting on the last Wednesday in September and running for four days. The fair, now a funfair, takes place on St Matthew's Field which is known locally as the Fair Field. The fair was recorded in 1249 and in 1587, originally on and around St Matthew's day (21 September) which gave the venue its name, it was later changed to the four days starting on the last Wednesday in September.

=== Bridgwater carnival ===
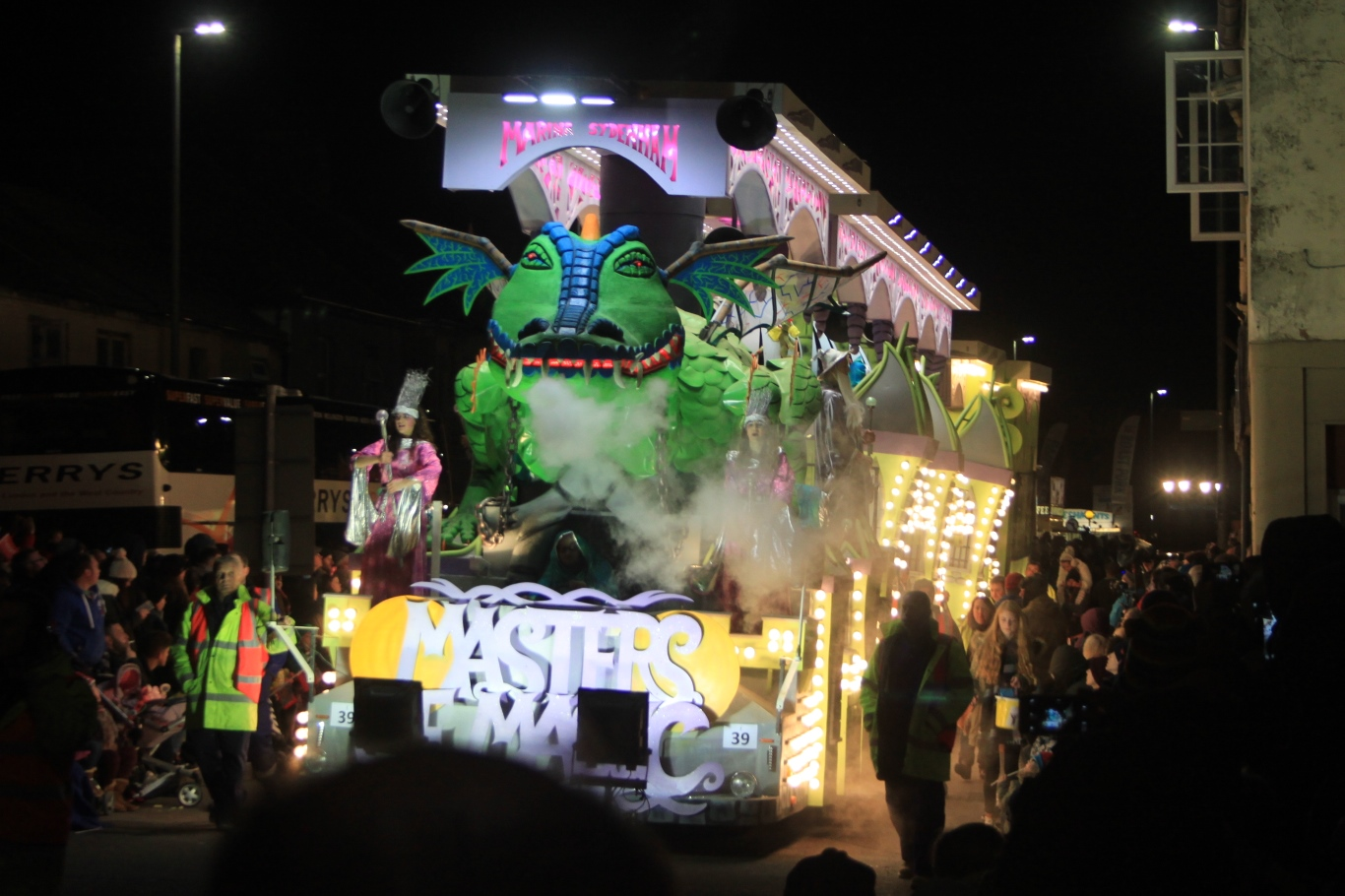
A cart in the 2016 carnival

Bridgwater Carnival is held each November on the Saturday nearest Guy Fawkes Night. It is the largest of the many West Country Carnivals, attracting around 150,000 people to the town. The carnival parade follows a 2.5-mile (4.0 km) route over 2 to 3 hours and features more than 100 entries. Many of these are large vehicles (known as 'carts') up to 100 feet (30 m) long with sometimes as many as 22,000 lightbulbs. The carts carry dancers or people in static poses (known as 'tableaux') while other entrants ('masqueraders') walk around the route with the carts. (Note: The 2011 carnival had 118 entries, 57 of which were illuminated 'carts'.) After the parade there is a firing of large fireworks ('squibs') in the street outside the town hall, an activity known as 'squibbing'.

=== Cultural references ===
Castle Street was used as a location in the 1963 film Tom Jones.

A sailor who had sailed 'from Bridgwater with bricks' and found 'there was lice in that bunk in Bridgwater' features in James Joyce's Ulysses.

=== Twinning ===
Bridgwater is twinned with the following towns and cities:

- Uherské Hradiště, in the Czech Republic, since 1992
- La Ciotat in France, since 1957
- Homberg, Efze in Germany, since 1992
- Marsa in Malta, since 2006
- Priverno in Italy, since 2015
- Camacha in Madeira, Portugal, since 2019

=== Media ===
Local television news programmes are BBC Points West and ITV News West Country.

The BBC local radio station covering Bridgwater is BBC Radio Somerset. Sedgemoor FM is a local community radio station.

== Sport and leisure ==
Bridgwater United Football Club is the town's football club. The first Bridgwater A.F.C. was founded in 1898. It closed in 1902 but was reformed in 1904 and renamed Bridgwater Town F.C. in 1921. It merged with the Yeovil United Women's Football Club in March 2021 when it became Bridgwater United. It plays at Fairfax Park.

Rugby union club Bridgwater & Albion's ground is at College Way off the Bath Road. It has senior, junior and women's teams. The Bridgwater Cricket Club has both senior and junior teams based at College Way.

Bridgwater's swimming pool is now at Chilton trinity; and it opened in 2013. The town's first swimming pool opened in 1890 in Old Taunton Road. This was replaced by the Bridgwater Lido on Broadway in 1960. This, in turn was replaced by the indoor water park, Sedgemoor Splash, in Mount Street. The 'Splash, officially opened by Diana, Princess of Wales on 16 April 1991, contained: several swimming pools; a fully-enclosed spiraling water slide, which went out through the building wall at a high level before spiraling down and re-entering through the building wall at a lower level; wave machines; paddle machines; and palm trees. Some 18 years later, it needed to be upgraded but the local council were unable to raise the funds needed and it closed in 2009. In 2016, the 'Splash' buildings were demolished, and the cleared site became a car park. It was intended to sell it for redevelopment as a new supermarket, with the site-sale money being used to fund a new pool.

== Notable people ==
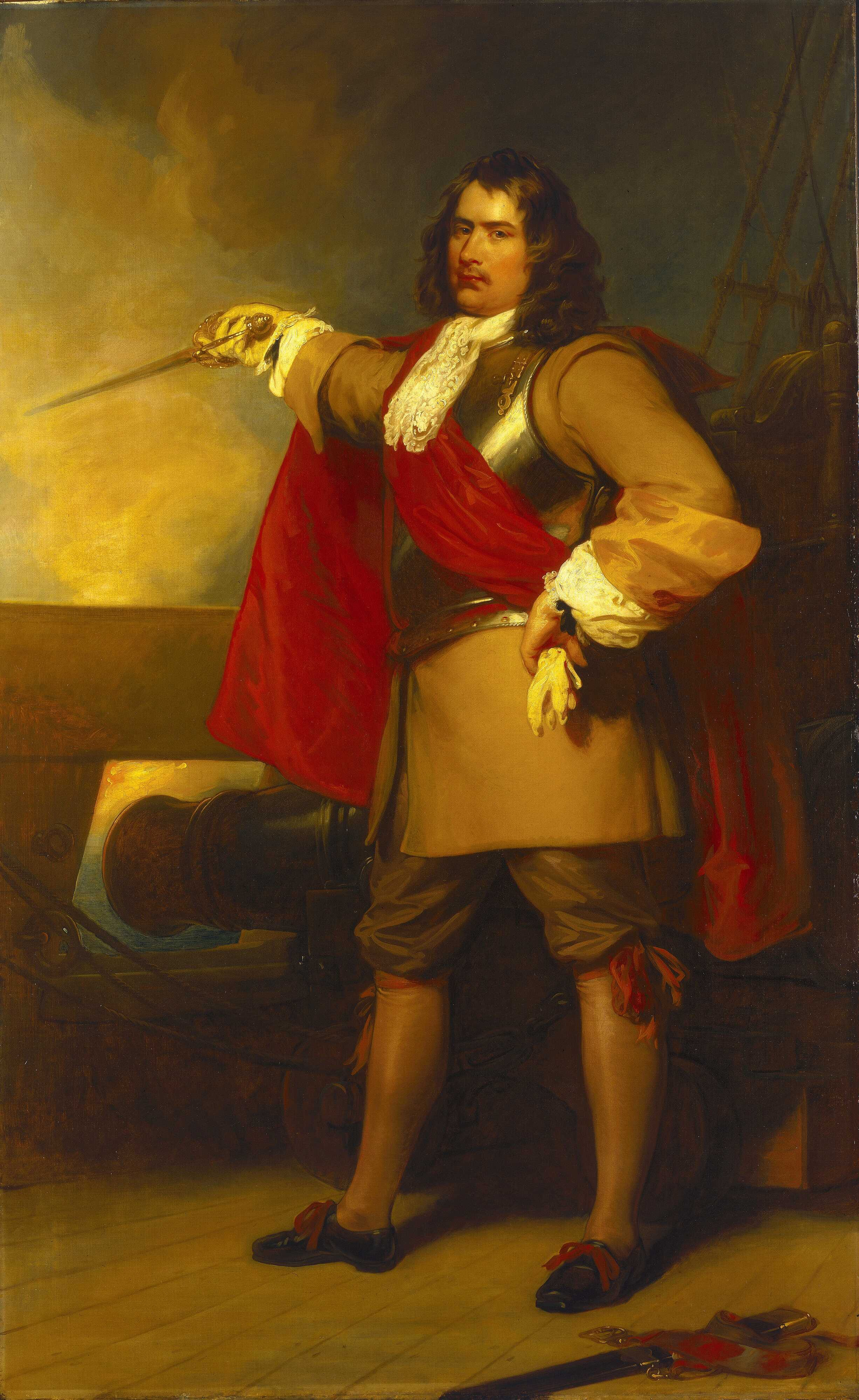
Admiral Robert Blake

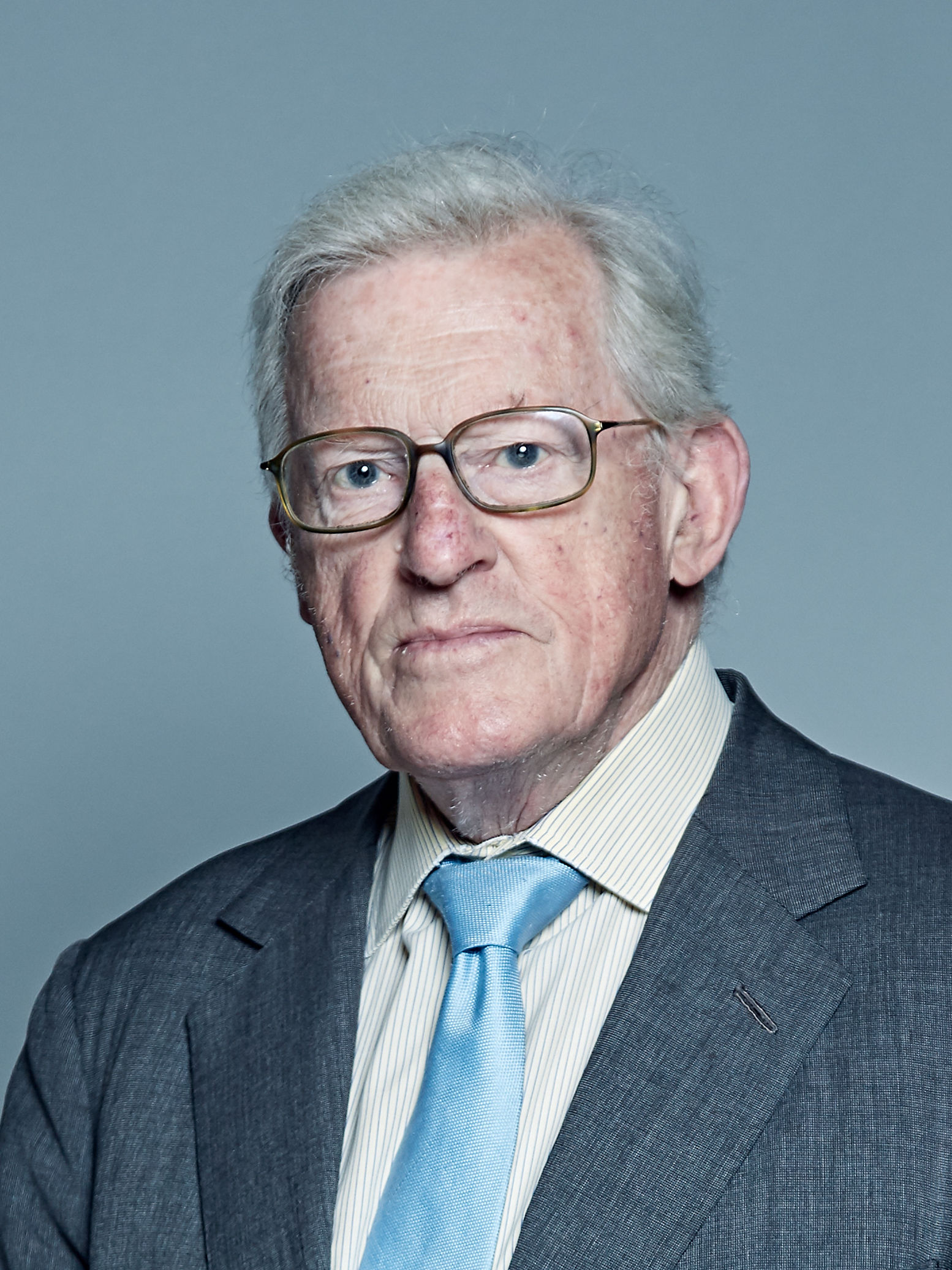
Tom King, Baron King of Bridgwater

- John de Ponz or John of Bridgwater (c.1248-c.1307), royal administrator and senior judge in Ireland.
- Admiral Robert Blake (1598–1657), admiral and general at sea.
- William Diaper (1685–1717), clergyman and innovative poet.
- John Chubb (1746–1818), Bridgwater merchant and amateur artist, who painted portraits of his local contemporaries and street scenes. His work is kept at the Blake Museum, Bridgwater.
- Sir Davidge Gould (1758–1847), an admiral in the Royal Navy.
- Andrew Plimer (1763–1837), artist, whose brother was Nathaniel Plimer, also a painter of miniatures.
- Henry Phillpotts (1778–1869), Bishop of Exeter 1830–1869.
- Horace Smith (1779–1849), poet and novelist.
- John Clark (1785–1853) created the first automated text generator, The Eureka, exhibited in 1845.
- George Trevor (1809–1888), an English divine and writer on divinity matters.
- Fanny Talbot (1824–1917), philanthropist, donor of the first property to National Trust.
- James Sully (1842–1923), psychologist philosopher and writer.
- Alexander Scoles (1844–1920), Roman Catholic priest and architect of Catholic churches: he served as parish priest in Bridgwater and designed and built St Joseph's church, Binford Place.
- Annie Leigh Browne (1851–1936), educationist and suffragist.
- Thomazine Mary Lockyer (1852-1943), astronomer, suffragist, and Unitarian.
- Catherine Osler (1854–1924), social reformer and suffragist.
- Harry "Breaker" Morant (1864–1902), soldier in the Second Boer War and war criminal.
- Walter Farthing (1887–1954), politician, local Mayor, 1939/40, and MP 1945/1950.
- Sir Paul Dukes (1889–1967) educated at Caterham School, and went on to be an SIS agent.
- Jean Rees (1914–2004), artist and co-founder of the Bridgwater Arts Centre.
- John Biffen (1930–2007), politician, MP for North Shropshire from 1961 to 1997.
- Donald Crowhurst (1932–1969), who tried to fake a round-the-world solo yacht journey, set up his business in Bridgwater and was a borough councillor.
- Peter Haggett (1933-2025), born in Bridgwater, an academic geographer and professor at University of Bristol.
- Tom King, Baron King of Bridgwater (born 1933), Conservative Member of Parliament (MP) for the Bridgwater constituency for thirty years, from 1970 to 2001. As an MP, he held various Secretary of State roles: Environment Secretary, Transport Secretary, Employment Secretary and Northern Ireland Secretary. He retired from the House of Commons during the 2001 General Election and joined the House of Lords, in 2001 as Life peer: Baron King of Bridgwater.
- Carol Lee Scott (1942-2017), entertainer, played the antagonist Grotbags.
- Chris Harris (1942–2014), actor, writer and pantomime dame.
- Neil Parish (born 1956), farmer and former politician, MP, 2010 to 2022.

=== Sports people ===
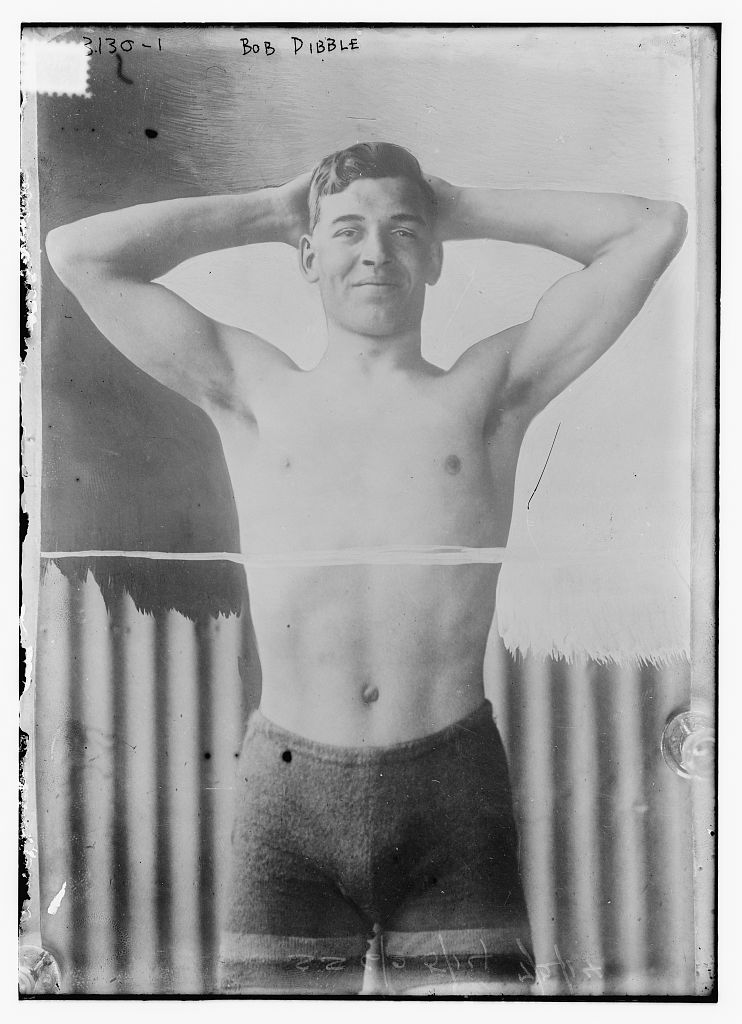
Robert Dibble, ca.1914

- Robert Dibble (1882–1963), international rugby player, born in Bridgwater and played for Bridgwater & Albion.
- Tommy Woods (1883–1955), rugby player, played for Bridgwater & Albion & Rochdale Hornets.
- Elizabeth Ferris (1940–2012), diver, bronze medallist, 3 metre springboard, 1960 Summer Olympics.
- Charles Kent (1953–2005), rugby player, played for Bridgwater & Albion.
- Richard Harden (born 1965), cricketer, played 253 First-class cricket games.
- David Luckes (born 1969), field hockey goalkeeper and Olympian.
- Richard Mantell (born 1981) and his brother Simon Mantell (born 1984) played field hockey for the England men's national field hockey team.
- Matthew Villis (born 1984), footballer, played over 260 games including 101 for Weston-super-Mare A.F.C..

== See also ==
- Earls of Bridgewater
