= Sedgemoor District Council =

Non-metropolitan district council in Somerset, England

Sedgemoor District Council was a local government district in Somerset, England covering the Sedgemoor district. It was established in 1974 by the merger of Bridgwater and Burnham-on-Sea Urban District Councils along with Axbridge Rural District Council. It was replaced on 1 April 2023 by Somerset Council.

== Political control ==
Past voting trends have placed strong cores of Labour voters in Bridgwater Town, with Conservative support coming from the Villages such as Pawlett, Wedmore and Shipham. Liberal Democrats fared well in Burnham and Highbridge areas. In 1995, the Liberal Democrats and Labour took 26 seats together, out-numbering the Conservatives 24 seats, and they formed a coalition. This continued until 1999, when the Conservatives re-took Sedgemoor, crushing the Liberal Democrats from 12 seats, to just 2. The Liberal Democrats lost even their safe seat of Highbridge to Labour.

In 2000, a Conservative councillor died, and a by-election was called in his seat of Huntpsill and Pawlett. Previous Liberal Democrat councillor Marilyn Wallace fought the seat, and re-took it with 56% of the vote, bringing the Liberal Democrats back up to three seats.

In 2003, the Conservatives extended their majority to 35 seats of 50, leaving the Liberal Democrats on just one seat, which was held by Liberal Democrat, Mike Mansfield, who actually took the seat from the Conservatives in Burnham South, a previously Liberal Democrat safe seat. Labour remained on 14.

In 2007, the Conservatives held a status quo of 35 seats, however the Liberal Democrats gained three up to four total, all of which were in their traditional safe seat of Highbridge. Mike Mansfield was elected Leader of the Liberal Democrat group, until the untimely death of his wife. Newly elected Danny Titcombe then was elected leader of the Group. on 14 April 2008, Danny Titcombe announced his defection to the Conservative Party, effectively boosting their majority to 36 seats. Despite calls of resignation from all sides, Titcombe continued in his role. The Labour Party dropped to 11 seats, losing two in highbridge to the Liberal Democrats, and one in Bridgwater Bower to the Conservatives. The Conservatives lost 1 in Highbridge to the Liberal Democrats (before defection). In 2010, Woolavington councillor Roger Lavers, who was the Labour Group Leader, died suddenly of a brain haemorrhage, triggering a by-election in the 1 Member ward, which saw Labour drop from holding the seat, to third behind the Liberal Democrats who hadn't stood in the seat since 1991, and the Conservatives gain the seat, boosting their total number to 37 of 50 councillors. Labour dropped to 10. Kathy Pearce, Labour member for Bridgwater Hamp, was elected as the new Labour group leader.

In the 2011 Local Council elections, the Conservatives held the council with a reduced number of seats. Labour took back all Bridgwater seats except the Windham ward, and the Independents gained 2 seats at the expense of the Liberal Democrats, who held their leader's seat in Highbridge & Burnham Marine, and Burnham Central.

The last leader of Sedgemoor District Council was Duncan McGinty, who had held the position since 1999.

== Abolition ==
On 1 April 2023 the council was abolished and replaced by Somerset Council, a unitary authority for the area previously served by Somerset County Council. Elections for the new council took place in May 2022. It was run alongside Sedgemoor and the other councils until their abolition.
