= Grade II* listed buildings in Sedgemoor =

Sedgemoor shown within the ceremonial county of Somerset

Sedgemoor is a former local government district in the English county of Somerset. In the United Kingdom, the term listed building refers to a building or other structure officially designated as being of special architectural, historical or cultural significance; Grade II* structures are those considered to be "particularly significant buildings of more than local interest". Listing was begun by a provision in the Town and Country Planning Act 1947. Once listed, severe restrictions are imposed on the modifications allowed to a building's structure or its fittings. In England, the authority for listing under the Planning (Listed Buildings and Conservation Areas) Act 1990 rests with Historic England, a non-departmental public body sponsored by the Department for Digital, Culture, Media and Sport; local authorities have a responsibility to regulate and enforce the planning regulations.

Sedgemoor is a low-lying area of land close to sea level between the Quantock and Mendip hills, historically largely marsh (or moor). It contains the bulk of the area also known as the Somerset Levels, including one of Europe's oldest known engineered roadways, the Sweet Track.

There are 90 Grade II* listed buildings in Sedgemoor. The oldest buildings in the list are Anglo-Saxon and Norman churches, with many more churches and churchyard crosses from the Middle Ages. There are also medieval country houses and the remains of castles. Urban architecture is represented by King Square in Bridgwater. Industrial buildings include Ashton Windmill which was built in the 18th century, on a site which has been the location of a windmill since the medieval period. In Bridgwater the Chandos Glass Cone and Brick Kiln are parts of its industrial history. Related transport structures include Bridgwater railway station and the Telescopic Bridge carrying the railway over the River Parrett. The history of the drainage of the Somerset Levels is on display at the Westonzoyland Pumping Station Museum. One of the first buildings to make extensive use of Portland cement for pre-cast concrete was Castle House in Bridgwater which was built in 1851. Decorative work in Bridgwater is also represented with the inclusion of the Blake Statue and War Memorial.

== Buildings ==
Name	Location	Type	Completed (Note: The date given is the date used by Historic England as significant for the initial building or that of an important part in the structure's description.)	Grid ref. (Note: Sometimes known as OSGB36, the grid reference is based on the British national grid reference system used by the Ordnance Survey.) Geo-coordinates	Entry number (Note: The "List Entry Number" is a unique number assigned to each listed building and scheduled monument by Historic England.)	Image	Ref.
Ashton Windmill	Chapel Allerton	Windmill	18th century	ST414502; 51°14′56″N 2°50′24″W	1173522	Ashton Windmill More images	
King John's Hunting Lodge (Axbridge Museum)	Axbridge	House	Early 16th century	ST430545; 51°17′14″N 2°49′03″W	1059142	King John's Hunting Lodge (Axbridge Museum) More images	
Baptist Church	Bridgwater	Church	c. 1837	ST297369; 51°07′38″N 3°00′17″W	1298798	Baptist Church More images	
Barford House and outbuilding wing at rear	Enmore	Farmhouse	c. 1710	ST233358; 51°07′02″N 3°05′47″W	1058941	Barford House and outbuilding wing at rear More images	
Beere Manor Farmhouse and attached barn	Cannington	Cross passage house	16th or 17th century	ST240414; 51°10′01″N 3°05′15″W	1059062	Upload Photo	
Blake Statue	Bridgwater	Statue	1898	ST298370; 51°07′42″N 3°00′13″W	1205747	Blake Statue More images	
Boomer Farmhouse	North Petherton	Farmhouse	1681	ST277328; 51°05′27″N 3°01′59″W	1344987	Boomer Farmhouse More images	
Brick Kiln	Bridgwater	Kiln	19th century	ST299376; 51°08′01″N 3°00′07″W	1206110	Brick Kiln More images	
Bridgwater Railway Station	Bridgwater	Bridge	1841	ST307369; 51°07′40″N 2°59′25″W	1187364	Bridgwater Railway Station More images	
Castle House	Bridgwater	House	1851	ST299371; 51°07′45″N 3°00′07″W	1355168	Castle House More images	
Castle House with adjoining wings & Gate Cottage	Enmore	House	18th century	ST243348; 51°06′30″N 3°04′53″W	1177302	Castle House with adjoining wings & Gate Cottage More images	
Castle wall, watergate and undercroft	Bridgwater	Curtain wall	13th century	ST299372; 51°07′48″N 3°00′07″W	1207427	Upload Photo	
Christ Church Unitarian Chapel	Bridgwater	Schoolroom	19th century	ST299369; 51°07′38″N 3°00′08″W	1197371	Christ Church Unitarian Chapel More images	
Church Cross in churchyard, 10 metres south of Church of St Andrew	Compton Bishop	Cross	15th century	ST395553; 51°17′39″N 2°52′04″W	1344903	Church Cross in churchyard, 10 metres south of Church of St Andrew More images	
Church Farm House and Church Farmhouse	Cheddar	Farmhouse	15th century	ST460530; 51°16′25″N 2°46′31″W	1344877	Upload Photo	
Church of All Saints	Ashcott	Church	15th century	ST437371; 51°07′51″N 2°48′21″W	1058957	Church of All Saints More images	
Church of All Saints	Otterhampton	Church	12th century	ST246431; 51°10′59″N 3°04′47″W	1344927	Church of All Saints More images	
Church of All Saints	Aisholt	Church	14th century	ST193356; 51°06′51″N 3°09′12″W	1178112	Church of All Saints More images	
Church of St Bridget	Brean	Church	13th century	ST296559; 51°17′54″N 3°00′36″W	1262963	Church of St Bridget More images	
Church of St Giles	Thurloxton	Church	14th and 15th century	ST274304; 51°04′07″N 3°02′12″W	1295089	Church of St Giles More images	
Church of St John the Baptist	Biddisham	Church	13th century	ST381534; 51°16′36″N 2°53′15″W	1059138	Church of St John the Baptist More images	
Church of St John the Baptist	Bridgwater	Church	1843	ST303373; 51°07′52″N 2°59′49″W	1197354	Church of St John the Baptist More images	
Church of St Martin	Fiddington	Church	11th century	ST215405; 51°09′33″N 3°07′23″W	1264213	Church of St Martin More images	
Church of St Mary	Cossington	Church	13th century	ST356402; 51°09′29″N 2°55′17″W	1344698	Church of St Mary More images	
Church of St Mary the Virgin	Nether Stowey	Church	15th century	ST196396; 51°09′01″N 3°08′59″W	1344922	Church of St Mary the Virgin More images	
Church of St Michael	Enmore	Church	19th century	ST239352; 51°06′40″N 3°05′14″W	1177223	Church of St Michael More images	
Church of St Michael and All Angels	Bawdrip	Church	13th century	ST341395; 51°09′06″N 2°56′34″W	1060158	Church of St Michael and All Angels More images	
Church of St Michael and All Angels	Rowberrow	Church	14th century	ST449586; 51°19′26″N 2°47′29″W	1296019	Church of St Michael and All Angels More images	
Church of St Peter	North Newton	Church	Saxon	ST301311; 51°04′31″N 2°59′56″W	1058917	Church of St Peter More images	
Church of St Peter and St Paul, Over Stowey	Over Stowey	Church	1840	ST185385; 51°08′24″N 3°09′56″W	1060177	Church of St Peter and St Paul, Over Stowey More images	
Church of the Blessed Virgin Mary	Shapwick	Church	1331	ST417382; 51°08′26″N 2°50′01″W	1058962	Church of the Blessed Virgin Mary More images	
Church of the Holy Trinity	Chilton Trinity	Church	13th century	ST296391; 51°08′51″N 3°00′26″W	1264231	Church of the Holy Trinity More images	
Churchyard Cross in churchyard approximately 10 metres south of nave, Church of St Gregory	Weare	Cross	15th century	ST414526; 51°16′13″N 2°50′28″W	1059090	Churchyard Cross in churchyard approximately 10 metres south of nave, Church of St Gregory More images	
Churchyard Cross in churchyard, 30 metres east of East End, Church of St Mary	Wedmore	Cross	15th century	ST435479; 51°13′40″N 2°48′37″W	1252634	Churchyard Cross in churchyard, 30 metres east of East End, Church of St Mary More images	
Churchyard Cross	Broomfield	Cross	13th century	ST224320; 51°04′56″N 3°06′31″W	1058938	Churchyard Cross More images	
Churchyard Cross in churchyard, Church of St Michael	Enmore	Cross	15th century	ST239351; 51°06′40″N 3°05′14″W	1344998	Churchyard Cross in churchyard, Church of St Michael More images	
Churchyard Cross, in churchyard, 5 metres south of South Porch, Church of St John the Baptist	Biddisham	Cross	Late 14th century	ST381534; 51°16′36″N 2°53′15″W	1173427	Churchyard Cross, in churchyard, 5 metres south of South Porch, Church of St John the Baptist	
Clerks Cottage	Spaxton	House	16th or 17th century	ST231361; 51°07′08″N 3°06′00″W	1344669	Upload Photo	
Coleridge's Cottage	Nether Stowey	House	17th century	ST191398; 51°09′08″N 3°09′29″W	1344921	Coleridge's Cottage More images	
Compton House and Forecourt Railings	Axbridge	Manor house	Early 17th century	ST426546; 51°17′16″N 2°49′26″W	1173405	Compton House and Forecourt Railings More images	
County Court Office	Bridgwater	Office	1824	ST299371; 51°07′45″N 3°00′09″W	1197407	County Court Office More images	
Court House Farmhouse	Spaxton	Farmhouse	15th or 16th century	ST225370; 51°07′40″N 3°06′31″W	1344667	Court House Farmhouse More images	
Crosse Family Monument in churchyard about 1 metre south of nave, Church of St Mary and All Saints	Broomfield	Chest tomb	1653	ST224320; 51°04′56″N 3°06′32″W	1344997	Upload Photo	
Dovecote in grounds of Shapwick Manor	Shapwick	Dovecote	Medieval	ST417383; 51°08′30″N 2°50′01″W	1190558	Dovecote in grounds of Shapwick Manor	
Durleigh Church	Durleigh	Church	11th century	ST274361; 51°07′12″N 3°02′15″W	1177147	Durleigh Church More images	
Edington House	Edington	Farmhouse	c. 1640	ST385396; 51°09′09″N 2°52′49″W	1344661	Upload Photo	
Farm Estate Farmhouse	Fiddington	Farmhouse	16th century	ST223417; 51°10′12″N 3°06′46″W	1237276	Upload Photo	
Former Market Cross in churchyard, Church of St Mark	Mark	Market cross	15th century	ST380478; 51°13′35″N 2°53′19″W	1252188	Former Market Cross in churchyard, Church of St Mark More images	
Gazebo and attached walling bounding grounds of Stowey Court	Nether Stowey	Gate	Early 18th century	ST195396; 51°09′00″N 3°09′06″W	1264119	Gazebo and attached walling bounding grounds of Stowey Court More images	
Great House Farmhouse and flanking walls	Wedmore	Farmhouse	1670	ST453464; 51°12′53″N 2°47′00″W	1252915	Upload Photo	
Legion House and attached wall to right	Bridgwater	Terrace	Mid 18th century	ST299371; 51°07′45″N 3°00′10″W	1280623	Legion House and attached wall to right More images	
Manor House	Lympsham	Manor house	Mid 18th century	ST334542; 51°17′00″N 2°57′20″W	1262680	Upload Photo	
Market Cross	Cheddar	Market cross	15th century	ST459532; 51°16′31″N 2°46′36″W	1173642	Market Cross More images	
Maunsel House	North Petherton	House	Later 15th century	ST304300; 51°03′55″N 2°59′38″W	1177930	Maunsel House More images	
No 10 King Square and attached railings	Bridgwater	House	Late 18th or early 19th century	ST298371; 51°07′47″N 3°00′13″W	1297163	No 10 King Square and attached railings	
No 13 King Square and attached railings	Bridgwater	House	c. 1770–1800	ST2987337198; 51°07′47″N 3°00′13″W	1197394	No 13 King Square and attached railings	
No 14 King Square and attached railings	Bridgwater	House	c. 1770–1800	ST298372; 51°07′47″N 3°00′13″W	1280095	No 14 King Square and attached railings	
No 15 Frian Street and attached front railings and rear garden walls	Bridgwater	Town house	c. 1700	ST298368; 51°07′36″N 3°00′13″W	1297157	Upload Photo	
9 High Street	Axbridge	Timber framed house	15th or 16th century	ST430545; 51°17′14″N 2°49′05″W	1344893	9 High Street	
45 and 47 St Mary Street	Bridgwater	House	14th century	ST297369; 51°07′39″N 3°00′18″W	1052245	45 and 47 St Mary Street	
1 King Square	Bridgwater	House	c. 1770–1800	ST298371; 51°07′45″N 3°00′14″W	1197393	1 King Square	
10 and 11, West Quay	Bridgwater	House	Early/mid 18th century	ST299372; 51°07′47″N 3°00′07″W	1197421	10 and 11, West Quay More images	
3–9 Chandos Street	Bridgwater	Terrace	Early 18th century	ST299372; 51°07′48″N 3°00′10″W	1205624	3–9 Chandos Street	
8 and 9 King Square	Bridgwater	Terrace	c. 1770–1800	ST298371; 51°07′46″N 3°00′13″W	1206644	8 and 9 King Square	
2–7 King Square	Bridgwater	Terrace	c. 1770–1800	ST298371; 51°07′45″N 3°00′13″W	1280107	2–7 King Square	
Nos 11 and 12 King Square and attached railings	Bridgwater	Terrace	c. 1770–1800	ST298371; 51°07′47″N 3°00′13″W	1206669	Nos 11 and 12 King Square and attached railings	
Nos 16 and 17 King Square and attached railings	Bridgwater	House	c. 1770–1800	ST298372; 51°07′47″N 3°00′16″W	1297164	Nos 16 and 17 King Square and attached railings	
Old Manor House	Axbridge	Manor house	Early 17th century	ST430545; 51°17′14″N 2°49′07″W	1059147	Old Manor House	
Patcombe Farmhouse including chimney stack adjoining south east	Broomfield	House	1771	ST247333; 51°05′41″N 3°04′31″W	1060152	Upload Photo	
Paulet House (formerly known as Church Close)	Goathurst	House	15th century	ST256343; 51°06′14″N 3°03′47″W	1058949	Upload Photo	
Rail Bridge over the River Parrett	Bridgwater	Railway bridge	1871	ST299374; 51°07′54″N 3°00′06″W	1297139	Rail Bridge over the River Parrett More images	
Remains of Churchyard Cross in churchyard, about 23 metres north of North Aisle, Church of St Mary	North Petherton	Cross	15th century	ST290330; 51°05′32″N 3°00′53″W	1344990	Upload Photo	
Roadside Cross at Ngr St 4248 4966 (Stoughton Cross)	Wedmore	Wayside cross	15th century	ST424496; 51°14′36″N 2°49′31″W	1252914	Roadside Cross at Ngr St 4248 4966 (Stoughton Cross) More images	
Robin Hood's Hut	Goathurst	Kitchen	1765	ST254333; 51°05′40″N 3°03′58″W	1060155	Robin Hood's Hut More images	
Shapwick House Hotel: The Granary	Shapwick	House	1630	ST416387; 51°08′43″N 2°50′06″W	1190480	Shapwick House Hotel: The Granary	
Shapwick Manor	Shapwick	Manor house	Medieval	ST417384; 51°08′32″N 2°50′03″W	1190512	Shapwick Manor More images	
St Judes	Axbridge	House	Late 15th century	ST430545; 51°17′14″N 2°49′06″W	1344894	St Judes More images	
St Michael's Cheshire Home	Axbridge	House	Late 19th century	ST440548; 51°17′23″N 2°48′12″W	1425501	Upload Photo	
Stable block with coach house to Shapwick Manor	Shapwick	Stable	Mid 17th century	ST417384; 51°08′33″N 2°50′00″W	1344994	Upload Photo	
Stawell Church	Stawell	Church	13th century	ST368382; 51°08′25″N 2°54′17″W	1174228	Stawell Church More images	
Stone screen and flanking sections of walling enclosing former parterre on frontage of Shapwick Manor	Shapwick	Gate	17th century	ST417384; 51°08′32″N 2°50′02″W	1293774	Upload Photo	
Temple of Harmony	Goathurst	Garden temple	1767	ST251342; 51°06′08″N 3°04′14″W	1058952	Temple of Harmony More images	
Blake Museum	Bridgwater	House	Late 15th or early 16th century	ST300368; 51°07′38″N 3°00′06″W	1205363	Blake Museum More images	
The Old Angel	Axbridge	House	c. 1550	ST431545; 51°17′15″N 2°49′02″W	1344883	The Old Angel More images	
Tirelands Farmhouse	Enmore	Farmhouse	15th century	ST241345; 51°06′19″N 3°05′05″W	1177211	Upload Photo	
West Bower Manor with barn	Durleigh	Farmhouse	15th century	ST265364; 51°07′20″N 3°03′03″W	1058940	West Bower Manor with barn More images	
West Newton Manor with barn	North Petherton	Farmhouse	c. 1346	ST288291; 51°03′26″N 3°00′57″W	1344642	Upload Photo	
Westonzoyland Engine Trust Old Pumping Station	Westonzoyland	Engine house	Early 19th century	ST339328; 51°05′28″N 2°56′40″W	1174295	Westonzoyland Engine Trust Old Pumping Station More images	
Willis Family Monument	Goathurst	Chest tomb	1765	ST256343; 51°06′12″N 3°03′48″W	1344967	Upload Photo	
World War Memorial	Bridgwater	Statue	1920s	ST298371; 51°07′47″N 3°00′14″W	1197395	World War Memorial More images	

== See also ==
- Grade II* listed buildings in Somerset
- Grade I listed buildings in Sedgemoor
