= Church of St Mary the Virgin, Nether Stowey =

Church in Somerset, England

Church of St Mary the Virgin
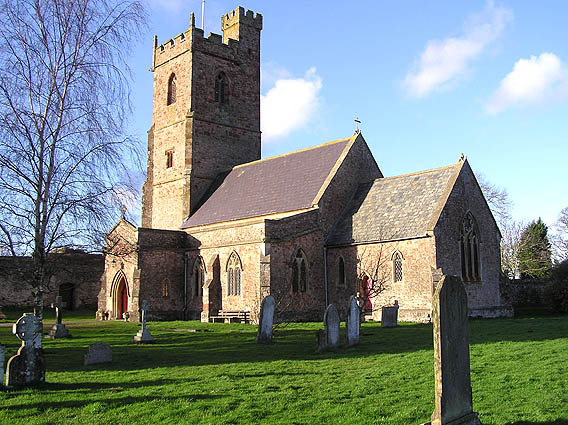

- Location within Somerset
- 51.1503°N 3.1498°W
- Location: Nether Stowey, Somerset, England

Listed Building – Grade II*
- Official name: Church of St Mary the Virgin
- Designated: 29 March 1963
- Reference no.: 1344922

The Anglican Church of St Mary the Virgin in Nether Stowey in the English county of Somerset has a 15th-century tower, with the remainder of the church being rebuilt in 1851 by Richard Carver and Charles Edmund Giles. It is as a Grade II* listed building.

== History ==
Nether Stowey had a small church by the 12th century with a three-bay nave. A gallery was added in the early 17th century. In 1791 a failed attempt was made to enlarge the church, but in 1814 a transept was added.

The parish is part of the Quantock Villages benefice of Aisholt, Enmore, Goathurst, Nether Stowey, Over Stowey and Spaxton within the Diocese of Bath and Wells.

== Architecture ==
The red sandstone church now has a nave, north and south aisles and a chancel with attached vestry. The three-stage west tower is supported by diagonal buttresses and decorated with pinnacles and prominent gargoyles. The tower contains six bells which were recast in 1914.

== See also ==
- List of ecclesiastical parishes in the Diocese of Bath and Wells
