= Church of St Michael, Enmore =

Church in Somerset, England

Church of St Michael
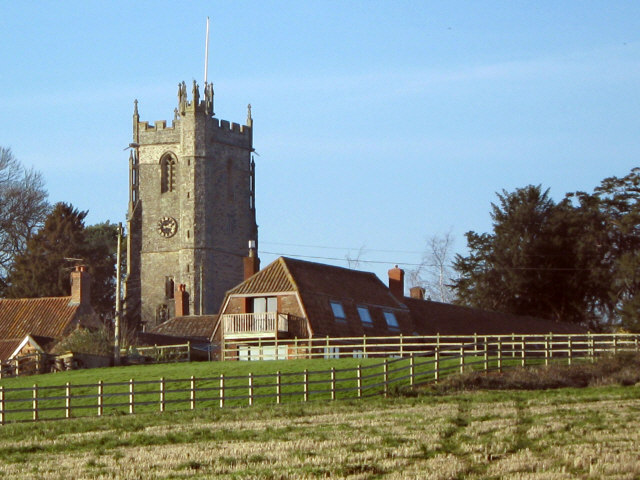

- Location within Somerset
- 51°06′40″N 3°05′14″W
- Location: Enmore, Somerset, England

History
- Built: 13th and 15th centuries

Listed Building – Grade II*
- Official name: Church of St Michael
- Designated: 29 March 1963
- Reference no.: 1177223

The Anglican Church of St Michael in Enmore within the English county of Somerset dates mainly from the 15th century, however some of the fabric of the building from the 12th century, including an arched doorway, survives. It is a Grade II* listed building.

== History ==
The church was restored in 1873 by Benjamin Ferrey.

The parish is part of the benefice of Aisholt, Enmore, Goathurst, Nether Stowey, Over Stowey and Spaxton with Charlynch which falls within the archdeaconry of Taunton.

== Architecture ==
The church has a three bay north aisle, two bay chancel and a two bay nave accessed via the south doorway which was built around 1185. The heavy doorway dating from around 1185 is an ornately carved archway.

The three-stage west tower is supported by diagonal buttresses and topped with a turret above the stairs. It contains six bells the oldest of which was cast in 1647 by William Purdue.

== Interior ==
Inside the church are a 13th-century octagonal font, and jacobean pulpit. There are also various chests ranging in date from the Middle Ages to the 19th century.

There are two helms from the family of William Malet who were the lords of the manor and Sheriffs of Somerset. These are believed to date from around 1620 so they would date from the time of John Malet. They were discovered when parts of Enmore Castle were demolished in 1833 and moved to the church.

== Churchyard ==
In the churchyard is a 15th-century cross. The shaft is 1.5 metres (4 ft 11 in) high, however the head of the cross is missing. The wall around the churchyard which separates it from Enmore Castle was probably built in the 18th century.

The monuments include the Studdier, and Waterman family monuments. There are also some unidentified chest tombs. One dating from the early 18th century, and one from the 17th.

== See also ==
- List of ecclesiastical parishes in the Diocese of Bath and Wells
