= Grade II* listed buildings in Somerset =

Unitary authorities of Somerset

1 Somerset Council
2 North Somerset
3 Bath and North East Somerset

The ceremonial county of Somerset is administered by three unitary authorities. Two of the unitary authorities were established on 1 April 1996 following the breakup of the county of Avon, are North Somerset and Bath and North East Somerset. These unitary authorities include areas that were once part of Somerset before the creation of Avon in 1974.

The rest of the county is administered by Somerset Council which was established on 1 April 2023 replacing the former Somerset County Council and four districts, South Somerset, Mendip, Sedgemoor and Somerset West and Taunton. West Somerset and Taunton Deane previously existed until 1 April 2019 when they merged to form Somerset West and Taunton.

In the United Kingdom, the term listed building refers to a building or other structure officially designated as being of special architectural, historical, or cultural significance; Grade I structures are those considered to be "buildings of exceptional interest". Listing was begun by a provision in the Town and Country Planning Act 1947. Once listed, strict limitations are imposed on the modifications allowed to a building's structure or fittings. In England, the authority for listing under the Planning (Listed Buildings and Conservation Areas) Act 1990 rests with English Heritage, a non-departmental public body sponsored by the Department for Digital, Culture, Media and Sport; local authorities have a responsibility to regulate and enforce the planning regulations.

Grade II* structures are those considered to be "particularly significant buildings of more than local interest".

As there are 1073 Grade II* listed buildings in the county they have been split into separate lists for each district or former district.

- Grade II* listed buildings in Bath and North East Somerset – 212 entries
- Grade II* listed buildings in North Somerset – 79 entries
- Grade II* listed buildings in Mendip – 210 entries
- Grade II* listed buildings in Sedgemoor – 88 entries
- Grade II* listed buildings in South Somerset – 266 entries
- Grade II* listed buildings in Taunton Deane – 118 entries
- Grade II* listed buildings in West Somerset – 100 entries

== See also ==
- Grade I listed buildings in Somerset
