= Enmore Park Golf Club =

Golf club in Somerset, England

Coordinates: 51.113°N 3.079°W

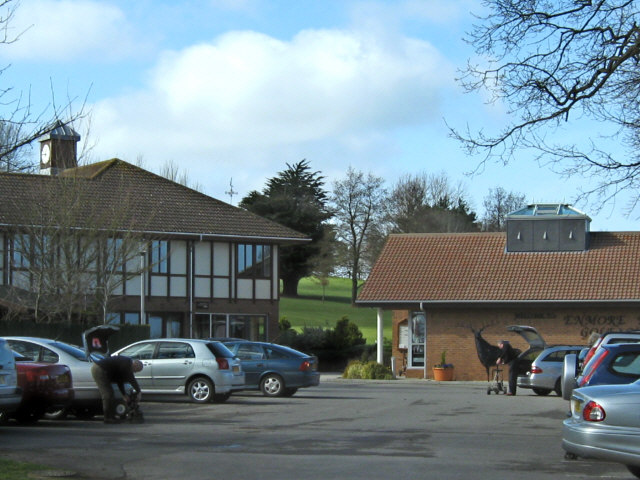
- Enmore Golf Club
- Interactive map of Enmore Park Golf Club

Club information
- Location: Enmore, Somerset, England
- Established: 1906
- Tota holes: 18
- Par: 71
- Length: 6411 yards

Enmore Park Golf Club is a golf club set within the Quantock hills, an area of outstanding natural beauty, and in the village of Enmore within the county of Somerset in England. It has a parkland course and has a total par of 71 over a medal tee yardage of 6411 yards.

== History ==
The club's origins can be dated back to Easter Monday of 1906, which formed the official opening of Cannington Park Golf Club, later to become Enmore Park Golf Club. The origins of the course were not in the village of Enmore but in the village of Cannington and consisted of a 9-hole course of par 38 and length of just over 2200 yards.

In 1932 at the annual general meeting, it was decided that lengthening of the course was needed, and as this was not possible at Cannington Park, a new location had to be found. The most suitable of these locations was Enmore Park, which is the current location of Enmore Park Golf Club. It is within the parklands once held by Enmore Castle. The new 9-hole course was officially opened at 3 o'clock on 24 September 1932.

The original plans for a transition to an 18-hole golf course were laid out before the Second World War. However, only 14 holes managed to be constructed before the start of the war, and during the early war years advancements to the course were suspended. Also during this period the golf club suffered financial difficulties and was forced to sell off some of the holes and returned to a nine-hole course.

It was not until 16 May 1972 that Enmore Park managed to obtain a capacity 18-hole golf course, which was officially opened on 10 June of the same year.

== Competitions ==
Enmore Park hosted the English Women's Amateur Stroke Play Championship in 2009.

Enmore Park along with Burnham & Berrow Golf Club was selected as the co-hosts of the 2011 R&A Boys Amateur Championship which was played between 9 and 14 August.

== The course ==
=== Card of the course ===
Hole	Name	White Yards	Yellow Yards	Men's Par	Men's Stroke Index	Red Yards	Women's Par	Women's Stroke Index
1	Jubilee	385	378	4	10	363	5	12
2	Church	146	142	3	16	124	3	18
3	Castle	369	362	4	6	345	4	6
4	Lapwing	337	311	4	14	304	4	10
5	Barford	411	401	4	2	342	4	2
6	Roughmoor	491	479	5	18	457	5	14
7	Kingfisher	179	170	3	4	158	3	8
8	The Barn	385	358	4	8	264	4	16
9	The Pond	408	376	4	12	355	4	4
Out		3111	2977	35		2712	36	
10	The Oak	437	430	4	1	420	5	3
11	Durleigh	471	466	4	7	390	5	13
12	Pheasant	218	202	3	3	182	3	11
13	Quantocks	375	364	4	11	345	4	1
14	The Lake	352	341	4	15	330	4	7
15	Heron	185	157	3	9	141	3	15
16	Wind Down	488	477	5	5	443	5	5
17	Quarry Copse	320	313	4	17	299	4	9
18	The Tor	496	491	5	13	421	5	17
In		3342	3241	36		2971	38	
Out		3111	2977	35		2712	36	
Total		6453	6248	71		5683	74	

=== Course record ===
The medal course record from the white tees is currently held at a gross 62, 9 under par and was set by Taylor Stote in 2018.
