= Church of St Michael and All Angels, Rowberrow =

Church in Somerset, England

Church of St Michael and All Angels
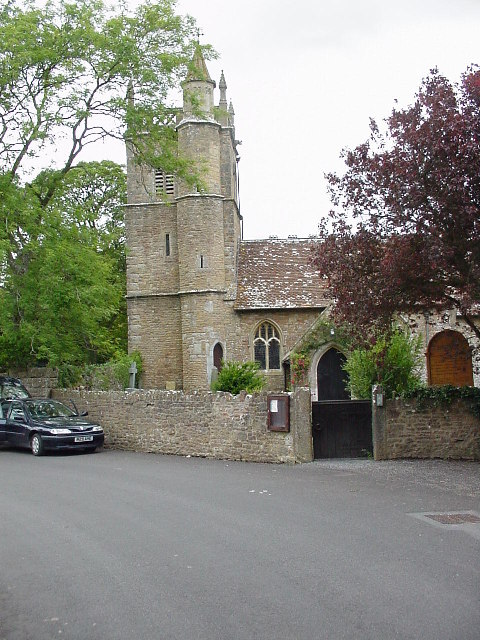

- Location within Somerset
- 51.3240°N 2.7915°W
- Location: Rowberrow, Somerset, England

Listed Building – Grade II*
- Official name: Church of St Michael and All Angels
- Designated: 9 February 1961
- Reference no.: 1296019

The Anglican Church of St Michael and All Angels at Rowberrow within the English county of Somerset dates from the 14th century, but parts were rebuilt in 1865. It is a Grade II* listed building.

== History ==
The church was originally built in the 14th century. The nave, chancel and porch underwent Victorian restoration and rebuilding work in 1865.

The parish is part of the benefice of Axbridge with Shipham and Rowberrow within the Diocese of Bath and Wells.

== Architecture ==
In addition to the two-bay nave and chancel there is a three-stage west tower. Inside the floor of the church is encaustic tiles. There is a font dating from the 14th century which is topped by a Jacobean cover. The fragment of a Saxon cross carved on the north wall of the chancel is a symbol of the link between royalty, local landowners and the church.

== See also ==
- List of ecclesiastical parishes in the Diocese of Bath and Wells
