= Bridgwater Castle =

- Bridgwater, Somerset
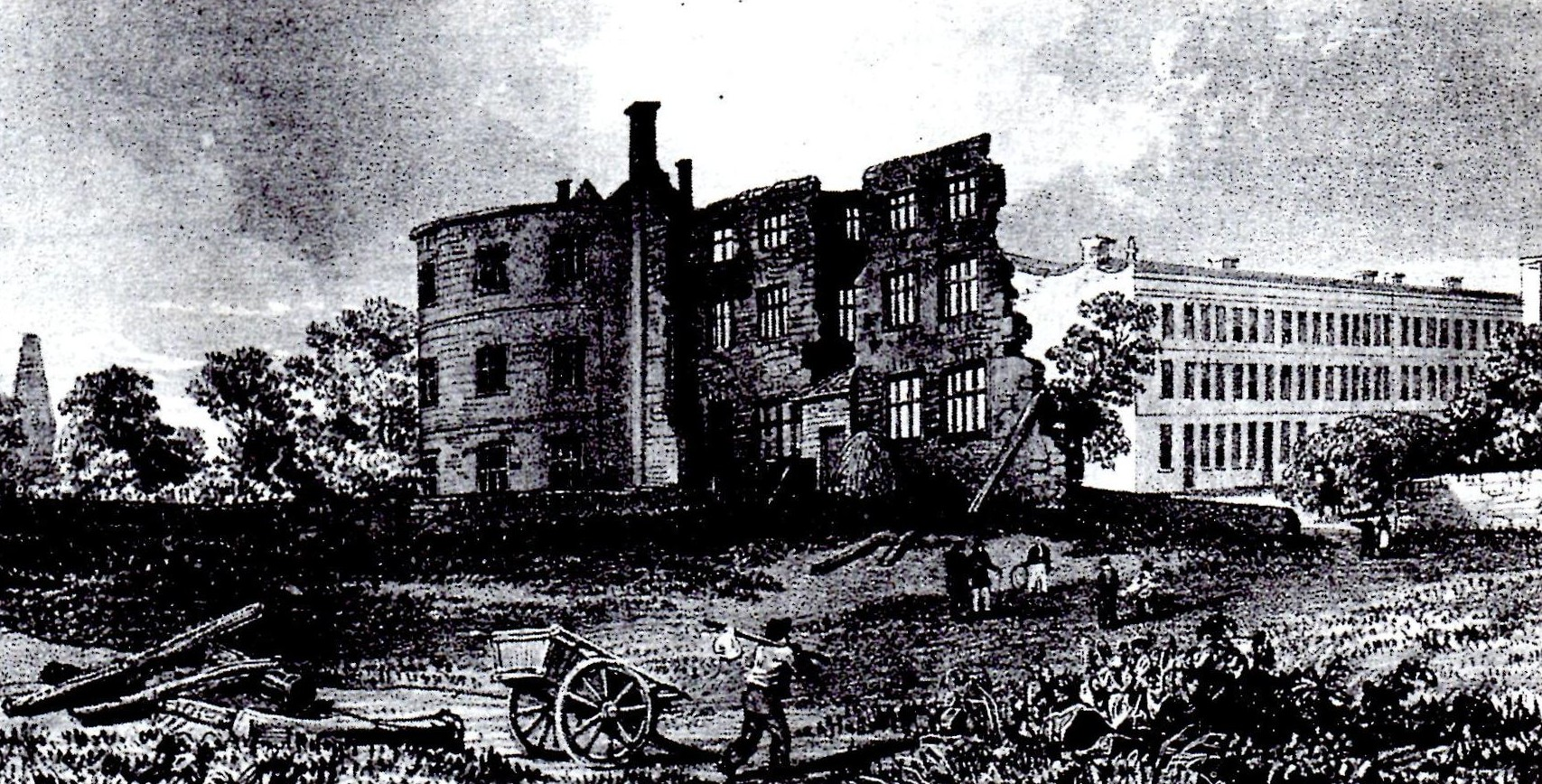
- Remains of the mansion on the site of the castle keep, with houses to the right on Castle Street. Lithograph after a painting in the mid 18th century by John Chubb

Site information
- Type: Castle

Location
- Shown within Somerset and the British Isles
- Coordinates: 51.1352°N 2.9990°W
- Grid reference: grid reference ST302378

Site history
- Built: 1202
- Built by: William Brewer
- In use: 1202-1645
- Materials: Old Red Sandstone
- Demolished: 1645

Bridgwater Castle was a castle in the town of Bridgwater, Somerset, England.

The stone castle was built around 1220 and contributed to the development of the town. It was surrounded by a moat and included a watergate giving access to the quay. In the 13th and 14th centuries the castle was involved in the Second Barons' War and Despenser War.

It then fell into ruin and parts were demolished in the first half of the 17th century and a new house built. Some of the walls survived and it played a minor role in the English Civil War and Monmouth Rebellion. In the later 17th and early 18th centuries many of the remaining buildings were demolished and new residential and industrial buildings constructed, giving its name to Castle Street. The watergate and some sections of wall survive.

== Early history ==
The castle was built early in the 13th century by William Brewer, like several other castle-builders of the period, an exceptionally wealthy man. He was granted the lordship of the Manor of Bridgwater by King John in 1201, and founded Bridgwater Friary. Before the building of the castle, Bridgwater was much smaller, but after the granting a licence to crenellate by King John, in 1200, charters for the creation of a borough and a market rapidly followed, effectively creating the heart of a new town. Initially Bridgwater faced competition from the established nearby port of Downend, protected by Down End Castle, but the new settlement rapidly became dominant.

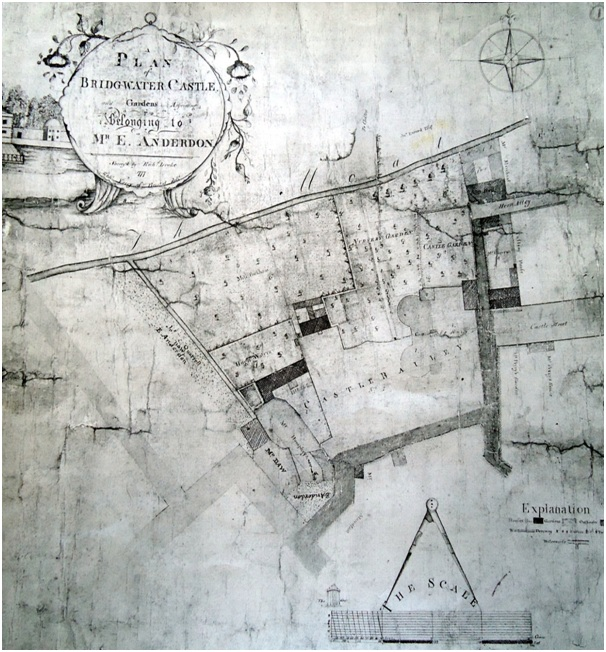
Map of the castle from 1777 by Richard Locke

Bridgwater Castle was a substantial structure built in Old Red Sandstone from Wembdon with other stone being transported from Downend in the Polden Hills and Ham Hill by boat. The site covered 8 or 9 acres (32,000 to 36,000 m^{2}). A tidal moat, up to 65 feet (20 m) wide in places, flowed about along the current streets of Fore Street and Castle Moat, and between Northgate and Chandos Street. The moat was filled from Durleigh brook, a tributary of the River Parrett. There is some evidence that there was a weir between the moat and the river. Unusually, the main entrance opposite the Cornhill was built with a pair of adjacent gates and drawbridges. In addition to a keep, located at the south-east corner of what is now King Square, documents show that the complex included a dungeon, chapel, stables and a bell tower. Built on the only raised ground in the town, the castle controlled the crossing of the town bridge. There is documentary evidence describing the castle as having "outer and inner bailies and that the buildings included the constable's house (on the high ground of King Square), a chapel (St Marks), hall (Mortemere's Hall) and chamber, stables, kitchens, horse mill and gatehouse as well as a bell tower and dovecote.

A 12 feet (4 m) thick portion of the castle wall and water gate, which are grade II* listed can still be seen on West Quay, and the remains of a wall of a building that was probably built within the castle can be viewed in Queen Street, and the garden of Lions House. The foundations of the tower forming the north-east corner of the castle are buried beneath Homecastle House.

William Brewer died in 1226 and his son, also called William, died in 1232; after his death, the castle passed to the king the following year, after which it was used as a store and prison. In 1242 repairs were ordered to its keep and some turrets and in 1246 to the towers. In 1248 ownership passed to Maud de Braose, Baroness Mortimer the wife of Roger Mortimer, 1st Baron Mortimer, and the castle was involved in the Second Barons' War.

In the Despenser War of 1321, Edward II undertook a campaign against the Mortimers, by then a potentially rebellious Marcher Lord family. After the short war, the crown again occupied Bridgwater until 1326 to prevent Roger Mortimer, 1st Earl of March using it as a base for operations if he should escape from custody or return from exile in France. Roger Mortimer did return from France with Edward's wife, Isabella; once they had seized the throne, the castle was returned to the Mortimer family but its upkeep was neglected and part of the moat was filled in. Only St Mark's Chapel and a barn were repaired, until the 1380s and 1390s when the towers, gatehouse and barbican were reinforced. By 1450 private houses had been built within the walls, Fore Street had been extended over the moat and its military value was reducing. It the 1540s John Leland described the castle as "all going to mere ruin" and part collapsed in 1548, with a house being built on the site.

== Civil war and the Monmouth Rebellion ==
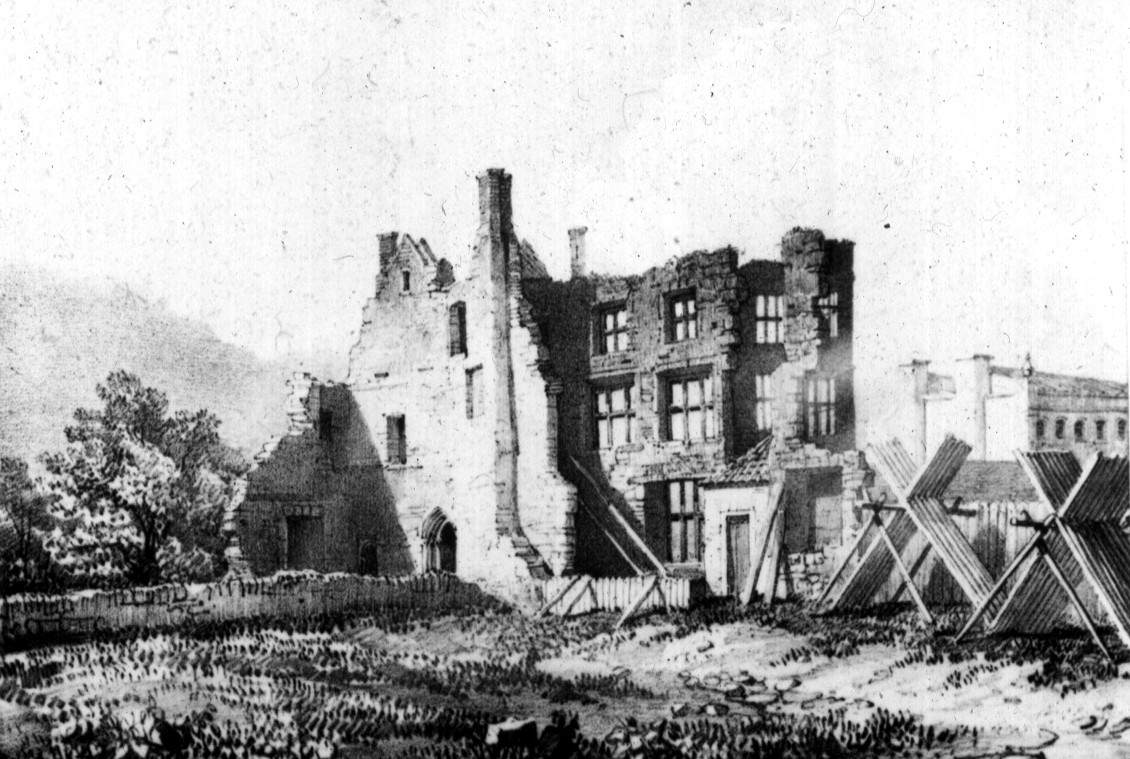
Remains of the mansion on the site of the castle keep — mid C18. A lithograph after a painting by John Chubb (1746–1818)

Some of the external walls of Bridgwater Castle were demolished in the early 1630s by the then owner Henry Harvey, an attorney of the Court of Common Pleas, to build his new house. Harvey had purchased it from George Whitmore who had been granted the ownership by Charles I in 1626. Harvey leased the house to Colonel Wyndham in 1643. The new house was in the shape of a Roman B and is shown on the map drawn by John Strachey in 1735 and another in 1777 by John Locke.

In 1642, however, the English Civil War broke out between supporters of Charles I and Parliament: the town and the castle were still seen as having value and a garrison was established by the Royalists under Edmund Wyndham. Wyndham's wife, Lady Crystabella Wyndham, fired a musket shot at Cromwell, from the castle wall, but missed and killed his aide-de-camp. Eventually, with many buildings having been destroyed in the town, the castle and its valuable contents were surrendered to the Parliamentarians on 21 July 1645. In 1651 Colonel Wyndham made arrangements for Charles II to flee to France following the Battle of Worcester.

The 18th-century historian John Collinson suggested that the castle itself was deliberately destroyed the following year, when parliament ordered that the garrison was disbanded. The extent of the order was debated and clarified again in 1647 and still debated in 1656. More recent studies argue, based on eyewitness descriptions, that much of the castle had already been destroyed and it was just some of the remaining walls and sconces which had been added for its defence which were destroyed.

Although Robert Blake was born in Bridgwater and became one of the most important military commanders of the Commonwealth of England and one of the most famous English admirals of the 17th century, he is not thought to have been involved in the fighting in the town, although he was involved in the sieges of Taunton.

During the Monmouth Rebellion of 1685 rebel troops were hemmed in at Bridgwater on 3 July, and were ordered to refortify the town, prior to the Battle of Sedgemoor.

== Rebuilding of the site ==
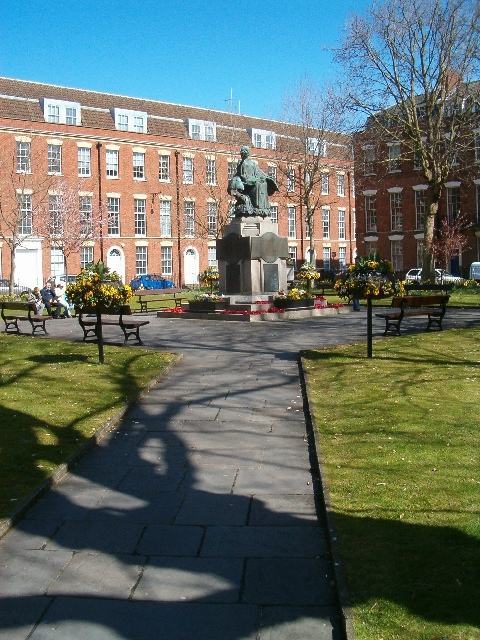
King's Square. The site of the castle today

During the later part of the 17th century John Harvey continued the development of the site. In 1721 the remains of the castle, the house and the land was sold to James Brydges, 1st Duke of Chandos who developed an industrial centre in the town and demolished the last of the buildings. Much of the site was built on in the 1720s to create the Georgian Castle Street. In 1734 Chandos sold the whole of the redevelopment area to Thomas Watts, who sold it the following year to John Anderton, whose descendants continued to clear old buildings and construct new ones. King's Square was built between 1807 and 1814, with many of the buildings incorporating stone from the old castle, although further study would be needed to say how much of their cellars and foundations are in situ castle walls.

The family of the Bridgwater artist, John Chubb (artist) purchased a Jacobean era Four-poster bed, from Bridgwater Castle, reputed to have been slept in by James Scott, 1st Duke of Monmouth at the time of the Battle of Sedgemoor It was sold in 1972 to Agecroft Hall.

In 2008, during sewer renovation work, a section of the curtain wall of the castle and a tunnel used to transport goods from the port were discovered.

Parts of the castle wall, water gate and undercroft still survive.

== See also ==
- Bridgwater War Memorial
- Castles in Great Britain and Ireland
- List of castles in England

== Bibliography ==
- Bush, Robin (1994). Somerset: The Complete Guide. Wimborne: Dovecote Press. ISBN 978-1874336266.
- Creighton, O. H. (2005). Castles and Landscapes. London: Equinox. ISBN 978-1904768678.
- Dunning, Robert (1995). Somerset Castles. Tiverton: Somerset Books. ISBN 978-0-86183-278-1.
- Dunning, Robert (1992). Bridgwater: History and Guide. Sutton Publishing. ISBN 978-0750901925.
- Farr, Grahame (1954). Somerset Harbours. London: Christopher Johnson. ASIN B0000CIU0I.
- Jordan, Don; Walsh, Michael (2015). The King's Bed: Sex, Power and the Court of Charles II. Hachette. ISBN 9781405528894.
- Kerr-Peterson, Miles (2013). "The End of Bridgwater Castle" (PDF). SANHS Proceedings. 156: 127–134.
- Lawrence, J.F.; Lawrence, J.C. (2008). A History of Bridgwater. Phillimore & Co. ISBN 978-1860773631.
- Leete-Hodge, Lornie (1985). Curiosities of Somerset. Bodmin: Bossiney Books. ISBN 978-0-906456-99-6.
- Pounds, Nigel (1993). The Medieval Castle in England and Wales. Cambridge: Cambridge University Press. ASIN B01K3IYTD2.
