= Winterstoke Hundred Academy =

Location
- Beaufighter Road; Weston-super-Mare, Somerset, BS24 8EE; England; 51°20′30″N 2°56′02″W

Information
- Type: Free school
- Established: 2014
- Local authority: North Somerset Council
- Department for Education URN: 147350 Tables
- Ofsted: Reports
- Principal: Matthew Randle
- Gender: Coeducational
- Age: 11 to 19
- Enrolment: 190
- Website: https://winterstokehundredacademy.clf.uk/

Winterstoke Hundred Academy (formerly North Somerset Enterprise and Technology College) is a coeducational secondary school and sixth form located in Weston-super-Mare, North Somerset, England.

It is a free school sponsored by the Cabot Learning Federation. The school is named after the historic Hundred of Winterstoke.

== History ==
North Somerset Enterprise and Technology College was established in 2014, specialising in the STEM subjects; Science, Technology, Engineering and Maths. The school originally had a pupil age range of 14 to 19.

The school opened to Year Twelve students in September 2014, taking in 190 learners, and opened for Year Ten students in September 2015.

The school structured its classes to start at 8.30am and end at 5pm in order to simulate a working day and promote a business and industry dress code for all students.

North Somerset Enterprise and Technology College was part of the Inspirational Futures Trust, which included the Herons’ Moor and Bristol Futures academies, and was partnered with Weston College, University of the West of England, The West of England Local Enterprise Partnership, NHS Bristol Trust and North Somerset Council.

The school building under construction c. November 2015

NSETC was initially based at Weston College’s South West Skills Campus. In November 2014, BAM Construction was awarded a £12,000,000 contract to build a dedicated NSETC campus on the outskirts of Weston-super-Mare.

The college's students were involved throughout the building's construction, with the first cohort of students invited to sign the building's steel frame. A topping out ceremony was held at the new site on 23 February 2016, led by Weston College principal Dr Paul Phillips OBE.

The new building, named was completed on the 15 August 2016.

In 2019 Inspirational Futures Trust was wound down, and North Somerset Enterprise and Technology College was taken over by the Cabot Learning Federation. The school was renamed Winterstoke Hundred Academy, and expanded its age range, admitting pupils from the age of 11 in September 2020.
