= King Square, Bridgwater =

Garden square in Bridgwater, Somerset, England

King Square
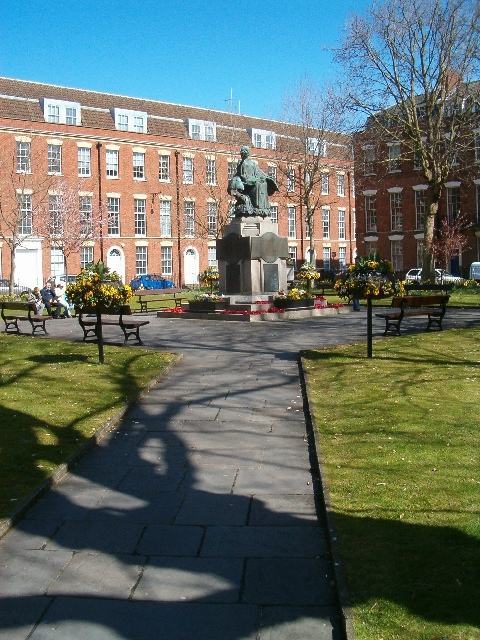
- The War Memorial and some of the houses in the square

- Location within Somerset
- 51.1296°N 3.0039°W
- Location: Bridgwater, Somerset, England

Listed Building – Grade II*

King Square in Bridgwater within the English county of Somerset was laid out with large Georgian houses between 1770 and 1800 on the site of Bridgwater Castle. It is also the site of the Bridgwater War Memorial

== History ==
The site of King Square was previously occupied by Bridgwater Castle. It was laid out with large Georgian houses between 1770 and 1800.

During the later part of the 17th century John Harvey developed the site of the castle. In 1721 the remains of the castle, the house and the land was sold to James Brydges, 1st Duke of Chandos who developed an industrial centre in the town and demolished the last of the buildings. Much of the site was built on in the 1720s to create the Georgian Castle Street. In 1734 Chandos sold the whole of the redevelopment area to Thomas Watts, who sold it the following year to John Anderton, whose descendants continued to clear old buildings and construct new ones. King Square was built between 1807 and 1814, with many of the buildings incorporating stone from the old castle, although further study would be needed to say how much of their cellars and foundations are in situ castle walls. In 2008, during sewer renovation work, a section of the curtain wall of the castle and a tunnel used to transport goods from the port were discovered.

== Architecture ==
Bridgwater War Memorial is a Grade II* listed war memorial located on King Square. It was designed by John Angel in the mid-1920s. The green figure of the memorial is allegorical, representing "Civilization as a seated female, holding a globe in one hand and with the book of knowledge on her lap."

Number one on the southern side is a house of Flemish bond brick with a Roman tile roof. Numbers One to Seven and eight and nine are part of a terrace with similar construction, listed separately. Numbers 10 to 14 are on the east side. Numbers 11 and 12 are on the west side of the square, as is the larger number 24, while 16 and 17 are on the north.
