= Hundred of Winterstoke =

Historical Hundred of Somerset, England

Winterstoke
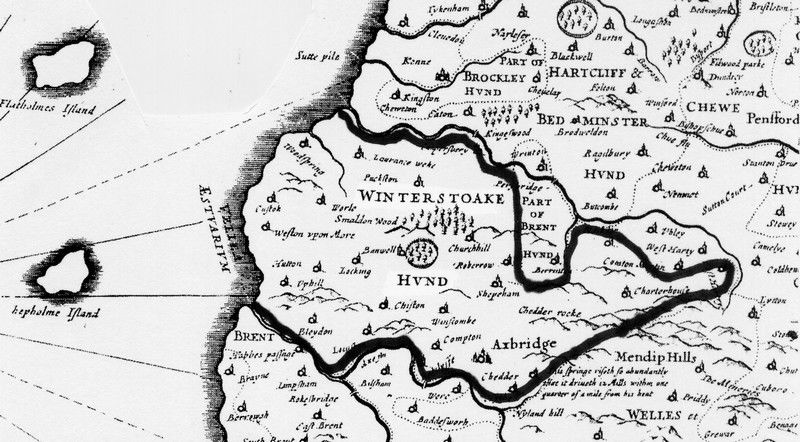
- Area
- 62,030 acres (251 km^{2})
- History
  - Created: unknown
- Status: Hundred
  - HQ: Banwell
- Subdivisions
  - Type: Parishes
  - Units: Axbridge, Badgworth, Banwell, Blagdon, Bleadon, Cheddar, Christon, Churchill, Compton Bishop, Congresbury, East Harptree, Hutton, Kenn, Kewstoke, Locking, Loxton, Puxton, Rodney Stoke, Rowberrow, Shipham, Uphill, Weston-super-Mare, Wick St Lawrence, Winscombe, Worle, Yatton

The Hundred of Winterstoke is one of the 40 historical Hundreds in the ceremonial county of Somerset, England, dating from before the Norman conquest during the Anglo-Saxon era although exact dates are unknown. By far the most important and authoritative source for the structure, history and development of Winterstoke Hundred is a seminal paper by Dr Frank Thorn. Each hundred had a 'fyrd', which acted as the local defence force and a court which was responsible for the maintenance of the frankpledge system. They also formed a unit for the collection of taxes. The role of the hundred court was described in the Dooms (laws) of King Edgar. The name of the hundred was normally that of its meeting-place.

It consisted of the ancient parishes of: Axbridge, Badgworth, Banwell, Blagdon, Bleadon, Cheddar, Christon, Churchill, Compton Bishop, Congresbury, East Harptree, Hutton, Kenn, Kewstoke, Locking, Loxton, Puxton, Rodney Stoke, Rowberrow, Shipham, Uphill, Weston-super-Mare, Wick St Lawrence, Winscombe, Worle, Yatton. It also included the extra parochial area of Charterhouse-on-Mendip, covering in total approximately 62,030 acres (25,100 ha).

The hundred court met at Banwell. An 18th-century antiquarian, Collinson, claimed that the name of the hundred came from a lost village called Winterstoke at a place in Banwell parish called Winthill. The name is proposed to be revived for a new housing development, Winterstoke Village, to be sited on the former Weston Airfield.

In the Domesday Book the hundred also included Kingston Seymour (later in Chewton Hundred).

The importance of the hundred courts declined from the seventeenth century. By the 19th century several different single-purpose subdivisions of counties, such as poor law unions, sanitary districts, and highway districts sprang up, filling the administrative role previously played by parishes and hundreds. Although the Hundreds have never been formally abolished, their functions ended with the establishment of county courts in 1867 and the introduction of districts by the Local Government Act 1894.

Lord Winterstoke (1830-1911) took his title from the hundred when he was raised to the peerage in 1906. His name is borne by Winterstoke Roads in south Bristol and Weston-super-Mare (probably named after the person rather directly after the hundred).

Winterstoke Hundred Academy is a secondary school in Weston-super-Mare which is named after the hundred.
