= Church of All Saints, Aisholt =

Church in Somerset, England

All Saints Church
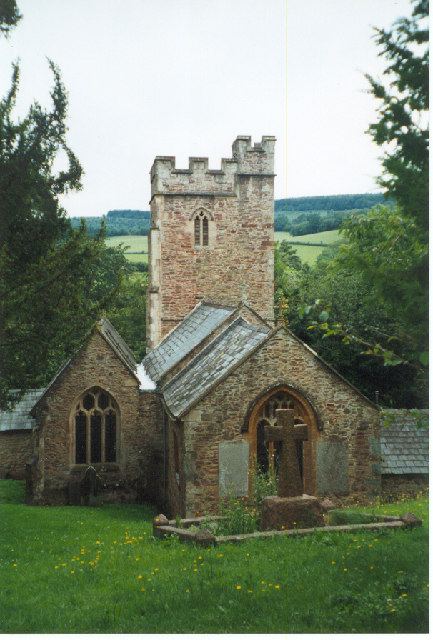

- Location within Somerset
- 51°6′47.22″N 3°09′4.97″W
- Location: Aisholt, Somerset, England

History
- Built: 14th century

Listed Building – Grade II*
- Official name: Church of All Saints
- Designated: 29 March 1963
- Reference no.: 1178112

All Saints Church in Aisholt, Somerset, England, is the Anglican parish church for the ancient parish of Aisholt, now part of the Quantock Villages Benefice in the Diocese of Bath and Wells, and lying in the Civil Parish of Spaxton. It is a Grade II* listed building.

== History ==
The earliest part of the existing building is the irregular and asymmetrical chancel arch which dates from the 14th century. The remainder of the building appears to be 15th century with later alterations and some slight 'restoration' in the 1890s.

== Architecture ==
The stone building has a slate roof. It consists of a nave, chancel with a vestry and a south aisle with a porch. The two-stage west tower is supported by diagonal buttresses.

Some features of the building are:

- A squint or piercing in the masonry to allow the altar to be viewed from the South aisle.
- A 17th century hatchment or Coat of Arms painted on the wall above the Door.
- A medieval parish chest cut from a single log.
- A piscina in the chancel
- A 15th century octagonal font

== Notable people ==
The diarist William Holland acted as curate in the church in the late 18th and early 19th century.

Notable people who have worshipped in Aisholt church include :

- The poet Henry Newbolt who owned The Old Schoolhouse at the bottom of the valley.
- A plaque in the church commemorates the educationalist Olive Willis.
- Poet and librettist Anne Ridler who was a pupil of Olive Willis at Downe House.
- Theologian, poet, novelist, occultist and Inkling Charles Williams.

== Trivia ==
The Church appeared in a Coleridge-themed pop video for Swing out Sister.

== See also ==
- List of ecclesiastical parishes in the Diocese of Bath and Wells
