= Rowberrow =

Village in Somerset, England

Coordinates: 51.3201°N 2.7886°W

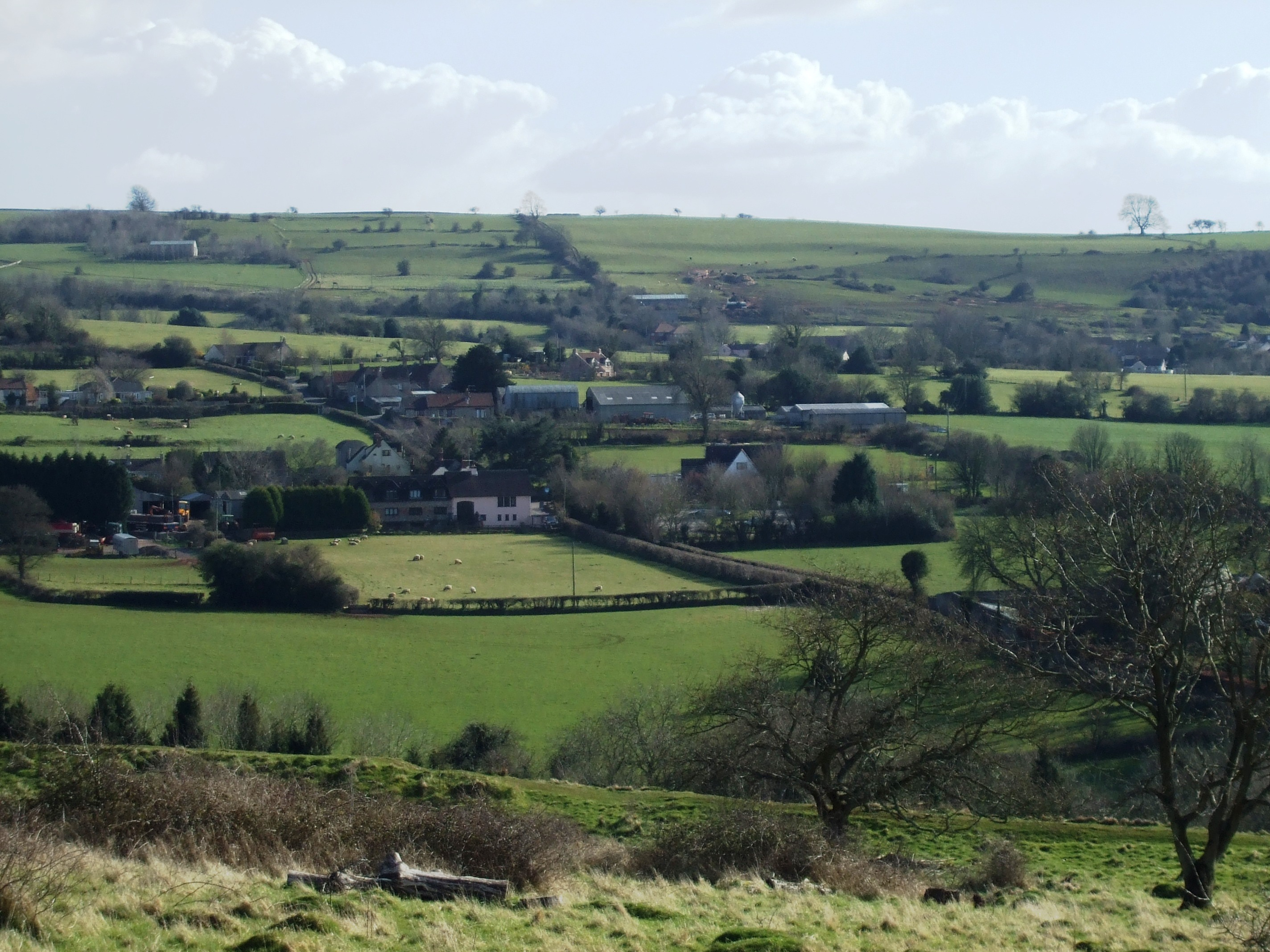

- Location within Somerset
- OS grid reference: ST450582
- Civil parish: Shipham
- Unitary authority: Somerset Council
- Ceremonial county: Somerset
- Region: South West
- Country: England
- Sovereign state: United Kingdom
- Post town: Winscombe
- Postcode district: BS25
- Dialling code: 01934
- Police: Avon and Somerset
- Fire: Devon and Somerset
- Ambulance: South Western
- UK Parliament: Wells and Mendip Hills

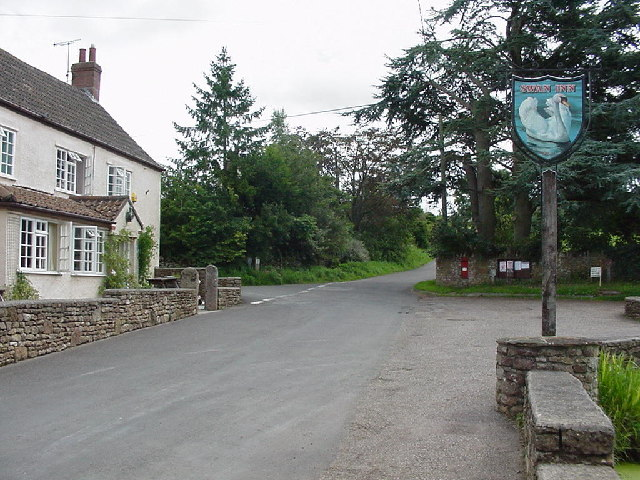
The Swan at Rowberrow

Rowberrow is a small village and former civil parish, now in the parish of Shipham in the Somerset district, in the ceremonial county of Somerset, England. In 1931 the parish had a population of 56. On 1 April 1933 the parish was abolished and merged with Shipham.

Rowberrow is near Churchill, close to the Dolebury Warren Iron Age hill fort.

It is the site of a Bronze Age barrow approximately 20 metres (66 ft) in diameter, which was excavated in 1813, and is believed to have given the village its name as Rowbarrow means 'rough hill' or 'barrow'.

The parish was part of the Winterstoke Hundred.

It was formerly a mining parish producing calamine.

== Church ==
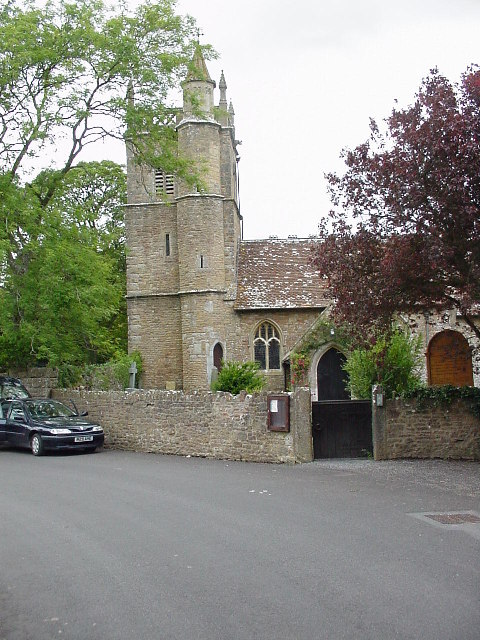
Rowberrow Church

The parish Church of St Michael and All Angels dates from the late 14th century, however the nave, chancel and south porch were rebuilt in 1865. It is a Grade II* listed building.

== Notable residents ==
The author Terry Pratchett lived in Rowberrow from 1970 to 1993. His daughter Rhianna was born in the village.

The author and cat lover Doreen Tovey lived in Rowberrow from the early fifties until her death in 2008.
