= Robin Hood's Hut =

Building in Goathurst, Somerset, England

Robin Hoods Hut
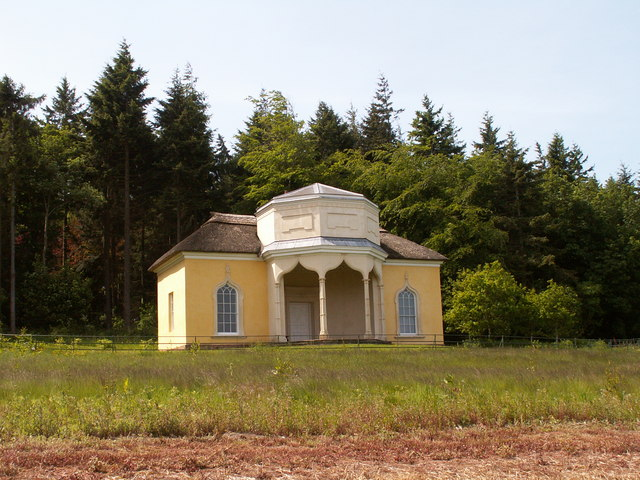

- Location within Somerset

General information
- Location: Goathurst, England
- Coordinates: 51.094399°N 3.066022°W
- Completed: 1740
- Client: Sir Charles Kemeys-Tynte

Robin Hood's Hut is a small pavilion in the grounds of Halswell House, Goathurst, Somerset, in the west of England.

It was built between 1740 and 1760 by Sir Charles Kemeys-Tynte. It had three rooms: an earth-floored hermit's room, a kitchen and a "china room" used for dining. It is fronted by an umbrello which is open to the elements.

When the Somerset Buildings Preservation Trust started restoration work in 1997, with grants from English Heritage and the Heritage Lottery, the structure had neither roof nor windows, had lost much of its plasterwork and its umbrello was almost gone.

Robin Hood's Hut was commended in the Building Conservation category of Royal Institution of Chartered Surveyors awards 2005, and is a Grade II* listed building.

The building was acquired by the Landmark Trust in 2002 and is available as a holiday let.
