= St Bridget's Church, Brean =

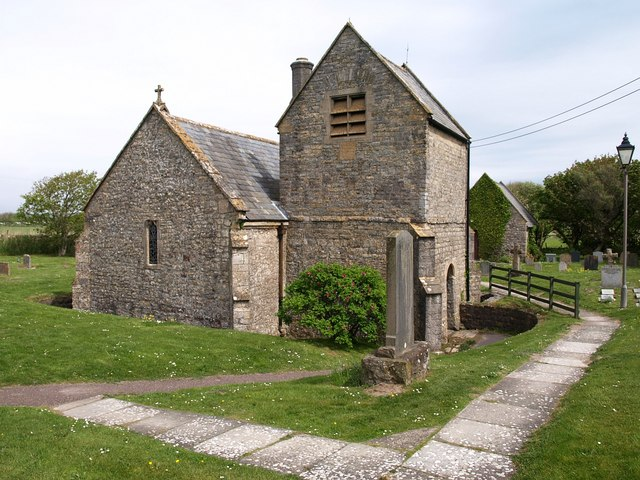

- Location within Somerset
- 51.2983°N 3.0099°W
- Location: Brean
- Country: England
- Denomination: Church of England
- Website: www.berrowandbrean.co.uk

History
- Dedication: Brigid of Kildare

Architecture
- Heritage designation: Grade II* listed
- Designated: 9 February 1961

Administration
- Province: Canterbury
- Diocese: Bath and Wells
- Archdeaconry: Wells

St Bridget's Church, Brean is the Church of England parish church of the village of Brean in Somerset, England.

The parish is part of a benefice with the Parish Church of St Mary, Berrow. The benefice is part of the Archdeaconry of Wells in the Diocese of Bath and Wells. Since the 1980s, St Bridget's parish has been in a local ecumenical partnership (LEP) with Brean Methodist Church.

== History ==
The dedication to Brigid of Kildare, an Irish abbess who died in 525, implies that Brean was a Celtic Christian settlement.

The present church building has 13th-century origins but was largely rebuilt in the 15th century and again in 1882. The tower was damaged by lightning in the 18th century and rebuilt in 1729. The interior includes a 17th-century pulpit and a 14th or 15th century octagonal stone font. The church is a Grade II* listed building.

== Bells ==
The tower has a ring of five bells. The third, fourth, and tenor bells were cast at Bristol in about 1499. The Whitechapel Bell Foundry cast the second bell in 1880 and the treble bell in 2000. The bells are rung occasionally for services and weddings by a band of bell ringers from both churches.

== Access ==
The church is open daily throughout the summer months. Next to the church is a church room with toilets and a kitchen.

== See also ==
- List of ecclesiastical parishes in the Diocese of Bath and Wells

== Sources and further reading ==
- Dunning, Robert (1992) [1980]. Somerset and Avon. Stroud: Alan Sutton Publishing. pp. 58–59. ISBN 0-7028-8380-8.
- Pevsner, Nikolaus (1958). South and West Somerset. The Buildings of England. Harmondsworth: Penguin Books. p. 92.
