= Enmore, Somerset =

Village in Somerset, England

Coordinates: 51.111°N 3.087°W

Enmore
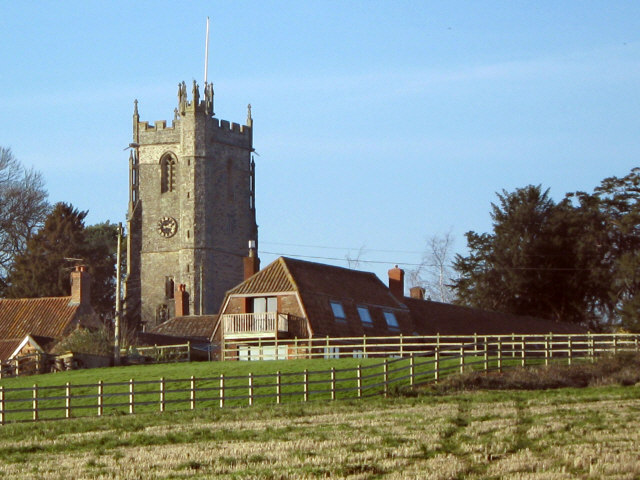
- Church of St Michael, Enmore

- Location within Somerset
- Population: 247 (2011)
- OS grid reference: ST240351
- Unitary authority: Somerset Council
- Ceremonial county: Somerset
- Region: South West
- Country: England
- Sovereign state: United Kingdom
- Post town: BRIDGWATER
- Postcode district: TA5
- Dialling code: 01278
- Police: Avon and Somerset
- Fire: Devon and Somerset
- Ambulance: South Western
- UK Parliament: Bridgwater

Enmore is a village and civil parish 2 miles (3 km) west of Bridgwater on the Quantock Hills in Somerset, England. The parish includes the hamlet of Bare Ash.

== History ==
The parish name means Duck marsh.

In 1086, the Domesday Book recorded that Enmore contained 8 families. From around 1100 the manor was held by the Malet family, with Sir Baldwin Malet obtaining a grant of a Monday market and three-day fair in 1401.

Enmore was part of the hundred of Andersfield.

Barford House sits in a landscaped park. It was built around 1710 for the Jeanes family.

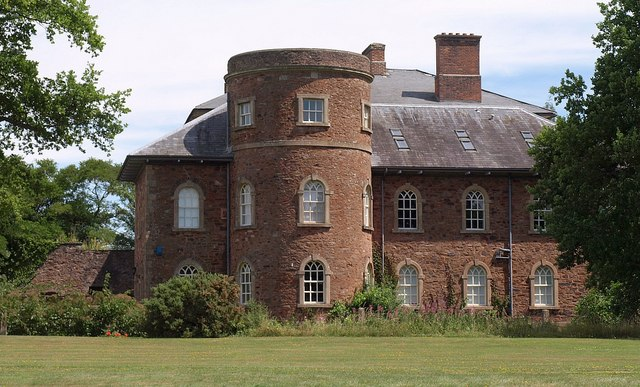
Enmore Castle

Enmore Castle, built between 1751 and 1756 for John Perceval, 2nd Earl of Egmont, received 'the dismissive mockery of Horace Walpole'. Much of the building, including the offices and stables, were underground and accessed via the dry moat. The Percevals were forced to sell the castle in 1833 to pay off debts. It was bought by Nicholas Broadmead who subsequently demolished a large proportion of the building the following year. The castle once again underwent major change in 1930 when H. H. Broadmead demolished even more of the old building. The remaining portion is now divided into two dwellings.

== Governance ==
The parish council has responsibility for local issues, including setting an annual precept (local rate) to cover the council's operating costs and producing annual accounts for public scrutiny. The parish council evaluates local planning applications and works with the local police, district council officers, and neighbourhood watch groups on matters of crime, security, and traffic. The parish council's role also includes initiating projects for the maintenance and repair of parish facilities, as well as consulting with the district council on the maintenance, repair, and improvement of highways, drainage, footpaths, public transport, and street cleaning. Conservation matters (including trees and listed buildings) and environmental issues are also the responsibility of the council.

For local government purposes, since 1 April 2023, the village comes under the unitary authority of Somerset Council. Prior to this, it was part of the non-metropolitan district of Sedgemoor, which was formed on 1 April 1974 under the Local Government Act 1972, having previously been part of Bridgwater Rural District.

It is also part of the Bridgwater county constituency represented in the House of Commons of the Parliament of the United Kingdom. It elects one Member of Parliament (MP) by the first past the post system of election, and was part of the South West England constituency of the European Parliament prior to Britain leaving the European Union in January 2020, which elected seven MEPs using the d'Hondt method of party-list proportional representation.

== Education ==
Enmore County Primary School is believed to have opened in 1810 probably in a cottage very close to the church. It was the first Free National School in England. The present fabric dates from 1848 and was built by a local family, the Loxtons.

== Leisure and Recreation ==
Locating in the village in 1932, Enmore Park Golf Club is one of the largest attractions in the village, and is located towards the centre of the village

== Religious sites ==
The Church of St Michael has 13th-century origins but the present building is largely from the 15th century. It has been designated by English Heritage as a Grade II* listed building.
