= Market Cross, Cheddar =

Cheddar Market Cross
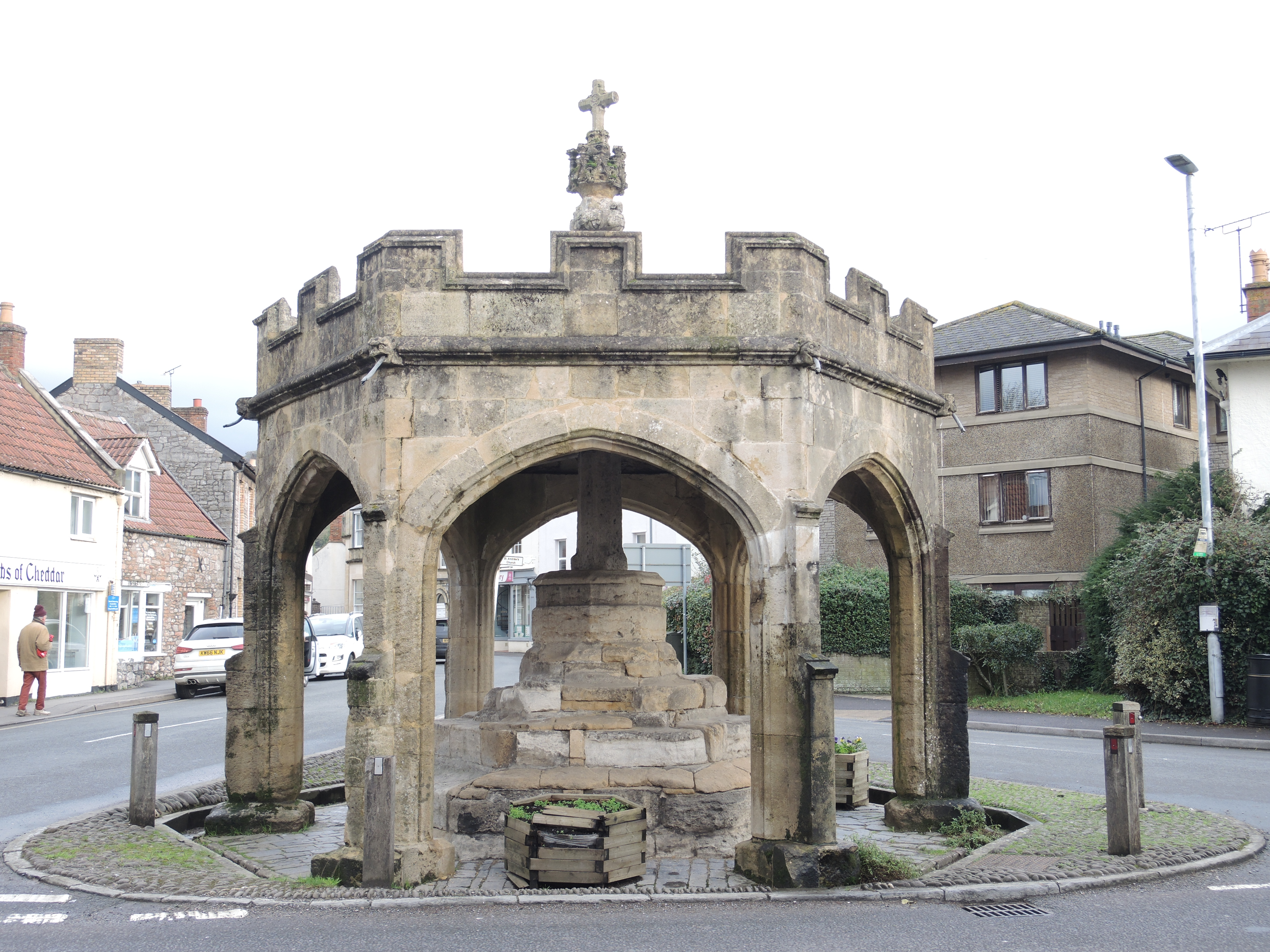
- The Market Cross in 2023

- Location within Somerset
- 51°16′32″N 2°46′36″W
- Location: Cheddar, Somerset, England

History
- Built: 15th century

Listed Building – Grade II*
- Official name: Market Cross
- Designated: 9 February 1961
- Reference no.: 1173642

Scheduled monument
- Official name: Market Cross
- Designated: 12 February 1925
- Reference no.: 1019033

Cheddar Market Cross in the village of Cheddar within the English county of Somerset, England dates from the 15th century. It is a Scheduled Ancient Monument, and Grade II* listed building.

The stone cross, used to mark the village's market square, has a central octagonal pier surrounded by a hexagonal shelter. It has been restored and rebuilt several times, including twice since 2000 when it has been damaged in traffic accidents.

== History ==
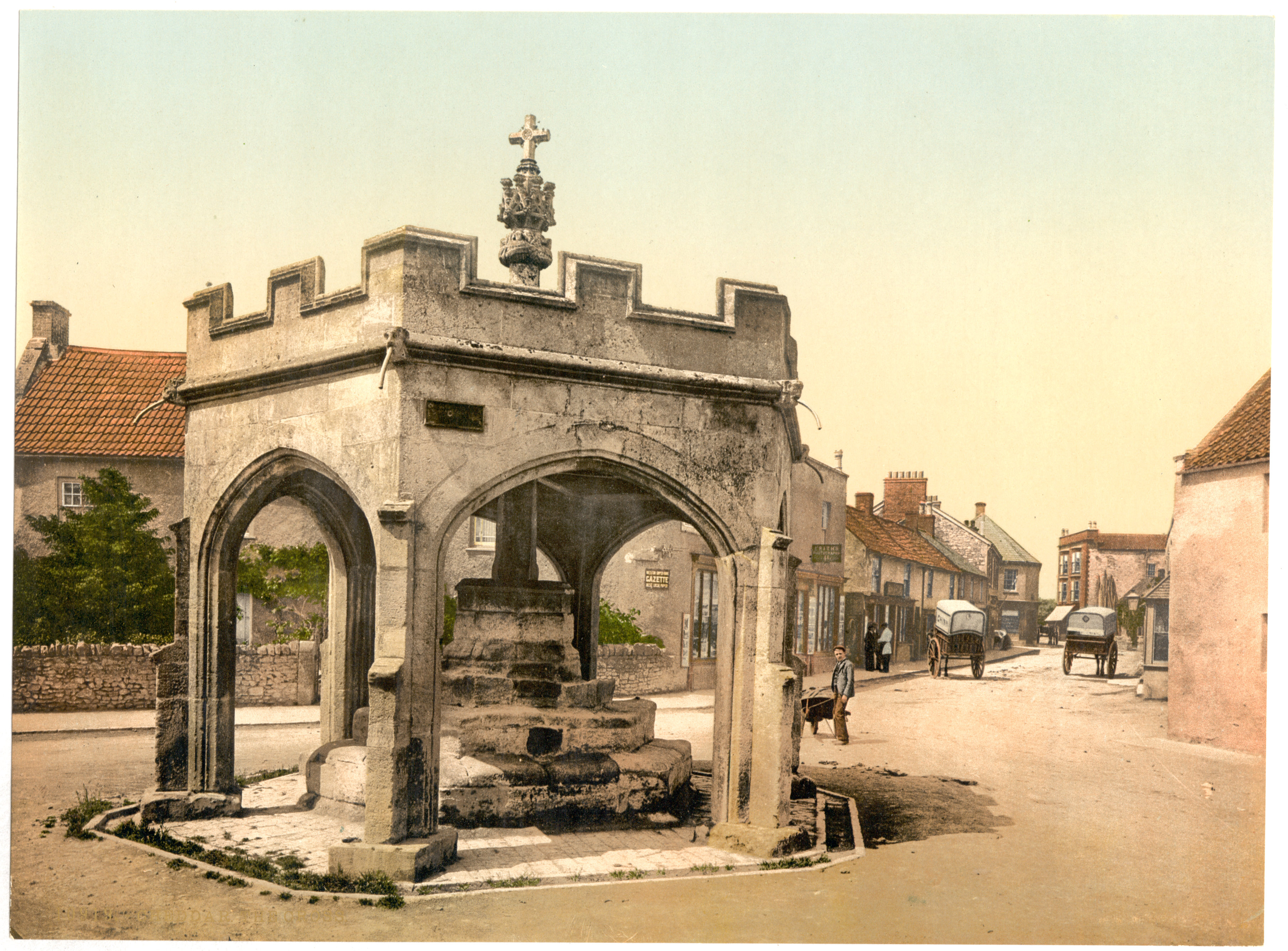
Photochrom of Cheddar Market Cross in the 1890s

The market cross in Bath Street dates from the 15th century. In the 16th or 17th century it was enclosed with a hexagonal arch structure. It was rebuilt by Thomas, Marquis of Bath in the 18th century. The shelter was rebuilt and the rafters replaced in 1834. This was around the time of the market cross in nearby Axbridge being demolished and some of the material from that cross may have been used in Cheddar. The cross head was added at some time after 1877.

In January 2000, the cross was seriously damaged in a traffic accident. By 2002, the cross had been rebuilt and the area around it was redesigned to protect and enhance its appearance. The cross was badly damaged again in March 2012, when a taxi crashed into it late at night demolishing two sides. Repair work using as much of the original stone as possible, which included the addition of wooden-clad steel posts to protect against future crashes, was completed in November 2012 at a cost of £60,000.

== Architecture ==
It has a central octagonal pier, a socket raised on three steps, a hexagonal shelter with six arched four-centred openings, shallow two-stage buttresses at each angle, and an embattled parapet. The shaft is crowned by an abacus with figures in niches, probably from the late 19th century, although the cross is now missing.
