= Bridgwater War Memorial =

War memorial in Somerset, England

- England
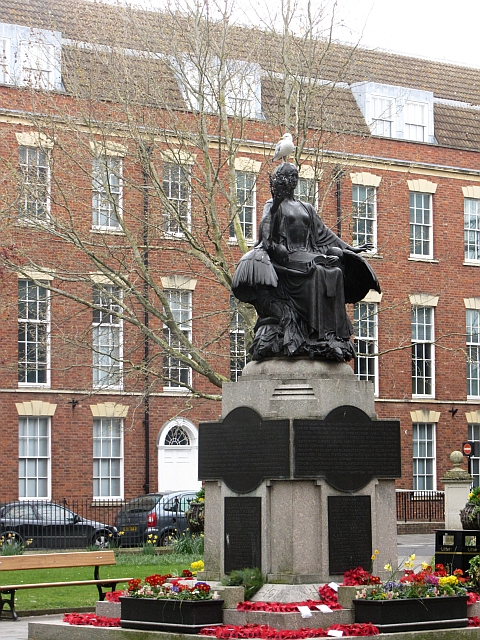
- The Angel of Bridgwater which serves as Bridgwater War Memorial in King Square with the offices of Sedgemoor District Council in the background
- For World War I, World War II, Korean War, Falklands Conflict and Afghan conflict
- Established: 1924
- Unveiled: 1924
- Location: 51.1296°N 3.0039°W near Bridgwater, Somerset
- Designed by: John Angel
- Commemorated: World War I – 364; World War II −113; Korean War – 1; Falklands Conflict – 1; Afghan conflict −1

Bridgwater War Memorial is a Grade II* listed war memorial located on King Square in Bridgwater, Somerset, England, on the site previously occupied by Bridgwater Castle. It was designed by John Angel in the mid-1920s. The green figure of the memorial is allegorical, representing "Civilization as a seated female, holding a globe in one hand and with the book of knowledge on her lap."

== Description ==
John Angel sculpted the Angel of Bridgwater. Mounted on a plinth, a female figure of 'Civilisation' lofts the world, which is encircled by emblems of commerce and peace. Under her foot are the "demons of war." The throne and figure are backed by "relief depictions of Labour, Home, Life and Education." On her lap is a book of laws, and she is surrounded by children. Indeed, given its monumental breadth, the many details in the design, and its metaphorical and iconic form, the sculpture is subject to colorful and variant interpretations and description. The bronze was cast by W Morris Art Bronze Foundry.

At the time, Angel was working four years as assistant to Sir George Frampton, and Frampton's influence is apparent. Figures from the roughly contemporaneous Exeter War Memorial, specifically "Peace" (also known as Victory) were exhibited by Angel at The Royal Academy in 1922, being exhibited in the courtyard of Burlington House, as were other studies of the Bridgwater War Memorial on several occasions.

On the third step these words are inscribed: "IN HONOUR OF THE MEN OF BRIDGWATER WHO GAVE THEIR LIVES IN THE GREAT WAR 1914–1918"

The memorial was unveiled by General the Earl of Cavan (then Chief of the Imperial General Staff) on 25 September 1924, to commemorate the fallen of World War I. Further names have been added following World War II, the Korean War. Falklands Conflict and the Afghan conflict. (Note: Killed in Afghanistan in 2006, Sergeant Benjamin James Knight was added. See War Memorials Trust, infra. He was one of 14 British servicemen lost in the 2 September 2006 crash of the Royal Air Force Nimrod XV230 aircraft. "Nimrod Losses – XV230". Globalsecurity.org. "News Article: Fourteen personnel in Afghanistan Nimrod crash named". Ministry of Defence. 3 September 2006. Archived from the original on 9 October 2012. See also, British Forces casualties in Afghanistan since 2001.) It has been characterised as, "An exceptionally fine and moving memorial, which forms an important focal point to this fine late Georgian square."

In 2009 the memorial benefited from a small stipend from War Memorials Trust, which was used to replace bronze plaques and add a new one. The new plaques are said to be a precise match in form and typeface for those that were replaced.

== See also ==
- World War I memorials
- Grade II* listed war memorials in England
