= Church of St John the Baptist, Biddisham =

Church in Somerset, England

Church of St John The Baptist
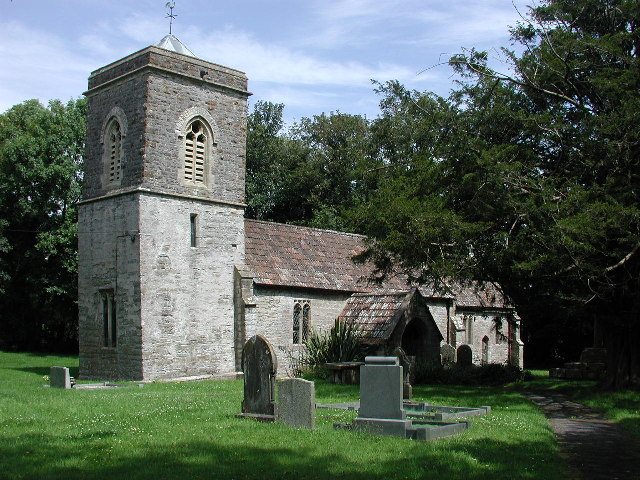

- Location within Somerset
- 51.2767°N 2.8875°W
- Location: Biddisham, Somerset, England

Site notes
- Area: 13th century

Listed Building – Grade II*
- Official name: Church of St John The Baptist
- Designated: 9 February 1961
- Reference no.: 1059138

Listed Building – Grade II*
- Official name: Churchyard Cross, in the churchyard, 5 metres south of south porch, Church of St John th Baptist
- Designated: 9 February 1961
- Reference no.: 1173427

The Anglican Church of St John The Baptist in Biddisham within the parish of Badgeworth, Somerset, England was built in the 13th century. It is a Grade II* listed building.

== History ==
Following its original construction in the 13th century, on the site of an earlier two-cell church, parts of the church were rebuilt in the `15th. It underwent extensive Victorian restoration around 1860.

The Crook Peak parish and benefice are within the Diocese of Bath and Wells.

== Architecture ==
The stone church has a two-bay chancel and nave. The two-stage tower has a parapet.

The interior has a 12th century rectangular font. It has a scalloped bowl lined with lead.

The churchyard cross which dates from the late 14th century is also Grade II* listed. The original two-step base and part of the polygonal shaft are still present, however the head of the cross is missing.
