= Church of St Michael and All Angels, Bawdrip =

Church in Somerset, England

Church of St Michael and All Angels
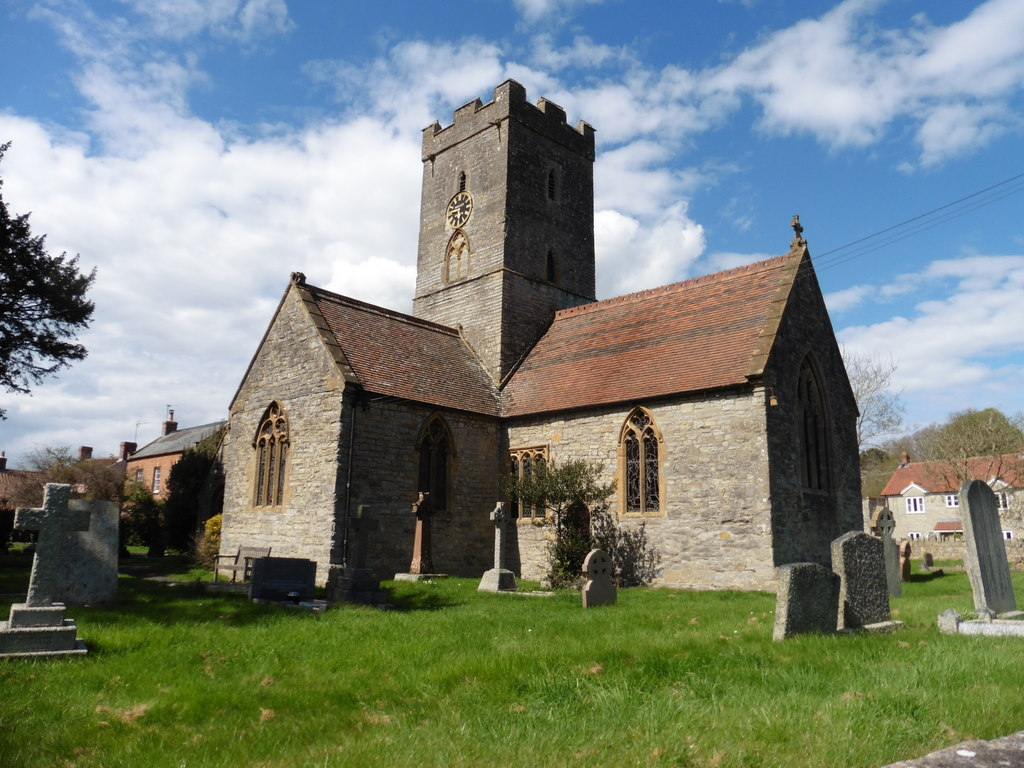

- Location within Somerset
- 51.1517°N 2.9429°W
- Location: Bawdrip, Somerset, England

History
- Built: 13th or 14th century

Listed Building – Grade II*
- Official name: Church of St Michael and All Angels
- Designated: 29 March 1963
- Reference no.: 1060158

The Anglican Church of St Michael and All Angels in Bawdrip, Somerset, England was built in the late 13th or early 14th century. It is a Grade II* listed building.

== History ==
The church was built in the late 13th to early 14th century, on the site of an early church which had belonged to Athelney Abbey.

It underwent Victorian restoration in 1866.

The parish is part of the benefice of Woolavington with Cossington and Bawdrip which is part of the Diocese of Bath and Wells.

== Architecture ==
The Blue Lias church consists of a two-bay nave, two-bay chancel, and north and south transepts. The crossing tower has gargoyles and a parapet. Within the tower are four bells. Two of these are believed to be from 1448 and the others from 1671 and 1745.

In the church is a 14th century effigy depicting Sir Simon de Bradney in his armour.

== See also ==
- List of ecclesiastical parishes in the Diocese of Bath and Wells
