= Church of All Saints, Ashcott =

Church in Somerset, England

Church of All Saints
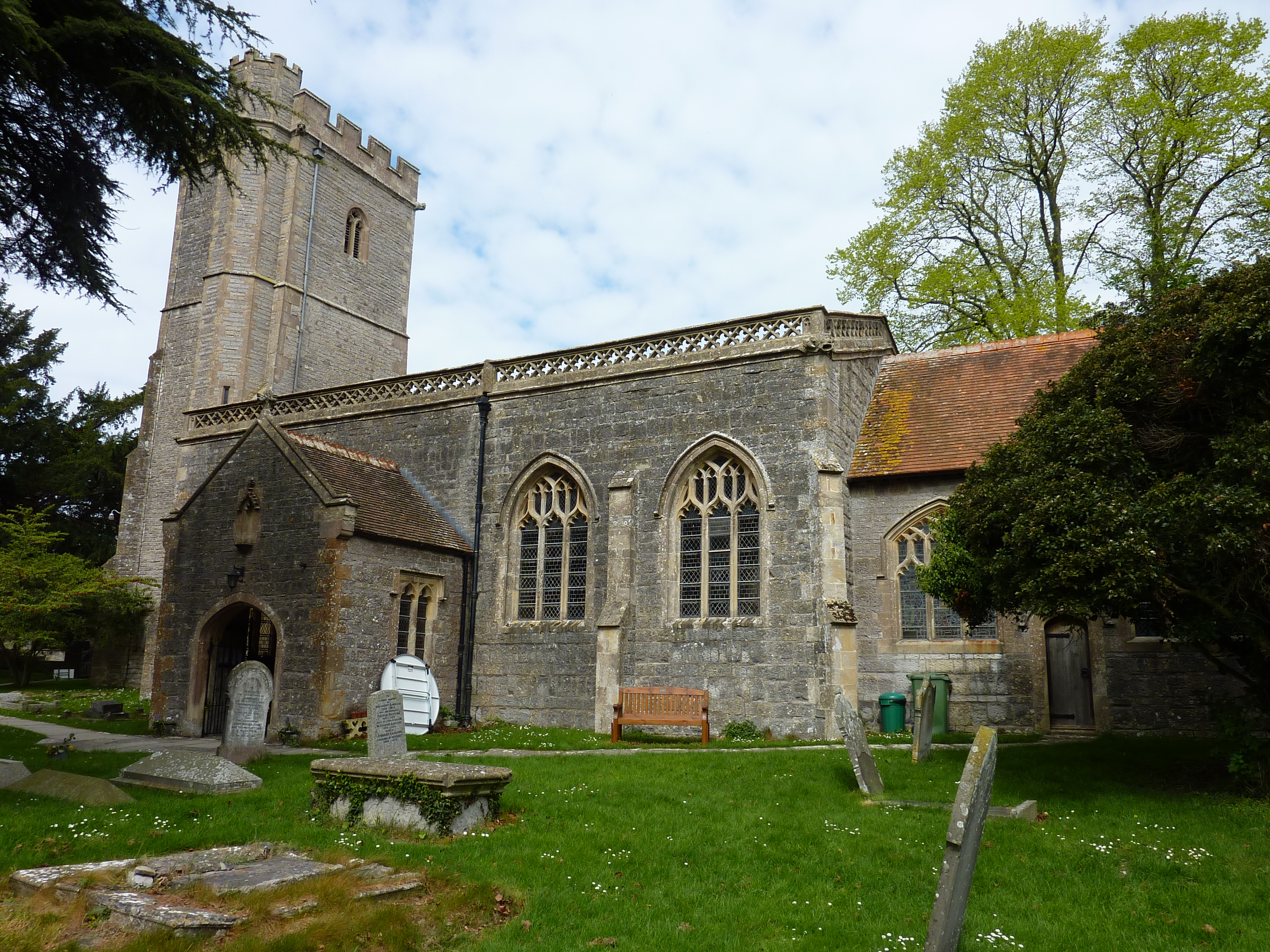

- Location within Somerset
- 51.1308°N 2.8057°W
- Location: Ashcott, Somerset, England

History
- Built: 15th century

Listed Building – Grade II*
- Official name: Church of All Saints
- Designated: 29 March 1963
- Reference no.: 1058957

The Anglican Church of All Saints in Ashcott, Somerset, England was built in the 15th century. It is a Grade II* listed building.

== History ==
The church was built in the 15th century on the site of an earlier church. The building was probably carried out between 1456 and 1492 and bears the arms of John Selwood the Abbot of Glastonbury Abbey at the time.

In 1831 the nave was widened as part of a Victorian restoration. It has since deteriorated with the floor being damaged by water. The vestry roof needs replacing and the tower and parapets need masonry repairs. Therefore the building has been placed on the Heritage at Risk Register.

The Polden Wheel parish and benefice is within the Diocese of Bath and Wells.

== Architecture ==
The church consists of a three-bay nave with a south porch. The two-bay chancel includes an organ loft. The two-stage west tower is supported by diagonal buttresses.

The south window has stained glass by Charles Eamer Kempe.

The Norman font has a circular bowl on a cylindrical stem.
