= Church of St Martin, Fiddington =

Church in Somerset, England

Church of St Martin
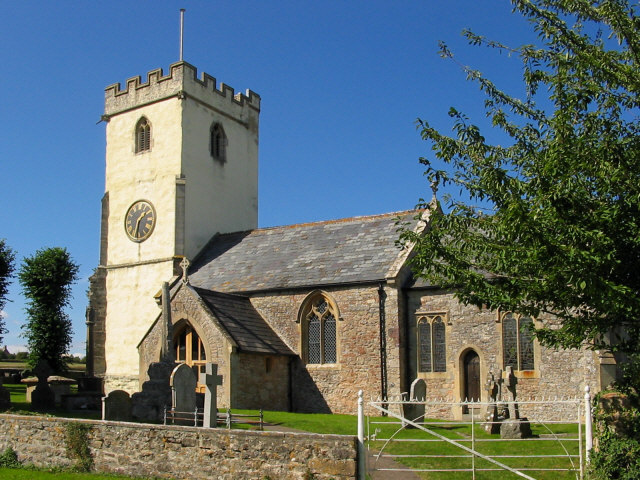

- Location within Somerset
- 51.1592°N 3.1229°W
- Location: Fiddington, Somerset, England

History
- Built: 11th century

Listed Building – Grade II*
- Official name: Church of St Martin
- Designated: 29 March 1963
- Reference no.: 1264213

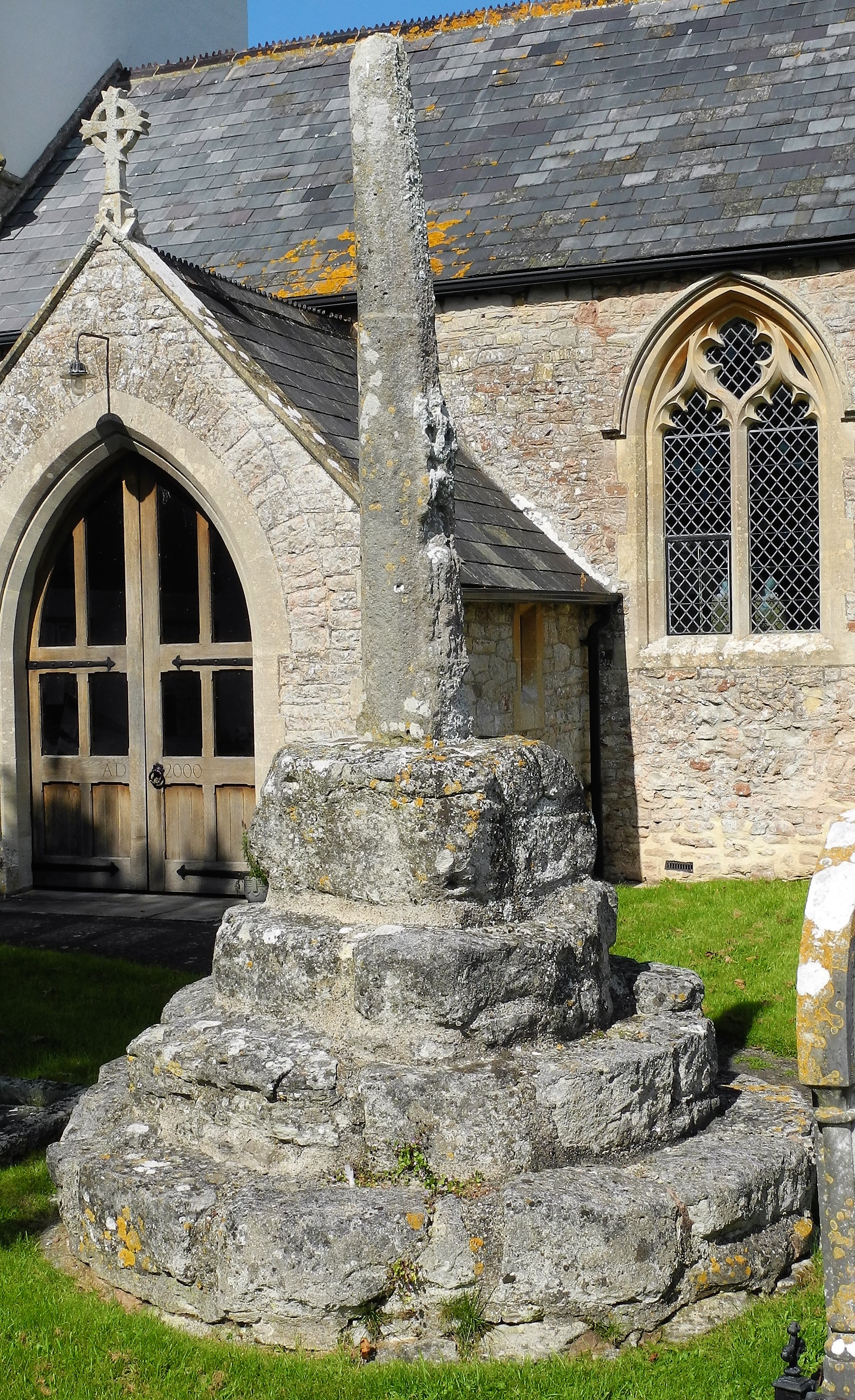
The cross in the churchyard.

The Anglican Church of St Martin in Fiddington within the English county of Somerset dates from the 11th century and has been designated by English Heritage as a Grade II* listed building.

== History ==
Part of the herringbone masonry survives from the 11th century, however the church has been revised several times since. The roof is from the 16th century. A storm in 1729 damaged the building and restoration work was undertaken.

The church was restored by John Norton in 1860, which included the addition of the north aisle. The peal of six bells was dedicated by Leonard Olyott, Archdeacon of Taunton on September 7, 1979 with financial help from the Meaker Trust, the Meakers were a local family who owned Meakers Department Stores.

The parish is part of the Quantock Coast benefice within the Diocese of Bath and Wells.

== Architecture ==
The building consists of a nave, aisle and chancel with vestry. The three-stage west tower is supported by diagonal buttresses.

=== Sheela na Gig ===
On the outer south wall of the nave is a 12 inches (30 cm) Sheela na Gig. It is unusual in having one arm aloft and the other resting on a knee. The part of the figure showing genitalia is less well defined than the upper body, possibly as a result of weathering or an attempt to obscure that part of the image at some time in the past. The Sheela na Gig at Fiddington was examined and brass rubbed by Mick Aston in the late 1970s, Aston who later found fame through the television programme Time Team was at that time county archaeologist for Somerset. He noted that the figure is only one of three currently known in Somerset (the other two are at Wells Cathedral). Aston hinted at a date in the 11th or 12th century for the figure, noting that the stone on which the figure is carved is reddish-purple sandstone and forms a quoin in the south wall which is contemporary with the surrounding herringbone masonry.

The interior includes a 15th-century piscina. The pulpit and font are Jacobean.

=== Churchyard ===
The churchyard contains two Grade II listed structures. Five metres south-east of the porch stands an eight feet (2.4 metres) high cross. The cross head is now missing, but it is described as visually impressive and probably in its original position. The sandstone cross is thought to date from the early 14th century and the shaft has a carved weathered human face on its eastern face. Closer to the porch is the tomb of Matthew Grove which dates from 1680. The sandstone chest tomb is made up four massive stone slabs.

== See also ==
- List of ecclesiastical parishes in the Diocese of Bath and Wells
