= Shipham =

Village in Somerset, England

Coordinates: 51.314°N 2.796°W

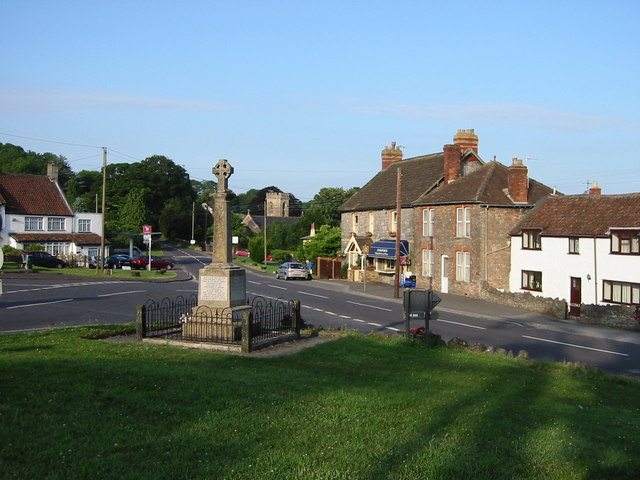
- The Square in Shipham with the War Memorial in the foreground

- Location within Somerset
- Population: 1,087
- OS grid reference: ST445575
- Unitary authority: Somerset Council
- Ceremonial county: Somerset
- Region: South West
- Country: England
- Sovereign state: United Kingdom
- Post town: WINSCOMBE
- Postcode district: BS25
- Dialling code: 01934
- Police: Avon and Somerset
- Fire: Devon and Somerset
- Ambulance: South Western
- UK Parliament: Wells and Mendip Hills

Shipham (grid reference ST445575) is a village and civil parish in Somerset, England. It is on the western edge of the Mendip Hills near the A38, approximately 15 miles (24 km) south of Bristol. The parish includes the village of Rowberrow and the hamlet of Star. The parish population, according to the 2011 census, is 1,087.

== History ==
Shipham was listed in the Domesday Book of 1086 as Sipeham, meaning 'The sheep home' from the Old English scip and ham. The tenant-in-chief is shown as being Roger de Courcelles.

The parish was part of the Winterstoke Hundred.

== Governance ==
Shipham parish council, which was established in 1894, has responsibility for local issues, including setting an annual precept (local rate) to cover the council's operating costs and producing annual accounts for public scrutiny. The parish council evaluates local planning applications and works with the local police, district council officers, and neighbourhood watch groups on matters of crime, security, and traffic. The parish council's role also includes initiating projects for the maintenance and repair of parish facilities, as well as consulting with the district council on the maintenance, repair, and improvement of highways, drainage, footpaths, public transport, and street cleaning. Conservation matters (including trees and listed buildings) and environmental issues are also the responsibility of the council. In 2008, Shipham Parish Council won the communications category of the Calor Somerset Village of the Year competition.

For local government purposes, since 1 April 2023, the village comes under the unitary authority of Somerset Council. Prior to this, it was part of the non-metropolitan district of Sedgemoor, which was formed on 1 April 1974 under the Local Government Act 1972, having previously been part of Axbridge Rural District.

It is also part of the Wells and Mendip Hills county constituency represented in the House of Commons of the Parliament of the United Kingdom. It elects one Member of Parliament (MP) by the first past the post system of election.

== Geography ==
Shipham Hill is one of the highest points in the Mendips at 1,066 feet (325 m). The village has a panorama over Weston-super-Mare and the Bristol Channel which is mentioned in The Secret Places of the Heart by H. G. Wells: But the loveliness of the weather did not fail, and the whole day was set in Severn landscapes. They first saw the great river like a sea with the Welsh mountains hanging in the sky behind as they came over the Mendip crest above Shipham.

Near to the village is GB Cave.

The 36 miles (58 km) Limestone Link Path runs from Shipham to Cold Ashton in Gloucestershire.

=== Mining ===
The substrata contain rich mineral deposits and so there were zinc and lead mines in the area. The Singing River Mine was worked in the 18th and 19th centuries for calamine (zinc carbonate), blende (zinc sulphide) and galena (lead sulphide). In the 1920s it was used as an underground reservoir by the water authorities. A small stream flows through the mine in parts. The entrance is actually in the back garden of a private house but access is allowed for potholers. The 5-metre high 19th-century calamine processor is a Grade II listed building.

The present landscape shows the piecemeal nature of the mining. Although the lead industry began to decline in the late 17th century, it revived in the mid 19th century when tips were re-worked. Its mining history has given rise to street names such as Hind Pits Lane, Hollow Road, and Comrade Avenue. The old mines have also meant that the soil is heavily contaminated by heavy metals such as cadmium. This was investigated in 1979. Concentrations of cadmium, lead and zinc in local crops were higher than would normally be expected. Copper concentrations were normal, and the results for mercury showed that mercury translocation from soil to crops was very low. Dietary copper intakes at Shipham were a little lower than national average intakes. Four participants in the duplicate diet study, or 6% of the study population, had cadmium intakes higher than 0.4 mg per week.

There is some evidence of field cultivation by the miners during the medieval period.

== Religious sites ==
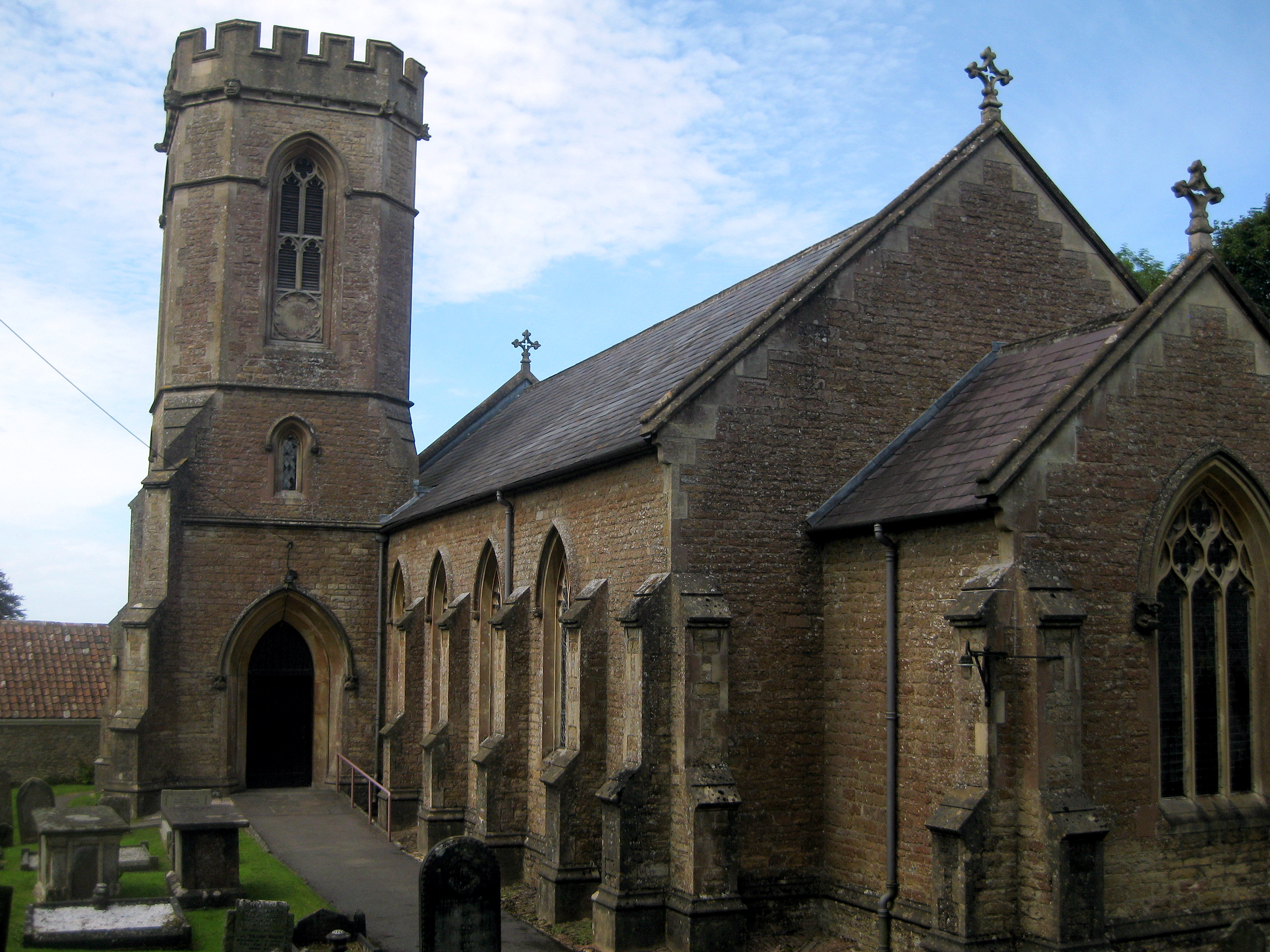
St Leonard's Church

The Anglican parish church of St Leonard was built in 1843 by James Wilson of Bath and is a Grade II listed building. Stained glass in the north window of the nave commemorates Hannah More, who as part of her work to 'civilise' the people of Cheddar and the surrounding villages, particularly the lead-miners of Shipham, established Shipham Church of England Voluntary Controlled School. A chest tomb to Amelia Day in the churchyard, 5 metres (16 ft) south of the nave, is also a listed building.

== Stock car racing ==
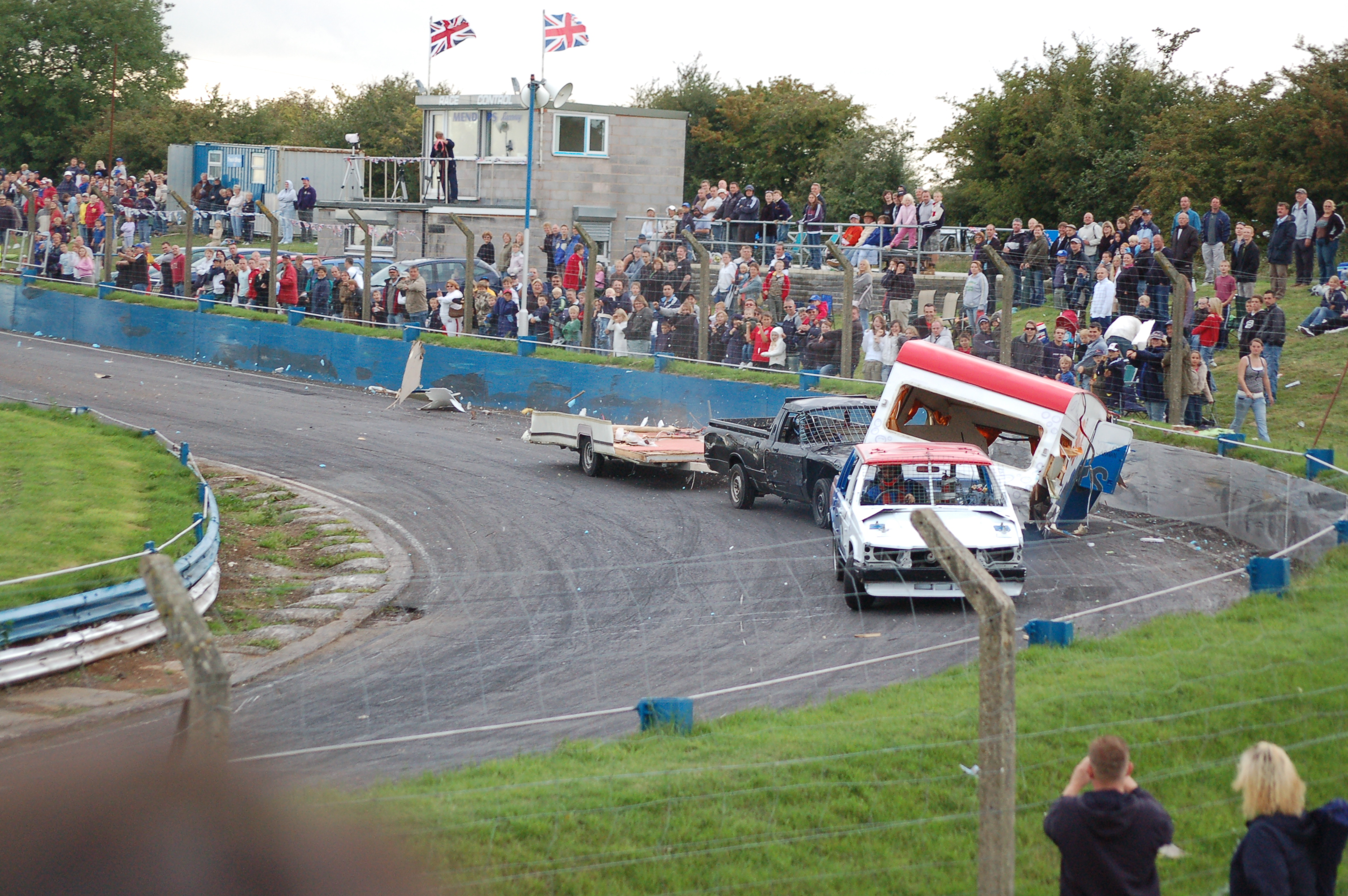
A caravan demolition race at Mendips Raceway

Near Shipham for over 40 years has flourished the ¼-mile tarmac race track of Mendips Raceway, high on the Mendips. The venue is in the bowl of an old abandoned reservoir, and features the British sport of stock-car racing. The race track is perched on the edge of Batts Combe quarry with views from the edge, across Cheddar, the Cheddar Valley towards Glastonbury Tor and the Bristol Channel.
