= Church of St Peter, North Newton =

Church in Somerset, England

Church of St Peter
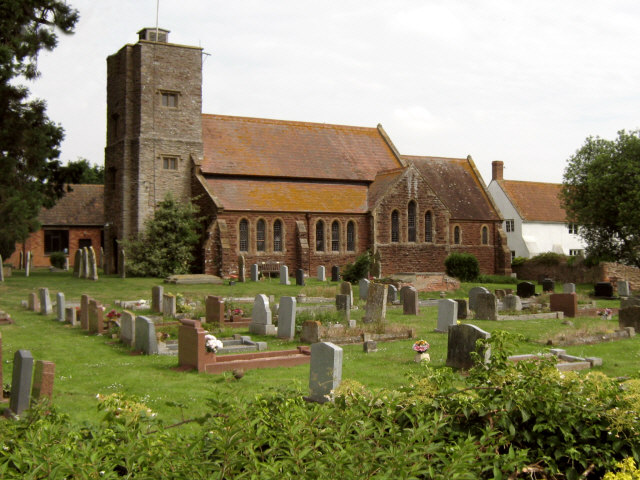

- Location within Somerset
- 51.0753°N 2.9990°W
- Location: North Newton, Somerset, England

Listed Building – Grade II*
- Official name: Church of St. Peter
- Designated: 29 March 1963
- Reference no.: 1058917

The Anglican Church of St Peter in North Newton within the English county of Somerset has a tower believed to date from Saxon times. It is a Grade II* listed building.

== History ==
In 1186 the chapel at North Newton was granted to Buckland Priory by William of Erleigh.

The two-stage tower believed to date from Saxon times but was altered in 1635. The rest of the church was rebuilt in 1885.

The parish is now part of the Alfred Jewel benefice within the Diocese of Bath and Wells. It was separated from North Petherton in 1880.

== Architecture ==
The church consists of a nave and chancel with north and south aisles. Inside there is a pulpit from 1637. The carved reredos and altar are made from wood panelling which was reused from another site.

== See also ==
- List of ecclesiastical parishes in the Diocese of Bath and Wells
