= Badgworth =

Village and civil parish in Somerset

Coordinates: 51.268°N 2.869°W

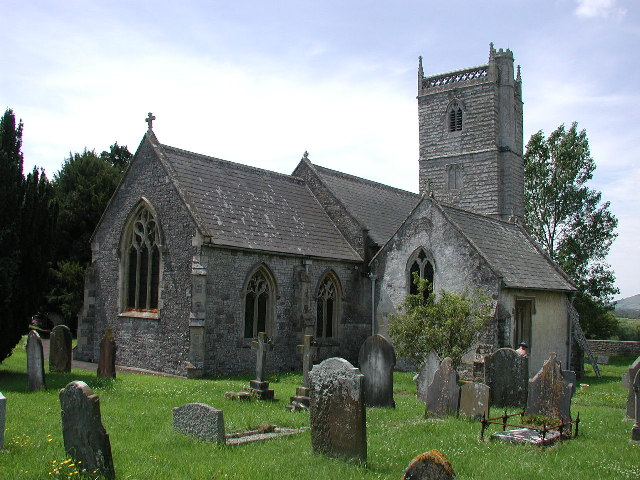
- Church of St Congar

- Location within Somerset
- Population: 525 (2011)
- OS grid reference: ST395525
- Unitary authority: Somerset Council
- Ceremonial county: Somerset
- Region: South West
- Country: England
- Sovereign state: United Kingdom
- Post town: AXBRIDGE
- Postcode district: BS26
- Dialling code: 01934
- Police: Avon and Somerset
- Fire: Devon and Somerset
- Ambulance: South Western
- UK Parliament: Wells and Mendip Hills

Badgworth is a village and civil parish in Somerset, England, 2 miles (3.2 km) south west of Axbridge. According to the 2011 census it had a population of 525.

The village is home to an equestrian centre known as the Badgworth Arena.

== History ==
The ancient village was named W. Bagewerre in 1086. The modern parish includes the villages of Biddisham where the Church of St John The Baptist dates from the 13th century but was rebuilt in the 15th century, and Tarnock the name of which is believed to be Brythonic in origin.

Late Iron Age and Romano-British pottery was found at a kiln site in the village in the 1830s. It consisted primarily of jars with bead rims and bowls with flanged or rolled rims.

The parish of Badgeworth was part of the Winterstoke Hundred, while Biddisham was part of the Bempstone hundred. A map of Winterstoake Hundred from the year 1645 shows the village name as Baddesworh; on the map, the hundred contains the parish although a later hand added a bold hundred boundary line that incorrectly separated the parish from its hundred.

Badgworth Court is a Grade II-listed Georgian manor house.

== Governance ==
The parish council has responsibility for local issues, including setting an annual precept (local rate) to cover the council's operating costs and producing annual accounts for public scrutiny. The parish council evaluates local planning applications and works with the local police, district council officers, and neighbourhood watch groups on matters of crime, security, and traffic. The parish council's role also includes initiating projects for the maintenance and repair of parish facilities, as well as consulting with the district council on the maintenance, repair, and improvement of highways, drainage, footpaths, public transport, and street cleaning. Conservation matters (including trees and listed buildings) and environmental issues are also the responsibility of the council.

For local government purposes, since 1 April 2023, the village comes under the unitary authority of Somerset Council. Prior to this, it was part of the non-metropolitan district of Sedgemoor, which was formed on 1 April 1974 under the Local Government Act 1972, having previously been part of Axbridge Rural District.

It is also part of the Wells and Mendip Hills county constituency represented in the House of Commons of the Parliament of the United Kingdom. It elects one Member of Parliament (MP) by the first past the post system of election, and was part of the South West England constituency of the European Parliament prior to Britain leaving the European Union in January 2020, which elected seven MEPs using the d'Hondt method of party-list proportional representation.

== Religious sites ==
In Badgworth the Church of St Congar, which takes its name from Congar of Congresbury, dates from the 14th century with further work in the 16th century including the west tower, which contains a bell dating from 1791 and made by Thomas and James Bilbie of the Bilbie family. It has been designated by English Heritage as a Grade II listed building. The church is on the Heritage at Risk Register due to damage to the walls and tower.
