= Thomas Watts (1689–1742) =

Thomas Watts (baptised 23 May 1689 – 18 January 1742) was a Member of Parliament for Mitchell and Tregony.

He was a son of Thomas Watts (1664–1739), vicar of Orpington, and his wife Audria Oliver (1668–1717). He married first, in 1716, Hannah Seede, widow of James Allen, and second, in 1729, Susannah Gascoyne.

Watts was prominent as an academy master in London; as a leading figure in the insurance business at the Sun Fire Office; and as a freemason.

Watts represented Mitchell in parliament from 1734 to 1741 and Tregony from 1741 until his death the next year.
