= Barford Park =

Barford House
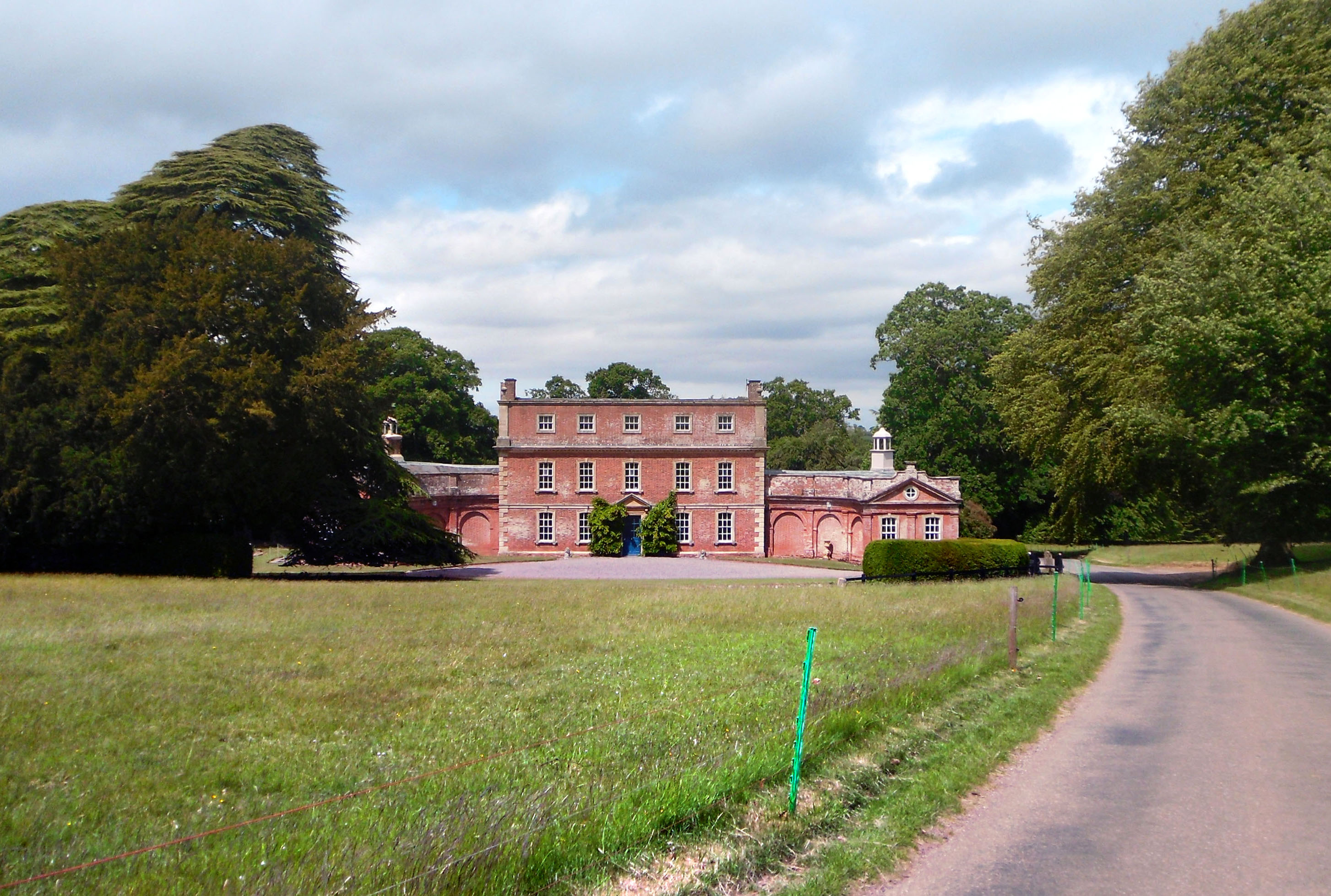

- Location within Somerset
- 51°06′59″N 03°05′48″W
- Location: Spaxton, Somerset, England

History
- Built: 1710

Listed Building – Grade II*
- Official name: Barford House
- Designated: 29 March 1963
- Reference no.: 1058941

Barford Park is a Georgian country house and park to the south of Spaxton, west of Bridgwater, Somerset, England. It was designated a grade II* listed building on 29 March 1963. The name "Barford" comes from owners of the land, who had a house on the site in the 13th and 14th centuries.

== Building ==
The current red brick house was built as a two-storey farmhouse, but the front was built in 1710 for the Jeanes family, and another storey and Baroque wings were added in the mid 18th century. The building was restored in the late 20th century by the Stancombs.

The floorplan is symmetrical around a main block with two wings. The main bock is two storeys high with an attic and five bays, while the wings are each single storey. In 2013 the house was put up for sale with an asking price of £1,650,000. The new owners carried out extensive renovation works.

The park consisted of around 40 acres (16 ha) in 1837, with a walled kitchen garden to the north of the house. The Victorian pleasure grounds included an "archery glade". A racing stables is maintained within the estate run by Kevin Bishop.

== Ownership ==
The estate was certainly owned by the Barford family by 1253, who kept ownership until at least 1810, at which point Anne Barford, the sole heir married John Evered. The estate remained with the Evered family and in the early 20th century, the building was owned by John Guy Courtney Evered, who inherited it from his father and died in 1931 shortly after his 100th birthday. Evered had fought in the Crimean War and was the "oldest living Etonian" at the time of his death. Barford House was bought by the Stamcomb family in 1953, who owned the house until 2012.
