= Enmore Castle =

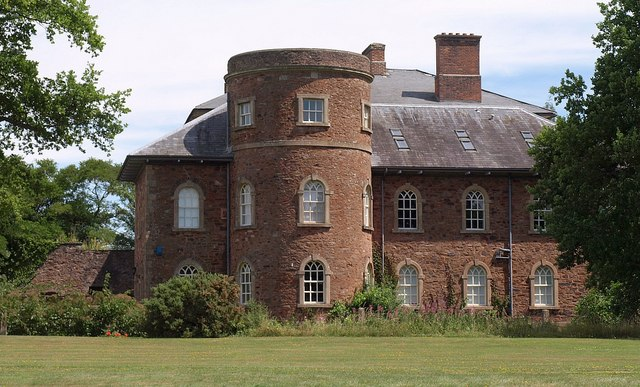

- Location within Somerset
- 51°06′42″N 3°05′22″W
- Location: Enmore, Somerset, England

History
- Built: 1751-1755

Listed Building – Grade II
- Designated: 9 January 1987
- Reference no.: 1307522

Enmore Castle is a historic building in the village of Enmore, Somerset, England. It is a Grade II listed building.

== Construction ==
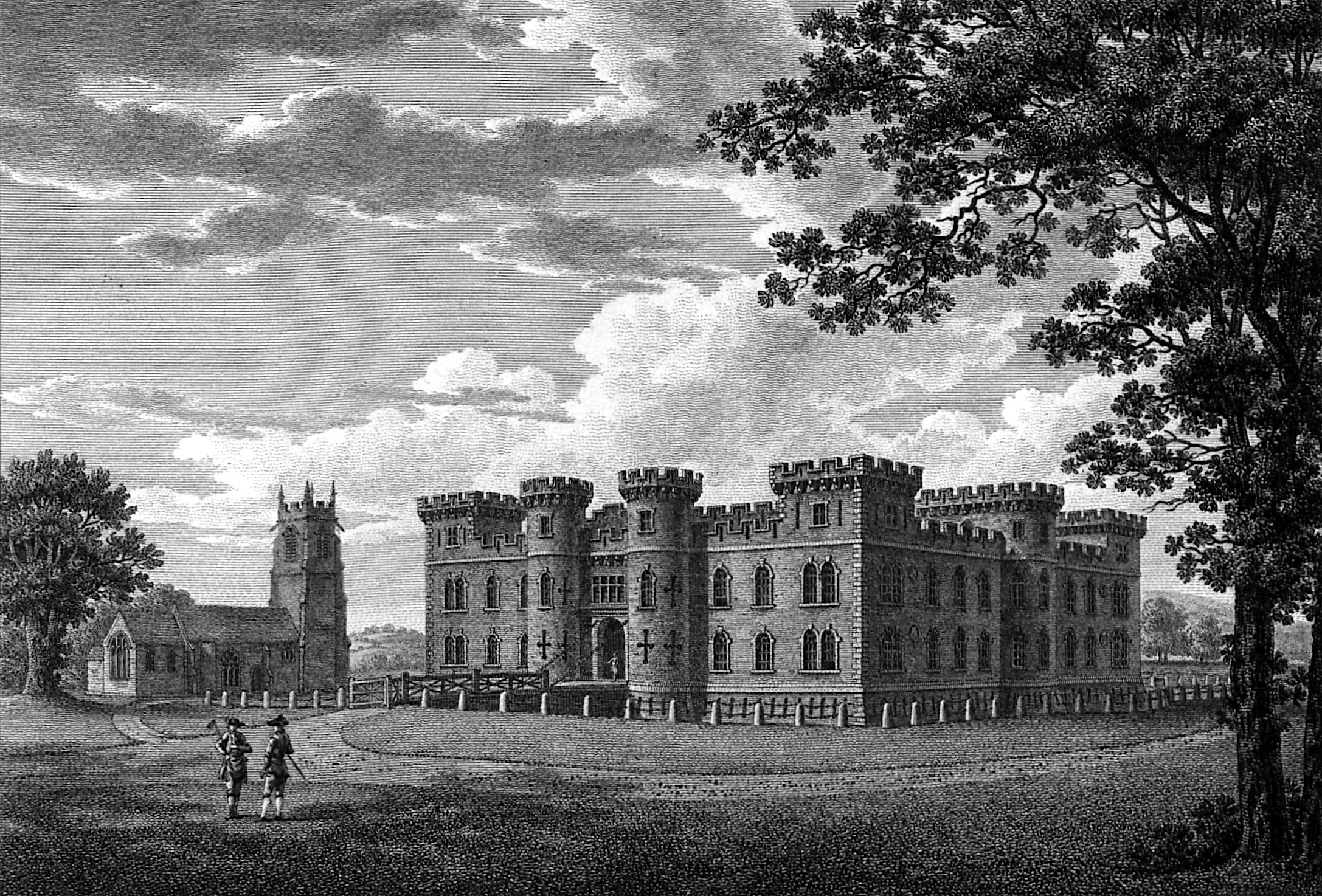
Enmore Castle in 1779

Enmore was the seat of the family of William Malet who built a great house, although the original date of construction is uncertain. The house passed to Elizabeth Malet who married John Wilmot, 2nd Earl of Rochester. In 1664 it included a hall, chapel and 20 hearths. The building was still standing in 1727.

It was bought at some time before 1751 by John Perceval, 2nd Earl of Egmont who over the next five years erected the first version of the present castle. The building consisted of a square surround an inner court which was 86 feet (26 m) by 78 feet (24 m). The surrounding walls had square towers at the corners and semicircular turrets on each of the sides including around the doors, all were topped with battlements. Much of the building, including the offices and stables, was underground and accessed via the dry 40 feet (12 m) wide moat which was entered by a tunnel from the park. There is some evidence of a drawbridge over the moat and Stew ponds. It included an armoury, music and picture galleries, a library, and a state dining room. The rooms were hung with tapestries which, after their sale were hung at Combe Sydenham and subsequently in the Bridgwater council chamber. The house received 'the dismissive mockery of Horace Walpole'.

== 19th century ==
The Percevals were forced to sell the castle in 1833 to pay off debts. It was bought by Nicholas Broadmead, a solicitor with shares in the Parrett Navigation Company and the Ivelchester and Langport Navigation, who demolished a large proportion of the building the following year, converting the remaining parts of the building into a three-storeyed house.

== 20th century ==
The castle once again underwent major change in 1930 when H. H. Broadmead demolished even more of the old building. Wood panels removed from the castle at this time were incorporated into the Publishing House for the Christian Science Publishing Society in Boston, Massachusetts, USA.

The remaining portion is now divided into two dwellings, however the undercroft survives.

It is close to the Church of St Michael which has 13th-century origins but the present building is largely from the 15th century, and Enmore Park Golf Club which was built on some of the parkland which was attached to the estate.
