= Spaxton =

Village in Somerset, England

Coordinates: 51°07′30″N 3°06′27″W

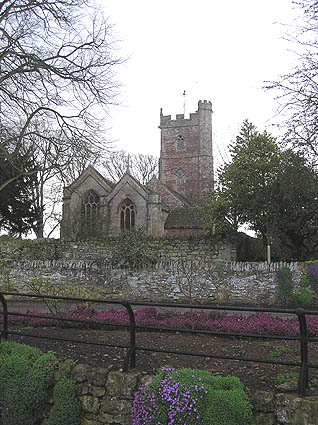
- St. Margaret's church

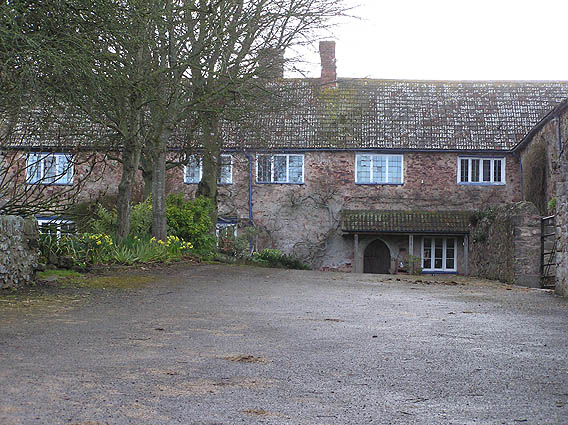
- Court Farm

- Location within Somerset
- Population: 1,051 (in 2021)
- OS grid reference: ST225375
- Unitary authority: Somerset Council
- Ceremonial county: Somerset
- Region: South West
- Country: England
- Sovereign state: United Kingdom
- Post town: BRIDGWATER
- Postcode district: TA5
- Dialling code: 01278
- Police: Avon and Somerset
- Fire: Devon and Somerset
- Ambulance: South Western
- UK Parliament: Bridgwater
- Website: Parish Council

Spaxton is a small village and civil parish on the Quantocks in Somerset, South West England. The village is about 5 miles (8 km) west of Bridgwater. Other settlements in the parish include Charlynch, Courtway, Four Forks, Gothelney Green, Merridge, and Splatt. The population of the parish at the 2021 census was 1,051.

== History ==
The name of Spaxton may originate from Spakr, a Dane who settled in the area in about the 9th century. An alternative derivation is that it means "councillor's enclosure", from the Old English spæcas and tun. It is recorded as Spachestone in the 1086 Domesday Book, when the land was held by Alfred of Spain.

Spaxton was part of the hundred of Cannington.

The National Gazetteer (1868) says:

"SPAXTON, a parish in the hundred of Cannington, county Somerset, 6 miles W. of Bridgwater, its post town, and 3 from Nether Stowey. The village is situated under the Quantock hills. The parish includes the hamlets of Courtway and Merridge. The soil consists of red clay, with a subsoil of stone. The living is a rectory* in the diocese of Bath and Wells, value £594. The church, dedicated to St. Margaret, has a square tower containing a clock and five bells. The register dates from 1558. The parochial charities produce about £106 per annum, of which £68 go to Cooke's school, almshouses, &c. There is a National school for both sexes, also a Sunday-school. The Baptists and Wesleyans have each a chapel. Lord Taunton is lord of the manor."

The modern parish includes the ancient parishes of Aisholt and Charlynch. Aisholt is one of the Thankful Villages – those villages that suffered no fatalities during the Great War of 1914–1918. Aisholt is featured on Darren Hayman's album, Thankful Villages Volume 1.

During the 19th century, Henry James Prince, former curate of Charlynch founded the notorious religious cult of the Agapemone at Four Forks.

== Governance ==
The parish council has responsibility for local issues, including setting an annual precept (local rate) to cover the council's operating costs and producing annual accounts for public scrutiny. The parish council evaluates local planning applications and works with the local police, district council officers, and neighbourhood watch groups on matters of crime, security, and traffic. The parish council's role also includes initiating projects for the maintenance and repair of parish facilities, as well as consulting with the district council on the maintenance, repair, and improvement of highways, drainage, footpaths, public transport, and street cleaning. Conservation matters (including trees and listed buildings) and environmental issues are also the responsibility of the council.

For local government purposes, since 1 April 2023, the village comes under the unitary authority of Somerset Council. Prior to this, it was part of the non-metropolitan district of Sedgemoor, which was formed on 1 April 1974 under the Local Government Act 1972, having previously been part of Bridgwater Rural District.

It is also part of the Bridgwater county constituency, represented in the House of Commons of the Parliament of the United Kingdom. It elects one Member of Parliament (MP) by the first past the post system of election.

== Geography ==
Near the village is Hawkridge Reservoir which supplies water for Bridgwater, constructed between 1960 and 1962, and the Ashford Reservoir which was constructed in 1932.

== Landmarks and notable buildings ==
Gothelney Hall at Gothelney Green was built in the 15th century and has been designated as a Grade I listed building.

Barford Park is in the south of the parish.

Parts of Court Farm near St Margaret's Church date from c.1500.

== Religious sites ==
- The Church of St Margaret has some parts from the 12th and 13th centuries but is predominantly from the 15th century, and was restored in 1895. It has been designated by English Heritage as a Grade I listed building.
- The Church of All Saints, Aisholt dates from the 14th and 15th centuries.
- In Charlynch (or Charlinch) the Church of St Mary has been deconsecrated.
- The former Methodist Chapel is on the main road through the village.

== Gallery ==
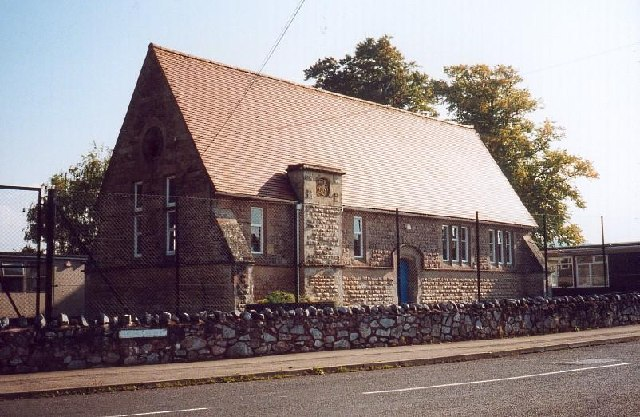
Spaxton school

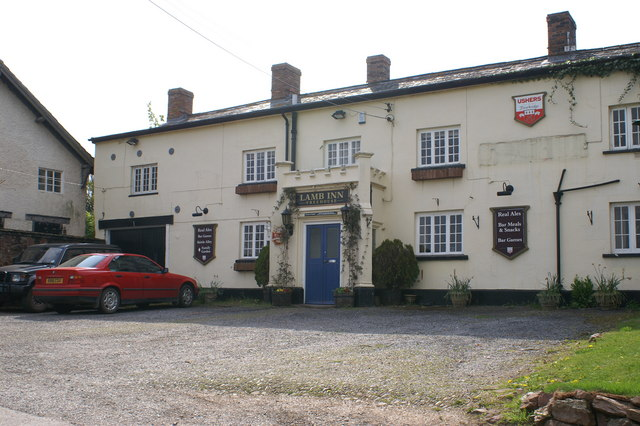
The Lamb Inn
