= Chris Phillips (chief executive) =

Chris Phillips (1956–2007) was a Chief Executive of Scottish Widows (a life, pensions and investment company located in Edinburgh, Scotland) who lost his life in a mountaineering accident.

Phillips was educated at Sexey's Grammar School and Oxford University. His first job was as Policy Advisor to the Social Democratic Party. He joined Scottish Widows from Royal London Asset Management. At the time of his death he was on gardening leave while waiting to join Morley as their CEO. He close to spend that time walking the Camino de Santiago, a pilgrim's way, to the shrine of the apostle St. James the Great in northwestern Spain. He was found in deep snow near Roncesvalles.

Business positions
Preceded by Bill Main	CEO of Scottish Widows Investment Partnership; 2003–2007	Succeeded by Dean Buckley
