= Hugh Sexey Church of England Middle School =

School in Blackford, Somerset, England

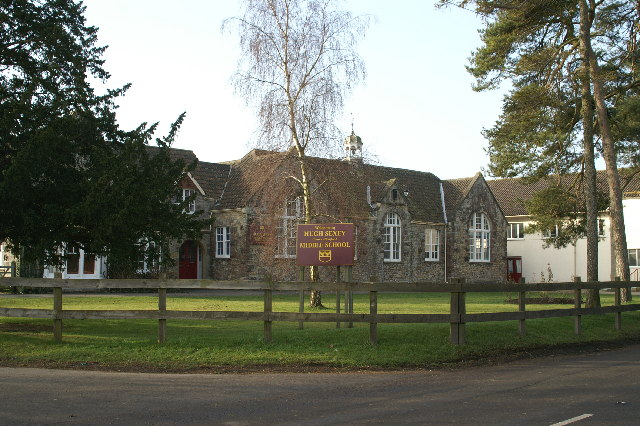

Location
- Blackford, Somerset, BS28 4ND; England; 51.2228°N 2.8423°W

Information
- Type: Middle school (deemed secondary); Academy
- Motto: Benignus esto, Diligenter labora (Latin for Be Kind, Work Hard)
- Religious affiliation: Church of England
- Established: 1897 as Sexey's School; 1948 as Sexey's Grammar School; 1976 as Hugh Sexey Church of England Middle School
- Local authority: Somerset County Council
- Trust: Wessex Learning Trust
- Department for Education URN: 143329 Tables
- Ofsted: Reports
- Head teacher: Paul Tatterton
- Gender: Coeducational
- Age: 9 to 13
- Enrolment: 620 in June 2012
- Houses: Saxons, Vikings, Normans, Celts
- Alumni: Old Sexonians
- Website: www.hughsexey.com

Hugh Sexey Church of England Middle School, formerly known as Sexey's School and Sexey's Grammar School, is a coeducational middle school located in Blackford near Wedmore, Somerset, England. The school had 620 pupils in June 2012, who join aged 9 in Year 5 and stay until age 13 in Year 8, after which they go to The Kings of Wessex Academy in Cheddar. Because the school educates pupils of secondary school age it has middle deemed secondary status. The school had been rated outstanding by Ofsted, but as of January 2023 had not been inspected since conversion to an Academy on 10 December 2016. It is part of the Wessex Learning Trust with other schools in the Cheddar Valley area.

== History ==
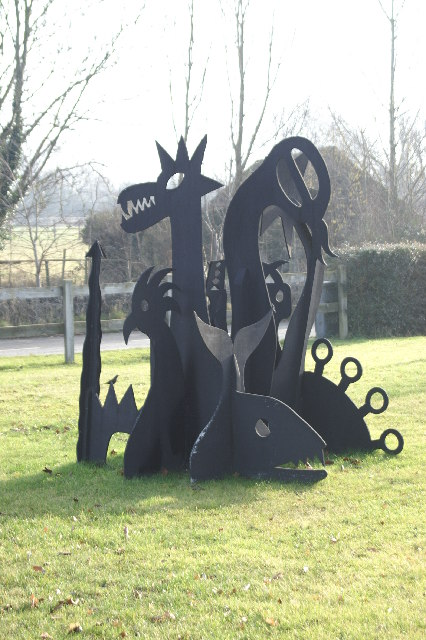
Sculpture designed as a Beacon Project by a combined group of Year 4 pupils from Lympsham First School, working with Year 8 pupils from Hugh Sexey. This statue ceased to exist on 8 September 2011 and was replaced by a willow sculpture designed by Year 6 pupils.

The school is named after Hugh Sexey (1556–1619), a royal auditor of the Exchequer to Queen Elizabeth I and later King James I. After his death the trustees of his will established Sexey's Hospital in Bruton as an institution to care for the elderly, and Sexey's School in Bruton, which still exists today.

Sexey's School in Blackford was originally opened in 1897 in a barn in nearby Stoughton, with 13 pupils. The Blackford site opened in 1899 with around 60 pupils, of which around 20 were boarders. It became Sexey's Grammar School in 1948, and ceased to be a boarding school in 1966. The 1976 Education Act abolished the tripartite education system of grammar and secondary modern schools in England and Wales. Up to this point, the area was served by Sexey's Grammar School in Blackford, and The Kings of Wessex School (a secondary modern school) in nearby Cheddar. In 1976, the three-tier Cheddar Valley Community Learning Partnership was established, creating a system of first, middle and comprehensive upper schools in the area. The Kings of Wessex School became a comprehensive, Sexey's Grammar School became Hugh Sexey Middle School serving half of the Cheddar Valley, and Fairlands Middle School was established to serve the other half.

In September 2010, Hugh Sexey was one of the first two middle schools in England to be awarded specialist Technology College status.

Previously a voluntary controlled school administered by Somerset County Council, in November 2016 Hugh Sexey Church of England Middle School converted to academy status. The school is now sponsored by the Wessex Learning Trust.

== Notable former pupils ==
- Sophie Luff (born 1993), cricketer

Sexey's Grammar School

- Chris Phillips (1956–2007), former chief executive of Scottish Widows
