= Fairlands Middle School =

Location
- Masons Way; Cheddar, Somerset, BS27 3PG; England; 51.2751°N 2.7712°W

Information
- Type: Academy; Middle-deemed-secondary
- Motto: Caring and Inspirational
- Established: 1976
- Local authority: Somerset County Council
- Trust: Wessex Learning Trust
- Department for Education URN: 147825 Tables
- Ofsted: Reports
- Headteacher: Rebecca Bennet
- Gender: Coeducational
- Age: 9 to 13
- Enrolment: 493 in 2023
- Website: fairlands.somerset.sch.uk

Fairlands Middle School is a coeducational middle school with roughly 522 pupils aged between 9 and 13 in 2012, located in Cheddar, Somerset, England.

The school, which was established in 1976, is a middle-deemed-secondary school, meaning that it takes pupils of secondary school age while providing both Key Stage 2 and Key Stage 3 education. Fairlands is part of the Cheddar Valley Community Learning Partnership, a three-tier education system which comprises nine first schools, two middle schools and one secondary school. Pupils enter Fairlands from first schools in Cheddar and the nearby villages of Draycott, Shipham and Axbridge. In year 9 pupils move to The Kings of Wessex Academy, also in Cheddar.

== History ==
The 1976 Education Act abolished the tripartite education system of grammar and secondary modern schools in England and Wales. Up to this point, the area was served by The Kings of Wessex School secondary modern and Sexey's Grammar School in Blackford near Wedmore. In 1976, the three-tier Cheddar Valley Community Learning Partnership was established, creating a system of first, middle and comprehensive upper schools in the area. The Kings of Wessex School became a comprehensive, Sexey's Grammar School became Hugh Sexey Church of England Middle School serving half of the Cheddar Valley, and Fairlands Middle School was established to serve the other half.

In September 2010, Fairlands was one of the first two middle schools in England to be awarded specialist Technology College status.

In 2011, Fairlands was twinned with School 108 in the central Russian city of Yekaterinburg, as part of the BBC Olympic Dreams project. Both schools will use the partnership for cultural exchange, and followed the progress of high jumper and former School 108 pupil Ivan Ukhov in the 2012 Summer Olympics.

Previously a community school administered by Somerset County Council, in April 2020 Fairlands Middle School converted to academy status. The school is now sponsored by the Wessex Learning Trust.

== Academic performance ==
In 2010, 68% of pupils achieved Level 4 in mathematics and English in the National Curriculum assessment for Key Stage 2. This was below the national average of 73% and the Somerset County Council average of 75%, and a drop on the school's achievement for the previous four years. In 2009, an inspection by Ofsted rated the school as good on a four-point scale of outstanding, good, satisfactory, and poor. The report praised the school's standard of education, leadership, teaching and expectations by both staff and pupils, all of which had improved since the previous inspection in 2006.

== Notable pupils ==
Notable pupils at the school include comedian Richard Herring, whose father was headteacher at The Kings of Wessex School.

== See also ==
- List of middle schools in England
