= Cheddar, Somerset =

Village in Somerset, England

Coordinates: 51.279°N 2.778°W

Cheddar
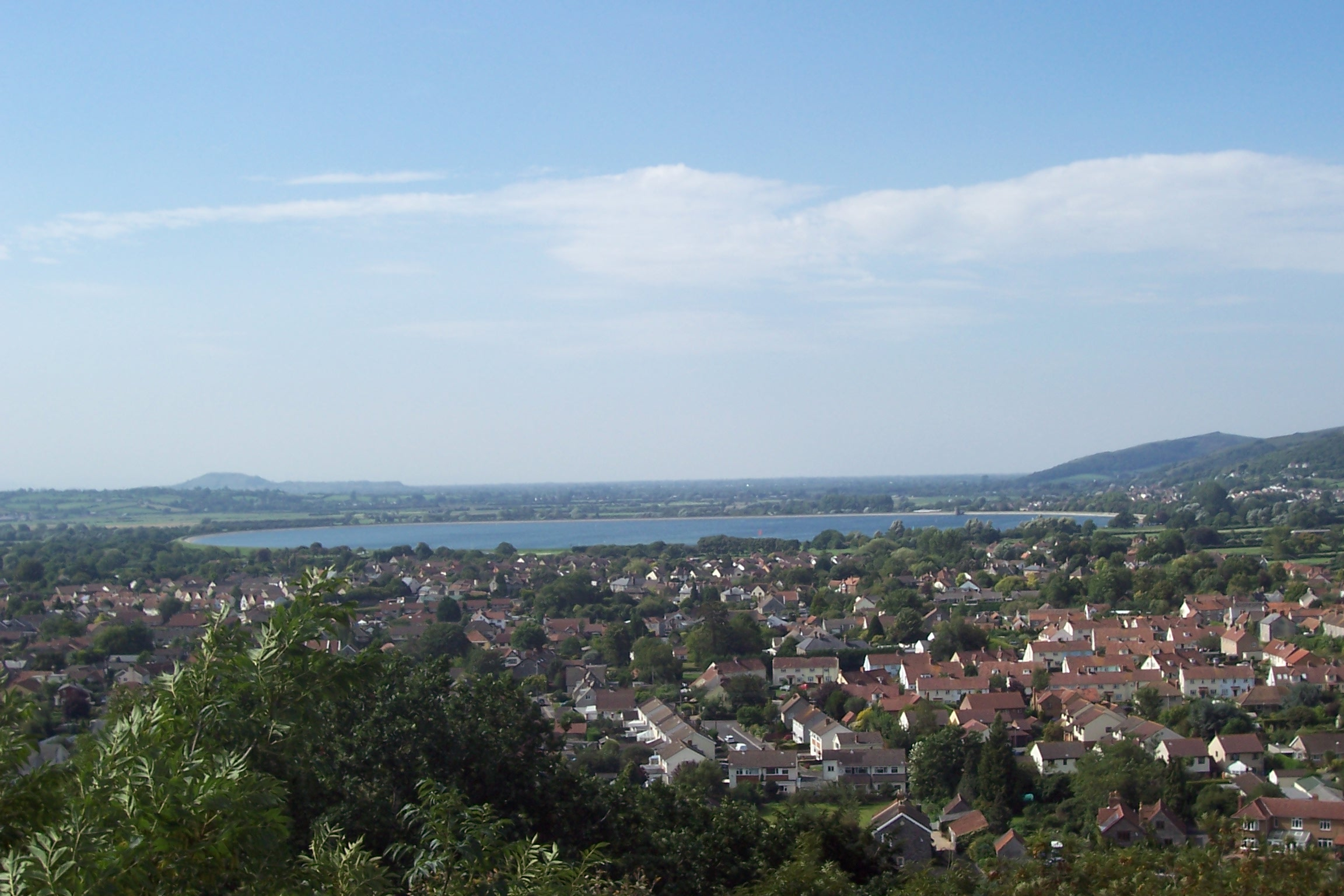
- Cheddar village, looking due west from the tower at Jacob's Ladder

- Location within Somerset
- Population: 5,755 (2011)
- OS grid reference: ST458535
- Unitary authority: Somerset Council
- Ceremonial county: Somerset
- Region: South West
- Country: England
- Sovereign state: United Kingdom
- Post town: CHEDDAR
- Postcode district: BS27
- Dialling code: 01934
- Police: Avon and Somerset
- Fire: Devon and Somerset
- Ambulance: South Western
- UK Parliament: Wells and Mendip Hills

Cheddar (UK: /ˈtʃɛd.ər/) is a large village and civil parish in the English county of Somerset. It is situated on the southern edge of the Mendip Hills, 9 miles (14 km) north-west of Wells, 11 miles (18 km) south-east of Weston-super-Mare and 18 miles (29 km) south-west of Bristol. The civil parish includes the hamlets of Nyland and Bradley Cross. The parish had a population of 5,755 in 2011 and an acreage of 8,592 acres (3,477 ha) as of 1961.

Cheddar Gorge, on the northern edge of the village, is the largest gorge in the United Kingdom and includes several show caves, including Gough's Cave. The gorge has been a centre of human settlement since Neolithic times, including a Saxon palace. It has a temperate climate and provides a unique geological and biological environment that has been recognised by the designation of several Sites of Special Scientific Interest. It is also the site of several limestone quarries. The village gave its name to Cheddar cheese and has been a centre for strawberry growing. The crop was formerly transported on the Cheddar Valley rail line, which closed in the late 1960s and is now a cycle path. The village is now a major tourist destination with several cultural and community facilities, including the Cheddar Show Caves Museum.

The village supports a variety of community groups including religious, sporting and cultural organisations. Several of these are based on the site of the Kings of Wessex Academy, which is the largest educational establishment.

== History ==
Richard Coates, Professor Emeritus of Linguistics at the University of the West of England, has suggested that the name is Ciw-dor, 'the door to Chew', referencing an idea that the gorge marked an important routeway through at least part of the Mendip watershed, and giving access between two large and important estates which had probably been a part of the Wessex royal demesne from the 7th century.

There is evidence of occupation from the Neolithic period in Cheddar. Britain's oldest complete human skeleton, Cheddar Man, estimated to be 9,000 years old, was found in Cheddar Gorge in 1903. Older remains from the Upper Late Palaeolithic era (12,000–13,000 years ago) have been found. There is some evidence of a Bronze Age field system at the Batts Combe quarry site. There is also evidence of Bronze Age barrows at the mound in the Longwood valley, which if man-made it is likely to be a field system. The remains of a Roman villa have been excavated in the grounds of the current vicarage.

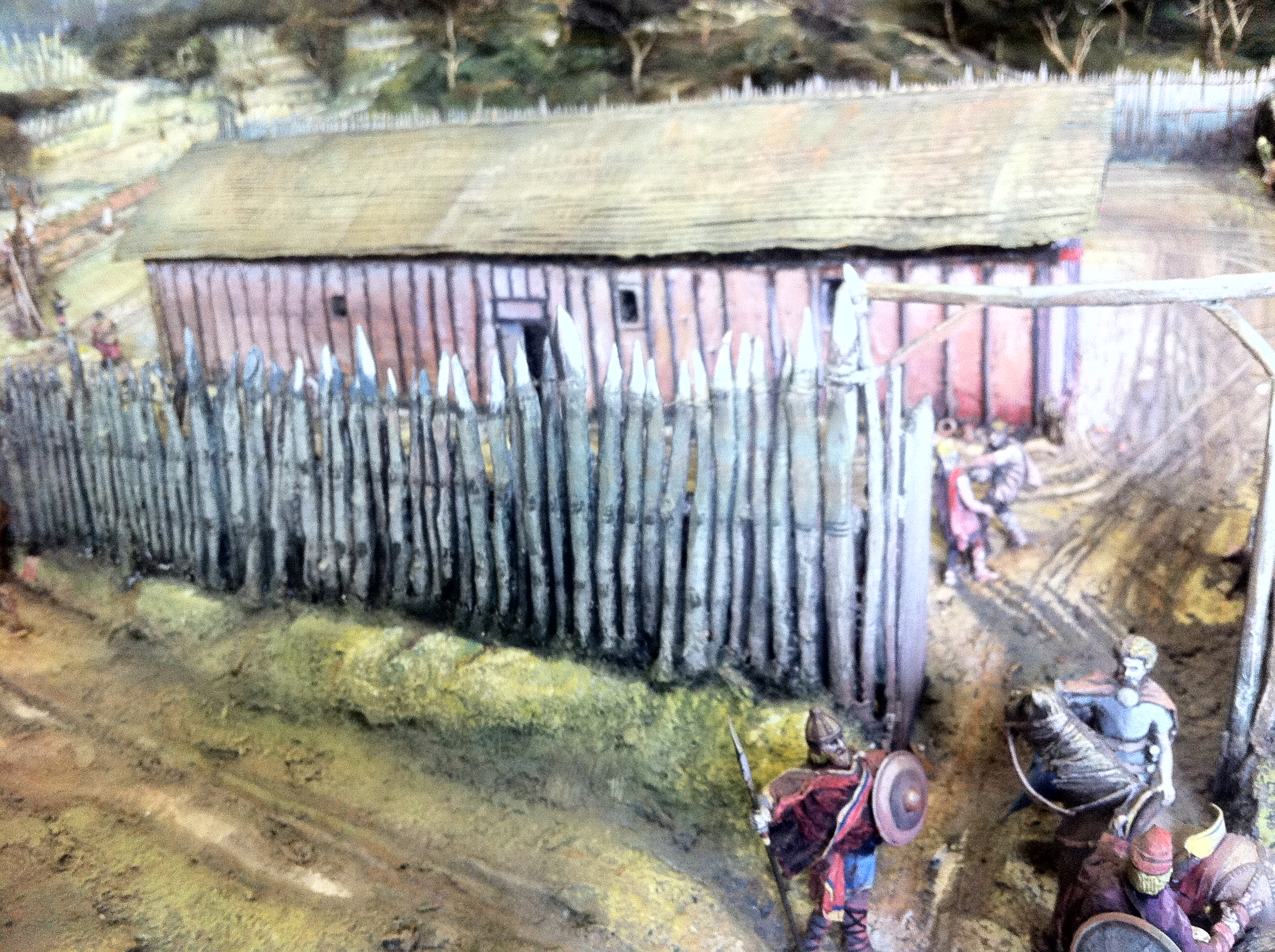
Reconstruction drawing of the Saxon royal palace at Cheddar around 1000 AD

The village of Cheddar had been important during the Roman and Saxon eras. There was a royal palace at Cheddar during the Saxon period, which was used on three occasions in the 10th century to host the Witenagemot. The ruins of the palace were excavated in the 1960s. They are located on the grounds of the Kings of Wessex Academy, together with a 14th-century chapel dedicated to St. Columbanus. Roman remains have also been uncovered at the site. Cheddar was listed in the Domesday Book of 1086 as Cedre.

As early as 1130 AD, the Cheddar Gorge was recognised as one of the "Four wonders of England". Historically, Cheddar's source of wealth was farming and cheese making for which it was famous as early as 1170 AD. In the post-Conquest period, Cheddar emerges as a member of Somerset's Winterstoke Hundred. However, Frank Thorn has suggested that at a far earlier period, Cheddar lay at the centre of its own small hundred, and that it acted as the head place (or caput) of a coherent group of three hundreds, namely Cheddar itself, Winterstoke and Bempstone (the latter containing Brent and Wedmore).

In 1337, the manor of Cheddar was disafforested, removing it from the jurisdiction of the royal Forest of Mendip and transferring full control to Bishop Ralph.

As early as 1527 there are records of watermills on the river. In the 17th and 18th centuries, there were several watermills which ground corn and made paper, with 13 mills on the Yeo at the peak, declining to seven by 1791 and just three by 1915. In the Victorian era it also became a centre for the production of clothing. The last mill, used as a shirt factory, closed in the early 1950s.

Cheddar Inclosure Act 1795
- Act of Parliament
- Parliament of Great Britain
- Long title: An act for dividing, allotting, and inclosing, the open and commonable lands, within the parish of Cheddar, in the county of Somerset.
- Citation: 35 Geo. 3. c. 39 Pr.
- Territorial extent: Great Britain

Dates
- Royal assent: 28 April 1795
- Commencement: 28 April 1795 (Note: The Acts of Parliament (Commencement) Act 1793.)

Status: Current legislation

William Wilberforce saw the poor conditions of the locals when he visited Cheddar in 1789. He inspired Hannah More in her work to improve the conditions of the Mendip miners and agricultural workers. In 1801, 4,400 acres (18 km^{2}) of common land were enclosed under the Cheddar Inclosure Act 1795 (35 Geo. 3. c. 39 Pr.).

Cheddar remained a more dispersed dairy-farming village until the advent of tourism and the arrival of the railway in the Victorian era. Tourism of the Cheddar gorge and caves began with the opening of the Cheddar Valley Railway in 1869.

Cheddar, its surrounding villages and specifically the gorge has been subject to flooding. In the Chew Stoke flood of 1968 the flow of water washed large boulders down the gorge, washed away cars, and damaged the cafe and the entrance to Gough's Cave.

== Government ==
Cheddar is recognised as a village. The adjacent settlement of Axbridge, although only about a third the population of Cheddar, is a town. This apparently illogical situation is explained by the relative importance of the two places in historic times. While Axbridge grew in importance as a centre for cloth manufacturing in the Tudor period and gained a charter from King John, Cheddar remained a more dispersed mining and dairy-farming village. Its population grew with the arrival of the railways in the Victorian era and the advent of tourism.

The parish council, which has 15 members who are elected for four years, is responsible for local issues, including setting an annual precept (local rate) to cover the council's operating costs and producing annual accounts for public scrutiny. The parish council evaluates local planning applications and works with the police, district council officers, and neighbourhood watch groups on matters of crime, security, and traffic. The parish council's role also includes initiating projects for the maintenance and repair of parish facilities, as well as consulting with the district council on the maintenance, repair, and improvement of highways, drainage, footpaths, public transport, and street cleaning. Conservation matters (including trees and listed buildings) and environmental issues are also the responsibility of the council.

The village is in the 'Cheddar and Shipham' electoral ward. After including Shipham the total population of the ward taken at the 2011 census is 6,842.

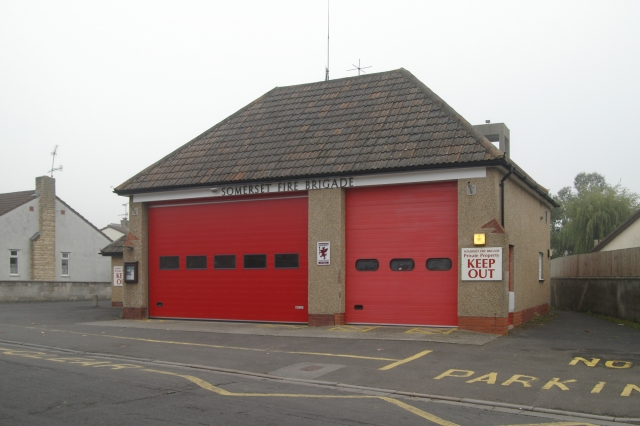
Cheddar Fire Station has a crew of retained firefighters.

For local government purposes, since 1 April 2023, the village comes under the unitary authority of Somerset Council. Prior to this, it was part of the non-metropolitan district of Sedgemoor, which was formed on 1 April 1974 under the Local Government Act 1972, having previously been part of Axbridge Rural District. Fire, police and ambulance services are provided jointly with other authorities through the Devon and Somerset Fire and Rescue Service, Avon and Somerset Constabulary and the South Western Ambulance Service.

It is also part of the Wells and Mendip Hills county constituency represented in the House of Commons of the Parliament of the United Kingdom. It elects one Member of Parliament (MP) by the first past the post system of election. Prior to Brexit in 2020, it was part of the South West England constituency of the European Parliament.

== International relations ==
Cheddar is twinned with Felsberg, Germany and Vernouillet, France, and it has an active programme of exchange visits. Initially, Cheddar twinned with Felsberg in 1984. In 2000, Cheddar twinned with Vernouillet, which had also been twinned with Felsberg. Cheddar also has a friendship link with Ocho Rios in Saint Ann Parish, Jamaica.

It is also twinned with the commune of Descartes in the Indre-et-Loire department.

== Geography ==
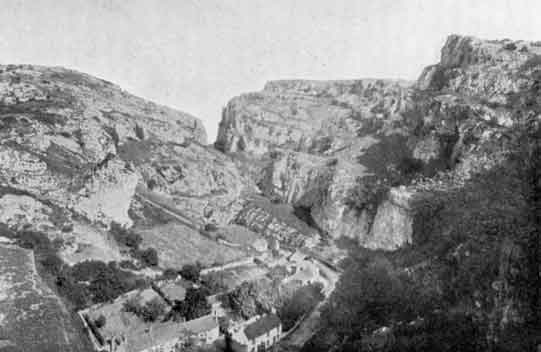
Cheddar Gorge c. 1907

The area is underlain by Black Rock slate, Burrington Oolite and Clifton Down Limestone of the Carboniferous Limestone Series, which contain ooliths and fossil debris on top of Old Red Sandstone, and by Dolomitic Conglomerate of the Keuper. Evidence for Variscan orogeny is seen in the sheared rock and cleaved shales. In many places weathering of these strata has resulted in the formation of immature calcareous soils.

=== Gorge and caves ===
Cheddar Gorge, which is located on the edge of the village, is the largest gorge in the United Kingdom. The gorge is the site of the Cheddar Caves, where Cheddar Man was found in 1903. Older remains from the Upper Late Palaeolithic era (12,000–13,000 years ago) have been found. The caves, produced by the activity of an underground river, contain stalactites and stalagmites. Gough's Cave, which was discovered in 1903, leads around 400 m (437 yd) into the rock-face, and contains a variety of large rock chambers and formations. Cox's Cave, discovered in 1837, is smaller but contains many intricate formations. A further cave houses a children's entertainment walk known as the "Crystal Quest".

Cheddar Gorge, including Cox's Cave, Gough's Cave and other attractions, has become a tourist destination, attracting about 500,000 visitors per year. In a 2005 poll of Radio Times readers, following its appearance on the 2005 television programme Seven Natural Wonders, Cheddar Gorge was named as the second greatest natural wonder in Britain, surpassed only by the Dan yr Ogof caves.

=== Sites of Special Scientific Interest ===
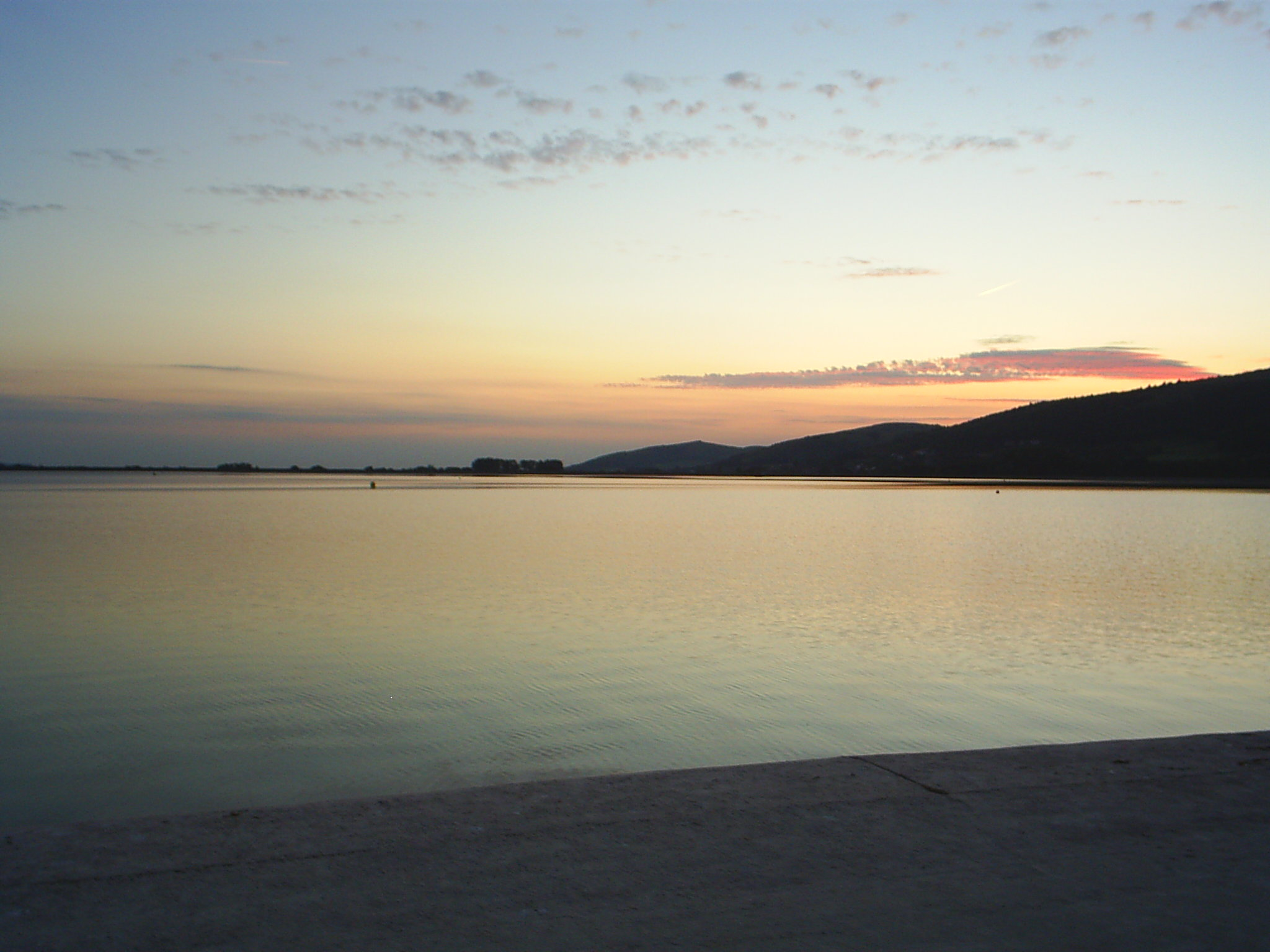
Cheddar Reservoir at dusk, looking towards the western edge of the Mendip Hills and Crook Peak

There are several large and unique Sites of Special Scientific Interest (SSSI) around the village.

Cheddar Reservoir is a near-circular artificial reservoir operated by Bristol Water. Dating from the 1930s, it has a capacity of 135 million gallons (614,000 cubic metres). The reservoir is supplied with water taken from the Cheddar Yeo, which rises in Gough's Cave in Cheddar Gorge and is a tributary of the River Axe. The inlet grate for the 54-inch (1.4 m) water pipe that is used to transport the water can be seen next to the sensory garden in Cheddar Gorge. It has been designated as a Site of Special Scientific Interest (SSSI) due to its wintering waterfowl populations.

Cheddar Wood and the smaller Macall's Wood form a biological Site of Special Scientific Interest from what remains of the wood of the Bishops of Bath and Wells in the 13th century and of King Edmund the Magnificent's wood in the 10th. During the 19th century, its lower fringes were grubbed out to make strawberry fields. Most of these have been allowed to revert to woodland. The wood was coppiced until 1917. This site compromises a wide range of habitats which include ancient and secondary semi-natural broadleaved woodland, unimproved neutral grassland, and a complex mosaic of calcareous grassland and acidic dry dwarf-shrub heath. Cheddar Wood is one of only a few English stations for starved wood-sedge (Carex depauperata). Purple gromwell (Lithospermum purpurocaeruleum), a nationally rare plant, also grows in the wood. Butterflies include silver-washed fritillary (Argynnis paphia), dark green fritillary (Argynnis aglaja), pearl-bordered fritillary (Boloria euphrosyne), holly blue (Celastrina argiolus) and brown argus (Aricia agestis). The slug Arion fasciatus, which has a restricted distribution in the south of England, and the soldier beetle Cantharis fusca also occur.

By far the largest of the SSSIs is called Cheddar Complex and covers 441.3 hectares (1,090.5 acres) of the gorge, caves and the surrounding area. It is important because of both biological and geological features. It includes four SSSIs, formerly known as Cheddar Gorge SSSI, August Hole/Longwood Swallet SSSI, GB Cavern Charterhouse SSSI and Charterhouse on-Mendip SSSI. It is partly owned by the National Trust who acquired it in 1910 and partly managed by the Somerset Wildlife Trust.

=== Quarries ===
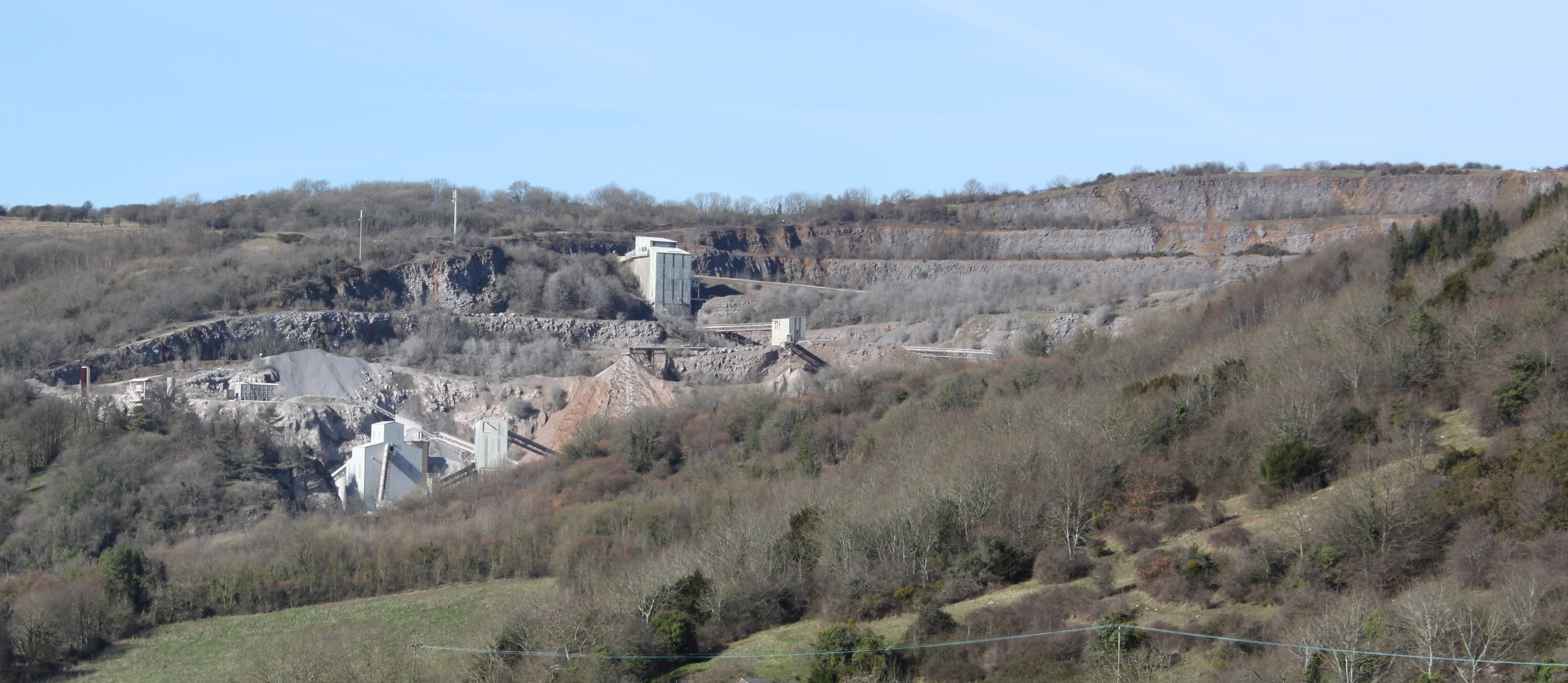
Batts Combe Quarry from the lookout tower above Cheddar Gorge

Close to the village and gorge are Batts Combe quarry and Callow Rock quarry, two of the active Quarries of the Mendip Hills where limestone is still extracted. Operating since the early 20th century, Batts Combe is owned and operated by Hanson Aggregates. The output in 2005 was around 4,000 tonnes of limestone per day, one third of which was supplied to an on-site lime kiln, which closed in 2009; the remainder was sold as coated or dusted aggregates. The limestone at this site is close to 99 percent carbonate of calcium and magnesium (dolomite).

The Chelmscombe Quarry finished its work as a limestone quarry in the 1950s and was then used by the Central Electricity Generating Board as a tower testing station. During the 1970s and 1980s it was also used to test the ability of containers of radioactive material to withstand impacts and other accidents.

=== Climate ===
Along with the rest of South West England, Cheddar has a temperate climate which is generally wetter and milder than the rest of the country. The annual mean temperature is approximately 10 °C (50.0 °F). Seasonal temperature variation is less extreme than most of the United Kingdom because of the adjacent sea, which moderates temperature. The summer months of July and August are the warmest with mean daily maxima of approximately 21 °C (69.8 °F). In winter mean minimum temperatures of 1 or 2 °C (33.8 or 35.6 °F) are common. In the summer the Azores high-pressure system affects the south-west of England. Convective cloud sometimes forms inland, reducing the number of hours of sunshine; annual sunshine rates are slightly less than the regional average of 1,600 hours. Most of the rainfall in the south-west is caused by Atlantic depressions or by convection. Most of the rainfall in autumn and winter is caused by the Atlantic depressions, which are most active during those seasons. In summer, a large proportion of the rainfall is caused by sun heating the ground leading to convection and to showers and thunderstorms. Average rainfall is around 700 mm (28 in). About 8–15 days of snowfall per year is typical. November to March have the highest mean wind speeds, and June to August have the lightest winds. The predominant wind direction is from the south-west.

== Demography ==
The parish has a population in 2011 of 5,093, with a mean age of 43 years. Residents lived in 2,209 households. The vast majority of households (2,183) gave their ethnic status at the 2001 census as white.

=== 2021 census ===
According to the most recent 2021 census, the village had a total population of 6,263 with 51.1% female and 48.9% male. Over 6,101 people or 97.3% identified as white, 1% (61) Asian, 0.3% (17) Black and 1.3% (79) as mixed.

The most common places of birth were: 94.1% or 5,900 born in the United Kingdom and 2.5% (156) born in the European Union, 81 Africa and 65 Middle East and Asia, 29 Americas and Caribbean.

== Economy ==
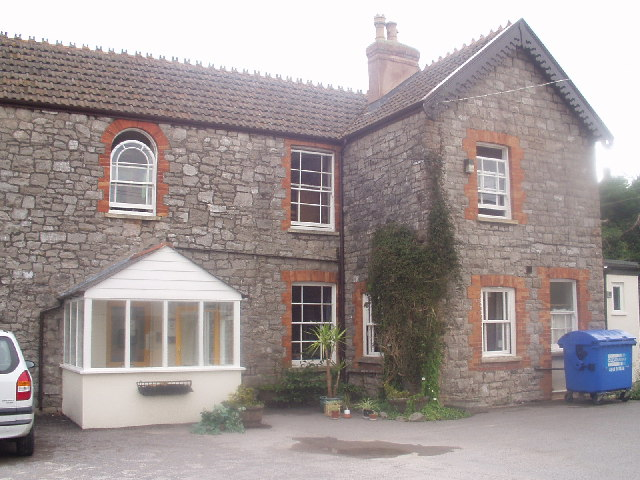
Cheddar Youth Hostel

The village gave its name to Cheddar cheese, which is the most popular type of cheese in the United Kingdom. The cheese is now made and consumed worldwide, and only one producer remains in the village.

Since the 1880s, Cheddar's other main produce has been the strawberry, which is grown on the south-facing lower slopes of the Mendip hills. As a consequence of its use for transporting strawberries to market, the since-closed Cheddar Valley line became known as The Strawberry Line after it opened in 1869. The line ran from Yatton to Wells. When the rest of the line was closed and all passenger services ceased, the section of the line between Cheddar and Yatton remained open for goods traffic. It provided a fast link with the main markets for the strawberries in Birmingham and London, but finally closed in 1964, becoming part of the Cheddar Valley Railway Nature Reserve.

Cheddar Ales is a small brewery based in the village, producing beer for local public houses.

Tourism is a significant source of employment. Around 15 percent of employment in Sedgemoor is provided by tourism, but within Cheddar it is estimated to employ as many as 1,000 people. The village also has a youth hostel, and a number of camping and caravan sites.

== Culture and community ==
Cheddar has a number of active service clubs including Cheddar Vale Lions Club, Mendip Rotary and Mendip Inner Wheel Club. The clubs raise money for projects in the local community and hold annual events such as a fireworks display, duck races in the Gorge, a dragon boat race on the reservoir and concerts on the grounds of the nearby St Michael's Cheshire Home.

Several notable people have been born or lived in Cheddar. Musician Jack Bessant, the bass guitarist with the band Reef grew up on his parents' strawberry farm, and Matt Goss and Luke Goss, former members of Bros, lived in Cheddar for nine months as children. Trina Gulliver, ten-time World Professional Darts Champion, previously lived in Cheddar until 2017. The comedian Richard Herring grew up in Cheddar. His 2008 Edinburgh Festival Fringe show, The Headmaster's Son is based on his time at The Kings of Wessex School, where his father Keith was the headmaster. The final performance of this show was held at the school in November 2009. He also visited the school in March 2010 to perform his show Hitler Moustache. In May 2013, a community radio station called Pulse was launched.

== Landmarks ==
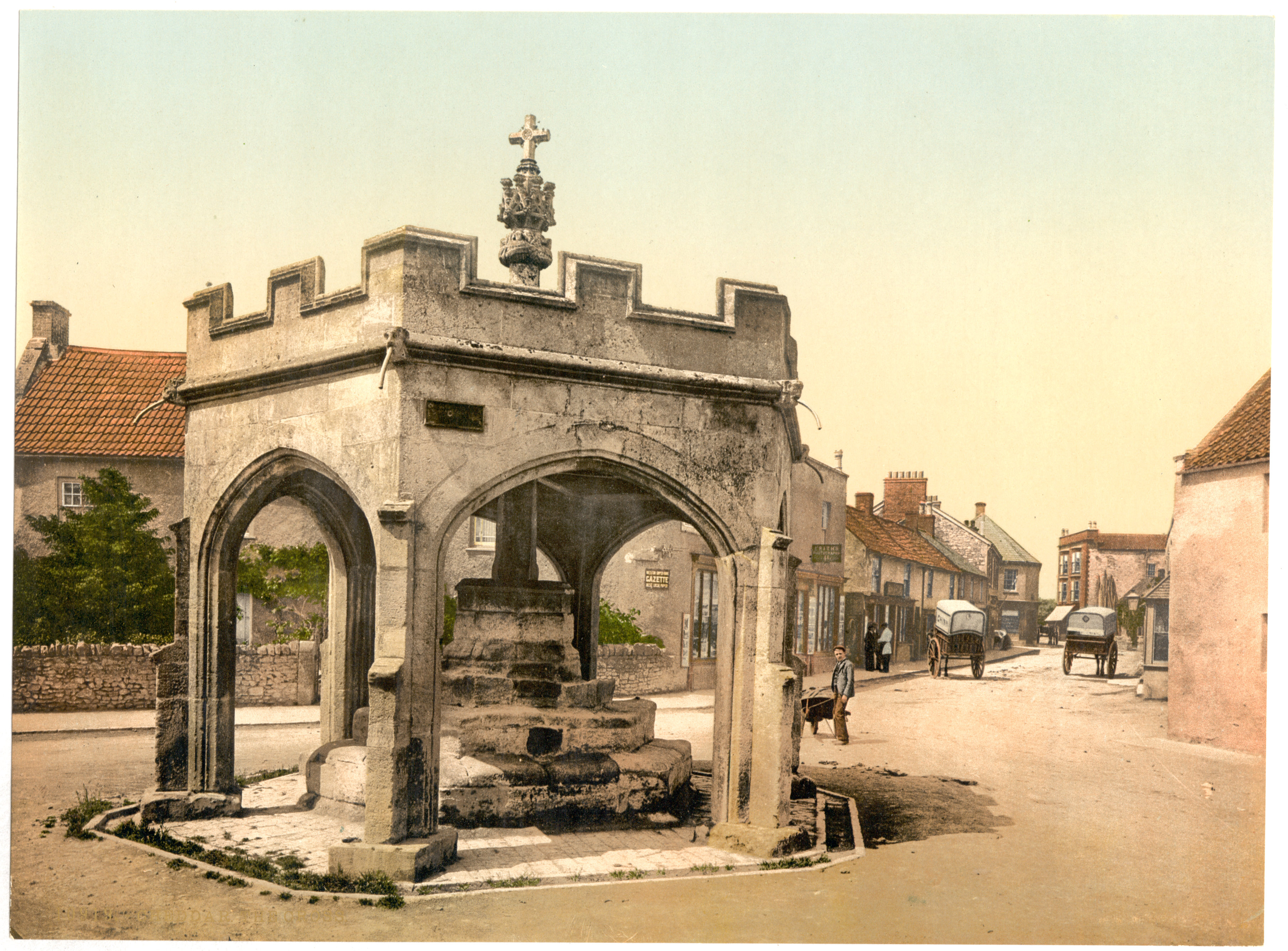
Photochrom of Cheddar Market Cross in the 1890s

The market cross in Bath Street dates from the 15th century, with the shelter having been rebuilt in 1834. It has a central octagonal pier, a socket raised on four steps, a hexagonal shelter with six arched four-centred openings, shallow two-stage buttresses at each angle, and an embattled parapet. The shaft is crowned by an abacus with figures in niches, probably from the late 19th century, although the cross is now missing. It was rebuilt by Thomas, Marquess of Bath. It is a scheduled monument (Somerset County No 21) and Grade II* listed building.

In January 2000, the cross was seriously damaged in a traffic accident. By 2002, the cross had been rebuilt and the area around it was redesigned to protect and enhance its appearance. The cross was badly damaged again in March 2012, when a taxi crashed into it late at night demolishing two sides. Repair work, which included the addition of wooden-clad steel posts to protect against future crashes, was completed in November 2012 at a cost of £60,000.

Hannah More, a philanthropist and educator, founded a school in the village in the late 18th century for the children of miners. Her first school was located in a 17th-century house. Now named "Hannah More's Cottage", the Grade II-listed building is used by the local community as a meeting place.

== Transport ==
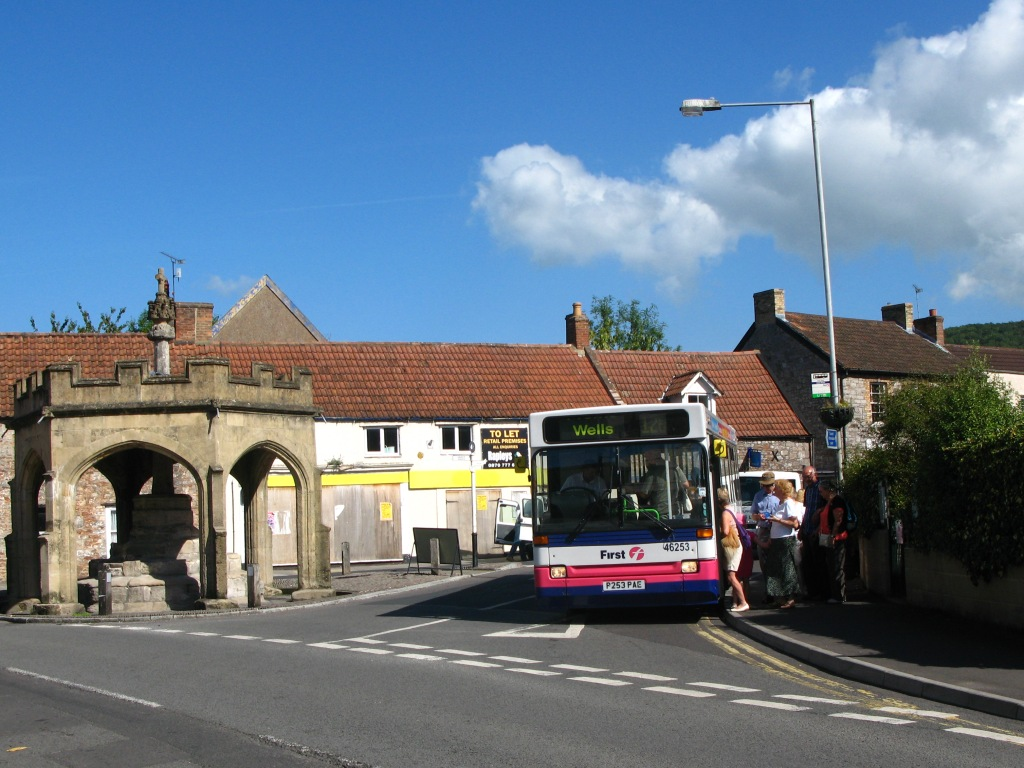
A First Somerset & Avon bus picks up passengers at the Market cross on service 126 from Weston-super-Mare to Wells, the principal bus service through Cheddar.

The village is situated on the A371 road which runs from Wincanton, to Weston-super-Mare. It is approximately 5 miles (8.0 km) from the route of the M5 motorway with around a 10 miles (16 km) drive to junction 22.

It was on the Cheddar Valley line, a railway line that was opened in 1869 and closed in 1963. It became known as The Strawberry Line because of the large volume of locally-grown strawberries that it carried. It ran from Yatton railway station through Cheddar to Wells (Tucker Street) railway station and joined the East Somerset Railway to make a through route via Shepton Mallet (High Street) railway station to Witham. Sections of the now-disused railway have been opened as the Strawberry Line Trail, which currently runs from Yatton to Cheddar. The Cheddar Valley line survived until the "Beeching Axe". Towards the end of its life there were so few passengers that diesel railcars were sometimes used. The Cheddar branch closed to passengers on 9 September 1963 and to goods in 1964. The line closed in the 1960s, when it became part of the Cheddar Valley Railway Nature Reserve, and part of the National Cycle Network route 26. The cycle route also intersects with the West Mendip Way and various other footpaths.

The principal bus route is the hourly service 126 between Weston-super-Mare and Wells operated by First West of England. Other bus routes include the service 668 from Shipham to Street which runs every couple of hours operated by Libra Travel, as well as the college bus service 66 which runs from Axbridge to the Bridgwater Campus of Bridgwater and Taunton College in the mornings and evenings of college term times, and is operated by Bakers Dolphin.

== Education ==
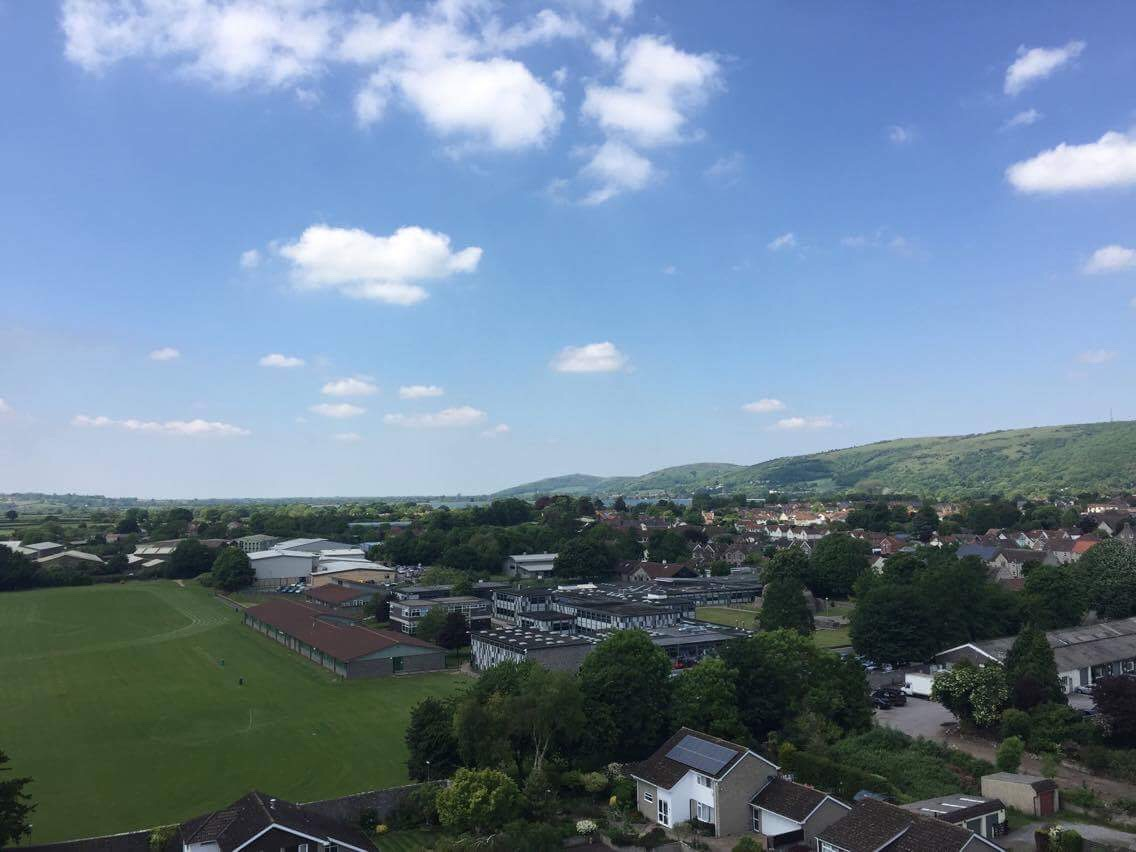
The Kings of Wessex Academy seen from the tower of St. Andrew's Church (looking north-west)

The first school in Cheddar was set up by Hannah More during the 18th Century, however now Cheddar has three schools belonging to the Cheddar Valley Group of Schools, twelve schools that provide Cheddar Valley's three-tier education system. Cheddar First School has ten classes for children between 4 and 9 years. Fairlands Middle School, a middle school categorised as a middle-deemed-secondary school, has 510 pupils between 9 and 13. Fairlands takes children moving up from Cheddar First School as well as other first schools in the Cheddar Valley. The Kings of Wessex Academy, a coeducational comprehensive school, has been rated as "good" by Ofsted. It has 1,176 students aged 13 to 18, including 333 in the sixth form. Kings is a faith school linked to the Church of England. It was awarded the specialist status of Technology College in 2001, enabling it to develop its Information Technology (IT) facilities and improve courses in science, mathematics and design technology. In 2007 it became a foundation school, giving it more control over its own finances. The academy owns and runs a sports centre and swimming pool, Kings Fitness & Leisure, with facilities that are used by students as well as residents. It has since November 2016 been a part of the Wessex Learning Trust which incorporates eight academies from the surrounding area.

== Religious sites ==
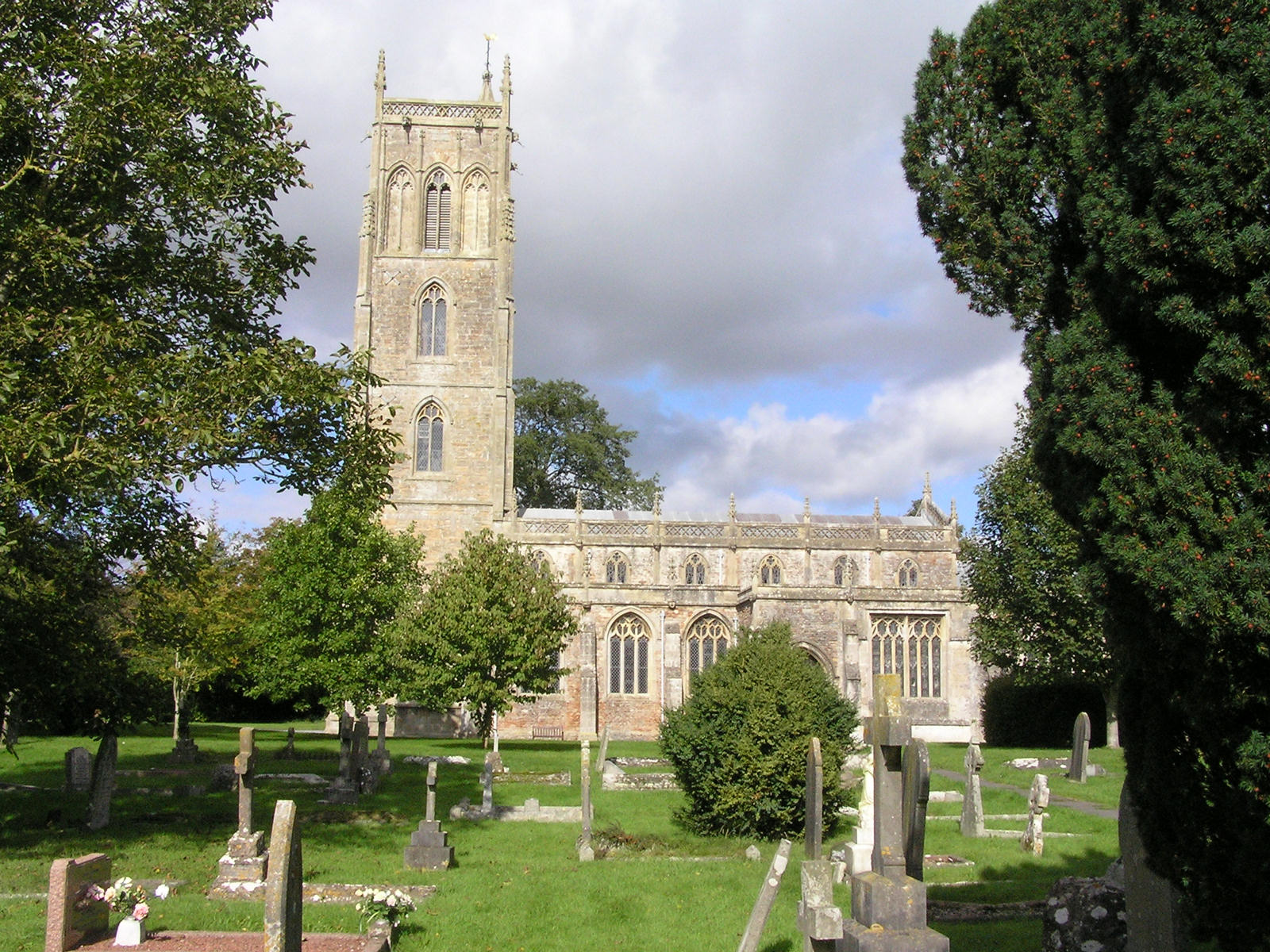
Church of St Andrew

The Church of St Andrew dates from the 14th century. It was restored in 1873 by William Butterfield. It is a Grade I listed building and contains some 15th-century stained glass and an altar table of 1631. The chest tomb in the chancel is believed to contain the remains of Sir Thomas Cheddar and is dated 1442. The tower, which rises to 100 feet (30 m), contains a bell dating from 1759 made by Thomas Bilbie of the Bilbie family. The graveyard contains the grave of the hymn writer William Chatterton Dix.

There are also churches for Roman Catholic, Methodist and other denominations, including Cheddar Valley Community Church, who not only meet at the Kings of Wessex School on Sunday, but also have their own site on Tweentown for meeting during the week. The Baptist chapel was built in 1831.

== Sport ==
Kings Fitness & Leisure, situated on the grounds of the Kings of Wessex School, provides a venue for various sports and includes a 20-metre swimming pool, racket sport courts, a sports hall, dance studios and a gym. A youth sports festival was held on Sharpham Road Playing Fields in 2009. In 2010 a skatepark was built in the village, funded by the Cheddar Local Action Team.

Cheddar A.F.C., founded in 1892 and nicknamed "The Cheesemen", play in the Western Football League Division One. In 2009 plans were revealed to move the club from its present home at Bowdens Park on Draycott Road to a new larger site.

Cheddar Cricket Club was formed in the late 19th century and moved to Sharpham Road Playing Fields in 1964. They now play in the West of England Premier League Somerset Division. Cheddar Rugby Club, who own part of the Sharpham playing fields, was formed in 1836. The club organises an annual Cheddar Rugby Tournament. Cheddar Lawn Tennis Club, was formed in 1924, and play in the North Somerset League and also has social tennis and coaching. Cheddar Running Club organised an annual half marathon until 2009.

The village is both on the route of the West Mendip Way and Samaritans Way South West.
