= Batts Combe quarry =

Limestone quarry in Somerset, England

Coordinates: 51.292°N 2.778°W

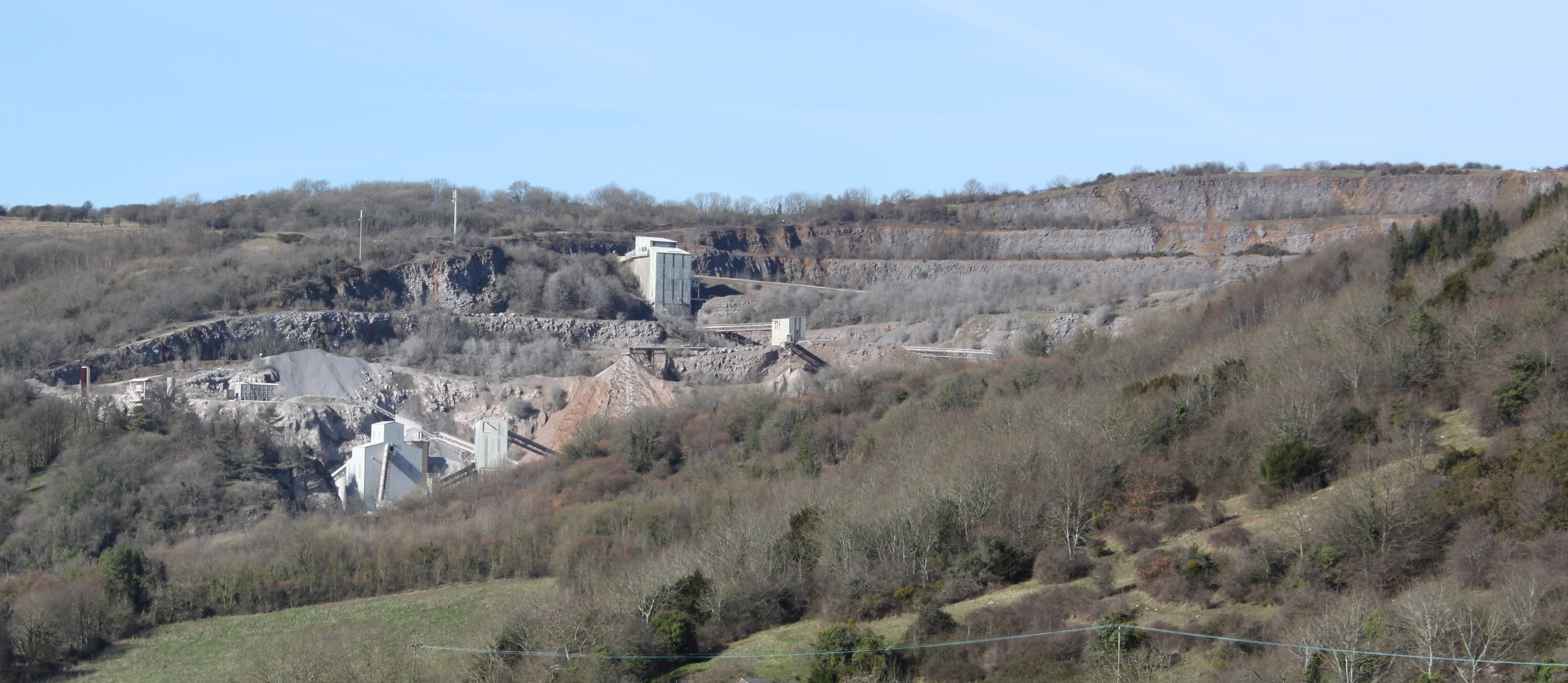
Batts Combe Quarry from the lookout tower above Cheddar Gorge

Batts Combe quarry, grid reference ST460550 is a limestone quarry on the edge of Cheddar village on the Mendip Hills, Somerset, England.

It has been operating since the early 20th century and is currently owned and operated by Heidelberg. The output in 2005 was around 4,000 tonnes of limestone per day, one third of which was supplied to an on-site lime kiln (now closed and dismantled), the remainder being sold as coated or dusted aggregates. The limestone at this site is close to 99% carbonate of calcium and magnesium (dolomite). In former years it was a major supplier of limestone for railway track ballast purposes.

A lime-burning kiln at the site was closed for a while in 2006. The kiln, which produced 200,000 tonnes of quicklime a year for use in the steel industry, required £300,000 of investment to resolve the problems. The closure followed an earlier warning from the Environment Agency when the company was notified that it should tighten up procedures at the site. Quicklime dust is a health hazard, which in large quantities can cause skin irritation and damage to the eyes and throat. In March 2009 however the lime kiln closed, supposedly indefinitely, following a drop in demand from the site's sole customer, Corus.; the quarry has since been taken over by Melton Ross, Lincolnshire-based Singleton Birch.

There is some evidence of a Bronze Age field system at the site. Boxes were placed in Hanson woodland adjoining the company's Batts Combe quarry to encourage dormice to breed, and monitored with the help of pupils from Wells Cathedral School.

== See also ==
- Quarries of the Mendip Hills
