= Ham Green Pottery =

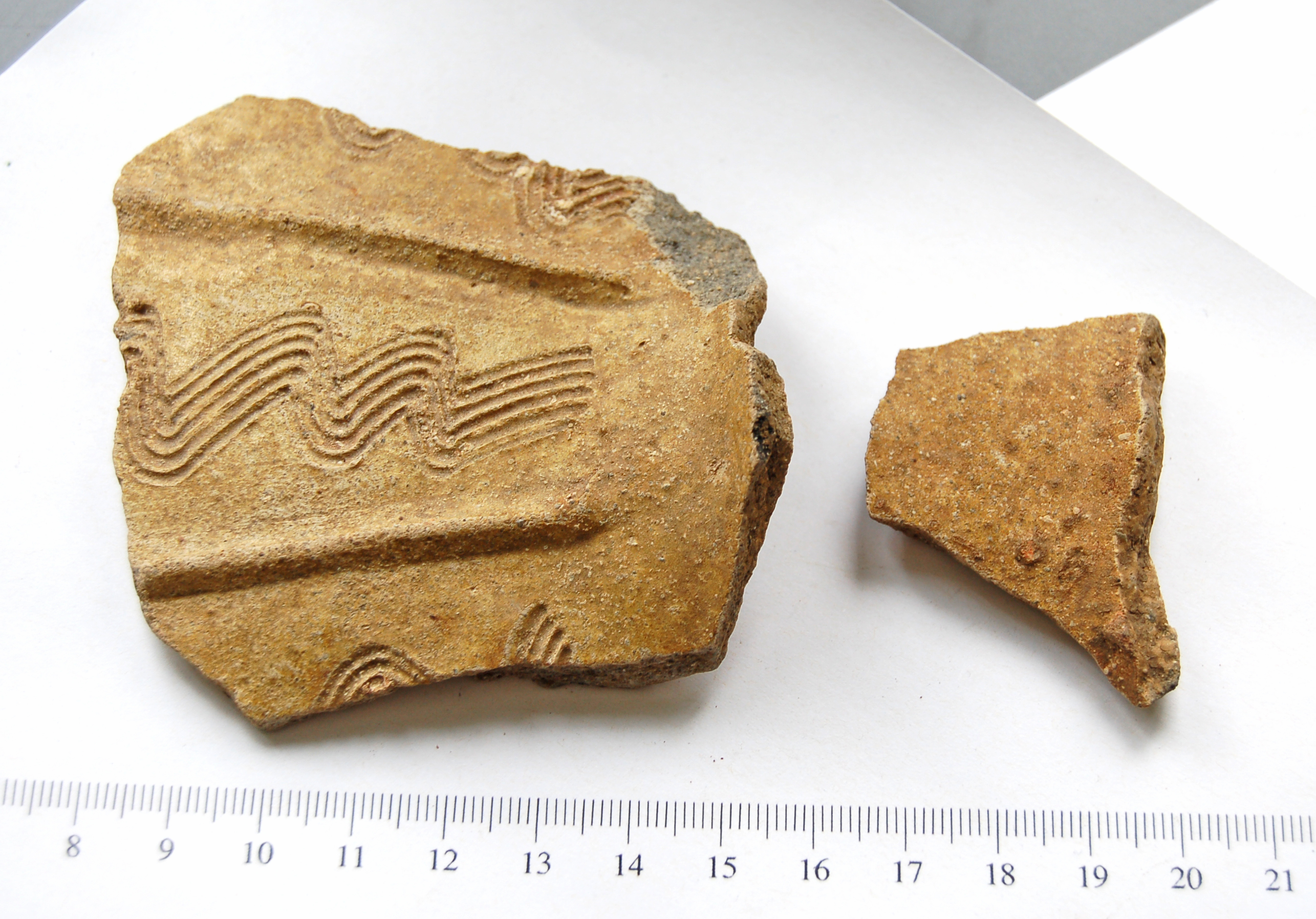
Two sherds, found in Somerset

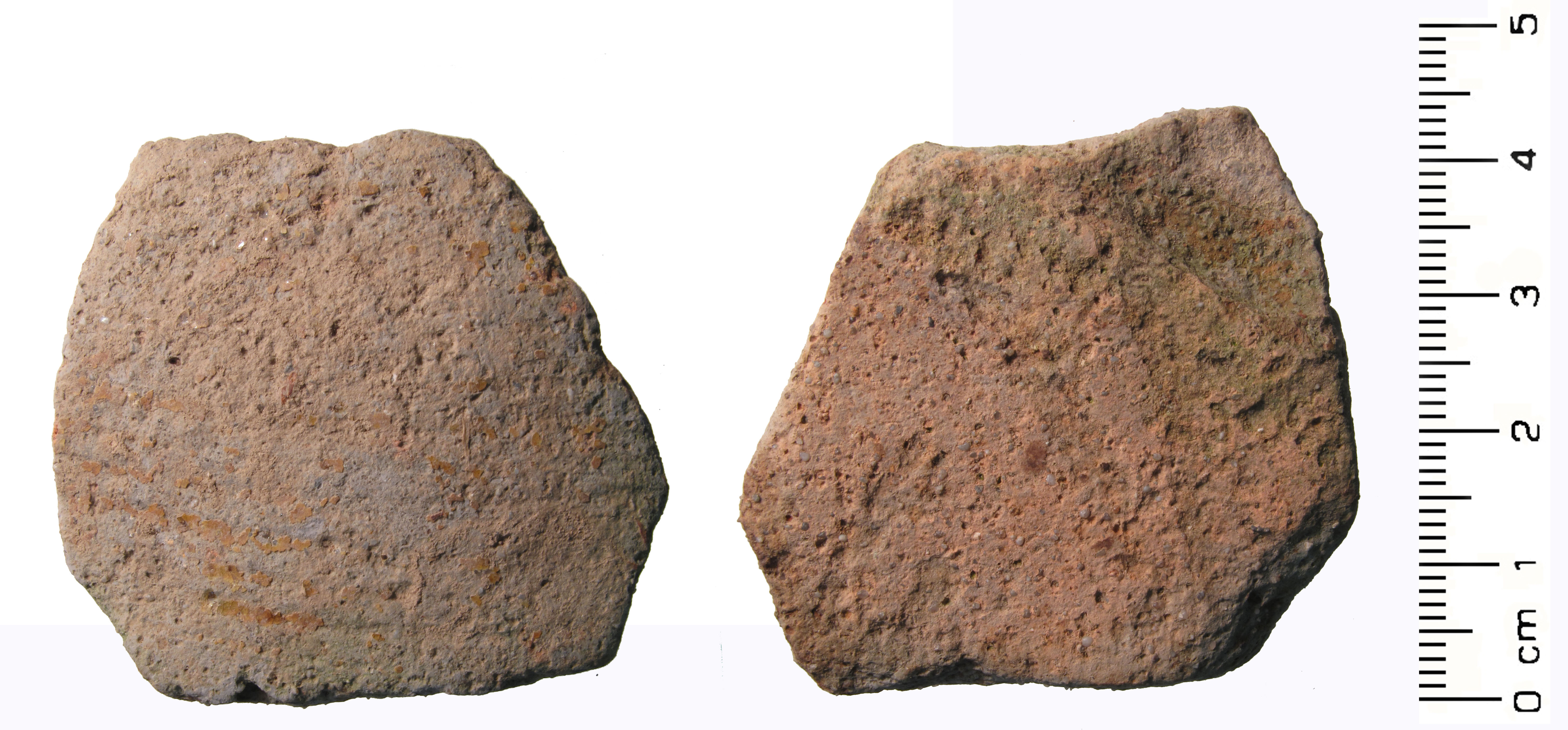
Sherd from a ?jug, "possibly" late Ham Green.

Ham Green Pottery was produced between 1100 AD to 1250 AD at a hamlet above the village of Pill called Ham Green in the English county of Somerset.

== History ==
The kiln was built of limestone lined with clay. It was 8 feet (2.4 m) long and 4 feet (1.2 m) wide and fired the clay which was thrown by hand. Two types of jugs have been identified. Type A, believed to date from the 12th century have a yellow splashed plain lead glaze and have a diamond pattern decorating the rim. Type B, a more recent product appears greener, due to the presence of copper in the glaze. The jugs were decorated with floral patterns sometimes with identifiable animals or human figures.

Dendrochronology suggests that production had ceased by 1275.

The site was excavated in 1959, when 6,915 fragments of pottery were uncovered, mainly decorated pieces of jugs and cooking pots. Further excavation took place in 1978.

== Trade ==
Pottery was exported via a port near the mouth of the River Avon at Pill all over Britain, in particular to South West England, South Wales and Ireland. This led to the name Crockerne Pill which means literally 'pottery wharf'.

== Artefacts ==
'Ham Green' pottery has been found and identified in archaeological digs. It is an important archaeological 'dating tool' as the period of manufacture is so precise. Fragments found in excavations at Cheddar Palace were dated to 1200-1220.

Bristol City Museum has a selection of pottery artifacts from this site and other locations which exhibit the decoration style and form of Ham Green pottery. The only item on display is a large jug at the M Shed.
