= Cheddar Palace =

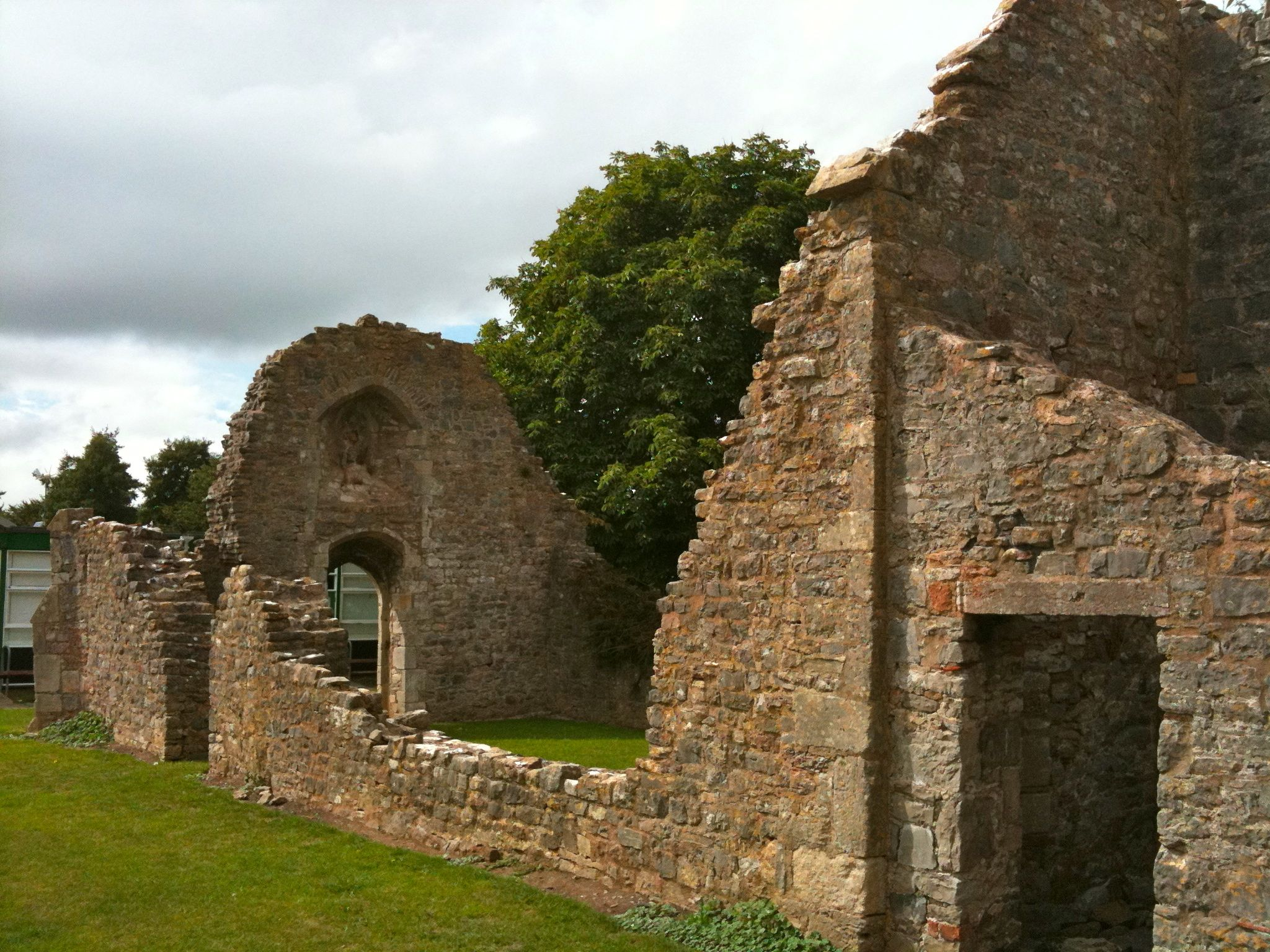
- The ruined St Columbanus Chapel

- Location within Somerset
- 51°16′29″N 2°46′44″W
- Location: Cheddar, Somerset, England

Scheduled monument
- Official name: Roman settlement site, Anglo-Saxon and Norman royal palace, and St Columbanus' Chapel
- Designated: 16 December 1999
- Reference no.: 1017290

Listed Building – Grade II
- Official name: Former chapel dedicated to St Columbanus
- Designated: 29 January 1985
- Reference no.: 1173737

The Cheddar Palace was established in the 9th century, in Cheddar, Somerset, England. It was a royal hunting lodge in the Anglo-Saxon and medieval periods and hosted the Witenagemot in the 10th century.

Nearby are the ruins of the 14th-century St Columbanus Chapel. Roman artifacts and a burial have also been discovered. The site of the palace is now marked by concrete slabs within the grounds of The Kings of Wessex Academy.

== History ==
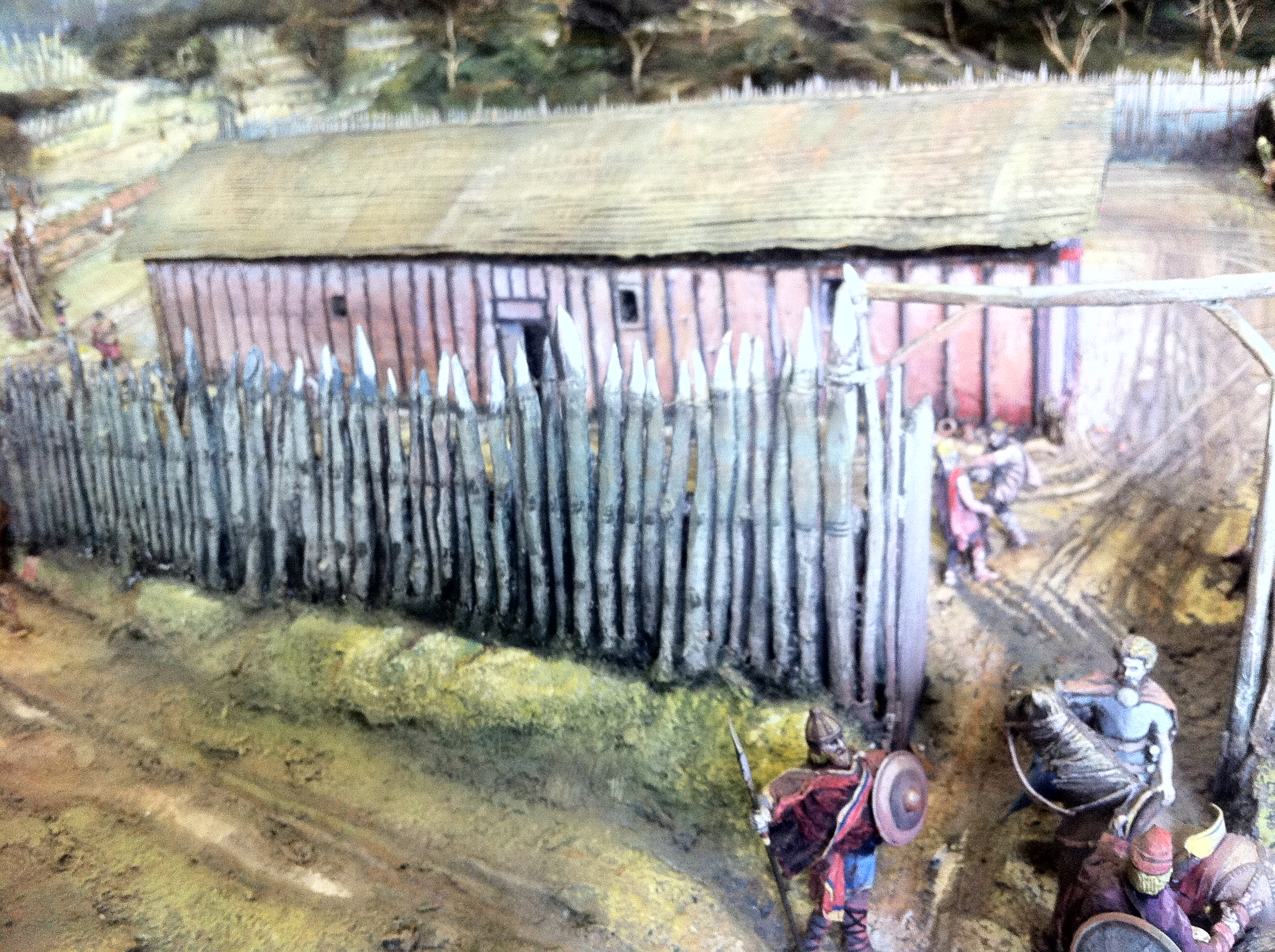
Reconstruction of the Saxon palace at Cheddar

A wooden "great hall" was constructed around the reign of King Alfred the Great (died 899 AD) and the "community at Cheddar" received a special mention in his will. At this time the building served as a minster. It was rebuilt around 930 and a chapel and other buildings were added, becoming a royal hunting lodge.

During the Anglo-Saxon period, it was used on three occasions in the 10th century to host the Witenagemot, an assembly of powerful figures, in 941, 956 and 968, probably for Æthelstan and Edgar the Peaceful. There is documentary evidence that Henry I visited the palace in 1121 and 1130 and Henry II in 1158. Several expansions of the site took place between the Anglo-Saxon and medieval eras.

Fragments of Ham Green Pottery found at the site were dated to 1200-1220.

In 1230 the site was given to the Dean and Chapter of Wells Cathedral. In 1548, when William Barlow was the Bishop of Bath and Wells, it was sold to Edward VI.

The remains were excavated during the construction of the school, but have since been re-buried. The layout is marked with concrete plinths.

== St Columbanus Chapel ==
Next to the site are ruins of a 14th-century chapel dedicated to St. Columbanus. It stands on a site originally built on in the 10th century and enlarged in the 11th. In the 17th century it became a private dwelling that survived until 1910.

The building was octagonal in plan. End walls remain standing and are supported by diagonal corner buttresses; however the north and south walls are now only approximately 1 metre (3 ft 3 in) high.

== Roman remains ==
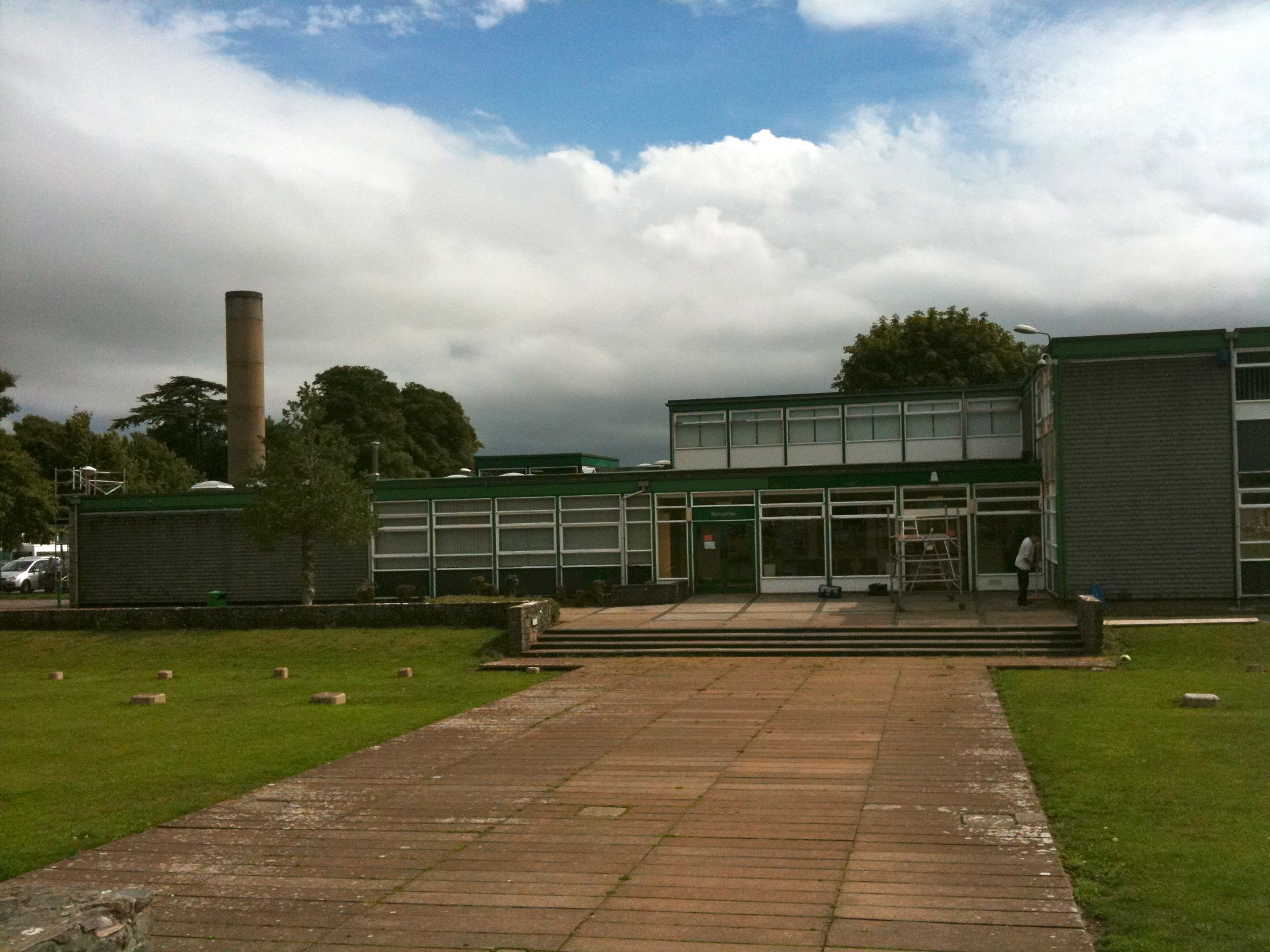
Concrete plinths in front of The Kings of Wessex Academy mark out the location of the Saxon palace

In January 2006, during the building of a new languages block at the school, a grave, believed to be Roman, was uncovered. The grave contained the skeleton of a man, believed to be around 50 years old and pagan rather than Christian due to the north-south orientation of the grave.

Various Roman artifacts, including wall plaster and tesserae, dating from the 1st to the 4th centuries have also been found. It has been suggested that this may be linked with the settlement of Iscalis, whose location is unknown.
