= Cheddar Ales =

English brewery

Coordinates: 51°16′02″N 2°46′08″W

- Location: Cheddar, Somerset, England
- Opened: 2006
- Owned by: Independent
- Website: cheddarales.co.uk

Active beers
Name	Type
Gorge Best	Bitter
Potholer	Pale Ale
Totty Pot Porter	Porter
Goat's Leap	IPA
Bitter Bully	Pale Ale
Hardrock	Pale Ale
Crown and Glory	Amber Ale

Seasonal beers
Name	Type
Festive Totty	Porter
Wild Thing	Pale Ale
Seismic Shift	Pale Ale
Isolator 7	IPA
Bedstraw	Kolsch
Karst	Rye Beer
Yakima Pils	Pilsner

Cheddar Ales is an independent, artisanal brewery located in the village of Cheddar in Somerset, England, which produces a range of regular and seasonal beers. Its owner and head brewer, Jem Ham, previously worked 15 years at another local brewery before going out on his own.

== Products ==
The brewery produces seven regular beers and the occasional seasonal brew.

- Gorge Best Bitter – 4.0% abv.
- Potholer – 4.3% abv golden bitter. The name is derived from the sport of potholing (cave exploration), which is popular in the Caves of the Mendip Hills.
- Totty Pot Porter – 4.5% abv porter, first produced in December 2007. Named after a small cave at the top of Cheddar Gorge.
- Goat's Leap – 5.5% abv India Pale Ale (IPA). Named after a point on the Kaveri River near Bangalore in India.
- Hardrock – 4.4% abv Pale Ale.
- Bitter Bully – 3.8% abv Pale Ale.
- Crown and Glory – 4.6% abv.

== Awards ==
In 2007, Potholer won a silver medal at the Society of Independent Brewers annual Maltings Beer Festival. In 2009, Totty Pot Porter won Bronze Medal in the Champion Bottled Beers at the SIBA National Beer Competition, and a gold award at the International Beer Challenge, where it won best bottled beer.

== Community ==
The brewery holds occasional beer festivals featuring both its own and guest beers, plus live music and in 2020 opened a full time tap room and pizza oven.
