= Tower testing station =

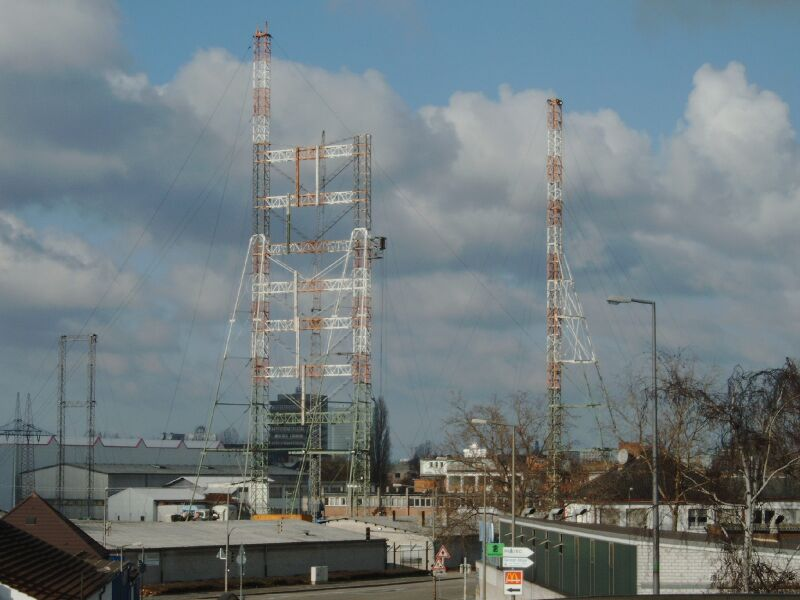
Tower testing station

A tower testing station is a special plant for testing various design for towers for transmission lines and similar uses. A tower testing station consists of two steel stands and one or more foundations, on which a sample of the tower can be built. The number of test conditions is normally limited to between six and eight individual cases, with loading condition such as reduced wind and ice. The towers to be tested are erected on rigid foundation and the wire ropes attached to the loading point required. Loading may either be applied by 'dead' weights using scale pans, winches or hydraulic rams. In the latter cases a load cell or dynamometer is placed in the rigging adjacent to the point of loading at the structure. The loading methods induce strain by pulling cables away from the tower to the specified loads. The pulling load is indicated through a strain gauge placed on the pulling point. Loading points on a tower naturally encompasses longitudinal, transverse and vertical components, either as individual or a combined resultant load.

The degree of sophistication of the control equipment for the application and recording of the load varies considerably at individual test stations. From individual load point application of individual load components with corresponding dial gauges to electronic equipment capable of applying all the loads with constant data recording facilities.

The test set up is made to conform to the design specifications and verify the adequacy of the main components of the structure and their connections to withstand the static design loads specified for that particular structure as an individual entity under controlled conditions. It furnishes insight into actual stress distribution of unique configurations, fit-up verification, performance of the structure in a deflected position and other benefits.

== Locations of tower testing stations ==
- Chungju, South Korea, BOSUNG POWERTEC CO., LTD.,
- Moscow, Russia, ORGRES,
- Mannheim, Germany, ABB
- Livorno, Italy, Tower Test srl
- Seville, Spain, Eucomsa
- Toronto, Ontario, Canada, Kinectrics
- Vashi, Jaipur, Jabalpur, India,
- Bucharest, Romania,
- Liangxiang, China,
- Butibori, Nagpur, India,
- Betim, Minas Gerais, Brazil,
- Kanchipuram, Chennai, India, Larsen & Toubro
- IRAN, NRI (Niroo Research Institute),
- Riyadh, Saudi Arabia, Al-Babtain Tower Testing Station
- Linhares, Espírito Santo, Brazil, Brametal Test Station
