= Royal London Asset Management =

UK-based investment management company

- Company type: Subsidiary
- Industry: Investment management
- Founded: 1988; 38 years ago
- Headquarters: London, United Kingdom
- Key people: Hans Georgeson (CEO)
- Products: Fixed income, Equity, Cash, Multi Asset, Property, Sustainable Investing
- AUM: £ 170.3 billion as at 30 September 2024, subject to rounding
- Parent: Royal London Group
- Website: www.rlam.com

Royal London Asset Management (RLAM) is a UK-based investment management company. RLAM invests across a broad range of core asset classes including fixed income, equities, multi asset, cash and property. It also offers funds that adopt an ethical or sustainable approach.

== Overview ==
RLAM is a wholly owned, autonomous subsidiary of the Royal London Group. As well as managing Group assets, it provides active investment management services to clients including pension schemes, local authorities, insurance companies, charities, endowments, universities, wealth managers and other financial intermediaries. RLAM offers investment in its funds through both pooled vehicles and segregated accounts.

== History ==
Royal London Asset Management (RLAM) was established in 1988 as a subsidiary of the Royal London Group. The Group consists of the Royal London Mutual Insurance Society Limited (RLMIS) and its subsidiaries, and is the UK's largest mutual insurance company. RLAM won its first external client in 1990 and continued to attract new business through the 1990s. The next decade was a period of more rapid growth, with the acquisitions of the United Assurance Group in 2000, Scottish Life and the cash management business of Union Discount (subsequently renamed Royal London Cash Management) in 2004. Further expansion followed in 2013 with the acquisition of The Co-operative Asset Management (TCAM), enabling RLAM to benefit from its strength in sustainable investing.

== Origins of logo ==
One of the core elements of the Royal London Asset Management visual identity is the pelican logo. Named ‘Gilbert’ the RLAM pelican takes its origins as a heraldic symbol of generosity as well as the renowned regal heritage of pelicans.
