= Scottish Widows Investment Partnership =

- Company type: Ltd.
- Industry: Investment management
- Founded: 2000; 26 years ago
- Defunct: 2014
- Fate: Merged with parent
- Headquarters: Edinburgh, Scotland, UK
- Number of employees: 490
- Parent: Aberdeen Asset Management

Scottish Widows Investment Partnership (SWIP) was an asset management company based in Edinburgh, Scotland. It was one of Europe's largest asset management companies, with £146 billion of funds under management as at 31 December 2013. These funds were invested across all major asset classes – including worldwide equities, property, bonds, multi-asset, multi-manager and cash.

== History ==
Scottish Widows Investment Partnership was created in 2000 following the merger of two well-established asset management companies, Scottish Widows Investment Management and Hill Samuel Asset Management. SWIP came into being under the leadership of Orie Dudley who resigned later that year to move to Northern Trust. He was replaced by Bill Main, formerly Deputy Chief Executive at Scottish Widows. After Bill Main retired in 2003, Chris Phillips became CEO at SWIP until he announced his intention to move to Morley Fund Management in 2007. Dean Buckley, joined SWIP as Managing Director in January 2008 following 12 years with HSBC Investments.

On 1 April 2014, Aberdeen Asset Management PLC announced the completion of their acquisition of SWIP from Lloyds Banking Group in an RNS to the London Stock Exchange. Mr Buckley left SWIP on completion of the acquisition. The company used the trademarks "SWIP" and "Scottish Widows" under temporary licence from Lloyds Banking Group until late 2014, when it merged with its parent.

== Operations ==
SWIP promoted a range of mutual funds through financial advisers and investment platforms. SWIP also managed a diverse range of specialist funds for a range of institutional clients, including large pensions, charities and local government in the UK, Europe and the US. In addition, Scottish Widows Investment Partnership managed life assurance, pension and investment funds for Scottish Widows which was part of its largest single client, Lloyds Banking Group.

SWIP employed around 500 staff including more than 150 investment professionals.

== See also ==
- Scottish Widows
