= The Kings of Wessex Academy =

Location
- Station Road; Cheddar, Somerset, BS27 3AQ; England; 51°16′30″N 2°46′43″W

Information
- Type: Comprehensive; Academy
- Motto: Believe and succeed
- Religious affiliation: Church of England
- Established: 1976
- Trust: Wessex Learning Trust
- Specialist: Technology College
- Department for Education URN: 136783 Tables
- Ofsted: Reports
- Head teacher: Dave Wiltshire
- Age: 13 to 18
- Enrolment: 1,176 in 2015
- Houses: Avalon, Tintagel, Camelot, Lyoness
- Website: http://www.kowessex.co.uk

The Kings of Wessex Academy, formerly known as the Kings of Wessex School, is a co-educational comprehensive secondary school in Cheddar, Somerset, England. In 2015, it had 1,176 pupils aged 13 to 18, of both sexes and all ability levels including 333 in the sixth form. In November 2016, the academy became part of the Wessex Learning Trust which incorporated eight academies from the surrounding area. Kings is a Church of England school.

In the school's most recent Ofsted inspection in 2018, it was rated as "good".

In 2001, the academy was awarded the specialist status of Technology College, enabling it to develop its information technology facilities and improve courses in science, mathematics and design technology. In 2011, the school became an academy.

The school has achieved accreditation from Investors in People. It has also received a Sportsmark award, as well as two Artsmark awards in the 2001–2002 and 2004–2005 academic years.

The school also runs a leisure centre, Kings Fitness & Leisure, which has a swimming pool and sports facilities which are used by its students and the pupils of other schools in the surrounding area, as well as being open to members of the public. The school grounds contain the ruins of an ancient Saxon palace and chapel.

== Academic performance ==
The school's Key Stage 3 scores for 2005 were an aggregate percentage score of 250, compared with 225 for schools in Somerset and 217 for schools in England. At GCSE level 73% of pupils achieved five or more A* to C grade passes, compared with 56% in Somerset and the rest of England.

In 2006 the measure of GCSE performance was changed to five or more A* to C grade passes including Mathematics and English. Using this new stricter measure the school scored 64% compared with 44.4% in Somerset and 45.8% in England.

In 2009. 81% of pupils at the school gained five or more A* to C passes, and 70% gained five A* to C passes including Maths and English, making it the top performing school in Somerset. In 2010 82% of pupils gained five or more A* to C passes, and 70% gained five A* to C passes including Maths and English. In 2011, the number of pupils gaining five or more A* to C passes increased 9% to 91%, and also increased 4% to 74% for those gaining five A* to C passes including Maths and English.

Since 2001, the school's GCSE results have been consistently higher than both the local authority and English averages. In 2014, they were sixth best of 83 schools in Somerset.

Percentage of pupils gaining 5 or more GCSE passes at grades A* to C
	2001	2002	2003	2004	2005	2006	2007	2008	2009	2010	2011	2012	2013	2014	2015
School	67%	69%	66%	71%	73%	76%	70%	68%	81%	82%	91%	91%	93%	88%	87%
Local authority	55%	55%	55%	56%	56%	56%	56%	60%							63%
National*	50%	52%	53%	54%	56.8%	59.0%	61.4%	65.3%	70.0%	75.3%	79.6%	81.9%	81.8%	75.8%	
Reference															

Percentage of pupils gaining 5 or more GCSE passes at grades A* to C (including English and Mathematics)
	2003	2004	2005	2006	2007	2008	2009	2010	2011	2012	2013	2014	2015	2016	2017
School	53%	61%	65%	63%	60%	52%	70%	70%	74%	65%	69%	72%	69%	76%	75%
Local authority	42%	44%	46%	44%	47%	47%	49%	54%	57%	56.5%	58.0%	53.9%	57.7%		
National*	42%	43%	44.7%	45.6%	46.3%	47.6%	49.8%	53.4%	59.0%	59.4%	59.2%	56.8%			
Reference															

- National results from 2005 are for pupils at the end of Key Stage 4, in England, including at non-state funded schools.

=== Inspections ===
In March 2015, Ofsted rated the school as "Good". The report said, "The most able students perform well and achieve the highest grades in a range of subjects," and "Teachers have good subject knowledge and are enthusiastic about passing on their expertise." However, the inspection concluded, "Teachers do not always check on students' learning in lessons closely enough. Consequently, some students, particularly the less able, are either not challenged enough or do not receive the help they need to succeed."

In February 2010, Ofsted rated the school as grade 1: outstanding. The report called the school "amazing" and praised the head, staff and governors for producing students of "world class" quality. Its chief recommendation for improvement was the raising of teaching standards, by increasing the proportion of lessons rated outstanding from their current good rating.

In March 2010, the school was subjected to a Statutory Inspection of Anglican Schools (SIAS) on behalf of the Diocese of Bath and Wells, a regular inspection done for all church schools according to a framework set by the National Society for Promoting Religious Education. The SIAS inspector summarised that "The distinctiveness and effectiveness of the Kings of Wessex School as a church school are outstanding."

The school's April 2007 Ofsted report concluded that the school "provides a good standard of education and has some outstanding features. As one parent rightly commented, 'It is a school of which to be proud'". Furthermore, it said, "There is a shared commitment on the part of leaders, staff and governors to raising achievement. This is an inclusive school with a number of key strengths. The school’s work in partnership with others to promote learners' well-being is excellent. The students' enjoyment of school is outstanding. The specialist provision for students with learning difficulties and disabilities is excellent." It did highlight some areas where the school could improve, most notably the lower achievements of boys compared with girls, and the need to promote independent learning within the classroom and outside of school. The report acknowledged that the school had made well targeted improvements since its 2002 inspection, but pointed out that "Development plans are not clear enough about how actions will be evaluated, particularly their effect on pupils' achievement".

A previous Ofsted report from 2002 stated that the Kings of Wessex was a "good school with a very good sixth form" and that it enabled its students to do well in examinations and tests. It described the school as a "friendly, harmonious community" and praised the way students took responsibility for their own learning. Its criticisms included the complaints that religious education was not adequate for older students, and that not all students could take part in daily collective worship.

== History ==
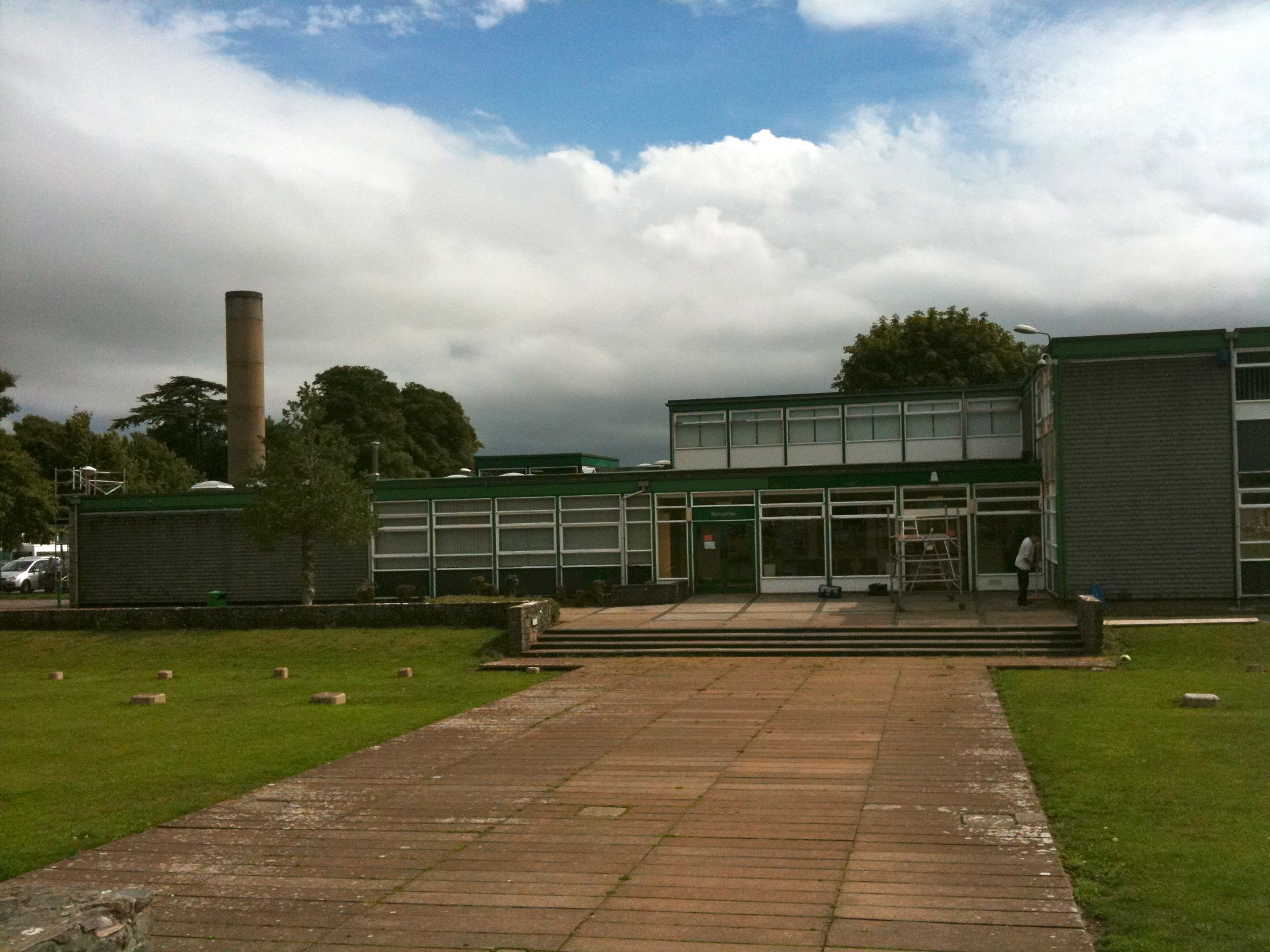
Concrete plinths in front of the school mark out the location of the Saxon palace.

The academy has had five headteachers (known as "executive headteachers" since the academy became part of the multi-academy trust). Chris Richardson, retired in July 2017 after nearly 23 years in the position. The role was taken over by Gavin Ball, former principal of Frome College.

Ball then became chief executive of the Wessex Learning Trust and Dave Wiltshire was appointed as headteacher.

Name	Years in office	Motto
Harry Broome	1964–1975	—N/a
Keith Herring	1975–1994	Getting the best out of everyone
Chris Richardson	1995–2017	Getting the best out of everyone
Gavin Ball	2017–2020	Believe and succeed
Dave Wiltshire	2020–	Believe and succeed

=== Historic links ===
The school is located within a conservation area and all building work is supervised in case excavations reveal any significant archaeological finds. The grounds contain the remains of the Saxon Cheddar Palace. In 1963, the discovery of the Saxon Palace delayed the school building programme for one year whilst the Archaeologists began their work.

A wooden "great hall" was constructed around the reign of King Alfred the Great (died 899AD). It was rebuilt around 930 AD and a chapel and other buildings were added. The palace hosted the Witenagemot, an assembly of powerful figures, in AD 941, 956 and 968. The remains were excavated during the construction of the school, but have since been re-buried. The layout is marked with concrete plinths. A ruined 14th century chapel in the grounds is dedicated to St. Columbanus.

In January 2006, during the building of a new languages block at the school a grave, believed to be Roman, was uncovered. The grave contained the skeleton of a man, believed to be around 50 years old and pagan rather than Christian due to the north–south orientation of the grave.

At least one member of staff has been found to have genetic links to Stone Age inhabitants of the area.

Scientists compared DNA taken from a 9,000-year-old skeleton known as "Cheddar Man" with that of fifteen school pupils and five adults from Cheddar village. A match was found, appropriately enough with the school's history teacher, Adrian Targett. This is claimed to be the longest human lineage ever to be traced, and supports the theory that the Britons were descended from ancient hunter-gatherers who later turned to agriculture, rather than a from more recent wave of immigrant farmers.

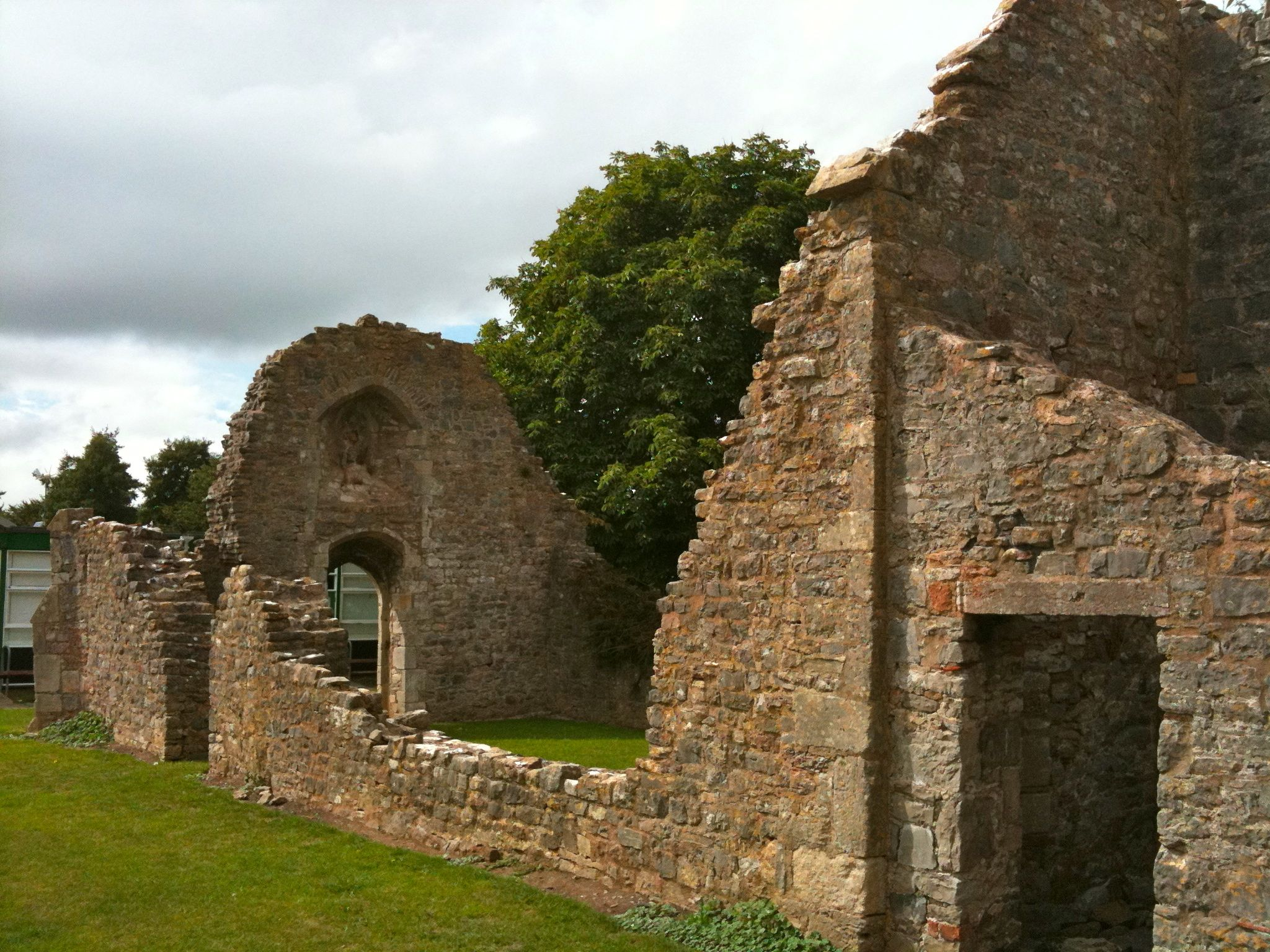
The ruined chapel is a Grade II listed building.

=== Technology College status ===
Being in a rural area with few large local manufacturers, the school had some difficulty in raising the £54,000 of sponsorship necessary to gain Technology College status, but many small donations from local employers and charities enabled it to reach the target. The headmaster claimed that the process of soliciting funds helped the school to refine its focus and gave local businesses more of a stake in the school. He also stressed that the new status of Technology College would not lead to any reduction of its strength in the arts.

In 2006, the school governors voted for foundation status. Foundation status has not changed the school's Christian ethos.

In May 2010, as a school judged as outstanding under the updated Ofsted inspection regime, the new Secretary of State for Education invited the school to become a new style Academy – a state-funded school that is independent of the local authority. The school's governing body voted in favour of a move to Academy status in June 2010.

The academy conversion was delayed due to the actions of the Church of England and the Diocesan Board of Education, which also prevented any church schools in England from becoming academies. The school became an academy on 1 June 2011.

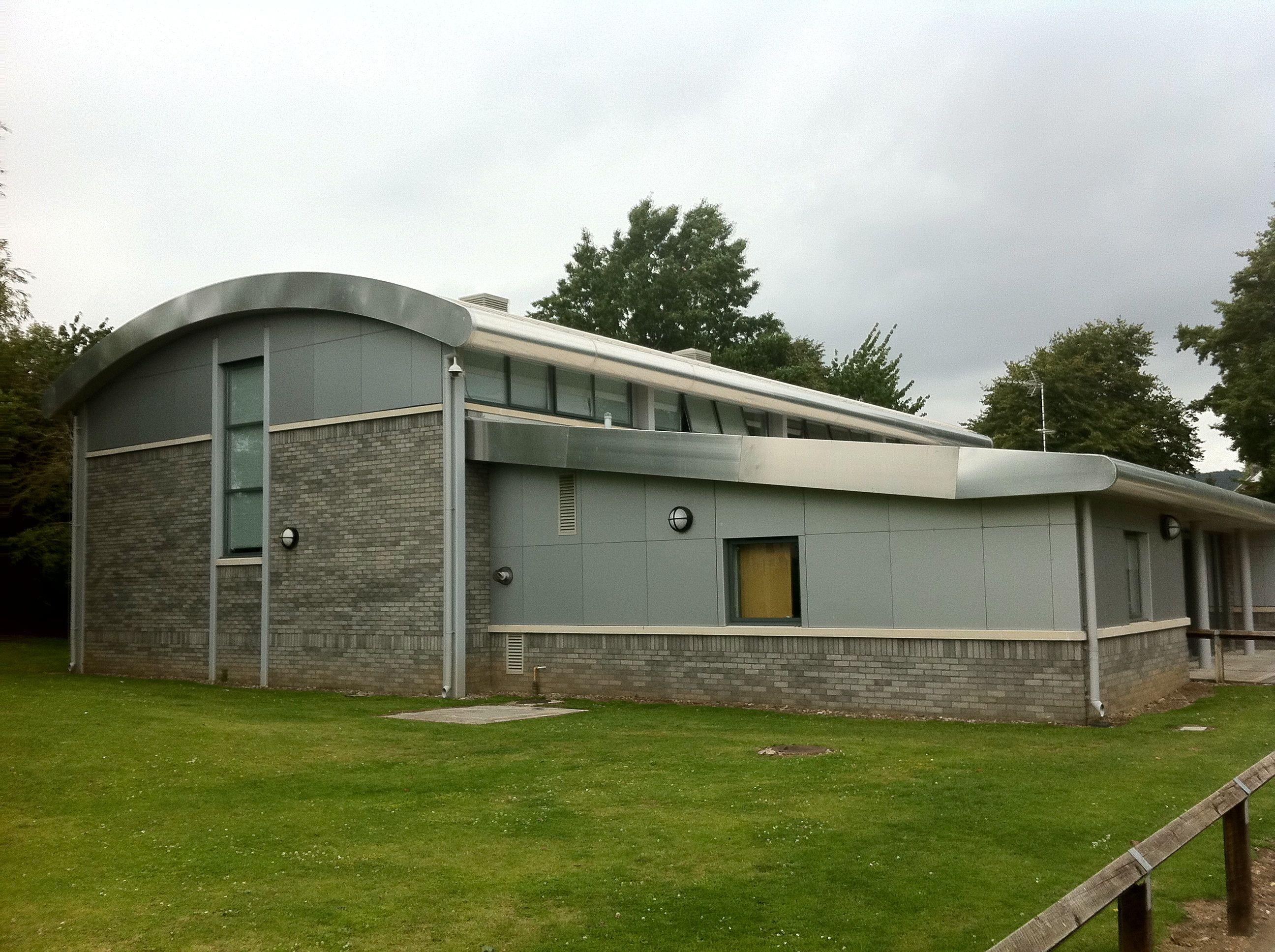
Kings Theatre opened in 2008.

In 2006, the school opened a new languages block. In January 2008, it opened a new drama building, Kings Theatre. The school obtained planning permission in 2017 for a new AstroTurf surface to enhance the sporting facilities at the academy.

== Kings Fitness and Leisure ==
The sports centre opened in 1994, becoming available for the first and middle Schools, as well as the upper school, in the Cheddar Valley. In April 2009, the whole site was taken over by Kings of Wessex. It was previously run by Somerset County Council, but is now owned and operated by the school and has been rebranded as Kings Fitness and Leisure. The takeover follows an attempt by Sedgemoor District Council, who subsidise the swimming pool, to reduce its funding contribution to the centre by diverting money set aside for maintenance to fund operation. The council's attempt was abandoned following a local protest campaign. The centre was granted planning permission in 2019 and underwent the extension and refurbishment between 2020 – Early 2021, the centre was re-opened after completion of the refurbishment and lifting of one of the COVID-19 lockdowns in England.

== In the media ==
The school has a reputation for maintaining strict discipline. In 2003, 22 children who were said to be wearing unsuitable uniforms were isolated in the school's supervised learning unit and forbidden to talk to each other. Some had been wearing plain blazers purchased at supermarkets, instead of the more expensive blazers with badges available only from the school outfitters. Although parents soon complied with the regulations, they compared the measures to Dickensian strictness and formed an action committee which protested to the local education authority and to Education Secretary Charles Clarke. The headteacher justified the action, saying it had the desired effect. The school pointed out that financial help is available for parents with modest means.

In January 2007, the school featured in TV and national newspaper reports following the punishment of a year 11 pupil for eating an apple in an area of the school where the consumption of food is forbidden. The pupil chose to ignore the 30-minute detention that he was given as punishment. As a result, he was given an after-school detention which he again ignored. The school then placed the pupil in the supervised learning unit for a day. The pupil's parents took the story to local TV station, ITV West News, and the story was picked up by the BBC, as well as local and national newspapers. The school defended its action and issued a press statement which said, "For health and safety reasons students are only allowed to eat in designated areas (the school hall and gym). All students are aware of this rule and the consequences of not adhering to it." It also said, "The Kings of Wessex is a high performing school and has high expectations of all students both in terms of academic work and behaviour. Kings is currently oversubscribed in all year groups. It is unfortunate this student and parents chose to escalate a relatively minor disciplinary incident by repeatedly refusing to accept the punishment." Subsequent press coverage praised the school for taking a firm stance on discipline.

In June 2009, the school once again made national headlines when the headteacher announced a ban on pupils kissing.

The academy also faced criticism from students and parents when it removed drama from its list of GCSE and A-Level options for the 2015/16 academic year. A petition was started and gained over 2000 signatures including that of former student, comedian and writer, Richard Herring. The move went through despite criticism, with all current drama students continuing until the end of their course.

The academy has also dealt with sporadic acts of violence by, and on, students over a number of years. This includes an incident where a student was stabbed on a school bus in October 2015. Police were called to the incident in Winscombe and investigated the matter. One student sadly passed away after the incident. In response to the matter, the school spokesperson, Jude Owens, said, "The academy enforces a strict behaviour policy and has high expectations for all students. In response to this incident the academy has taken prompt and appropriate action in accordance with academy policies and procedures."

== Notable students ==
- The comedian Richard Herring attended the school. His 2008 Edinburgh Festival Fringe show, The Headmaster's Son is based on his time at the school, where his father Keith was the headmaster. In November 2009, he returned to the school to perform the show in the school's Kings Theatre. He also visited the school in March 2010 to perform his show Hitler Moustache, in April 2011 to perform Christ on a bike, in April 2012 to perform What is Love, Anyway?, and in February 2014 to perform We're all going to die.
- The musician George Shelley, formerly of the boy band Union J, attended the school between 2006 and 2009.
- The journalist and author James Bloodworth attended the school.
