= List of scheduled monuments in Sedgemoor =

Sedgemoor shown within Somerset and England

Sedgemoor is a low-lying area of land in Somerset, England. It lies close to sea level south of the Polden Hills, forming a large part of the Somerset Levels and Moors, a wetland area between the Mendips and the Blackdown Hills. The Neolithic people exploited the reed swamps for their natural resources and started to construct wooden trackways, including the world's oldest known timber trackway, the Post Track, dating to the 3800s BC. The Levels were the location of the Iron Age Glastonbury Lake Village as well as two lake villages at Meare Lake. Several settlements and hill forts were built on the natural "islands" of slightly raised land, including Brent Knoll and Glastonbury. In the Roman period sea salt was extracted and a string of settlements were set up along the Polden Hills.

A scheduled monument is a nationally important archaeological site or monument which is given legal protection by being placed on a list (or "schedule") by the Secretary of State for Culture, Media and Sport; English Heritage takes the leading role in identifying such sites. The legislation governing this is the Ancient Monuments and Archaeological Areas Act 1979. The term "monument" can apply to the whole range of archaeological sites, and they are not always visible above ground. Such sites have to have been deliberately constructed by human activity. They range from prehistoric standing stones and burial sites, through Roman remains and medieval structures such as castles and monasteries, to later structures such as industrial sites and buildings constructed for the World Wars or the Cold War.

There are 79 scheduled monuments in Sedgemoor. The oldest are Neolithic, Bronze Age or Iron Age including hill forts, bowl barrows and occupied caves including several in Cheddar Gorge. Cannington Camp (which is also known as Cynwit Castle) dates from the Bronze Age, while Brent Knoll Camp between the Somerset Levels and Brean Down is Iron Age (although there are some Bronze Age artefacts) and it was reused in the Roman period. The Romano-British period is represented with several sites. Medieval sites include several motte-and-bailey castles and church or village crosses. Industrial development, particularly in Bridgwater, are represented by brick and tile kilns and a telescopic railway bridge. The most recent monuments are World War II bunkers and bombing decoys on Black Down. The monuments are listed below using the titles given in the English Heritage data sheets.

== Monuments ==
Name	Location	Type	Completed (Note: The date given is the date used by Historic England as significant for the initial building or that of an important part in the structure's description.)	Grid ref. (Note: Sometimes known as OSGB36, the grid reference is based on the British national grid reference system used by the Ordnance Survey.) Geo-coordinates	Notes	Entry number (Note: The "List Entry Number" is a unique number assigned to each listed building and scheduled monument by Historic England.)	Image	Ref.
Alstone lake settlement site	West Huntspill	Earthworks	Iron Age	ST 31297 46794; 51°12′58″N 2°59′06″W	The site was used in the Iron Age and again during the Romano-British and Medieval periods. It was at the edge of an inland lake which is now dry land.	1012311	Upload Photo	
Anglo-Saxon occupation site and site of Athelney Abbey on Athelney Hill	Lyng	Earthworks	9th century	ST 34330 29271; 51°03′33″N 2°56′04″W	Athelney Abbey was founded by King Alfred in 888, after he stayed there before the Battle of Edington, as a religious house for monks of the Order of St. Benedict. Originally Athelney was a small island in swampland. Following the dissolution it was acquired for use as a private residence by Lord Audley who had the church demolished. With the church demolished and other buildings fallen into disrepair, nothing visible remains at the site today. The site of the Abbey is marked by King Alfred's Monument which is a Grade II listed building.	1019099	Anglo-Saxon occupation site and site of Athelney Abbey on Athelney Hill	
Anglo-Saxon burh at East Lyng	Lyng	Earthworks	9th century	ST 33312 29034; 51°03′24″N 2°57′10″W	Earthworks remain of a burh which was important during the reign of Alfred the Great. It was surrounded by defensive banks and connected to Athelney Abbey by a causeway across marshland of the Somerset Levels.	1019100	Upload Photo	
Balt Moor Wall	Lyng	Earthworks	Middle Ages	ST 33826 29095; 51°03′27″N 2°56′44″W	Balt Moor Wall is an earthwork situated on the Somerset Levels to the northwest of the River Tone. The site contains the remains of a section of medieval causeway, which now forms a raised embankment between 6 metres (20 ft) and 10 metres (33 ft) wide and up to 2 metres (6 ft 7 in) high. The structure, which English Heritage refers to as "a rare example of medieval engineering", appears to have been built to protect the Salt Moor from the flooding of the River Tone in the Athelney-Lyng gap.	1018952	Upload Photo	
Barrow at Wilmot's Pool and a cairn 45 m to the north	Over Stowey	Bowl barrow and cairn	Bronze Age	ST1530838148; 51°08′11″N 3°12′43″W	The bowl barrow next to Wilmot's pool is 22 metres (72 ft) in diameter. The cairn, which is 45 millimetres (1.8 in) from the barrow, is approximately 4.5 metres (15 ft) in diameter and 0.6 metres (2 ft 0 in) high.	1417361	Upload Photo	
Blackford Manor House Moat	Blackford	Earthworks	14th century	ST 41022 47891; 51°13′38″N 2°50′46″W	Earthworks from a complex of buildings, including a hall and chapel, surrounded by a moat. The site is believed to have been a bishops palace demolished by John Harewell, the Bishop of Bath and Wells, in the 1380s.	1006135	Upload Photo	
Bowl barrow 75 m south west of Long House Barn	Cheddar	Bowl barrow	Neolithic to Bronze Age	ST 47777 56015; 51°18′03″N 2°45′02″W	A bowl barrow approximately 12 metres (39 ft) in diameter.	1014712	Upload Photo	
Bowl barrow 91 m south of Piney Sleight Farm	Cheddar	Bowl barrow	Bronze Age	ST 47589 55263; 51°17′39″N 2°45′11″W	A bowl barrow approximately 9 metres (30 ft) in diameter.	1010922	Upload Photo	
Bowl barrow 190 m south west of Tyning's Farm: part of the Tyning's Farm round barrow cemetery	Cheddar	Bowl barrow	Bronze Age	ST 46849 56376; 51°18′14″N 2°45′50″W	A bowl barrow approximately 14 metres (46 ft) in diameter.	1012593	Upload Photo	
Bowl barrow 250 m south east of Tyning's Farm: part of the Tyning's Farm round barrow cemetery	Cheddar	Bowl barrow	Bronze Age	ST 47085 56283; 51°18′12″N 2°45′37″W	A bowl barrow approximately 15 metres (49 ft) in diameter.	1015815	Bowl barrow 250 m south east of Tyning's Farm: part of the Tyning's Farm round barrow cemetery	
Bowl barrow 250 m south west of Ashridge Farm	Cheddar	Bowl barrow	Bronze Age	ST 46472 55781; 51°17′55″N 2°46′09″W	A bowl barrow approximately 20 metres (66 ft) in diameter.	1012592	Upload Photo	
Bowl barrow 300 m east of Batts Coombe Quarry	Cheddar	Bowl barrow	Bronze Age	ST 46612 55154; 51°17′35″N 2°46′01″W	A bowl barrow approximately 14 metres (46 ft) in diameter.	1010800	Bowl barrow 300 m east of Batts Coombe Quarry	
Bowl barrow 300 m north east of Tyning's Farm	Cheddar	Bowl barrow	Bronze Age	ST 47248 56680; 51°18′24″N 2°45′29″W	A bowl barrow approximately 18 metres (59 ft) in diameter.	1011584	Upload Photo	
Bowl barrow 330 m east of Batts Coombe Quarry	Cheddar	Bowl barrow	Bronze Age	ST 46539 55021; 51°17′30″N 2°46′05″W	A bowl barrow approximately 15 metres (49 ft) in diameter.	1010753	Upload Photo	
Bowl barrow 350 m east of Batts Coombe Quarry	Cheddar	Bowl barrow	Bronze Age	ST 46585 55059; 51°17′32″N 2°46′03″W	A bowl barrow approximately 18 metres (59 ft) in diameter.	1010921	Upload Photo	
Bowl barrow 400 m southeast of Wellington Farm	Cheddar	Bowl barrow	Bronze Age	ST 49457 53390; 51°16′39″N 2°43′34″W	A bowl barrow approximately 18 metres (59 ft) in diameter.	1011533	Upload Photo	
Brent Knoll hillfort and associated field system	Brent Knoll	Hill fort	Iron Age	ST 34124 51021; 51°15′15″N 2°56′44″W	Brent Knoll Camp is at the summit of a 137-metre (449 ft) high hill which dominates the low surrounding landscape of the Somerset Levels. Brent Knoll has seen human settlement since at least the Bronze Age, becoming an Iron Age Fort about 2,000 B.C., which covers an area of 1.6 hectares (4.0 acres). It is defended by a single wall around 10 metres (33 ft) high and by a single ditch. The Romans used its summit as a fortification. The fort has been claimed as the site of Mons Badonicus.	1008248	Brent Knoll hillfort and associated field system	
Brick and tile kiln west of East Quay, 200 m east of Bridgwater Dock lock	Bridgwater	Kiln	19th century	ST 29997 37635; 51°07′43″N 2°59′38″W	The Somerset Brick and Tile Museum incorporates the last surviving 'pinnacle kiln' in Bridgwater, which dates from the 19th century. It is 21 metres (69 ft) high and the circular base is 4 metres (13 ft) in diameter.	1019900	Brick and tile kiln west of East Quay, 200 m east of Bridgwater Dock lock	
Bronze Age and Iron Age trackways 600 m north east of Northbrook Farm	Shapwick	Timber trackway	Bronze Age and Iron Age	ST 43666 39241; 51°08′59″N 2°48′24″W	The site of Bronze and Iron Age trackways in the peaty soil of the Somerset Levels close to the base of the Polden Hills.	1014444	Upload Photo	
Bronze Age and Iron Age timber trackways, 700 m north west of Coppice Gate Farm	Shapwick	Timber trackway	Bronze Age and Iron Age	ST 42679 39790; 51°09′16″N 2°49′16″W	The site of Bronze and Iron Age trackways in the peaty soil of the Shapwick Heath area of the Somerset Levels.	1014431	Upload Photo	
Cairn 500 m north west of Quantock Farm	Over Stowey	Cairn	Bronze Age	ST 15423 37164; 51°07′39″N 3°12′36″W	A cairn mound which is approximately 12.5 metres (41 ft) in diameter surrounded by a bank and ditch.	1019801	Upload Photo	
Chandos Glass Cone, at the junction of Northgate and Valetta Place	Bridgwater	Kiln	1725	ST 29852 37396; 51°07′53″N 3°00′14″W	The remains of a kiln built in 1725 as part of a glassworks. The kiln was originally 33 metres (108 ft) high. The remaining brickwork is between 2.4 metres (7 ft 10 in) and 0.6 metres (2 ft 0 in) high and up to 1.2 metres (3 ft 11 in) thick.	1019899	Chandos Glass Cone, at the junction of Northgate and Valetta Place More images	
Chapel Chapel E of Adscombe Farm	Over Stowey	Chapel	13th century	ST 18414 37782; 51°08′01″N 3°10′03″W	The remains of walls of a 13th-century chapel which as 13 metres (42 ft) long and 6.1 metres (20 ft) wide.	1006133	Chapel Chapel E of Adscombe Farm More images	
Churchyard cross in St George's churchyard	Wembdon	Cross	15th century	ST 28938 37942; 51°08′11″N 3°01′02″W	A 15th-century churchyard cross on an octagonal base. The shaft is approximately 1.9 metres (6 ft 3 in) high; however the head of the cross is missing.	1015454	Upload Photo	
Churchyard cross in St Mary the Virgin's churchyard	North Petherton	Cross	15th century	ST 29027 33052; 51°05′33″N 3°00′53″W	A restored churchyard cross. The octagonal base is original; however the shaft was removed as unsafe and replaced in 1962.	1015455	Upload Photo	
Churchyard cross in All Saints' churchyard	Broomfield	Cross	13th century	ST 22431 32009; 51°04′56″N 3°06′32″W	A 13th-century churchyard cross. The shaft is 2.5 metres (8 ft 2 in) high; however the head of the cross is missing.	1015456	Churchyard cross in All Saints' churchyard	
Churchyard cross in St Michael's churchyard	Enmore	Cross	15th century	ST 23987 35193; 51°06′39″N 3°05′14″W	A 15th-century churchyard cross. The shaft is 1.5 metres (4 ft 11 in) high; however, the head of the cross is missing.	1015457	Churchyard cross in St Michael's churchyard	
Churchyard cross in St Margaret's churchyard	Spaxton	Cross	14th century	ST 22531 37018; 51°07′38″N 3°06′30″W	A 14th-century churchyard cross. The shaft is 2.5 metres (8 ft 2 in) high, with a round moulding and square cross head.	1015458	Churchyard cross in St Margaret's churchyard More images	
Churchyard cross in St Mary's churchyard	Nether Stowey	Cross	14th century	ST 19678 39614; 51°09′00″N 3°08′59″W	A 14th-century churchyard cross. The broken shaft is 0.2 metres (7.9 in) high.	1015452	Upload Photo	
Churchyard cross 5.6 m south east of the porch of St Martin's Church	Fiddington	Cross	14th century	ST 21578 40581; 51°09′32″N 3°07′22″W	A 14th-century churchyard cross. The shaft is 1.7 metres (5 ft 7 in) high; however, the head is missing.	1015453	Churchyard cross 5.6 m south east of the porch of St Martin's Church	
Cynwit Castle	Cannington	Hill fort	Bronze Age and Iron Age	ST 24682 40489; 51°09′33″N 3°04′51″W	A Bronze Age and Iron Age hill fort. The small hill rises to 80 metres (260 ft) above low lying land about 1.5 kilometres (0.93 mi) west of the tidal estuary of the River Parrett, near the ancient port and ford at Combwich. The hill fort is roughly square in shape, with a single rampart (univallate) enclosing 5 hectares (12 acres), and the main entrance to the south-east. The north side of the hill has been destroyed by quarrying during the 19th and 20th centuries. Minor excavations were carried out in 1905, 1913 (Bezell), and 1963 (Rahtz). Flint tools, scrapers and flakes have been found on or near the hill, indicating Mesolithic occupation. Bronze Age finds include an axe head and a knife. The area destroyed by quarrying was a late Roman and Saxon cemetery, with several hundred E-W (Christian) graves, and various grave goods such as coins and pottery from the period 350-800 AD.	1006225	Cynwit Castle	
Dead Woman's Ditch cross-dyke, Robin Upright's Hill	Over Stowey	Earthworks	Bronze Age	ST 16040 38477; 51°08′22″N 3°12′05″W	The remains of a 1 kilometre (0.62 mi) long cross dyke over the Quantock Hills. The bank is 1 metre (3 ft 3 in) high and has a ditch on its western side. The name Dead Woman's Ditch was thought to relate to a woman murdered in 1789, although it is now known to have earlier usage.	1008254	Dead Woman's Ditch cross-dyke, Robin Upright's Hill	
Duck decoy, west of Nyland Hill	Cheddar	Duck decoy	17th century	ST 45260 50294; 51°14′57″N 2°47′09″W	A six pipe duck decoy on a low lying area in the valley of the River Axe. It was constructed before 1668 but redug in 1762 and fell out of use after 1813.	1014452	Upload Photo	
Duck decoy, 770 m SSE of Gold Corner Bridge	Cossington	Duck decoy	18th or 19th century	ST 37036 42486; 51°10′41″N 2°54′08″W	A four pipe duck decoy with two small islands in the pool.	1014858	Upload Photo	
Duck decoy 175 m south west of Parson's Farm	Cheddar	Duck decoy	17th century	ST 43481 52403; 51°16′05″N 2°48′41″W	A three pipe duck decoy with an infilled pool which is 60 metres (200 ft) by 55 metres (180 ft). It was built before 1673 and fell out of use by 1788.	1014445	Upload Photo	
Gorsey Bigbury earth circle and round barrow near Longwood	Cheddar	Henge	Neolithic	ST 48427 55846; 51°17′58″N 2°44′28″W	Gorsey Bigbury is an earth henge about 22 metres (72 ft) in diameter. The nearby Longwood Barrow may be a long barrow or a misshapen round barrow.	1006221	Upload Photo	
Gough's Cave, Cheddar Gorge	Cheddar	Cave	Palaeolithic	ST 46714 53917; 51°16′53″N 2°45′51″W	Gough's Cave is located in Cheddar Gorge on the Mendip Hills. The cave is 90 metres (295 ft) deep and is 2.135 kilometres (1.33 mi) long, and contains a variety of large chambers and rock formations. It contains the Cheddar Yeo, the largest underground river system in Britain. The cave contained skeletal remains of both humans and animals, all showing cut-marks and breakage consistent with de-fleshing and eating. In 1903 the remains of a human male, since named Cheddar Man, were found a short distance inside Gough's Cave. He is Britain's oldest complete human skeleton, having been dated to approximately 7150 B.C. A Skull cup dating from 14,700 B.C. has been uncovered at the site. The first 820 metres (2,690 ft) of the cave are open to the public as a show cave, and this stretch contains most of the more spectacular formations. The greater part of the cave's length is made up of the river passage, which is accessible only by cave diving.	1011925	Gough's Cave, Cheddar Gorge	
Gough's Old Cave	Cheddar	Cave	Palaeolithic	ST 46688 53886; 51°16′54″N 2°45′57″W	A series of caves in Cheddar Gorge from which Iron Age and Romano-British artefacts have been found overlying cut marked horse bone dating from approximately 12,500 years ago.	1012064	Upload Photo	
Great Oone's Hole	Cheddar	Cave	Palaeolithic	ST 46796 53936; 51°16′56″N 2°45′51″W	A cave in Cheddar Gorge from which flint artefacts from the Late Upper Palaeolithic have been recovered.	1010906	Upload Photo	
Group of three bowl barrows 180 m south of Tyning's Farm: part of the Tyning's Farm round barrow cemetery	Cheddar	Bowl barrow	Bronze Age	ST 46995 56339; 51°18′13″N 2°45′42″W	A round barrow cemetery consisting of three barrows from which bones and a ceramic urn have been recovered.	1012594	Group of three bowl barrows 180 m south of Tyning's Farm: part of the Tyning's Farm round barrow cemetery	
Horsey medieval settlement immediately north of Board's Farm	Horsey	Earthworks	Middle Ages	ST 31929 39272; 51°08′55″N 2°58′29″W	Earthworks from a medieval settlement and surrounding fields. The platforms of several buildings survive at, or just below, ground level.	1020438	Upload Photo	
Longbottom Farm earthwork	Shipham	Earthworks	Unknown	ST 45748 56837; 51°18′29″N 2°46′47″W	An enclosure surrounded by a bank and ditch.	1003028	Upload Photo	
Manor house at Mudgley	Wedmore	Earthworks	Middle Ages	ST 44310 45626; 51°12′26″N 2°47′55″W	Earthworks from several houses and associated fields.	1006136	Upload Photo	
Market cross at the junction of Bath Street, Union Street and Church Street	Cheddar	Market cross	15th century	ST4592153202; 51°16′31″N 2°46′36″W	The first part of the market cross was built in the 15th and included a central octagonal pillar. In the 16th or 17th century it was enclosed with a hexagonal arch structure. The cross head was added in 1877.	1019033	Market cross at the junction of Bath Street, Union Street and Church Street More images	
Medieval estate boundary earthwork on Shute Shelve Hill	Axbridge	Earthworks	Middle Ages	ST 42768 56077; 51°18′03″N 2°49′20″W	Earthworks from a bank and ditch which may have marked the boundary of the Compton Bishop estate according to a 1067 charter. In the 13th century it was associated with the boundary of the Royal Forest of Mendip.	1015495	Medieval estate boundary earthwork on Shute Shelve Hill	
Medieval settlement 160 m south and 240 m south west of Sandford Farm	Cannington	Earthworks	Middle Ages	ST 26957 37771; 51°08′04″N 3°02′43″W	Earthworks from a medieval village which had a population of 40 to 45 people.	1020016	Upload Photo	
Moated site at Edithmead	Edithmead	Motte-and-bailey castle	Middle Ages	ST 32916 49302; 51°14′20″N 2°57′44″W	Earthworks from a site occupied in the Middle Ages. Pottery from the 14th century has been found at the site.	1006134	Upload Photo	
Motte with two baileys immediately east of Bristol Road, Down End	Puriton	Motte-and-bailey castle	c. 1100	ST 30896 41366; 51°10′03″N 2°59′32″W	The remains of Down End Castle consist of earthworks from a Motte-and-bailey castle.	1019291	Motte with two baileys immediately east of Bristol Road, Down End	
Multi-period site on Brean Down	Bridgwater Bay	Earthworks, Fort	Neolithic, Bronze Age, Iron Age, Romano-British, Middle Ages, Victorian era, World War II	ST 28790 58958; 51°19′32″N 3°01′44″W	Brean Down is a promontory off the coast, standing 97 metres (318 ft) high and extending 2 kilometres (1.5 mi) into the Bristol Channel at the eastern end of Bridgwater Bay between Weston-super-Mare and Burnham-on-Sea. Made of Carboniferous Limestone, it is a continuation of the Mendip Hills. Two further continuations are the small islands of Steep Holm and Flat Holm. The cliffs on the northern and southern flanks of Brean Down have large quantities of fossils laid down in the marine deposits about 320–350 million years ago. The site has been occupied by humans since the late Bronze Age and includes the remains of a Romano-Celtic Temple. At the seaward end is Brean Down Fort which was built in 1865 and then re-armed in the Second World War. Brean Down is now owned by the National Trust, and is rich in wildlife, history and archaeology. It is a Site of Special Scientific Interest due to both the geology and presence of nationally rare plants including the white rock-rose. It has also been scheduled as an ancient monument.	1008211	Multi-period site on Brean Down More images	
Picken's Hole	Compton Bishop	Cave	Palaeolithic	ST 39680 55004; 51°17′28″N 2°51′59″W	A small cave from which a large number of Middle Palaeolithic artefacts, and two Neanderthal teeth dated to about 55,000 years BP, have been recovered.	1010715	Upload Photo	
Plainsfield Camp slight univallate hillfort	Aisholt	Hill fort	Iron Age	ST181363; 51°07′11″N 3°10′12″W	Plainsfield Camp (or Park Plantation or Cockercombe Castle) is a possible Iron Age earthwork on the Quantock Hills, but may have been an animal enclosure.	1007669	Plainsfield Camp slight univallate hillfort	
Platform cairn, 180 m east of Wilmot's Pool	Over Stowey	Cairn	Bronze Age	ST1548538136; 51°08′10″N 3°12′33″W	A platform cairn on the Quantock Hills.	1417363	Upload Photo	
Prehistoric timber trackways, 670 m SSE of Parchey Bridge	Stawell	Timber trackway	Neolithic to Iron Age	ST 35497 37162; 51°07′48″N 2°55′24″W	The remains of several prehistoric trackways in the peaty soil of the Somerset Levels.	1014430	Upload Photo	
Roman briquetage mounds on Burtle Moor	Burtle	Briquetage mounds	Romano-British	ST 39461 44433; 51°11′45″N 2°52′04″W	The remains of salt mounds used in Roman times. The largest is approximately 10.5 metres (34 ft) in diameter.	1006148	Upload Photo	
Roman settlement site, Anglo-Saxon and Norman royal palace, and St Columbanus' Chapel	Cheddar	Ruined palace	Romano-British, Anglo-Saxon and Norman	ST456531; 51°16′29″N 2°46′44″W	Cheddar Palace was established in the 9th century. It was a royal hunting lodge in the Anglo-Saxon and medieval periods and hosted the Witenagemot in the 10th century. Nearby are the ruins of the 14th-century St Columbanus Chapel. Roman artifacts and a burial have also been discovered. The site of the palace is now marked by concrete slabs within the grounds of The Kings of Wessex Academy.	1017290	Roman settlement site, Anglo-Saxon and Norman royal palace, and St Columbanus' Chapel More images	
Romano-British settlement on Stoke Moor	Cheddar	Earthworks	Romano-British	ST 45999 48984; 51°14′15″N 2°46′30″W	Earthworks including roadways and courtyards from a Roman settlement covering 18.5 hectares (46 acres). Artefacts from the site have included coins and pottery.	1011125	Upload Photo	
Round barrows 600yds (550m) NW of Longbottom Farm	Shipham	Round barrow	Bronze Age	ST 45319 57012; 51°18′35″N 2°47′09″W	A pair of probable round barrows	1006223	Upload Photo	
Rowberrow Cavern, Mendip Forest	Rowberrow	Cave	Palaeolithic	ST 45954 58022; 51°19′07″N 2°46′37″W	The cave includes a Palaeolithic hearth floor. Iron Age and Roman remains have also been uncovered.	1011926	Upload Photo	
Rowberrow Camp: an Iron Age defended settlement north west of Tynings Farm	Rowberrow	Earthworks	Iron Age	ST 46442 56836; 51°18′29″N 2°46′11″W	Rowberrow Camp was an Iron Age defended settlement covering 0.36 hectares (0.89 acres) and surrounded by a bank and ditch.	1008806	Upload Photo	
Ruborough Camp large univallate hillfort	Broomfield	Hill fort	Iron Age	ST226336; 51°05′46″N 3°06′18″W	The Ruborough Camp hill fort is on an easterly spur from the main Quantock ridge, with steep natural slopes to the north and south-east. The fort is triangular in shape, with a single rampart and ditch (univallate), enclosing 1.8 hectares (4.4 acres). There is a linear outer work about 120 m away, parallel to the westerly rampart, enclosing another 1.8 ha. There was a tunnel, which has now been filed in, which gave the camp safe access to a nearby spring for water. The site is on the Heritage at Risk Register.	1007670	Ruborough Camp large univallate hillfort	
Saye's Hole, Cheddar Gorge	Cheddar	Cave	Iron Age	ST 46637 53897; 51°16′54″N 2°45′59″W	A small cave occupied during the Iron Age. Excavation has found pottery and other artefacts from that period.	1011916	Upload Photo	
Sections of the Sweet Track and Post Track, 650 m east of Canada Farm	Shapwick	Timber trackway	3807 or 3806 B.C.	ST 42355 40466; 51°09′38″N 2°49′33″W	A section of the Sweet Track, an ancient causeway in the Somerset Levels. Construction was of crossed wooden poles, driven into the waterlogged soil to support a walkway that consisted mainly of planks of oak, laid end-to-end. The track was only used for a period of around 10 years and was then abandoned, probably due to rising water levels. The specific date of construction is a result of Dendrochronology of the timbers recovered. Following its discovery in 1970, most of the track has been left in its original location, with active conservation measures taken, including a water pumping and distribution system to maintain the wood in its damp condition.	1014439	Upload Photo	
Soldier's Hole, Cheddar Gorge	Cheddar	Cave	Late Upper Palaeolithic	ST 46862 54008; 51°16′58″N 2°45′48″W	Artefacts from the cave demonstrate occupation during the Late Upper Palaeolithic. The faunal remains have been Radiocarbon dated to 35,000 years ago to c.10,000 years ago.	1011914	Upload Photo	
Sections of the Sweet Track, the Post Track and associated remains 500 m north east of Moorgate Farm	Shapwick	Timber trackway	3807 or 3806 B.C.	ST420401; 51°09′25″N 2°49′44″W	A section of the Sweet Track, an ancient causeway in the Somerset Levels. Construction was of crossed wooden poles, driven into the waterlogged soil to support a walkway that consisted mainly of planks of oak, laid end-to-end. The track was only used for a period of around 10 years and was then abandoned, probably due to rising water levels. Following its discovery in 1970, most of the track has been left in its original location, with active conservation measures taken, including a water pumping and distribution system to maintain the wood in its damp condition.	1014438	Sections of the Sweet Track, the Post Track and associated remains 500 m north east of Moorgate Farm	
Settlement SE of Cannington Park	Cannington	Earthworks	Possibly Iron Age, Romano-British or later	ST 24570 40268; 51°09′24″N 3°04′48″W	Earthworks of uncertain date which may show the site of a settlement or field system.	1002958	Upload Photo	
Star Roman villa, 275 m north east of Wimblestone	Shipham	Roman villa	Romano-British	ST 43534 58685; 51°19′28″N 2°48′42″W	Earthworks from a small Roman villa and associated buildings arranged around a courtyard, which were built on a previously occupied site.	1015499	Upload Photo	
Stowey Castle, the site of St Michael's Chapel and a medieval kiln site	Nether Stowey	Motte-and-bailey	11th century	ST186396; 51°08′58″N 3°09′47″W	Stowey Castle (or Nether Stowey Castle known locally as The Mount) was a Norman motte-and-bailey castle, built in the 11th century, in the village of Nether Stowey on the Quantock Hills.	1019421	Stowey Castle, the site of St Michael's Chapel and a medieval kiln site	
Sun Hole, Cheddar Gorge	Cheddar	Cave	Palaeolithic	ST 46737 54080; 51°17′00″N 2°45′54″W	Artefacts from the cave demonstrate occupation during the Palaeolithic.	1011915	Upload Photo	
Telescopic rail bridge over the River Parrett, 270 m south east of Bridgwater Dock lock	Bridgwater	Bridge	1871	ST 30020 37423; 51°07′54″N 3°00′05″W	The retractable bridge was built in 1871 for the Bristol and Exeter Railway. It carried a railway siding over the river at the coal yard and docks in the Port of Bridgwater, but had to be movable, to allow boats to proceed upriver to the Town Bridge. The bridge was temporarily immobilised during World War II and last opened in 1953, and the traverser section was demolished in 1974.	1020624	Telescopic rail bridge over the River Parrett, 270 m south east of Bridgwater Dock lock More images	
The Chapel, Shearston	North Petherton	Possible chapel	Middle Ages or post-medieval	ST 28179 30581; 51°04′12″N 3°01′35″W	The possible site of chapel which may also have been a homestead surrounded by a moat.	1006166	Upload Photo	
Timber trackways at Moor Drove, 800 m east of Brentsfield Bridge	Chedzoy	Timber trackway	Neolithic	ST 34840 36180; 51°07′16″N 2°55′57″W	Two pieces of a timber trackway which were identified when water levels fell, as the site is waterlogged or under water normally.	1014872	Upload Photo	
Timber trackways 850 m east of Catcott Burtle Farm	Burtle	Timber trackway	Neolithic	ST 41142 43152; 51°11′05″N 2°50′37″W	Sections of several timber trackways including the Honeygore, Honeycat and Honeybee Tracks which were constructed between 3650 and 2870 B.C.	1014433	Upload Photo	
Twin round barrows 750 yd (696 m) N of Bowpit Farm	Cheddar	Round barrows	Bronze Age	ST 45822 55799; 51°17′55″N 2°46′43″W	Possibly two round barrows or one bowl barrow on an oval mound.	1006222	Upload Photo	
Village cross	Wedmore	Cross	14th century	ST 43656 47849; 51°13′37″N 2°48′30″W	A stone cross on a five step base which supports a 2.2-metre (7 ft 3 in) high shaft with a lantern head.	1015450	Village cross More images	
Wayside cross at Stoughton Cross	Wedmore	Wayside Cross	15th century	ST4247849658; 51°14′35″N 2°49′32″W	The cross is 1.9 metres (6 ft 3 in) high and stands on a three-step base. It was moved approximately 15 metres (49 ft) from its original 15th-century position.	1015451	Wayside cross at Stoughton Cross	
Wimblestone standing stone	Shipham	Standing stone	Unknown	ST 43345 58475; 51°19′21″N 2°48′52″W	A 1.5-metre (5 ft) high stone slab.	1006137	Wimblestone standing stone	
Wooden trackways on Chilton Moor, 300 m west of Station Farm	Burtle	Timber trackway	Neolithic	ST 38800 42639; 51°10′47″N 2°52′37″W	The remains of several brushwood trackways dating from the Neolithic period.	1014437	Upload Photo	
World War II anti-aircraft rocket battery and bombing decoy control building 265 m north east of Ashridge Farm	Black Down	Earthworks	World War II	ST 46852 56110; 51°18′06″N 2°45′49″W	The remains of a Z Battery, a short range anti-aircraft weapon system, which launched 3-inch (76 mm) diameter rockets from ground-based single and multiple launchers, for air defence. Most of the battery has been removed; however the control building survives.	1020994	World War II anti-aircraft rocket battery and bombing decoy control building 265 m north east of Ashridge Farm	
World War II bombing decoy complex, anti-aircraft obstructions and Beacon Batch round barrow cemetery on Black Down	Black Down	Earthworks	World War II	ST 47960 57110; 51°18′39″N 2°44′53″W	The remains of bombing decoys and anti-aircraft obstructions in the form of earth and stone mounds. They are in the same area as prehistoric round barrows.	1020995	Upload Photo	

== See also ==
- Scheduled Monuments in Somerset
- Grade I listed buildings in Sedgemoor
- Grade II* listed buildings in Sedgemoor
