= Somerset Brick and Tile Museum =

Museum in Bridgwater, Somerset, England

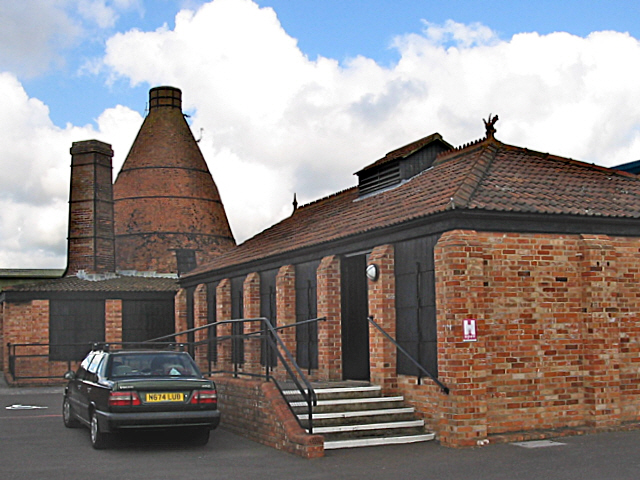

- Location within Somerset and the United Kingdom
- Established: 1990s
- Location: Bridgwater, Somerset
- Coordinates: 51.1285°N 2.9938°W
- Website: Somerset Brick and Tile Museum

The Somerset Brick and Tile Museum is in Bridgwater, Somerset, England and is administered by The South West Heritage Trust.

The museum is dedicated to the Brick and Tile Industry of Somerset. Bridgwater had been a centre of trade and industry since the Middle Ages, benefiting from local clay from the alluvial deposits of the River Parrett to make bricks and tiles. In the 1840s there were 1,300 people in Bridgwater employed making bricks and tiles.

The Chandos Glass Cone was built in 1725 as a glasswork firing kiln by James Brydges, 1st Duke of Chandos as part of an industrial development. After a short period of use for glassmaking it was converted for the production of pottery, bricks and tiles, which continued until 1939. The majority of the brickwork cone was demolished in 1943. The bottom 2.4 metres (7 ft 10 in) has been preserved and scheduled as an ancient monument.

It incorporates the last surviving 'pinnacle kiln' in Bridgwater, which dates from the 19th century, and has been scheduled as an ancient monument and Grade II* listed building. It used to be one of six at the former Barham Brothers' Yard at East Quay. The industry declined during the 20th century as the products of the London Brick Company were more uniform than those produced in Bridgwater, and the increasing use of concrete after World War II. The kiln was last fired in 1965, the year that the works closed. The other kiln, built in 1858 by Alfred Barham, was originally used for up-draught firing and converted to the more energy efficient down-draught firing.

The existing works were converted into a museum in the 1990s. Demonstrated inside are the tools, methods and processes involved in making a variety of bricks, tiles, and terracotta plaques.
