= Down End Castle =

- Dunball, Puriton, Somerset, England
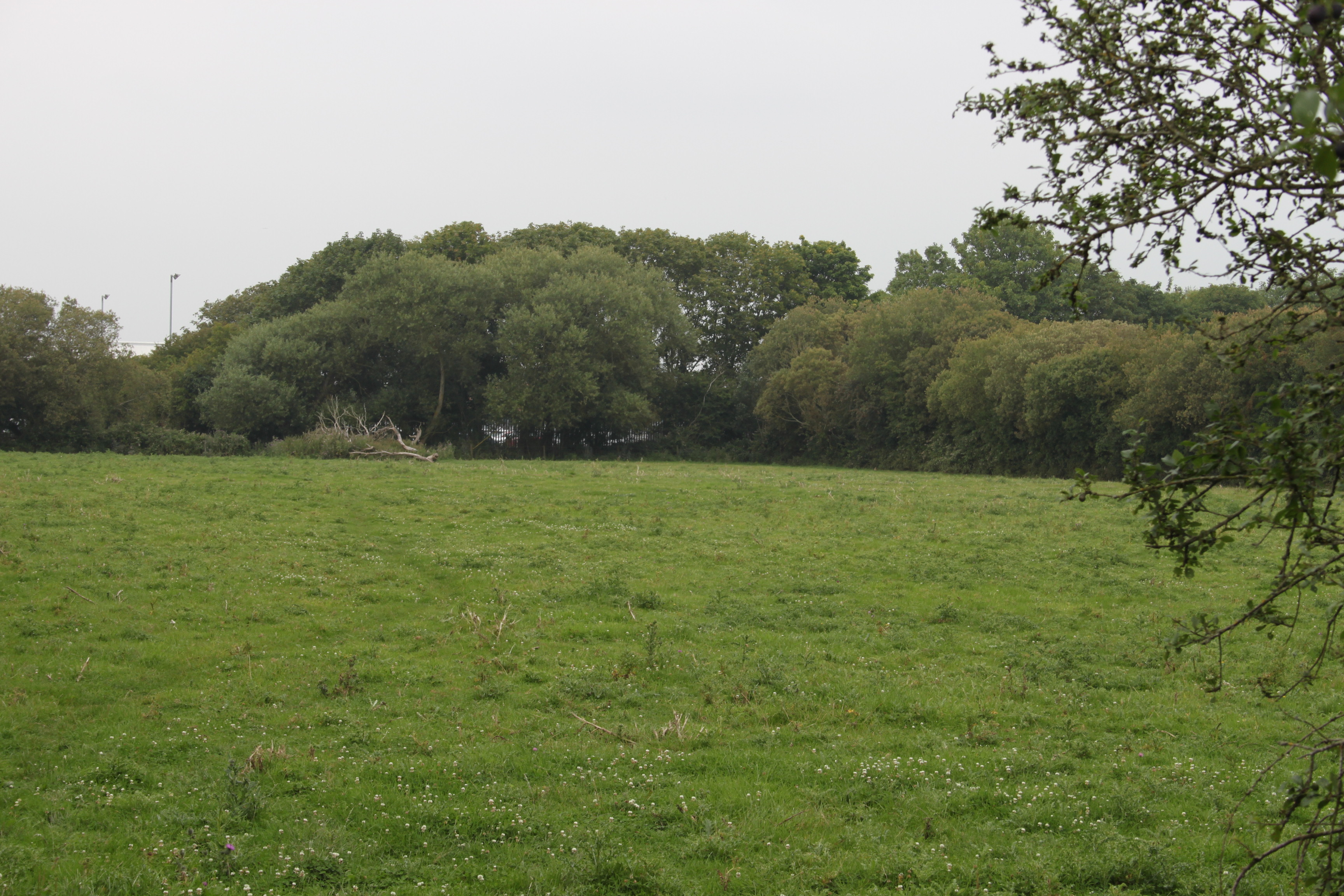

Site information
- Type: Motte and bailey

Location
- Shown within Somerset
- Coordinates: 51.1674°N 2.9921°W

Down End Castle, also known as Downend Castle, Chisley Mount or Chidley Mount, was a motte-and-bailey castle at Down End, north of Dunball in the parish of Puriton, Somerset, England. It has been designated as a Scheduled Ancient Monument.

== History ==
Down End Castle was built at Down End, north of Dunball in Somerset, England. The castle has a motte and bailey design, with the two baileys lying to the north of the motte; the inner bailey has one bank and the outer one a double bank. The mound measures 30 metres (98 ft) across the top, and may have exploited an existing Viking site. The castle was once fed water by a natural spring at the base of the motte.

Recent academic work has suggested that the castle was built around 1100, after the surrounding region of Somerset had become stable in the years following the Norman invasion of England and the subsequent Anglo-Saxon rebellion against Norman rule. The location Down End was strategically well placed, as the nearby Parrett is an important tidal river, essential for trade during the early medieval period. The de Columbers were probably responsible for building the castle, which also enjoyed a good defensive position on a natural ridge, protected by several nearby streams; the family also built nearby Stowey Castle. Norman and later pottery and iron objects were found during excavations in 1908; these match those found at the nearby castle of Neroche, also built around 1100. (Note: The dating of the Down End earthworks has resulted in considerable academic debate. The 1908 investigations found Norman remains on the site, but there is no early documentary evidence for a castle on the site, leading early investigators to suspect an early date for the earthworks. The most recent academic work on Norman Somerset castles, by Stuart Prior, argues strongly in favour of an 1100 dating for the castle, with the fortification exploiting previous Viking earthworks.)

Down End became a new borough town in 1225, but may have existed as a settlement and port from 1159 onwards; the de Columbers were lords of the manor of nearby Puriton in the late 12th century. After the creation of Bridgwater town and castle, however, Down End began to face fierce competition as a port: Bridgwater eventually became dominant and Down End went into decline. Today only the earthworks remain, and the site is a scheduled monument.

== See also ==
- Castles in Great Britain and Ireland
- List of castles in England

== Bibliography ==
- Chater, A. G. and F. Albany. (1909) "Excavations at Downend, near Bridgwater, 1908", Proceedings of the Somerset Archaeological and Natural History Society 55, pp. 162–7.
- Creighton, Oliver Hamilton. (2005) Castles and Landscapes: Power, Community and Fortification in Medieval England. London: Equinox. ISBN 978-1-904768-67-8.
- Dunning, Robert. (1995) Somerset Castles. Tiverton, UK: Somerset Books. ISBN 978-0-86183-278-1.
- Gathercole, Clare. (2003) An Archaeological Assessment of Down End: Somerset Extensive Urban Survey. Taunton, UK: Somerset County Council.
- Prior, Stuart. (2006) The Norman Art of War: a Few Well-Positioned Castles. Stroud, UK: Tempus. ISBN 0-7524-3651-1.
