= Westonzoyland Pumping Station Museum =

English industrial heritage museum

Westonzoyland Pumping Station Museum of Steam Power & Land Drainage
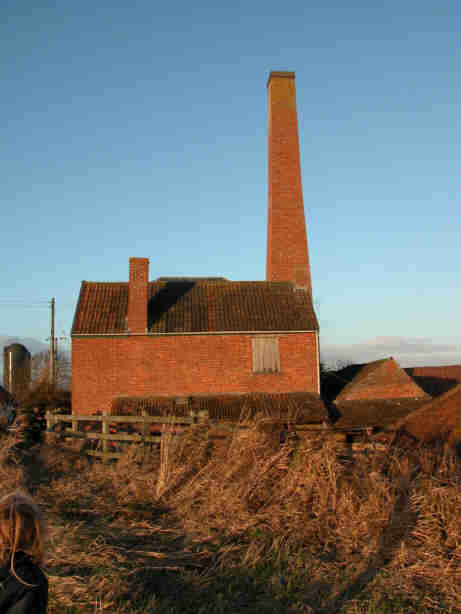
- Westonzoyland Pumping Station Museum

- Location within Somerset

General information
- Location: Westonzoyland, England
- Coordinates: 51°05′27″N 2°56′40″W

Listed Building – Grade II*
- Official name: Westonzoyland Engine Trust Old Pumping Station at NGR ST3396232827
- Designated: 24 June 1987
- Reference no.: 1174295
- Completed: 1861

The Westonzoyland Pumping Station Museum of Steam Power and Land Drainage is a small industrial heritage museum dedicated to steam powered machinery at Westonzoyland in the English county of Somerset. It is a Grade II* listed building.

The museum is housed in an 1830 brick-built pumping station which was the first of several similar pumping stations to be built on the Somerset Levels which are prone to flooding. The main attraction is the 1861 Easton and Amos steam engine and pump, the only one still in its original location and in working order. The museum, which is run by a charity, also restores and displays a number of other steam engines and pumps. The steam for the moving exhibits is provided by a Marshall portable boiler. The Westonzoyland Light Railway, a short 2 ft (610 mm) narrow-gauge railway runs the length of the site and is used to carry wood for the boiler.

== History ==
The Somerset Moors and Levels, formed from a submerged and reclaimed landscape, consist of a coastal clay belt only slightly above mean sea level, with an inland peat belt at a lower level behind it. Early attempts to control the water levels were possibly made by the Romans (although records only date from the 13th century), but were not widespread. The Domesday Book of 1086 recorded that drainage of the higher grounds was under way. In the Middle Ages, the monasteries of Glastonbury, Athelney and Muchelney were responsible for much of the drainage. Efforts to control flooding on the Parrett were recorded around 1129. In 1234, 722 acres (2.9 km^{2}) were reclaimed near Westonzoyland and, from the accounts in Glastonbury Abbey's rent books, this had increased to 972 acres (393 ha) by 1240. Flooding of adjacent moor land was partially addressed during the 13th century by the construction of a number of embankment walls to contain the Parrett. They included Southlake Wall, Burrow Wall and Lake Wall. The River Tone was diverted by the Abbot of Athelney and other land owners into a new embanked channel, joining the Parrett upstream from its original confluence.

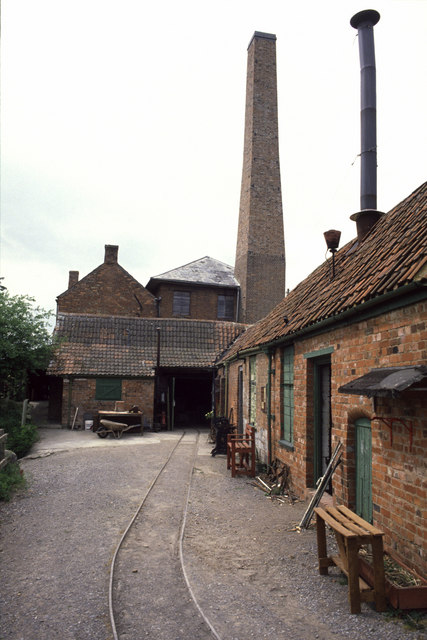
The light rail track leading to the pump house, with the forge to the right

In 1500, there was 70,000 acres (283 km^{2}) of floodable land of which only 20,000 acres (81 km^{2}) had been reclaimed. In 1597, 50 acres (20 ha) of land were recovered near the Parrett estuary; a few years later, 140 acres (57 ha) near Pawlett were recovered by means of embankments; and three further reclamations, totalling 110 acres (45 ha), had been undertaken downstream of Bridgwater by 1660. In the early 17th century, during the time of King James I, abortive plans were made to drain and enclose much of Sedgemoor, which the local Lords supported but opposed by the Commoners who would have lost grazing rights. In 1632, Charles I sold the Crown's interest in the scheme, and it was taken over by a consortium that included Sir Cornelius Vermuyden, a Dutch drainage engineer. However, the work was delayed by the English Civil War and later defeated in Parliament after local opposition. In 1638, it was reported that nearly 2,600 acres (11 km^{2}) of Tealham and Tadham Moors were not reclaimed, with a total of 30,500 acres (123.43 km^{2}) being undrained. Between 1785 and 1791, much of the lowest part of the peat moors was enclosed. In 1795, John Billingsley advocated enclosure and the digging of rhynes (a local name for drainage channels, pronounced "reens" in the east and rhyne to the west) between plots, and wrote in his Agriculture of the County of Somerset that 4,400 acres (18 km^{2}) had been enclosed in the last 20 years in Wedmore and Meare, 350 acres (1.4 km^{2}) at Nyland, 900 acres (3.64 km^{2}) at Blackford, 2,000 acres (8 km^{2}) at Mark, 100 acres (0.4 km^{2}) in Shapwick and 1,700 acres (7 km^{2}) at Westhay. Little attempt was made during the 17th and 18th centuries to pump water, possibly because the coal-driven Newcomen steam engines would have been uneconomical. It is unclear why windmills were not employed, as they were on the Fens of East Anglia, but only two examples have been recorded on the Levels: one at Bleadon at the mouth of the River Axe, where a sea wall had been built, and the other at Common Moor north of Glastonbury, which was being drained following a private act of Parliament, the Glastonbury Inclosure Act 1721 (8 Geo. 1. c. 16 Pr.).

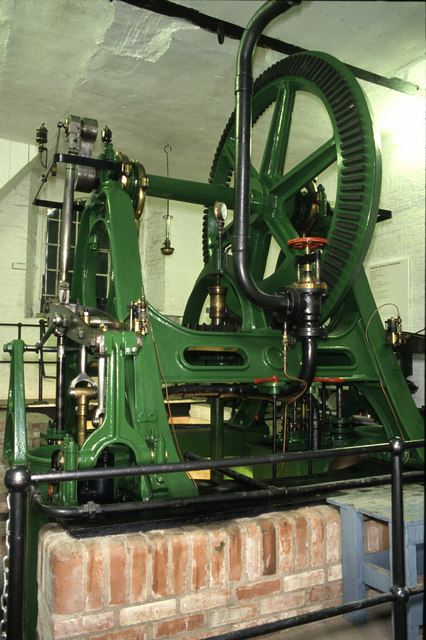
The 1861 Easton and Amos engine

The first mechanical pumping station on the Somerset Levels was built in 1830 to drain the area around Westonzoyland, Middlezoy and Othery. The success of the drainage system led to the formation of other drainage boards and the construction of other pumping stations. The pump at Westonzoyland originally comprised a beam engine and scoop wheel (like a water wheel running backwards) but, after 25 years, there were problems pumping the water away because the land had dropped as it dried out despite the wheel being raised 15 inches (380 mm) in 1843. A better method was sought, and in 1861 the present Easton and Amos pump was installed. The Westonzoyland pump lifts water from the rhyne (pronounced 'reen') into the River Parrett. The pump operated until 1951, by which time the local drainage system had been linked into King's Sedgemoor Drain, which discharged further down the River Parrett; the water levels dropped and the pump was unable to draw the water from the rhyne. Additionally, the Parrett riverbank has now been raised by some 8 feet (2.4 m) in the vicinity of the pumping station and the opening to the river, from the base of the pump-well, is now bricked up. In 1951 a diesel pump, with a capacity of 50 tons per minute, was installed by the Environment Agency in an adjacent building meaning that the steam pump was no longer needed.

The station itself is a Flemish bond brick-built property with a slate hipped roof and chimney rising to 71 feet (22 m) in height. A cottage section was added alongside it in the 1860s, to provide accommodation for the station-keeper. Originally given a Grade II listing, the property was upgraded to Grade II* by English Heritage since it is now the only surviving station that still houses a functioning engine. Beside the cottage is a long single-storey building that houses a 1914 Lancashire boiler; this was used to provide steam. Next to it is a forge, where the keeper would have made a number of his own tools. The boiler required constant running and thus consumed a good deal of coal.

=== Restoration ===
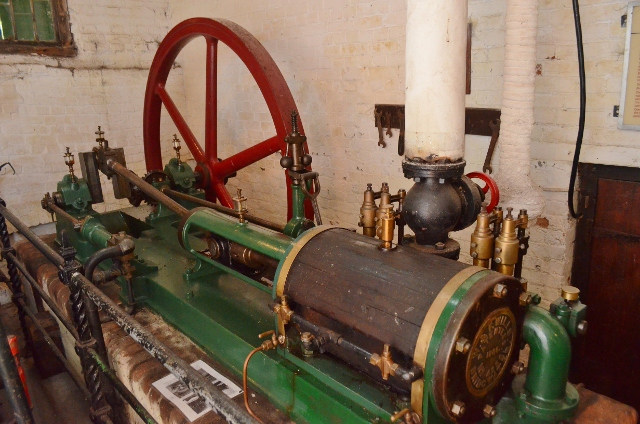
The Wills brickworks engine

In 1976, members of the Somerset Industrial Archaeology Society began restoration of the site. The Westonzoyland Engine Trust achieved charitable status in 1980 and in 1990 bought the site from the owners, Wessex Water. The structure of the engine house has been stabilised and the pump house and chimney rebuilt. A new exhibition hall has also been built.

Up until early 2010, the keeper's cottage had been off-limits to visitors. Two of the ground-floor rooms have now been opened: the living-room is furnished in a 1930s/40s style, while the old kitchen area currently holds a couple of display cases, with a view to showing hitherto unseen artefacts from the museum's collection of smaller items. The upper floors remain closed to visitors.

== Museum ==
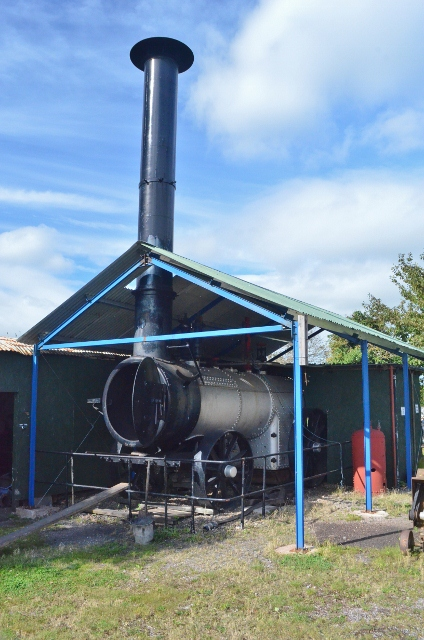
The Marshall boiler

At the western end of the site is the pump house. It houses the 1861 engine which was built by Easton and Amos of London, to a design patented in 1858 by Charles Amos. It is a twin-cylinder, vertical condensing engine, driving a centrifugal pump developed by John Appold. A similar engine was on display at The Great Exhibition of 1851 and was shown to be able to lift 100 tons of water per minute, to a height of 6 feet (1.8 m). The engine was originally powered by Cornish boilers, but these were replaced in with 1914 Lancashire boiler, with two fire tubes, made by Fred Danks. The boiler is beyond economic restoration.

In addition to the Easton and Amos pump, a collection of steam and diesel engines with connections either to the area or to pumping have been assembled on site and regular steam days are held. The oldest item dates from the early 19th century, through to several Victorian engines and onward to the 20th century. These are housed in several different buildings and areas: the exhibition hall, the courtyard, the "wiggly shed", the pump room and the engine house itself. Most of the machines are in running order, although some are still awaiting restoration.

Steam is provided by an elderly Marshall portable boiler – essentially a portable engine without the actual engine. It was built in Gainsborough, Lincolnshire in 1938 before being used by Thames Water as a stand by steam generator. It was given to Kew Bridge Steam Museum (now the London Museum of Water & Steam) before being passed on to the Westonzoyland Museum and then restored with a grant from the Preservation of Industrial and Scientific Materials Foundation (PRISM). The boiler provides steam at 50 Pounds per square inch (psi) to the other exhibits. It has been fitted with two whistles, one from Wattstown and the other from Ty Mawr Collieries in Wales, both of which were donated by the National Coal Board. Along with the boiler in the outdoor courtyard area are a waterwheel pump unit built by G. H. Harris of Wadebridge, a Lee Howl pump and Lister deep well pump.

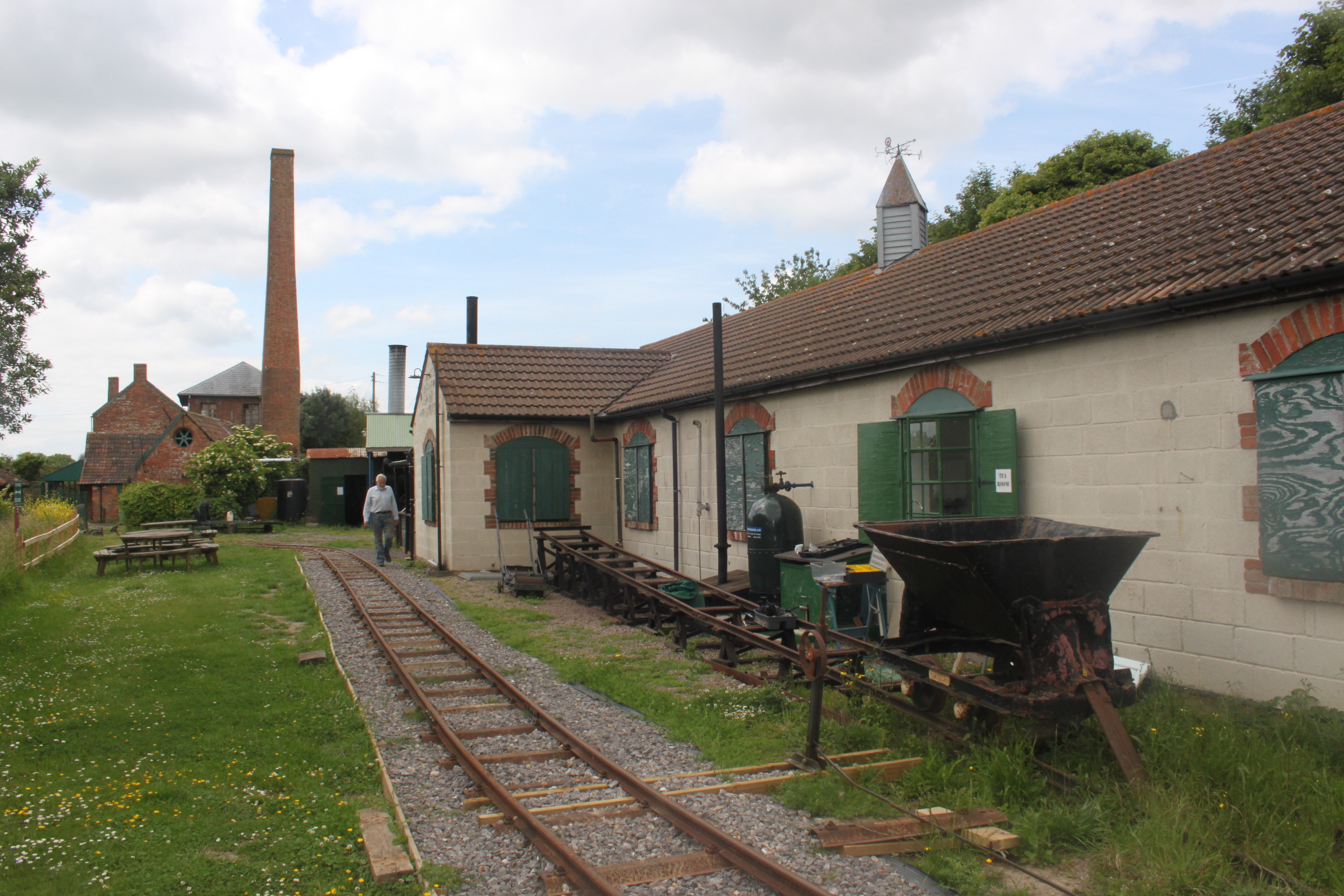
The light railway, inclined plane and exhibition hall, with the pump house and chimney in the distance.

Engines by a range of other manufacturers are on display. These include 'quick revolution' engines by Belliss and Morcom, Robey & Co., Easton and Johnson and Sissons. There are horizontal engines by W. and F. Wills and by J. Culverwell, of Bridgwater. The Culverwell machine is a horizontal single cylinder steam engine originally used in Holt's Brewery at Burnham-on-Sea, while the Wills engine was used in a brickworks.

Additional exhibits include two small de Laval steam turbines by Greenwood & Batley, and a small 'Wessex' steam turbine milk bottle washer. A winch used to move railway wagons at Hemyock Dairy near Wellington was built by J. Lynn of Sunderland. There is a runnable Crossley diesel engine dating from 1935. There is a Spirax Sarco 'Ogden pump' used to pump condensate from steam lines. The collection includes the boiler which powered the Telescopic Bridge, Bridgwater.

Westonzoyland Light Railway is a short 2 ft (610 mm) narrow-gauge railway running alongside the pumping station. It was constructed after the closure of the pumping station to move heavy machinery around the site and is used to transport timber from the wood pile to the boiler. The engines used are a Simplex diesel locomotive, built in 1968, which was previously at the Minworth Sewage Treatment Works in Sutton Coldfield and a 1949 Lister rail-truck previously used by the Eclipse Peat Company at Ashcott. A steam winch built by John Lynch of Sunderland is used to move one of the trucks up an inclined plane to demonstrate how this would have been done in goods yards and docks.

== See also ==
- Association for Industrial Archaeology
- Industrial archaeology

== Bibliography ==
- Havinden, Michael (1982). The Somerset Landscape. The making of the English landscape. Hodder and Stoughton. pp. 133–135. ISBN 978-0340201169.
- Hawkins, Desmond (1982). Avalon and Sedgemoor. Alan Sutton Publishing. ISBN 978-0862990169.
- Hollinrake, Charles; Hollinrake, Nancy (2007). "Chapter 9: The Water Roads of Somerset". In Blair, John (ed.). Waterways and Canal-Building in Medieval England. Oxford University Press. ISBN 978-0-19-921715-1.
- Miles, Iain (1993). Bogs and inundations. Somerset Industrial Archaeological Society and Westonzoyland Engine Trust. ISBN 978-0950977669.
- Otter, R. A. (1994). Civil Engineering Heritage. Institution of Civil Engineers by Thomas Telford. ISBN 978-0727719713.
- Westonzoyland Engine Trust (2014). Westonzoyland Pumping Station Museum (4 ed.). Westonzoyland Engine Trust.
- Williams, Michael (1970). The Draining of the Somerset Levels. Cambridge University Press. ISBN 978-0521074865.
- Williams, Robin; Williams, Romey (1992). The Somerset Levels. Ex Libris Press. ISBN 978-0948578380.
