= Brent Knoll Camp =

Iron Age hillfort in Somerset, England

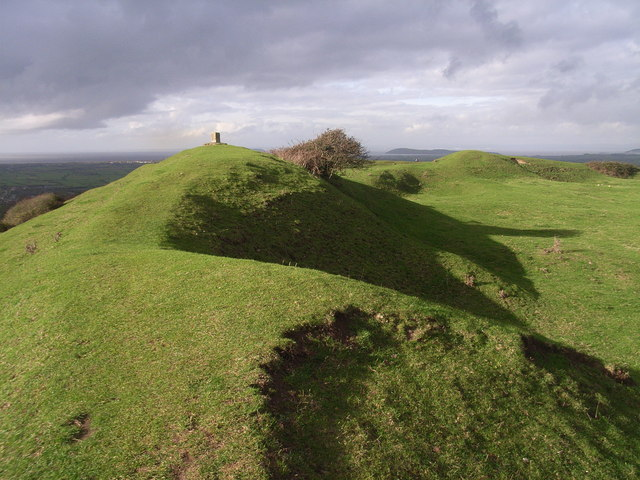

- Location within Somerset
- 51°15′15″N 2°56′44″W
- Location: Brent Knoll, Somerset, England

History
- Built: Iron Age

Site notes
- Area: 1.6 hectares (16,000 m^{2})

Scheduled monument
- Official name: Brent Knoll hillfort and associated field system
- Designated: 09 October 1981
- Reference no.: 1008248

Brent Knoll Camp is an Iron Age hillfort at Brent Knoll, 3 kilometres (1.9 mi) from Burnham-on-Sea, Somerset, England. It has been designated as a Scheduled Monument, and is now in the care of the National Trust.

The hill is 137 metres (449 ft) high dominates the low surrounding landscape of the Somerset Levels and is visible from the M5 motorway.

== Name ==
The word 'knoll' usually means a small hill or hill-top. The origin of the name Brent is unclear, but one possibility is from a word meaning burnt in Old English, suggesting that the settlement was at some time burnt by the Danes. Another proposal is that the name comes from a Celtic term meaning "high place", or even from another Celtic word, briant, meaning law, as the law was anciently promulgated from high places. Another possibility is that the name of Brent simply derives from the local river, the Brent, which gives its name to a Somerset hundred.

== Brent Knoll Hill ==
The hill consists of clays and limestone from the Jurassic era and geologically forms an outcrop of the nearby Mendip Hills.

Before the Somerset Levels were drained, Brent Knoll was an island, known as the Isle (or Mount) of Frogs, that provided a safe haven from the water and marshes. It temporarily became an island again during the Bristol Channel floods of 1607.

There is a small reservoir on the south east flank of the knoll.

== History ==
=== Bronze and Iron Ages ===
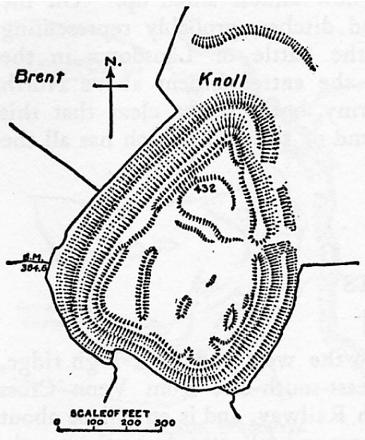
Earthworks at Brent Knoll

Brent Knoll has seen human settlement since at least the Bronze Age, becoming an Iron Age Fort about 2,000 BC, which covers an area of 1.6 hectares (16,000 m^{2}). It is defended by a single wall around 10 metres (33 ft) high and by a single ditch, with an entrance on the eastern side, with a second bank on the north east side. It is surrounded by multiple ramparts (multivallate) following the contours of the hill, however these have been heavily damaged by cattle and quarrying.

=== Roman ===
The Romans used its summit as a fortification. An urn containing coins of the Roman Emperors Trajan and Severus was found at the site before 1790. Other finds have included pennant sandstone roof tiles and painted wall plaster, indicative of a substantial building that is more likely to have been a temple than a villa. Many of the finds are in the Somerset County and Weston-super-Mare Museums, with Romano-British pottery in the Blake Museum, Bridgwater.

=== Anglo-Saxon ===
The fort has been claimed as the site of Mons Badonicus. This was a battle between a force of Britons and an Anglo-Saxon army, probably sometime between 490 and 517 AD. Though it is believed to have been a major political and military event, there is no certainty about its date or place.

It is also believed to be the site of a battle in 875 at which forces of the Anglo-Saxon kingdom of Wessex drove away the Great Heathen Army led by Guthrum, prior to the Treaty of Wedmore, which was signed three years later.

=== Medieval ===
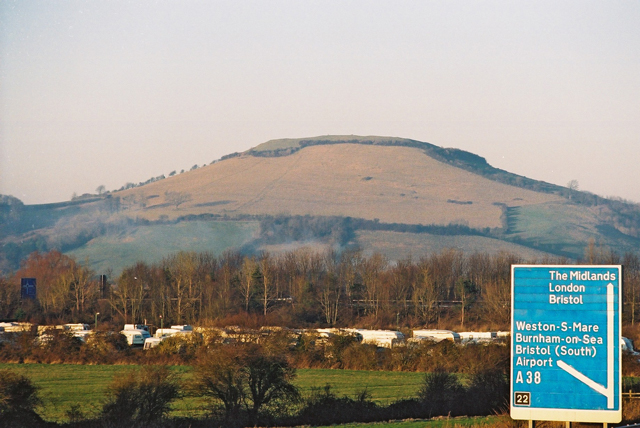
Brent Knoll with a sign on the M5 motorway

During the medieval era the local land was held by Glastonbury Abbey until the dissolution of the monasteries in 1536.

Around the sides and top of the hill are several scarps which may be medieval strip lynchets.

=== Modern era ===
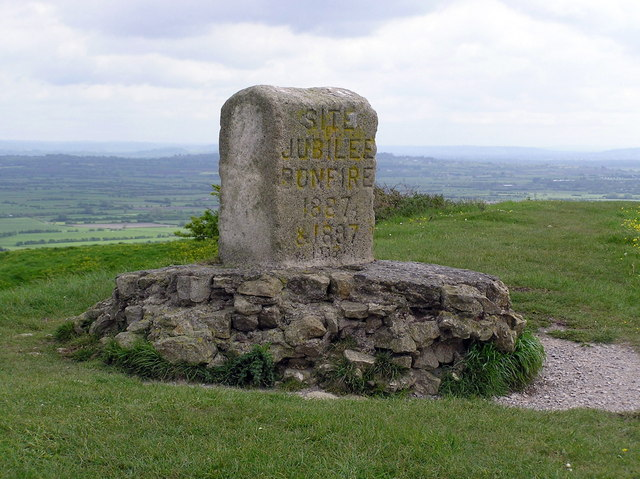
Jubilee memorial

Limestone was quarried from the knoll, possibly during the 19th century but the exact date is unknown.

During World War II it was the site of a gun emplacement manned by the Home Guard. The remains of slit trenches with angle-iron stakes can still be seen on the western and south-western sides.

In 1979, the freehold of 13.285 hectares (32.83 acres) was acquired by the National Trust from RPP Johnston.

The stone marker on the hill, which also serves as a Triangulation station, commemorates the golden jubilee of Queen Victoria.

In 2006, a resistivity survey was undertaken at the northern end of the hillfort. It showed several linear features that might be structures.

== Legend ==
According to legend, Ider son of Nuth, who was one of King Arthur's knights, came to the Mount of Frogs on a quest to slay three giants who lived there.

== See also ==
- List of hillforts and ancient settlements in Somerset
