= Brent Knoll =

Hill in Somerset, England

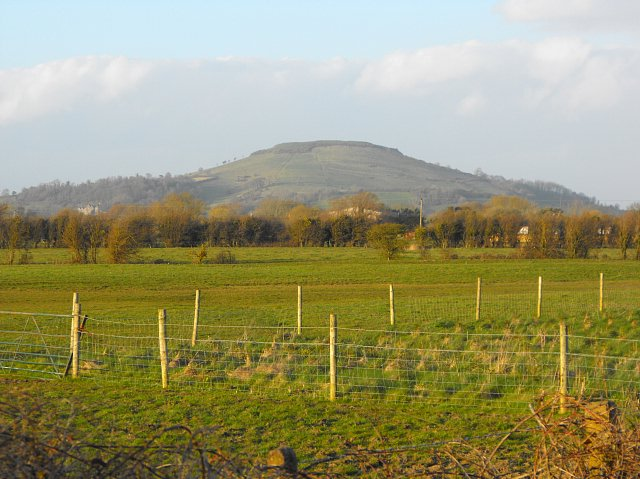

Highest point
- Prominence: 137 m (449 ft)
- Coordinates: 51°15′14″N 2°56′46″W

Geography
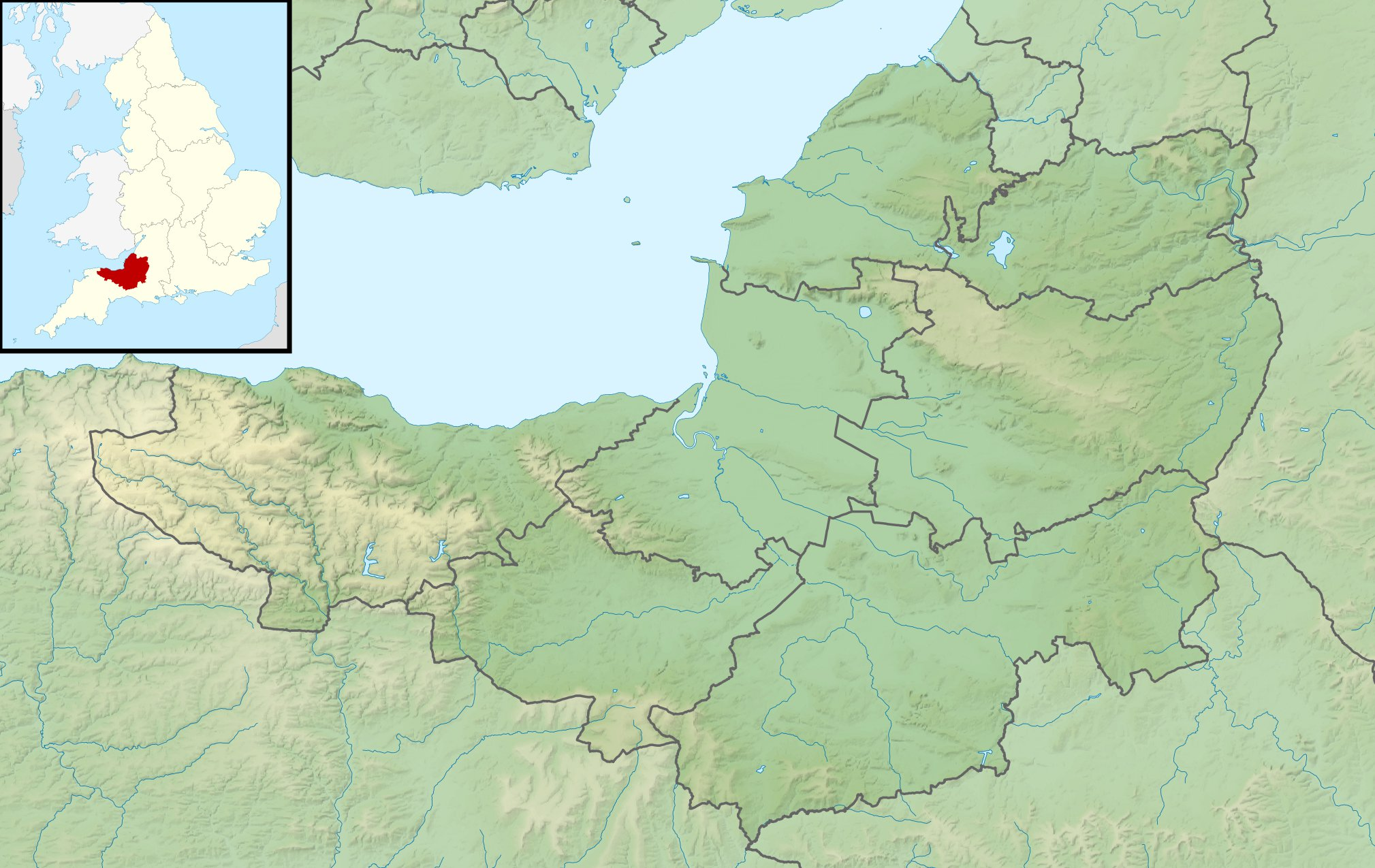
- Location within Somerset
- Location: Somerset, England
- OS grid: ST33995102
- Topo map: OS Landranger 182

Brent Knoll is a 137-metre-high (449 ft) hill on the Somerset Levels, in Somerset, England. It is located roughly halfway between Weston-super-Mare and Bridgwater, 2.5 miles (4.0 km) from the Bristol Channel coast at Burnham-on-Sea. At the foot of the hill are two villages East Brent and Brent Knoll, which takes its name from the hill but was previously called South Brent. The hill's size and isolated position on the levels mean that it dominates the landscape and can be seen for many miles, and its prominence is emphasised to travellers because the Bristol to Taunton railway line, M5 motorway, A370 and A38 roads all pass within a mile or less from its base.

== Toponymy ==
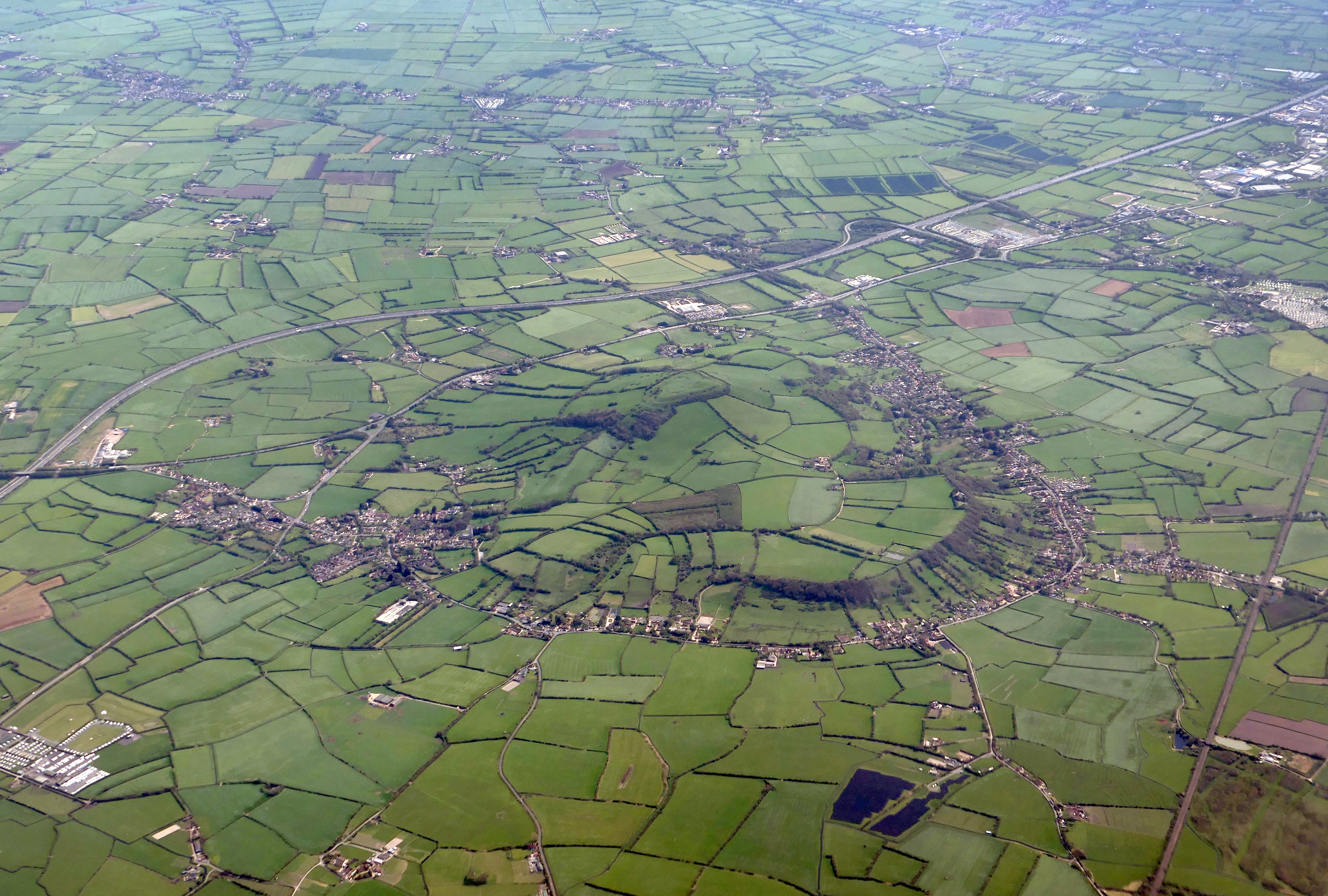
Aerial view of Brent Knoll and the surrounding Somerset Levels.

The word 'knoll' usually means a small hill or hill-top. The origin of the name Brent is unclear. The name may derive from the word "brant" meaning "steep" in Old English, although other suggestions have been put forward, such as from a word meaning burnt in Old English, suggesting that the settlement was at some time burnt by the Danes. Another proposal is that the name comes from a Celtic term meaning "high place". The modern Cornish word for "hill" being "Bre". Another possibility is that the name of Brent simply derives from the local river, the Brent, which gives its name to a Somerset hundred.

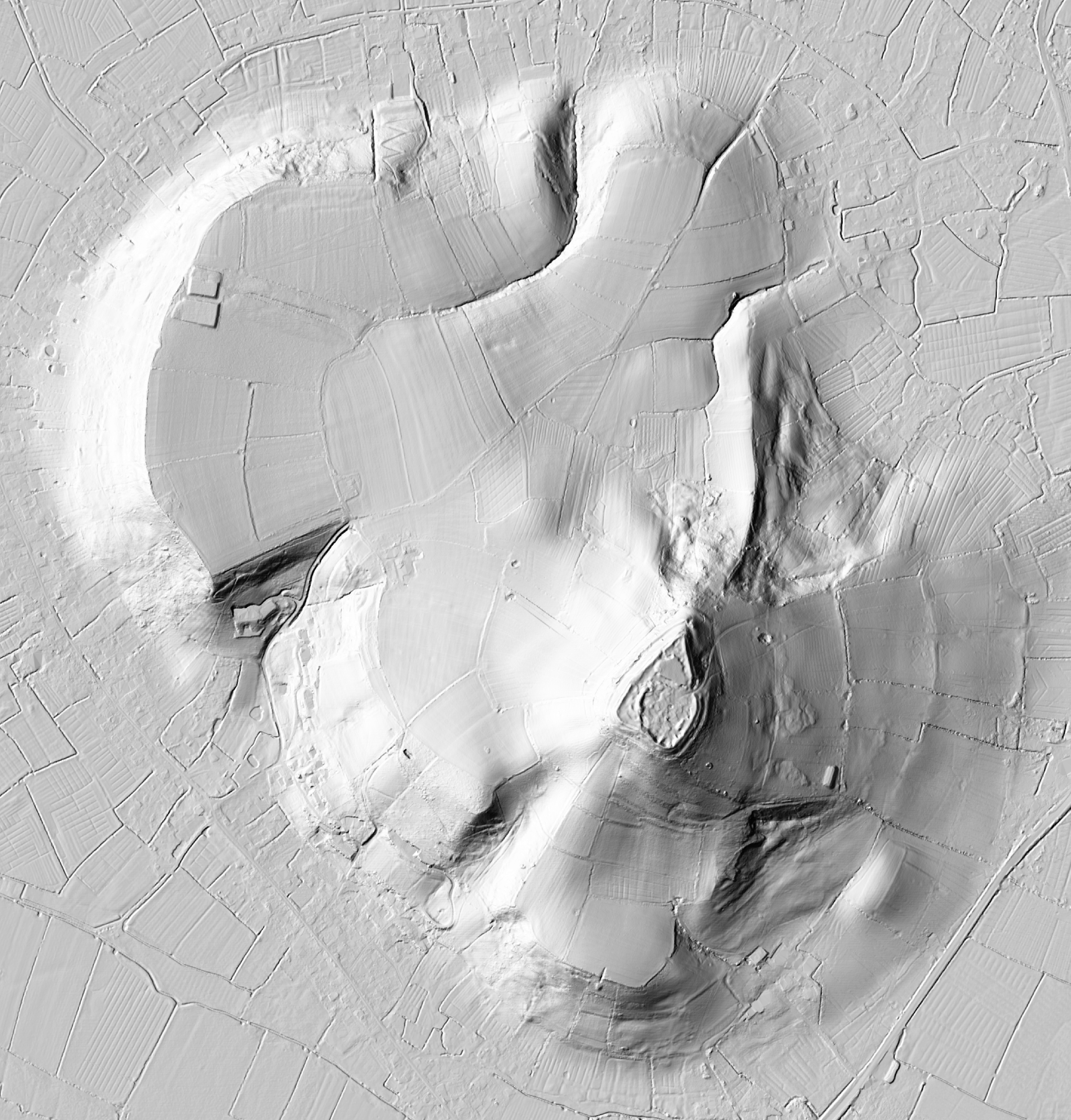
Lidar image of Brent Knoll

== Geology ==
An isolated hill, Brent Knoll is an example of denudation – waters of the Bristol Channel eroded surrounding features leaving just the Blue Lias rocks from the Jurassic period capped with Midford Sands of the Bridport Formation.

== Travel ==
Brent Knoll used to have a railway station but it closed in 1971.

== History ==
Brent Knoll has seen human settlement since at least the Bronze Age. Brent Knoll Camp is an Iron Age hill fort, with multiple ramparts (multivallate) following the contours of the hill, broken only by the main entrance on the eastern side.

Before the Somerset Levels were drained, Brent Knoll was an island, known as the Isle (or Mount) of Frogs (Mons Ranarum), that provided a safe haven from the water and marshes. According to legend, Ider son of Nuth, who was one of King Arthur's knights, came to the Mount of Frogs on a quest to slay three giants who lived there. The fort has been claimed as the site of Mons Badonicus.

== See also ==
- Geology of Somerset
