= Wembdon =

Civil parish in Somerset, England

Coordinates: 51.132°N 3.023°W

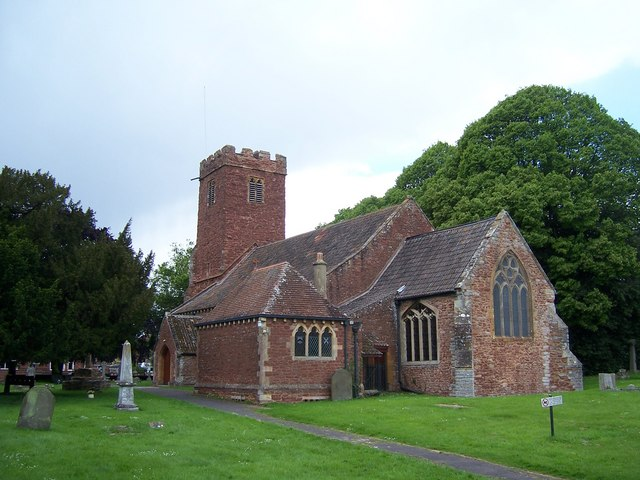
- St George's Church

- Location within Somerset
- Population: 3,613 (2011)
- OS grid reference: ST285375
- Unitary authority: Somerset Council
- Ceremonial county: Somerset
- Region: South West
- Country: England
- Sovereign state: United Kingdom
- Post town: BRIDGWATER
- Postcode district: TA6
- Dialling code: 01278
- Police: Avon and Somerset
- Fire: Devon and Somerset
- Ambulance: South Western
- UK Parliament: Bridgwater

Wembdon is a civil parish and part of the town Bridgwater in Somerset, England.

Wembdon is home to an Anglican church, a small shop (combined with the post office), a pub and a small garage.

== History ==
Wembdon was listed in the Domesday Book of 1086 as having "5 villagers and 6 smallholders with four ploughs".

The name Wembdon is believed to mean "Huntsman's Hill", referring to Wembdon Hill itself where Saxon* burials have been discovered. These are believed to be British burials which date to the Saxon period. Wembdon Hill is also the site of St. Johns Well, which was renowned for its healing powers from the 15th century onwards.

In 2002 a northern distributor road for Bridgwater was built to the south of the village to ease traffic congestion in Bridgwater town centre. The road had been part of local town planning since the 1980s, and building proceeded despite some local resistance.

== Governance ==
The parish council has responsibility for local issues, including setting an annual precept (local rate) to cover the council's operating costs and producing annual accounts for public scrutiny. The parish council evaluates local planning applications and works with the local police, district council officers, and neighbourhood watch groups on matters of crime, security, and traffic. The parish council's role also includes initiating projects for the maintenance and repair of parish facilities, as well as consulting with the district council on the maintenance, repair, and improvement of highways, drainage, footpaths, public transport, and street cleaning. Conservation matters (including trees and listed buildings) and environmental issues are also the responsibility of the council.

For local government purposes, since 1 April 2023, the village comes under the unitary authority of Somerset Council. Prior to this, it was part of the non-metropolitan district of Sedgemoor, which was formed on 1 April 1974 under the Local Government Act 1972, having previously been part of Bridgwater Rural District.

It is also part of the Bridgwater county constituency represented in the House of Commons of the Parliament of the United Kingdom. It elects one Member of Parliament (MP) by the first past the post system of election, and was part of the South West England constituency of the European Parliament prior to Britain leaving the European Union in January 2020, which elected seven MEPs using the d'Hondt method of party-list proportional representation.

== Religious sites ==
St George's Church was granted by William Testard, lord of Wembdon Manor, to St John's Hospital, Bridgwater in 1284. The church was badly damaged by fire in March 1868, and as the certificate for fire insurance had expired, had to be rebuilt with significant local aid.

== Education ==
A Church of England VC Primary school (Wembdon St. Georges) can be found in the village.

== Culture ==
Wembdon Village Day occurs towards the end of August every year, centred on competitions involving arts and crafts, fruit and vegetables, baking, jam making and wine making and many other events. It takes place on the playing field and nearby Parish centre building. A large car boot sale is also in place on the day and local radio station Quay West 107.4 conduct a live show from a stage during the event.

On the Saturday closest to 5 November, Guy Fawkes Night, a bonfire is set up on the playing field, and a fireworks display is shown during the evening.

St George's Parish Centre opposite the church is the venue for many village activities. These include Scouts and Guides, a nursery school and the meetings of the Wembdon Community Association.
