= Chandos Glass Cone =

Historic site in Somerset, England

Coordinates: 51.1315°N 3.0039°W

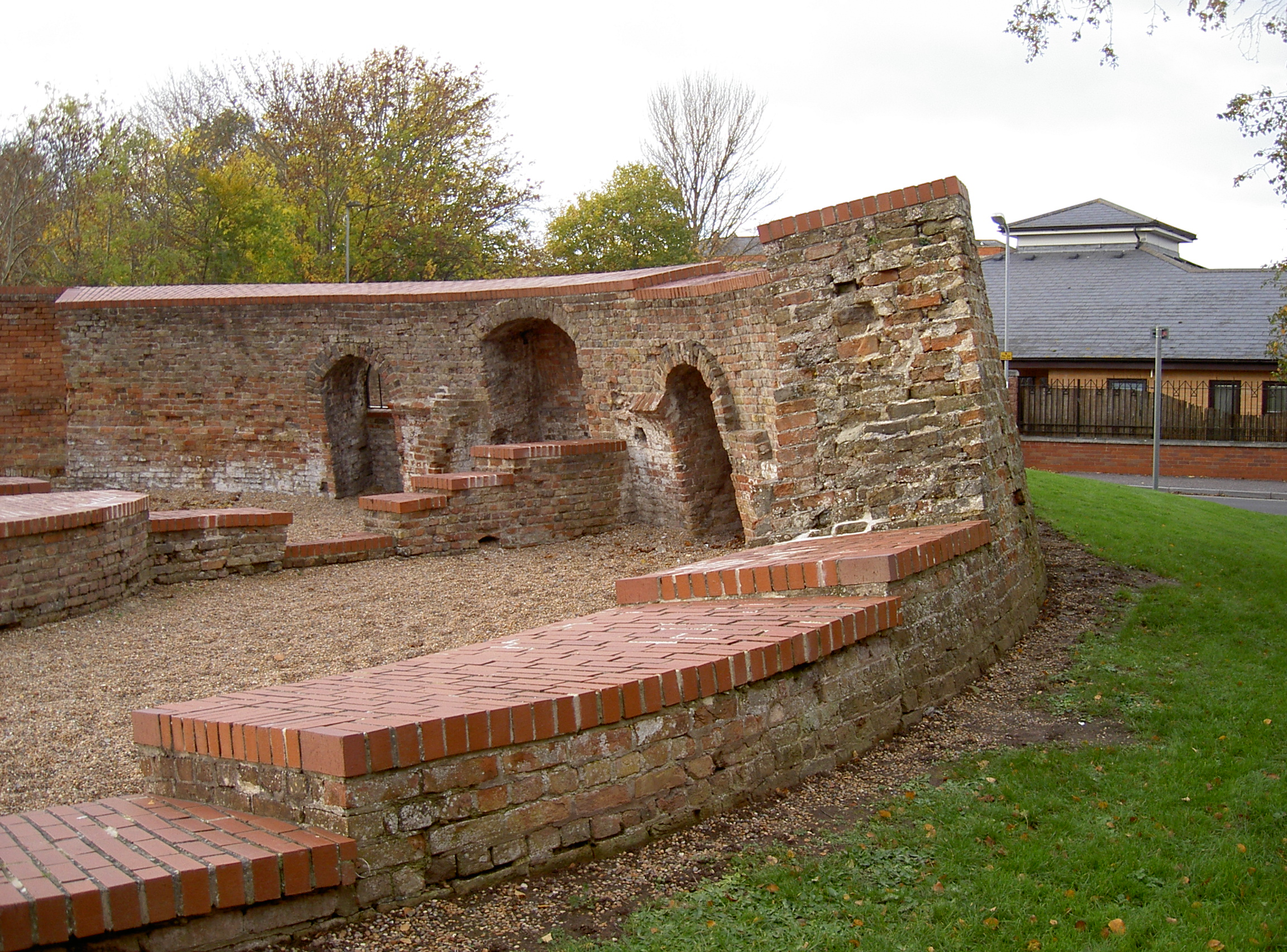
The remains of the Chandos Glass Cone

The Chandos Glass Cone in Bridgwater, in the English county of Somerset, was built in 1725 as a kiln for a glassworks. The remains have been scheduled as an ancient monument.

After a short period of use for glassmaking the kiln was converted to the production of pottery, bricks and tiles, which undertaking continued until 1939. Most of the cone of brickwork was demolished in 1943. The bottom 2.4 metres (7 ft 10 in) has been preserved.

== History ==
The cone was constructed by James Brydges, 1st Duke of Chandos as part of an industrial development close to the River Parrett, which enabled the transport of raw materials from his other enterprises at Stourbridge. Local sand was used. The cone was in use for glassmaking for but a short time. The business struggled almost from the start and was mismanaged by the Duke's local agents, who were declared bankrupt in 1728. Glass-making ceased in 1734 and then, after several years in which the cone was used as an iron foundry, it became a pottery works with three kilns installed within the cone. Between 1827 and 1939 bricks and tiles were produced in addition to pottery. In the 1870s a railway siding was built between the local and the pottery, which included the construction of the Telescopic Bridge.

The kiln was last used in 1939, and most of the structure was demolished in 1943, after the brickwork at the top of the cone had been found to have "spread". The bricks from the demolished cone were reused in the construction of runways at RAF Merryfield and RAF Weston Zoyland. Some of the pottery and glass found during an excavation of the site in the 1970s is on display at the Blake Museum in Bridgwater. In 2007 a plan was submitted to rebuild the cone in glass and steel as a visitor attraction.

== Architecture ==
The cone was 33 metres (108 ft) high and 75 feet (23 m) across at the base, however the surviving portion is only 2.4 metres (7 ft 10 in) high. The cone tapered into a bottle shape which was much narrower at the top than at the base to provide a natural draft through the structure.
