= St George's Church, Wembdon =

Church in Somerset, England

St George's Church
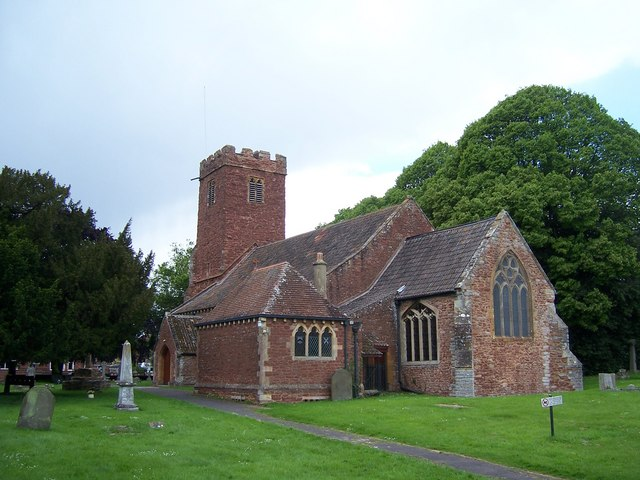

- Location within Somerset
- 51°08′11″N 3°01′02″W
- Location: Wembdon, Somerset, England

History
- Built: 14th and 15th century

Listed Building – Grade II
- Official name: Church of St George
- Designated: 29 March 1963
- Reference no.: 1237571

Listed Building – Grade II
- Official name: Churchyard Cross, in Churchyard 8 metres south of South Aisle, Church of St George
- Designated: 29 March 1963
- Reference no.: 1059052

Scheduled monument
- Official name: Churchyard cross in St George's churchyard
- Designated
- Reference no.: 1015454

Listed Building – Grade II
- Official name: Stocks, in churchyard 8 metres South of vestry, Church of St George
- Designated: 24 June 1985
- Reference no.: 1237586

The Anglican St George's Church was founded in the 13th century in the village of Wembdon within the English county of Somerset. The current building dates from the 14th and 15th century but was largely rebuilt in 1868 after a fire. It is a Grade II listed building.

== History ==
The church was granted by William Testard, lord of Wembdon Manor, to St John's Hospital, Bridgwater in 1284. The current red sandstone building was built in the 14th and 15th century in a perpendicular style with a west tower.

In the churchyard is a 15th-century churchyard cross on an octagonal base. The shaft is approximately 1.9 metres (6 ft 3 in) high; however the head of the cross is missing. It is a Grade II listed building and ancient monument. There is also a set of stocks which were probably installed in the 17th century. They were moved to their current site and restored in 1916.

The church was badly damaged by fire in March 1868, and as the certificate for fire insurance had expired, had to be rebuilt with significant local aid. The tower survived from the original building, however the rest of the structure was rebuilt to designs by J.M. Hay, which included the extension of the nave.

== Present day ==
The benefice of Wembdon is within the Sedgemoor deanery which is part of the Diocese of Bath and Wells.

St George's Church stands in the conservative evangelical tradition of the Church of England. It has passed resolutions to reject the ordination of women.

== See also ==
- List of ecclesiastical parishes in the Diocese of Bath and Wells
