= Telescopic Bridge, Bridgwater =

Bridge in Somerset, United Kingdom

Telescopic rail bridge Black Bridge
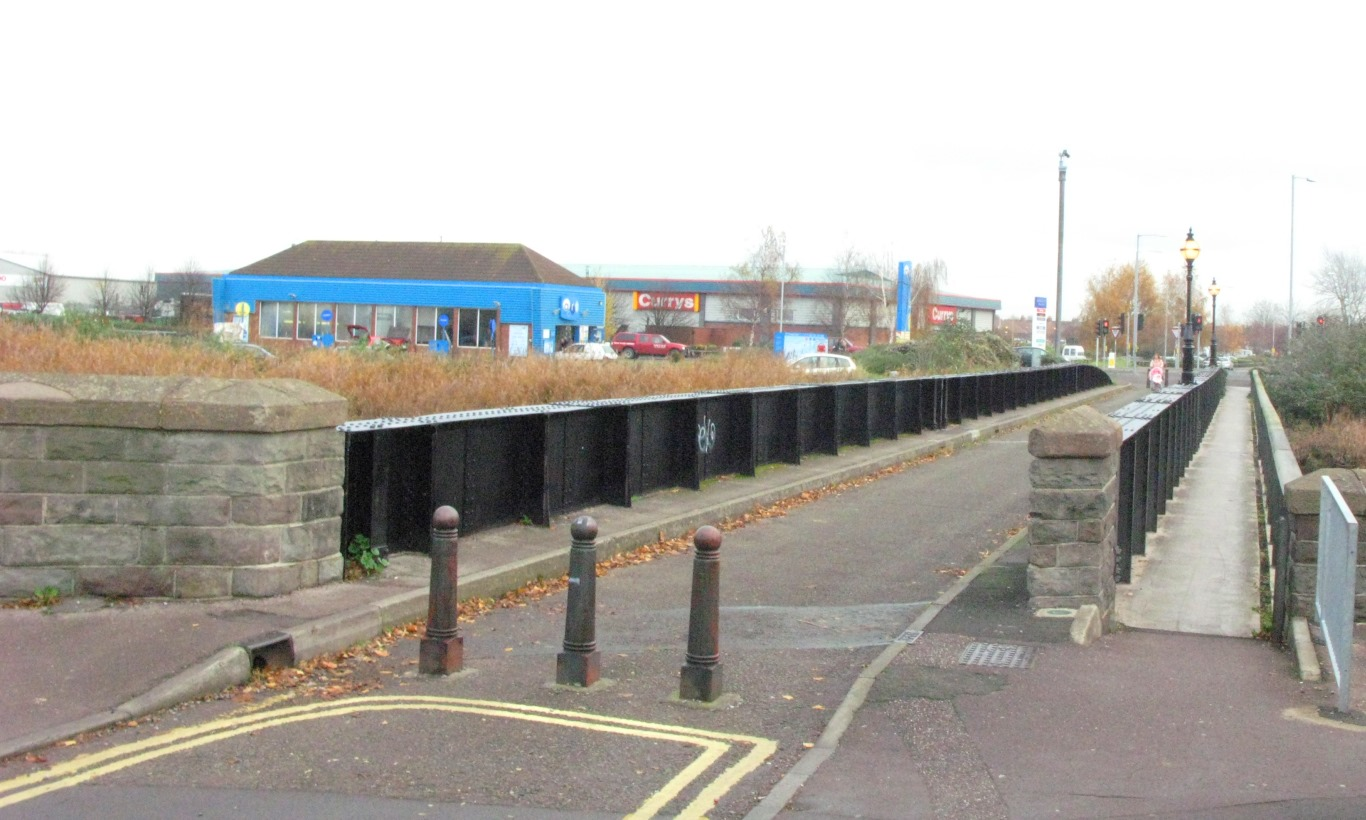
- The telescopic bridge in 2007
- Coordinates: 51.1318°N 3.0015°W
- Carries: Pedestrians
- Crosses: River Parrett
- Locale: Bridgwater, Somerset, England
- Heritage status: Grade II* listed building, ancient monument

Characteristics
- Design: Retractable bridge
- Material: Cast iron and steel

History
- Designer: Sir Francis Fox
- Opened: 1871

The Telescopic Bridge (locally known as the Black Bridge) in Bridgwater, within the English county of Somerset, was built in 1871 to carry a railway over the River Parrett. It has been scheduled as an ancient monument and is a Grade II* listed building.

The retractable bridge was built in 1871 to the design of Sir Francis Fox, the engineer for the Bristol and Exeter Railway. It carried a railway siding over the river to the coal yard and docks in the Port of Bridgwater, but had to be movable, to allow boats to proceed upriver to the Town Bridge. Part of the railway siding followed the route previously used by a horse-drawn tram which had later been converted to a mixed gauge rail system. An 80-foot (24 m) section of railway track to the east of the bridge could be moved sideways by a traverser, making space so that the main 127-foot (39 m) girders could be retracted, creating a navigable channel which was 78 feet (24 m) wide. It was manually operated for the first eight months, and then powered by a steam engine, reverting to manual operation in 1913, when the steam engine failed. The Bristol and Exeter Railway, including the branch line and bridge, was taken over by the Great Western Railway in 1876.

The bridge was temporarily immobilised during World War II and last opened in 1953, and the traverser section was demolished in 1974, but public outcry at the action resulted in the bridge being listed as a Scheduled Ancient Monument, and the rest of the bridge was kept. It was later used as a road crossing, until the construction of the Chandos road bridge alongside it, and is now only used by pedestrians. Parts of the steam engine were moved to Westonzoyland Pumping Station Museum in 1977, and other parts of the bridge mechanism to Didcot Railway Centre.
