= Stowey Castle =

Ruined castle in Somerset, England

- Somerset, England
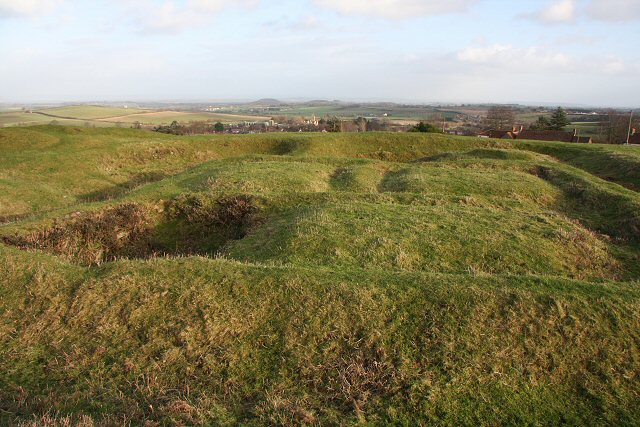
- Stowey Castle

Site information
- Type: Motte and bailey
- Condition: Earthworks remain

Location
- Shown within Somerset
- Coordinates: 51.1490°N 3.1637°W
- Grid reference: grid reference ST187395

Stowey Castle (or Nether Stowey Castle known locally as The Mount) was a Norman motte-and-bailey castle, built in the 11th century, in the village of Nether Stowey on the Quantock Hills in Somerset, England. It has been designated as a Scheduled Monument, the foundations of the keep are also a Grade I listed building.

== Details ==
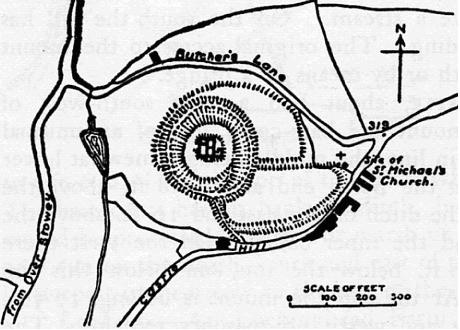
Map of the castle site

The Castle is sited on a small isolated knoll of Leighland Slates of the Devonian series, about 390 feet (119 m) high. It consisted of a square keep, (which may have been stone, or a wooden superstructure on stone foundations) and its defences, and an outer and an inner bailey. The mount is 29 feet (9 m) above the 6 feet (2 m) wide ditch which itself is 7 feet (2 m) deep. The motte has a flat top. The central area is occupied by approximately square foundations 33 feet (10 m) by 33 feet (10 m), with internal divisions.

Alfred of Spain (who was actually from Épaignes in Normandy) is the Norman Lord of Stowey as recorded in the Domesday Book of 1086; the building of the castle is normally attributed to him or to his daughter Isabel. The earliest written reference to the castle is in a forged charter of 1154.

The top of the motte was excavated by amateurs in the 19th century but no record was made of any finds. The mounds around the top of the motte are assumed to be spoil heaps from these excavations to clear the foundations of the keep, although it has also been suggested that they may be the remains of towers. The blue lias rubble foundations are the only visible structural remains of the castle, which stood on the conical motte surrounded by a ditch approximately 820 feet (250 m) in circumference.

The castle was destroyed in the 15th century, which may have been as a penalty for the local Lord Audley's involvement in the Second Cornish Uprising of 1497 led by Perkin Warbeck. Some of the stone was used in the building of Stowey Court in the village.

== See also ==
- Castles in Great Britain and Ireland
- List of castles in England
