= Ivelchester and Langport Navigation =

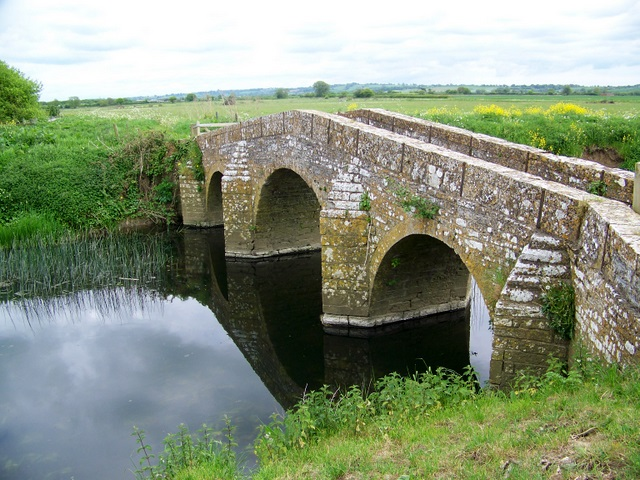
- Pill Bridge, the packhorse bridge that crosses the Yeo at Ilchester

Specifications
- Status: never completed

History
- Date of act: 1795

Geography
- Start point: Ilchester
- End point: Langport
- Connects to: River Parrett

The Ivelchester and Langport Navigation was a scheme to make the River Ivel (now called the River Yeo) navigable from Langport to Ilchester, in Somerset, England. Work started in 1795, but the scheme was effectively bankrupt by 1797, and construction of the locks was never completed.

== History ==
Ilchester was a Roman garrison town, built at the point where the Fosse Way crossed the River Ivel, and there is evidence that the Romans built quays on the river. There are mentions of boats using the river in the 13th century, and in a survey carried out in 1632 by Gerard. However, the Ivel was never a large river, and when there was inadequate water to reach Ilchester, goods were unloaded at Pill Bridge, which crossed the river 1.5 miles (2.4 km) downstream from the town. All goods moving from that bridge to the town had to pay tolls to the Borough of Ilchester, which increased the price of coal to the inhabitants. Navigation was also hampered by the restrictive size of the medieval bridge arch at Langport. The Ivelchester and Langport Navigation was conceived as a way of ensuring that boats could always reach the Ilchester town wharfs, and therefore duty would not be paid on goods using Pill Bridge Lane.

=== Construction ===
Following a meeting with representatives from the Dorset and Somerset Canal, which was part of a grand scheme to link the Bristol Channel to the English Channel, a number of local businessmen obtained an Act of Parliament on 22 June 1795, which made provision for improving the river between Ilchester and Bicknell Bridge, just to the south east of Langport, and then cutting through the town along the course of the Portlake Rhine, which was then a drain, and rejoining the River Parrett below Langport lock. The act allowed the proprietors to raise £6,000 by issuing shares, and a further £2,000 in loans, if required.

Around three quarters of the share capital had been promised before the act was obtained, and so work commenced immediately. The plans involved widening the Portlake Rhine, building a lock close to the Little Bow bridge, near the centre of the town, and making a cut to join the River Parrett again near Bicknell's Bridge, which would include two more locks. A further four locks were to be constructed between there and Ilchester. The engineer was a local man called Josiah Easton, and good progress was made in the first six months at the Langport end of the scheme, but costs were escalating, and by October 1796, the scheme was in difficulty. The £6,000 of share capital had all been spent, but little work had been done on removing shoals from the river towards Ilchester. In 1797, outstanding debts were cleared and the scheme was effectively abandoned.

=== The Parrett Navigation Act ===
Despite the scheme not being finished, some traffic continued to use the river. The Parrett Navigation Act, which was obtained in 1836, authorised improvements to the River Parrett below Langport, the construction of a canal to Westport, and the rebuilding of the Great Bow Bridge, to allow larger boats to travel beyond Langport. Normal canal tolls were charged for use of the canal, and there was a toll for trade passing under the rebuilt bridge,Body & Gallop 2006, p. 13 but some of the shareholders felt that boat users on the River Ivel should also be charged, since the water levels on the river had improved since the construction of the Parrett Navigation works.

Accordingly, Nicholas Broadmead, who was a solicitor, and Philip Broadmead, both of whom were shareholders in the Parrett Navigation Company, set about tracing and buying the 120 shares of the original Ivelchester and Langport Canal Company. Philip Broadmead obtained professional opinions on the legality of the proposed action, and produced a document outlining the expected returns on such a scheme. Some shares were obtained, and a meeting was held on 26 September 1843 at the Castle Inn in Ilchester, but the outcome is not known, as the plan faded away, and the planned resurrection of the company did not occur.

== Today ==
Little remains of the Navigation. The course of the Portlake Rhine and the channel from Bicknell's Bridge to Little Bow bridge can be made out in the landscape, but navigation on the Parrett as a whole has largely ceased because the locks have been replaced by sluices.

== Route and points of interest ==
Point	Coordinates (Links to map resources)	OS Grid Ref	Notes
Bow Bridge	51.036°N 2.835°W	ST415266	Langport
River Parrett junction	51.030°N 2.825°W	ST422260	River Parrett
Long Load Bridge	51.008°N 2.763°W	ST465234	Long Load
Wharves	51.001°N 2.68°W	ST522226	Ilchester

== Bibliography ==
- Body, G.; Gallop, R. (2006). Parrett River Trade. Fiducia Press. ISBN 978-0-946217-25-0.
- Priestley, Joseph (1831). "Historical Account of the Navigable Rivers, Canals, and Railways of Great Britain". Archived from the original on 4 March 2016.

== See also ==
- Canals of Great Britain
- History of the British canal system
