= Warehouse, Langport =

Warehouse in Langport, Somerset, England

Coordinates: 51°2′12″N 2°50′3″W

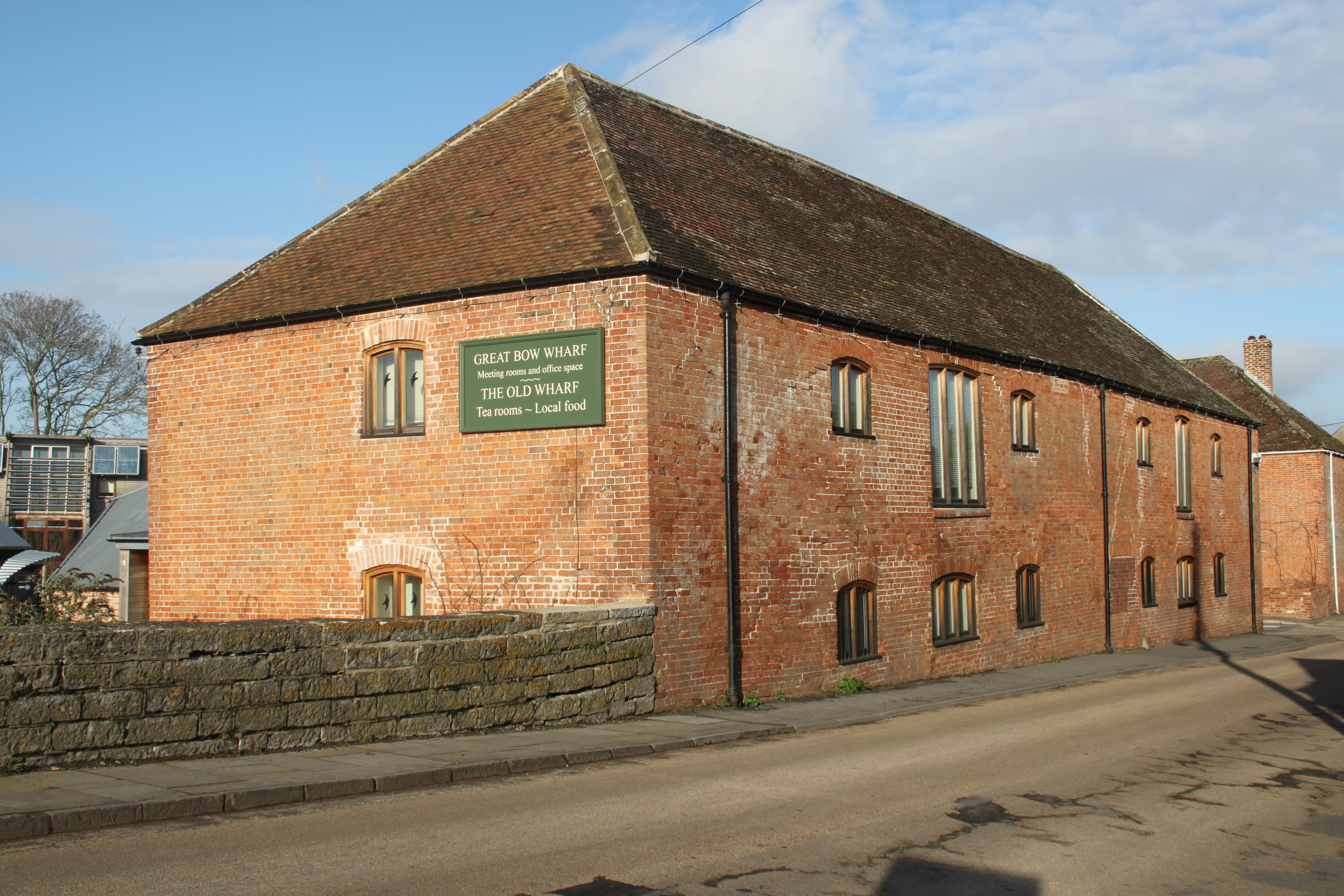
The warehouse in Great Bow Yard

The Warehouse in Great Bow Yard Langport, Somerset, England is an example of Victorian industrial architecture.

The Warehouse was built in the late 18th century of English bond red brick, with Flemish bond extensions. It has clay plain tile roofs with hipped ends. It was built by the Parrett Navigation Company, a trading Company owned by Vincent Stuckey and Walter Bagehot, on the banks of the River Parrett. When the river became unnavigable the buildings usefulness waned and was eventually abandoned.

The Somerset Trust for Sustainable Development, now the Ecos Trust, purchased the site, designated as a brown field site, in February 2003, and worked with Somerset Buildings Preservation Trust (SBPT), English Heritage and local councils to redevelop it into a craft, heritage learning and small business centre, with the surrounding land being used for an eco-friendly housing development.

It is a grade II listed building.
