= Westport Canal =

Canal in Somerset, England

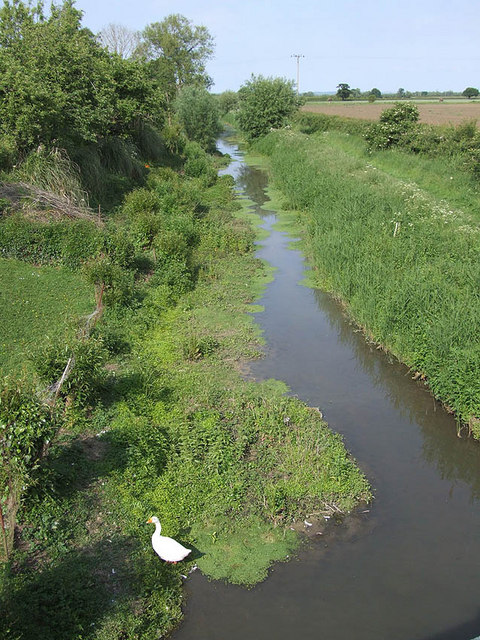
- The derelict Westport Canal near Westport.

Specifications
- Locks: 1 + a flood gate
- Status: Derelict

History
- Original owner: Parrett Navigation Company
- Principal engineer: William Gravatt
- Date of act: 1836
- Date of first use: 1840
- Date closed: 1875

Geography
- Start point: Westport
- End point: Muchelney
- Branch of: River Parrett

The Westport Canal was built in the late 1830s to link Westport and Langport in Somerset, England. It was part of a larger scheme involving improvements to the River Parrett above Burrow Bridge. Langport is the point at which the River Yeo joins the River Parrett and the intention was to enable trade via the port at Bridgwater. It remained in use until the 1870s, but closed when the Somerset Drainage Commissioners took over control of the River Parrett. Despite a petition against closure by local people, the Commissioners ruled that navigation of the canal must cease due to their interpretation of the Act which gave them control of it, leaving the canal to serve as a drainage channel since 1878.

The channel has survived to the modern day due to its drainage function, and many of the structures associated with the canal can still be seen. A number of them are on the listed building register because of their historic importance. There is some interest in improving the canal for its amenity value.

== History ==
By the 1830s, the village of Westport was well-connected to the surrounding area, as a result of turnpike road construction in 1753, 1759 and 1823. The roads linked Westport to Ilminster and Chard, which were also on the planned route of the Chard Canal. Although that canal would link the towns to Taunton, those planning the Westport Canal made approaches to the Chard Canal proprietors about the possibility of a link from Westport to the new canal, but this was rejected.

Against this background, and having engaged Isambard Kingdom Brunel as engineering consultant, the construction of the Westport Canal was authorised by an Act of Parliament obtained in 1836. The Act gave the newly formed Parrett Navigation Company powers to raise £10,500 by the issuing of shares, and an additional £3,300 from a mortgage if required. The canal was part of a bigger scheme; the act authorised improvements to the River Parrett between Burrow Bridge and Langport, rebuilding of the river bridge at Langport, which had obstructed navigation up-river from there for many years, and construction of the canal to Westport. The scheme was supported by two local landowners, the Trevillian family and the Combe family, and so obtaining land for the route was not difficult.

On Brunel's recommendation, the engineer for the whole scheme was William Gravatt, who had previously worked with Brunel on the Bristol and Exeter Railway, and he was assisted locally by Charles Hodgkinson. The cost of the initial work on the River Parrett exceeded the budget, and a second Act of Parliament was obtained in 1839, to allow the company to raise another £20,000 and to increase the tolls. Local merchants sought to oppose the increase by opposing the bill, but Benjamin Lovibond, who was acting for them at the House of Commons, produced a petition, which was investigated by a Select Committee and found to be forged.

The route from Langport followed the River Parrett to its junction with the River Isle. Here a lock was built, to maintain the water levels on the River Isle, and about one mile (1.6 km) further upstream, the 2.3-mile (3.7 km) canal turned off towards Westport, where five wharfs and a basin were built. A half lock at the junction protected the canal from high river levels. Gravatt is known to have designed an innovative set of flood gates as part of the project, which were described as "self-acting". The canal was officially opened on 20 May 1839, but there were complains about water levels from some of the merchants, and further work was required to remove shoals in the river section. The project was completed in 1840, and was initially profitable. The Westport terminus gained two warehouses, a coal yard owned by Stukey and Bagehot, and a manager's office. Despite the opening of the Chard canal in 1842, Stukey and Bagehot's boats alone paid tolls on 10,402 tons of goods in 1843. The main cargoes were coal, which was brought to the villages served by the canal, and grain, which was exported via the canal. Other cargoes included incoming timber, which was stored in one of the warehouses for seasoning, together with outgoing stone and reeds.

However, competition arrived in the form of the Durston to Yeovil Railway, started in 1847 and completed in 1853. The six years prior to 1853 had all shown receipts in excess of £1,400, but these had dropped to £673 by 1857 and £347 by 1871. Major clearance work to remove reeds and mud was required in 1858, which caused the canal to trade at a loss. A railway through Ilminster and Chard opened in 1866, and trade continue to move from the canal to the railway. In 1875 there was flooding in Westmoor, and local landowners opened Langport Lock on the River Parrett, as the company could not afford to repair a broken culvert which carried drainage water under the river. With the lock open, no tolls could be charged, and the Somersetshire Drainage Bill was amended to allow the Somerset Drainage Commissioners to take over the whole of the River Parrett Navigation at no cost. The Bill became an Act of Parliament on 1 July 1878. Although the Act made provision for closing any of the navigations which came under their control, they took it to mean that all navigations must be closed. Users of the Westport Canal presented a petition requesting that the canal be retained in 1880, but were instructed that the Drainage Commissioners had no powers to allow this to happen. The canal was effectively abandoned as a navigation from 1875, and used as a drain for the Somerset levels from 1878.

== Today ==
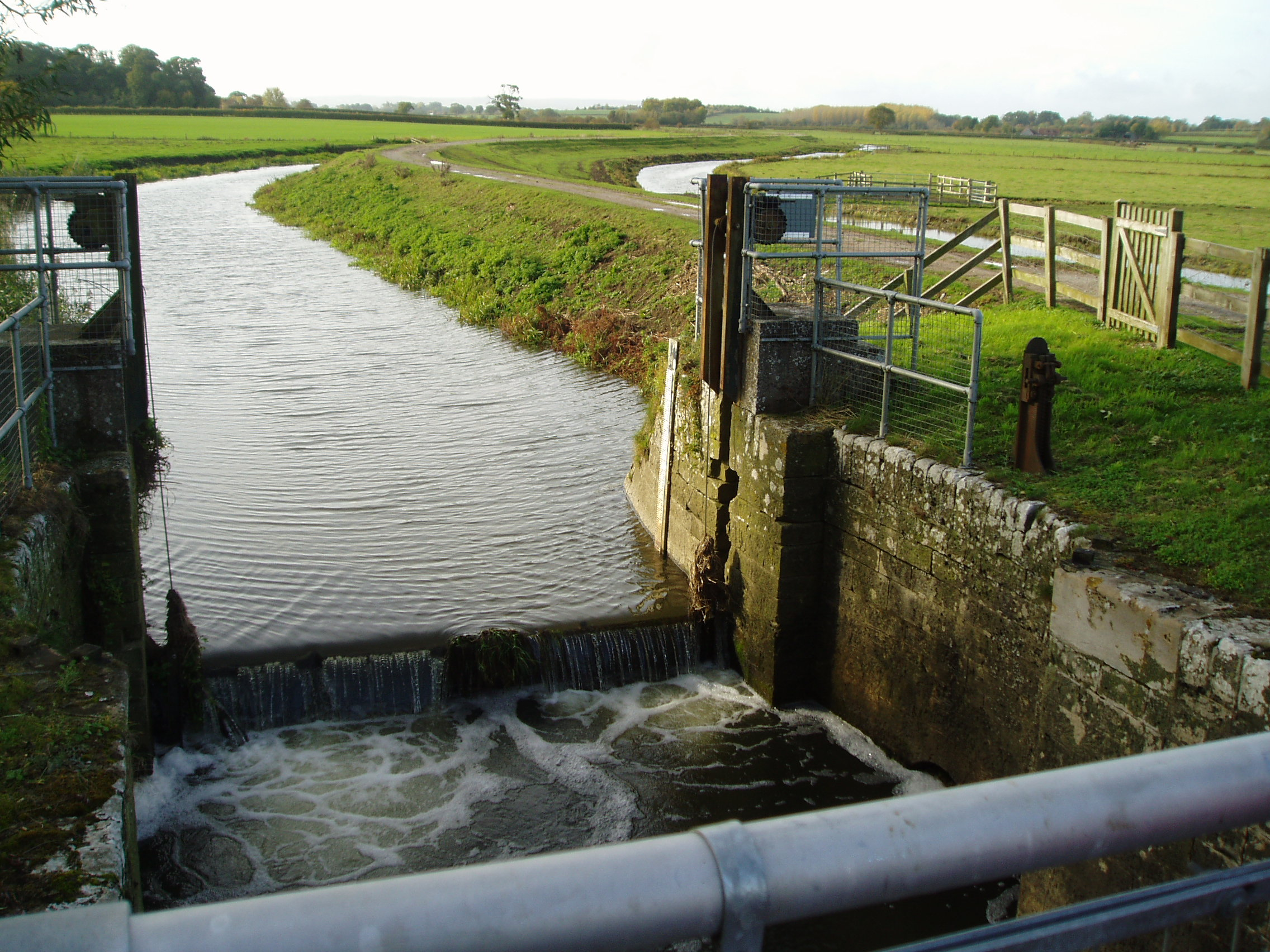
The remains of Midelney lock. Beyond the towpath is the Southmoor main drain.

The canal still contains water, and can be navigated by light craft such as canoes, which can be portaged at Midelney lock. Some refurbishment of the canal was carried out by Wessex Water Authority in the 1970s. Midelney lock is derelict, and the Westmoor Lane bridge at Hambridge has been lowered. The bridge at the entrance to Westport wharfs has been refurbished, as have the terminal warehouse buildings. There is local interest in improving the canal as an amenity, and possibly the restoration of navigation for small boats.

== Route ==
The canal terminated at Westport, and there are a number of structures which have survived. The square, 3-storey warehouse which was built in 1836 and fronted onto the basin is grade II listed, although part of it is now used as a house. The timber store, which was also built in 1836, has found new use as an industrial workshop, while two semi-detached cottages, used by canal workers, still occupy a site near the canal basin entrance. The bridge at the basin entrance, which carries a track called Barrington Broadway over the canal, was built of lias and ham stone with a single segmental arch. A little further downstream, an almost identical bridge carries Knighton Drove over the canal. The B3168 Westport to Curry Rivel road has run along the west bank since Westport, but soon the road and canal part. A footbridge carries the towpath over to the east bank, and the canal passes to the east of Hambridge.

Near Hambridge, the towpath crosses back to the west bank, after which Westmoor bridge crosses. This has been lowered, and would prevent navigation. A little before the River Isle joins from the west, Middlemoor bridge carries the towpath back onto the east bank, where it remains until Midelney Bridge, another grade II listed structure, which carries a minor road to Midelney Manor, a grade I listed house built on what was once an island owned by Muchelney Abbey. Much of it is sixteenth century, with some nineteenth century additions. Below the bridge, the Southmoor main drain runs parallel to the channel, with the towpath sandwiched between the two on the western bank. Finally it reaches the derelict Midelney lock. Close by is Midelney pumping station, which was built in the 1960s at the head of Westmoor main drain.

Point	Coordinates (Links to map resources)	OS Grid Ref	Notes
River Parrett Junction	51.009°N 2.832°W	ST417235	Rivers Isle and Parrett
Midelney Lock	51.008°N 2.834°W	ST416234	disused
Westport Canal start	51.000°N 2.850°W	ST404226	Junction with River Isle
Westmoor bridge	50.990°N 2.853°W	ST401215	lowered
Westport wharfs	50.975°N 2.878°W	ST384194	

== Bibliography ==
- Body, G; Gallop, R (2006). Parrett River Trade. Fiducia Press. ISBN 978-0-946217-25-0.
- Cross-Rudkin, Peter; et al. (2008). A Biographical Dictionary of Civil Engineers in Great Britain and Ireland: Vol 2: 1830 to 1890. Thomas Telford. ISBN 978-0-7277-3504-1.
- Cumberlidge, Jane (2009). Inland Waterways of Great Britain, 8th Ed. Imray Laurie Norie and Wilson. ISBN 978-1-84623-010-3.
- Dunning, Robert (1983). A History of Somerset. Chichester: Phillimore & Co. ISBN 978-0-85033-461-6.
- Hadfield, Charles (1967). The Canals of South West England. David & Charles. ISBN 978-0-7153-4176-6.
- Russell, Ronald (1971). Lost Canals of England and Wales. Newton Abbot: David & Charles. ISBN 978-0-7153-5417-9.
