= William Gravatt =

British engineer

William Gravatt FRS
- Born: 14 July 1806; Gravesend, Kent, England
- Died: 30 May 1866 (aged 59); Westminster, London
- Occupations: Mechanical and Civil engineer
- Years active: 1821–1866
- Known for: Thames Tunnel, Calder and Hebble Navigation, South Eastern Railway to Dover, Dumpy level, Bristol and Exeter Railway, Craig telescope, Difference engine

William Gravatt FRS (14 July 1806 – 30 May 1866), was an English civil engineer and scientific instrument maker.

Apprenticed as a mechanical engineer in London from aged 15, after interview he worked with Sir Marc Isambard Brunel on the Thames Tunnel, and then designed bridges for the Calder and Hebble Navigation. Whilst surveying the route for the South Eastern Railway to Dover, he devised the more transportable dumpy level, which is now universally employed. He then supervised the northern engineering team under Isambard Kingdom Brunel on the Bristol and Exeter Railway, where the deployment of his "curve of sines" theorem speeded construction. Dismissed from the project in 1841, after losing money during the railway mania period, Gravatt helped to construct both the Craig telescope and a copy of the Difference machine, distinguishing himself in a number of papers submitted to the Institution of Civil Engineers. He died after being accidentally poisoned by an overdose of morphine by his nurse.

== Early life ==
Born in Gravesend, Kent on 14 July 1806, he was the son of Colonel William Gravatt, the Assistant Inspector of the Royal Military Academy, Woolwich. At age 15, his father negotiated an apprenticeship to mechanical engineer Bryan Donkin. During this period he met and became friends with John Smeaton, Edward Troughton and Dr. George Wollaston.

== Career ==
Gravatt joined the Institution of Civil Engineers as an Associate in 1826, and in 1828 was elected a member, following his proposal based on the "curve of sines" for use on defining track transition curves on railways. In 1832 he became a FelIow of the Royal Society, and a Fellow of the Royal Astronomical Society.

=== Thames Tunnel ===
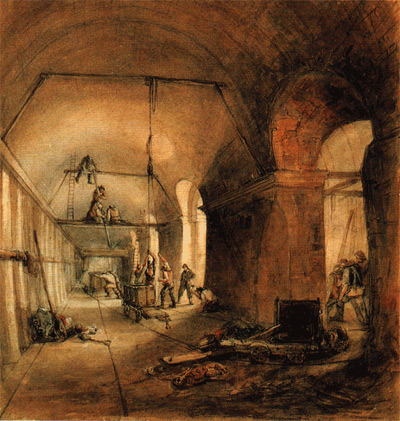
Inside the Thames Tunnel during construction, 1830

Before he finished his apprenticeship, Gravatt successfully interviewed with Sir Marc Isambard Brunel, and was given a job as a supervisor on the Thames Tunnel.

On 27 June 1827, after the tunnel flooded, Isambard Kingdom Brunel forbade anyone from entering the workings. However, company directors Robert Marten and Richard Harris insisted Gravatt take them in to inspect the damage, accompanied by two miners as crew for a dinghy. Whilst in the workings, Marten attempted to move forward in the dinghy, and after striking his head on the tunnel, tipped the boat over in 12 feet (3.7 m) of water. Only Gravatt and miner Dowling could swim, and after rescuing Marten and Harris, Gravatt was joined by Brunel in the search underwater for the second miner Richardson. Joined by officials from the Humane Society, they eventually recovered the body with a drag-line. On 5 March 1828, silver medals were voted by the Royal Humane Society to Brunel and Gravatt "for having hazarded their own lives to preserve those of their fellow-creatures."

=== Calder and Hebble Navigation ===
In 1832 during a break in work on the Thames Tunnel due to water ingress, Donkin recommended Gravatt as Engineer to the Calder and Hebble Navigation. Gravatt resultantly designed the arches for several bridges, using a solid iron-plate inverted arched chain above the platform, creating the forerunner of the suspension bridge. However, early in the start of construction Gravatt was dismissed on grounds of experience. He was replaced by William Bull.

=== Works with Isambard Kingdom Brunel ===
Commissioned by Mr. H.R. Palmer in examining the original scheme for the South Eastern Railway's route from London to Dover, during the works Gravatt devised the more transportable dumpy level, which is now universally employed.

In 1834, he was employed by Brunel on a number of works. His major project was to survey the Taff Vale Railway, from Cardiff to Merthyr Tydfil and onwards to Dowlais. He was also asked to design several bridges for both the mainline and extensions to the Great Western Railway.

In 1835, Brunel appointed Gravatt superintendent of the 75 miles (121 km) of surveys for the Act of Parliament for the Bristol and Exeter Railway. With Brunel subsequently appointed Chief construction engineer, he appointed Gravatt supervisor for the section between Bristol and White Ball, Somerset, with William Froude supervising the section from White Ball to Exeter, Devon. Brunel himself was in charge of the design of White Ball Tunnel. Through having from the outset deployed his own "curve of sines" mathematical theorem in his original surveys, the final laid operational lines did not deviate from the original drawings by more than 10 yards (9.1 m).

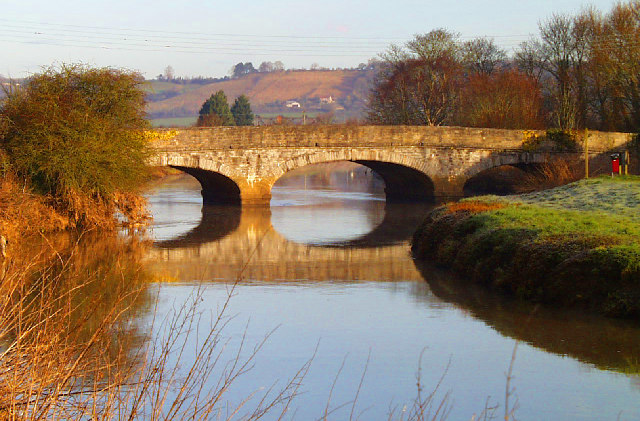
Gravatt's Great Bow Bridge of 1840, spanning the River Parrett, in Langport, Somerset

In 1835, Brunel was appointed to improve navigation on the River Parrett from Westport to Langport, Somerset. After gaining passage of their Act of Parliament in 1836, on Brunel's recommendation, the newly incorporated Parrett Navigation Company engaged Gravatt as their engineer on the Westport Canal in June 1836. His Great Bow Bridge of 1840 at Langport still survives.

=== Fallout with Brunel, Railway Mania losses ===
Although by 1839 Gravatt's northern engineering team had been delayed in reaching Bridgwater after legal difficulties in the company purchasing land, their remaining section between Bridgwater and Taunton had resulted in Brunel and Gravatt arguing over the most suitable route over the soft clay plains of the Somerset Levels and the River Tone. With mixed instructions given to the private contractors, bridges were sinking into the soft soil, and costs were escalating above budget. In mid 1841, Brunel revealed to the shareholders that he was about to dismiss his entire northern engineering team, although Froude was the son of major B&ER shareholder R.H. Froude, the Archdeacon of Totnes. Brunel wrote to Gravatt on 18 June 1841 stating that he had lost confidence in him, forcing his resignation; he was replaced by John Joseph Macdonnell. The Bristol to Bridgwater section of the B&ER was opened to traffic on 14 June 1841, and on 30 June through running on the GWR between London and Bristol began.

Gravatt subsequently resurrected his reputation by designing and being appointed superintended for the St. Philip's drawbridge, Bristol, which itself was replaced again in 1868. But post this period, although appointed Chief engineer on a number of proposed railway projects during the early Railway Mania period of 1845–6, as an investor he lost a great deal of money when many were never constructed.

=== Craig telescope ===
Returning to London, in 1850 Gravatt was selected by the Reverend John Craig to design and construct the Craig telescope. Living in an apartment at 34 Parliament Street, his neighbours included the portrait photographer Richard Beard, who in 1852 came to take pictures of the instrument for the Illustrated London News. Designed as a great refractor, it was a refracting telescope with an achromatic doublet, giving an aperture of 24 inches (610 mm). The doublet was made with flint glass by Chance Brothers, and plate glass by Thames Plate Glass Company. Gravatt designed the mounting himself, built on Wandsworth Common, featuring a 19.5 metres (64 ft) tall brick tower with a 24.5 metres (80 ft) long telescope tube, built by Messrs Rennie.

The eventual Craig telescope was the largest refracting telescope (a telescope with a lens) in the world from 1852. However, it had a problem with its lens figuring starting from its first light in the summer of 1852. It quickly fell into disuse, and was dismantled in 1857.

=== Difference engine ===
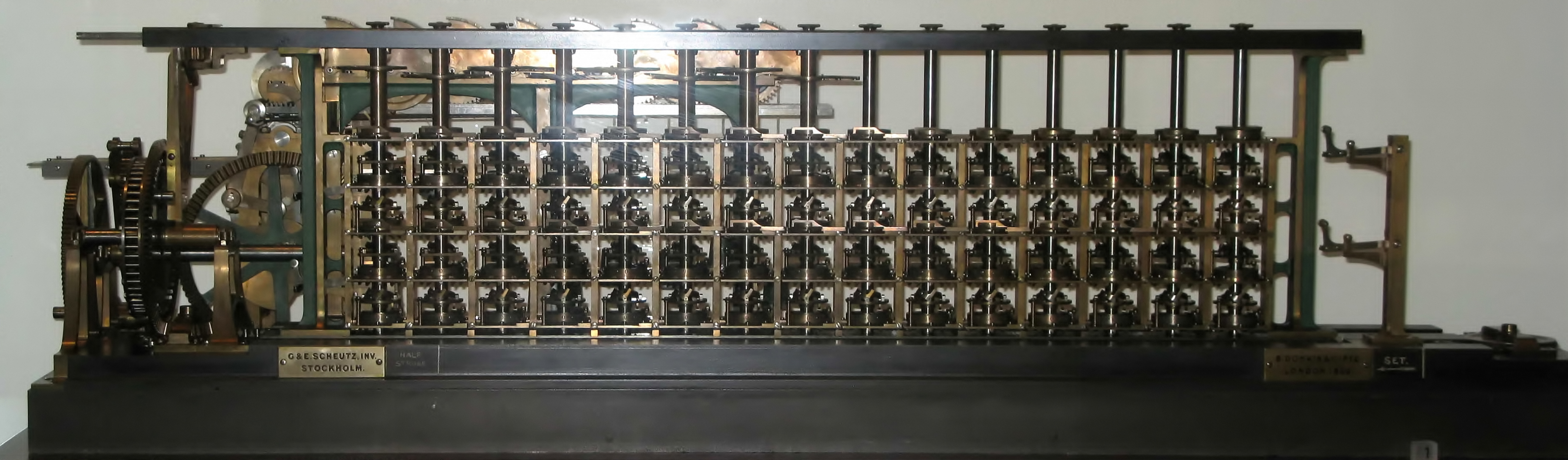
Per Georg Scheutz's third difference engine, on which Gravatt's replica was based

When Per Georg Scheutz brought his Difference engine to London in 1854, Gravatt engaged its inventor in conversation. His knowledge allowed Gravatt to commission a copy from Donkin, which was sent to Somerset House. From 1855 he gave lectures on the machine to professional audiences, including the Royal Society attended by Prince Albert, and followed this with lectures at the International Exposition in Paris. Gravatt then worked with the Registrar-General to establish public faith in the machine, by quickly calculating specimens of logarithmic and other tables. For his services rendered to science, he was elected Foreign Member of the Royal Swedish Academy of Sciences.

=== Institution of Civil Engineers ===
Gravatt became involved in a number of key and controversial discussions at the Institution of Civil Engineers. These included the theory of the jet-propeller, and the laying of submerged telegraphic cables based on his "curve of sines" theorem. Gravatt published on the subject on numerous occasions, including a paper written after a discussion on Messrs. Longridge and Brooks' Paper at the Institution in February 1858.

During his career, Gravatt collected a number of gifts, including: a pair of calipers made by Troughton; Donkin's chronometer by Hardy; a specimen of Babbage's original difference engine. He left them all in his will to the Institution.

== Death ==
After a ten month illness, Gravatt was accidentally poisoned by an overdose of morphine, given inadvertently by his longtime nurse, Ruth Henny. He died at his home, 15 Park Street, Westminster on 30 May 1866, aged 59. A later coroner's inquest cleared her of any cause in Gravatt's death, recording a cause of accidental death. He was buried at St John of Jerusalem Churchyard, South Hackney.
