= River Isle =

Tributary of the River Parrett in Somerset, England

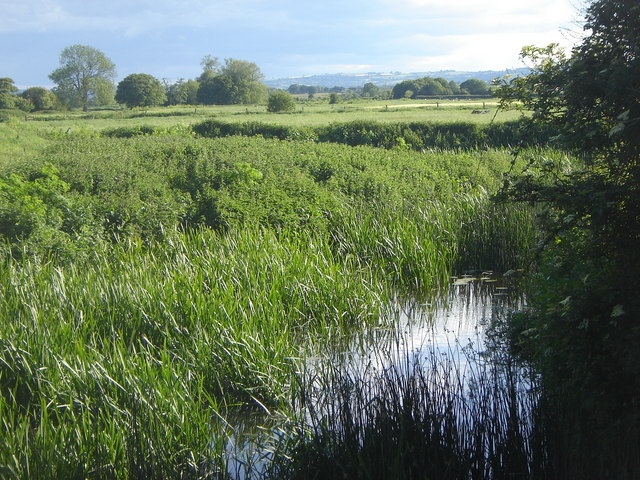
- River Isle at Isle Brewers

Location
- Country: England
- County: Somerset
- Region: Somerset Levels
- Cities: Isle Brewers, Ilminster, Knowle St Giles, Chard, Somerset

Physical characteristics
- Source
  - location: Combe St Nicholas, Somerset, England
  - coordinates: 50°55′10″N 2°56′23″W
- Mouth: River Parrett
  - location: Somerset, England
  - coordinates: 51°00′32″N 2°49′55″W
- Length: 14 mi (23 km)

The River Isle (also known as the River Ile) flows from its source near Combe St Nicholas, through Somerset, England and discharges into the River Parrett south of Langport near Midelney.

Several small springs merge into the river near Wadeford it then flows north past Donyatt, Ilminster, Puckington, and Isle Abbotts, before joining the Parrett. The first section of the river falls 250 feet (76 m) in 6 miles (9.7 km) and then falls less steeply falling 80 feet (24 m) during the subsequent 8 miles (13 km). As a result, several mills were built on the upper reaches of the river. At least one mill was in existence at the time of the Domesday Book in 1086. These mills were an important part of the local economy connecting with the wool trade.

The road bridge over the river at Knowle St Giles is a Grade II listed building.

A lock was built at the junction with the River Parrett, to maintain water levels, when the Westport Canal was built in the 1830s. The canal joins the river approximately 1 mile (1.6 km) before the confluence with the Parrett.

Chard Reservoir was built by damming the river in the 1840s to provide water for the Chard Canal.

== Tributaries ==
Near Ilton and Puckington, the Isle is joined by Cad Brook. The name of this stream is first attested in a thirteenth-century copy of a perhaps tenth-century forgery of a charter purporting to date from 725, as Caducburne. The name is attested again in the fifteenth century as Cadde. The second element of this name is an Old English word meaning "stream", the origin of the first element is less certain. In 1928, Eilert Ekwall guessed that Caduc was a diminutive form of a personal name Cada, thus meaning "Caduc's stream". By 1936 he had concluded that the name included a rare Old English word for jackdaw, cadac, in which case the river name meant "jackdaw stream". Andrew Breeze has more recently suggested that caduc was actually a Brittonic name for the stream, adopted into Old English with burn as an explanatory addition, related to the Modern Welsh word caddug ("mist, gloom, darkness").

The stream gave its name to the hamlet of Cad Green. By the 1920s, the stream itself seems to have been called the Ding, but recent maps show Cad Brook, suggesting that Cad Green has in turn given its name back to the stream from which it was named.
