= Chard Reservoir =

Reservoir in Somerset, England

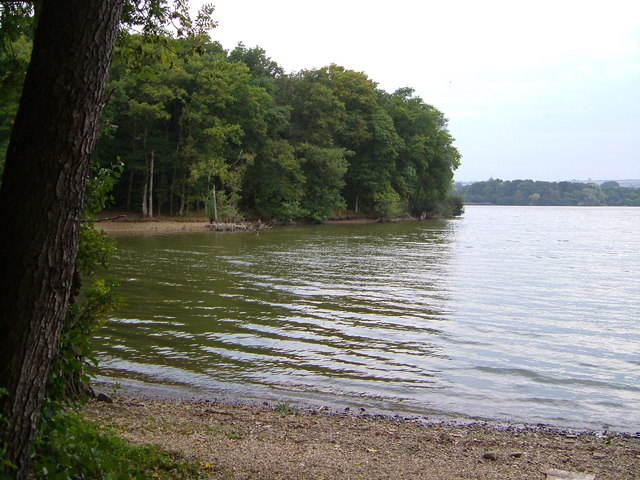

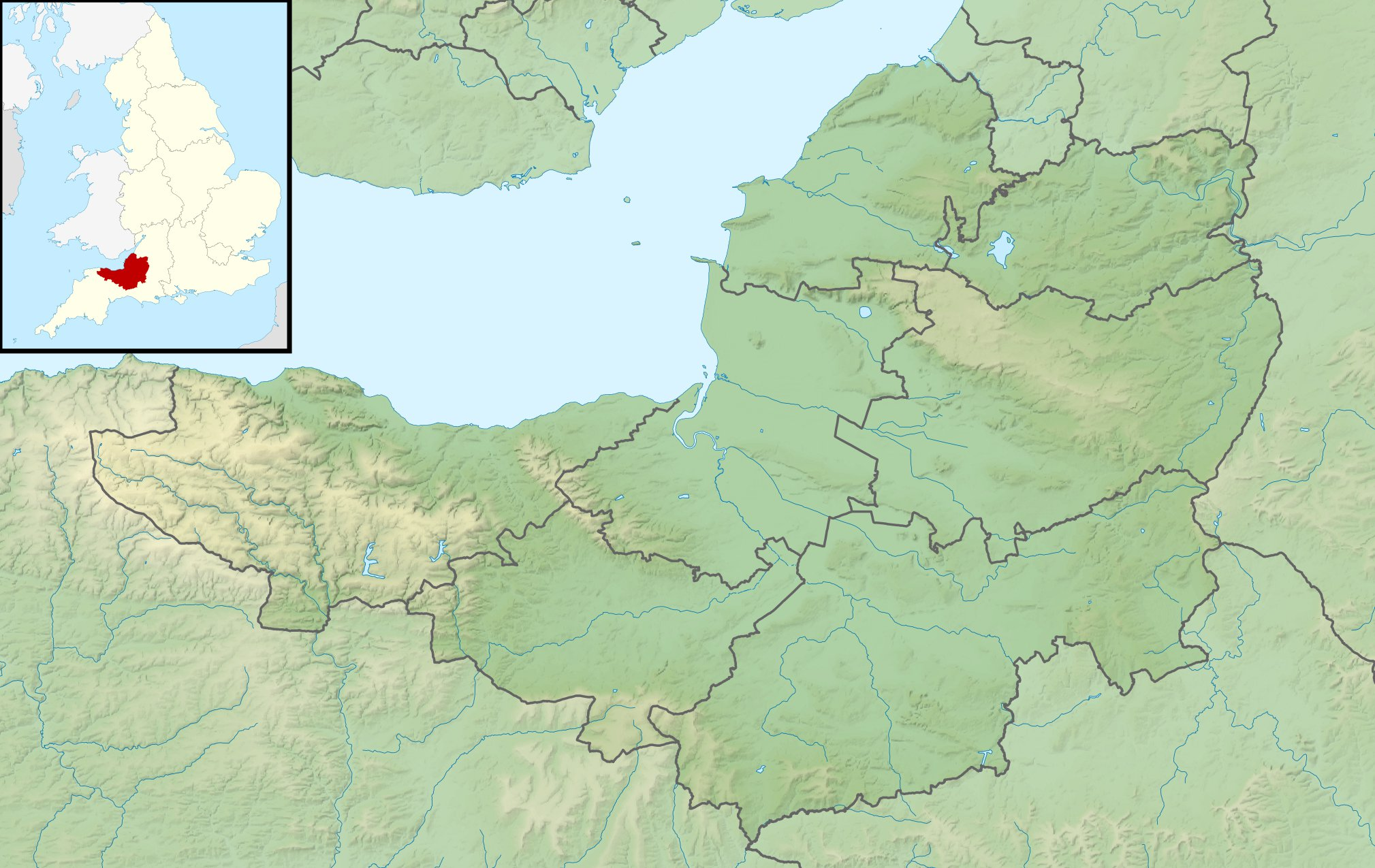
- Location within Somerset
- Location: Chard, Somerset, England
- Coordinates: 50°53′04″N 2°56′34″W
- Primary inflows: River Isle
- Primary outflows: River Isle
- Catchment area: 7.65 km^{2} (2.95 sq mi)
- Built: 1842
- Surface area: 36.97 hectares (91.4 acres)
- Water volume: 795,000 m^{3} (645 acre⋅ft)

Chard Reservoir is a 36.97-hectare (91.4-acre) reservoir north east of Chard, Somerset, England. It is owned and managed by Somerset Council and is a recipient of the Green Flag Award.

It was built on the River Isle in 1842 to provide water for the Chard Canal.

It is a Local Nature Reserve. It is used for dog walking, fishing and birdwatching, with a bird hide having been installed. Birds which are spotted regularly include herons, egrets, kingfishers, cormorants, grebes, gulls, ducks and also a wide range of woodland birds such as nuthatch, treecreeper and woodpeckers. Rarities have included ring-necked duck, great white egret, cattle egret and yellow-browed warbler.

The water is stocked with carp.
