= Langmead and Weston Level =

- Site of Special Scientific Interest
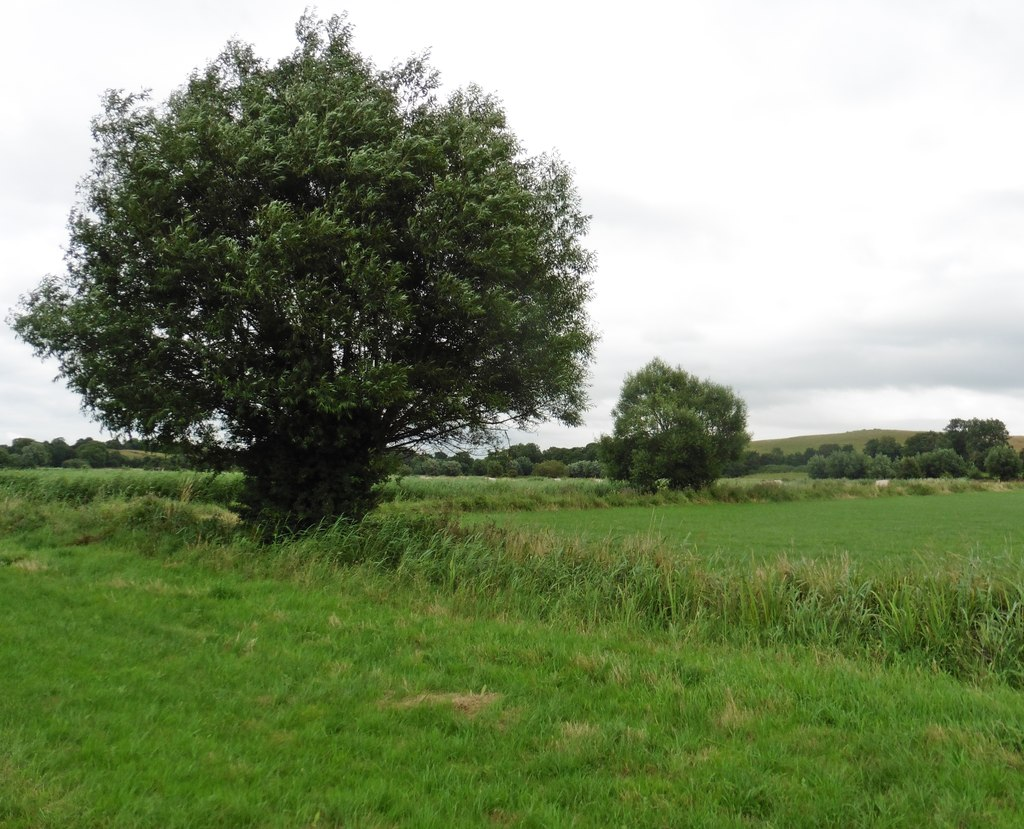

- Location within Somerset
- Location of Langmead and Weston Level.
- Area of search: Somerset
- Grid reference: ST353330
- Coordinates: 51.09264°N 2.92525°W
- Interest: Biological
- Area: 168.8 hectares (1.688 km^{2}; 0.652 sq mi)
- Notification date: 1991

Langmead and Weston Level (grid reference ST353330) is a 168.8 hectare (417.1 acre) biological Site of Special Scientific Interest in Somerset, notified in 1991.

Langmead and Weston Level form part of the nationally important grazing marsh and ditch systems of the Somerset Levels and Moors. The site is nationally important for its species-rich neutral grassland and the invertebrate community found in the ditches and rhynes. The land lies in the flood plain of the River Parrett and many of the fields are poorly drained and seasonally water-logged. The terrestrial and aquatic invertebrates recorded on the site include four nationally rare species: the Great Silver Diving Beetle (Hydrophilus piceus), the soldier fly (Odontomyia ornata) and two true flies, Lonchoptera scutellata and Stenomicra cogani.
