= Vincent Stuckey =

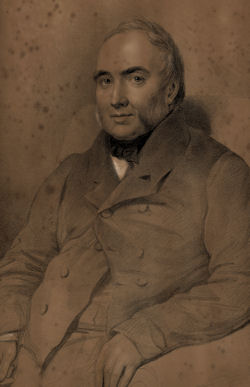
Vincent Stuckey by Eden Upton Eddis, 1830s.

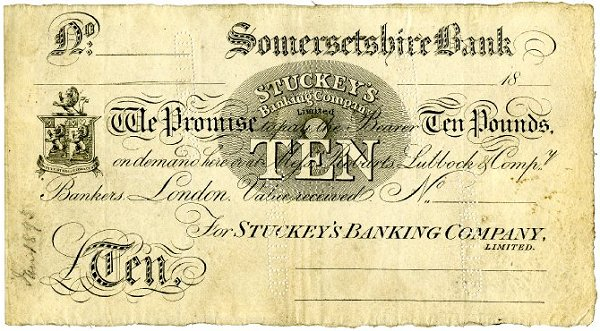
A Somersetshire Bank note for £10

Vincent Stuckey (24 March 1771 - 8 May 1845) was a merchant and banker of Somerset and Gloucestershire whose note-issue in his heyday was the largest in England and Wales except for the Bank of England itself.

== Early life ==
Stuckey was born at Langport on 24 March 1771.

== Career ==
Stuckey was a partner in S & G Stuckey & Co. (later Stuckey's Banking Co.) from 1807 to 1845. In his heyday, his note-issue was the largest in England and Wales except for the Bank of England itself.

== Death ==
Stuckey died at Langport on 8 May 1845.

== See also ==
- Parrett Navigation Company
