= River Parrett =

River in Dorset and Somerset, England

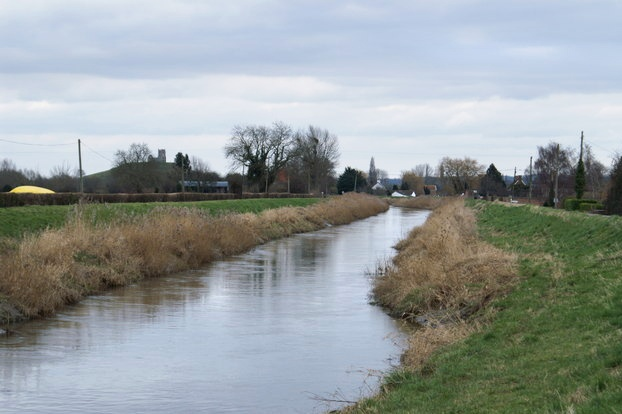
- River Parrett near Burrowbridge

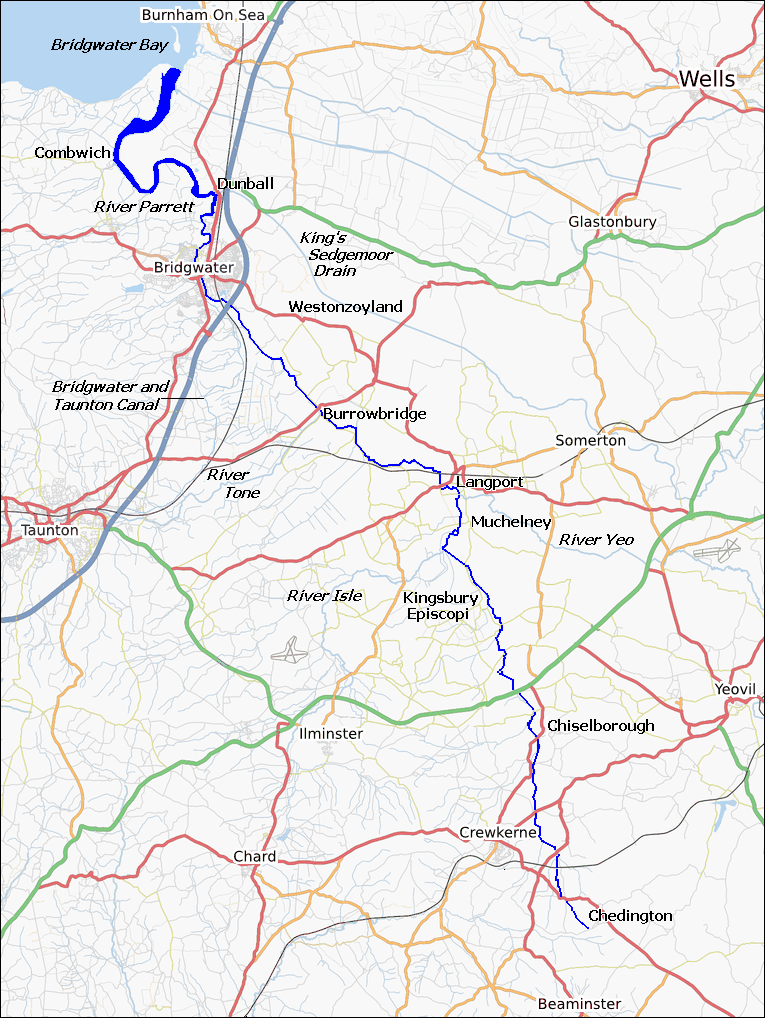
- Map of the river and major tributaries

Location
- Country: England
- Counties: Dorset, Somerset
- District: Somerset Levels
- Towns and villages: Bridgwater, Langport, Cannington, Combwich

Physical characteristics
- Source: Chedington
  - location: Dorset, England
  - coordinates: 50°50′48″N 2°43′58″W
- Mouth: Bridgwater Bay
  - location: Burnham on Sea, Sedgemoor, Somerset, England
  - coordinates: 51°13′45″N 3°00′31″W
- Length: 37 mi (60 km)
- Basin size: 643 sq mi (1,670 km^{2})
- Discharge
  - location: Chiselborough
  - average: 67.45 cu ft/s (1.910 m^{3}/s)
  - minimum: 2.5 cu ft/s (0.071 m^{3}/s)
  - maximum: 6,109 cu ft/s (173.0 m^{3}/s)

Basin features
- Tributaries
  - left: King's Sedgemoor Drain, Cannington Brook, River Yeo
  - right: Bridgwater and Taunton Canal, River Tone, River Isle

The River Parrett is a river that flows through the counties of Dorset and Somerset in South West England, from its source in the Thorney Mills springs in the hills around Chedington in Dorset. Flowing northwest through Somerset and the Somerset Levels to its mouth at Burnham-on-Sea, into the Bridgwater Bay nature reserve on the Bristol Channel, the Parrett and its tributaries drain an area of 660 square miles (1,700 km^{2}) – about 50 per cent of Somerset's land area, with a population of 300,000.

The Parrett's main tributaries include the Rivers Tone, Isle, and Yeo, and the River Cary via the King's Sedgemoor Drain. The 37-mile (60 km) long river is tidal for 19 miles (31 km) up to Oath. Between Langport and Bridgwater, the river falls only 1 foot per mile (0.2 m/km), so it is prone to frequent flooding in winter and during high tides. Many approaches have been tried since at least the medieval period to reduce the incidence and effect of floods and to drain the surrounding fields.

In Anglo-Saxon times, the river formed a boundary between Wessex and Dumnonia. It later served the Port of Bridgwater and enabled cargoes to be transported inland. The arrival of the railways led to a decline in commercial shipping, and the only working docks are at Dunball. Human influence on the river has left a legacy of bridges and industrial artefacts. The Parrett along with its connected waterways and network of drains supports an ecosystem that includes several rare species of flora and fauna. The River Parrett Trail has been established along the banks of the river.

== Course ==
The River Parrett is 37 miles (60 km) long, flowing roughly south to north from Dorset through Somerset. Its source is in the Thorney Mills springs in the hills around Chedington, 2.5 miles (4 km) from that of the River Axe, in nearby Beaminster, which runs in the opposite direction to the English Channel at Axmouth in Devon. The two rivers give their names to Parrett and Axe Parish Council.

From its source, the Parrett runs north through South Perrott and under the Salisbury to Exeter railway line before passing to the west of North Perrott and Haselbury Plucknett. It then runs through fields between Merriott to the west and West Chinnock and Chiselborough to the east. Passing under the A303 road to the east of South Petherton, the river flows between East Lambrook and Bower Hinton west of Martock and then towards Kingsbury Episcopi, through Thorney and Muchelney, passing the remains of Muchelney Abbey before entering Langport, which is about 10 miles (16 km) north of Chiselborough. Below Thorney Bridge the river's banks have been raised to mitigate flooding.

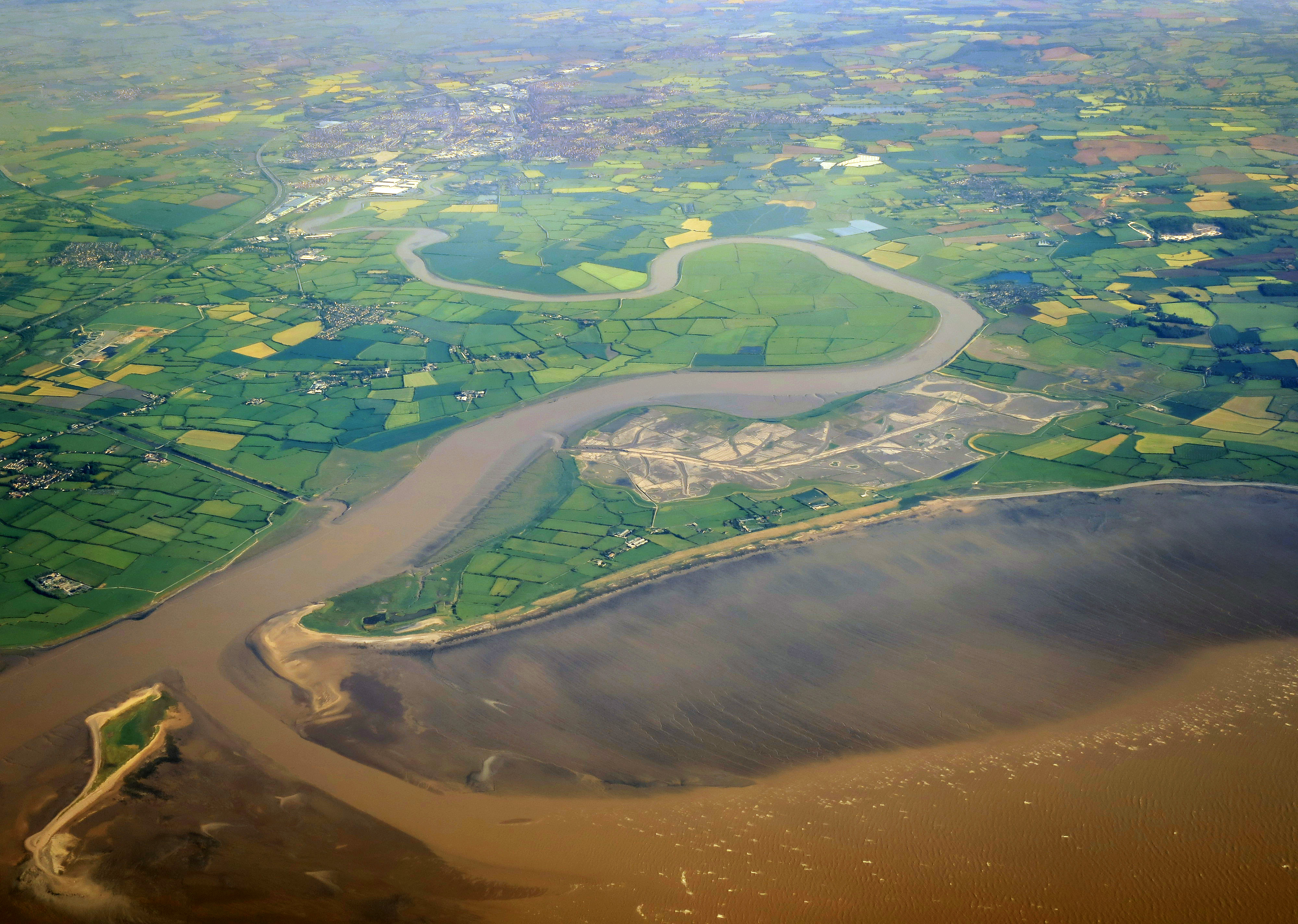
Aerial view of the mouth of the River Parrett as it flows into Bridgwater Bay

The Parrett then flows northwest for approximately another 10 miles (16 km) to Bridgwater through the Somerset Levels past Aller, close to the Aller and Beer Woods and Aller Hill biological Sites of Special Scientific Interest (SSSI). The sluice gate (formerly a lock built in the late 1830s) at the deserted medieval village of Oath marks the river's tidal limit. The river then crosses Southlake Moor. The next major landmark along the river's course is Burrow Mump, an ancient earthwork owned by the National Trust. The river then arrives in Burrowbridge, where the old pumping station building was once a museum. Flowing north, it passes Langmead and Weston Level SSSI, and on past the land-drainage pumping station at Westonzoyland.

Further downstream the river passes the village of Huntworth before flowing under the M5 motorway at Dunwear. As it enters Bridgwater it passes under Somerset and Hamp Bridges, and past Bridgwater Castle, which had a tidal moat up to 65 feet (20 m) wide in places, fed by water from the river. From Bridgwater to the sea is approximately 6 miles (9.7 km). The King's Sedgemoor Drain empties into the River Parrett next to the wharf at Dunball; it enters via a clyce (or clyse), which is a local word for a sluice. The clyce has been moved about 0.3 miles (500 m) downstream from its original position and now obstructs the entrance to the small harbour next to the wharf.

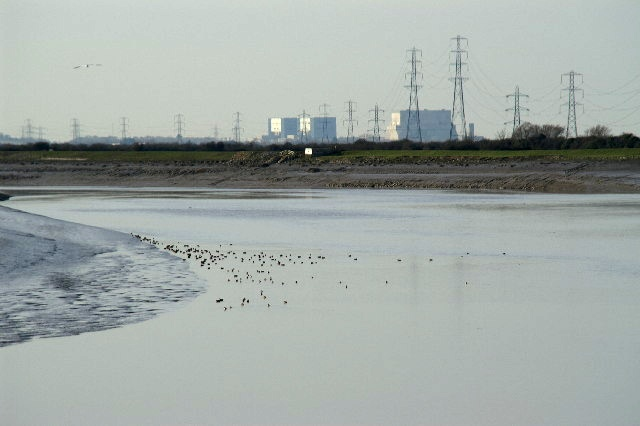
The river near Pawlett showing Hinkley Point power stations A and B

The course of the river below Bridgwater is now somewhat straighter than in former times. The village of Combwich lies adjacent to a channel in the river known as "Combwich Reach"; from here the Parrett flows to the Bristol Channel past the Steart Peninsula. Cartographic evidence indicates that in the early 18th century the peninsula was longer than at present. A "neck" started to form in the peninsula, and by 1802 the tip had broken off to form Stert Island. Fenning Island also broke away but has rejoined the peninsula. Much of the peninsula's northern end eroded away or now exists as "islands" visible at low tide within an intertidal area of mud known as the Stert Flats.

The mouth at Burnham-on-Sea is a nature reserve where the river flows into Bridgwater Bay on the Bristol Channel. In addition to the rivers Parrett, Brue and Washford, several of the man-made drainage ditches, including the River Huntspill from the Somerset Levels, and the Cannington Brook from the "Pawlett Hams", also discharge into the bay.

=== Flow and tidal bore ===
The Parrett has only one gauging station, at Chiselborough, fairly close to the source. It measures flow from the first 29 square miles (75 km^{2}) of the drainage basin, or about 4.3 per cent of the total. The mean flow measured by the Environment Agency at Chiselborough was 42 cubic feet per second (1.19 m^{3}/s), with a peak of 6,100 cubic feet per second (173 m^{3}/s) on 30 May 1979 and a minimum of 2.5 cubic feet per second (0.07 m^{3}/s) over a seven-day period in August 1976. Tributaries of the Parrett with gauging stations include the Yeo, Isle, Cary, and Tone.

The lower Parrett has a fall of only 1 foot per mile (0.2 m/km) between Langport and Bridgwater. To the northeast of the River Parrett's mouth, the Bristol Channel becomes the Severn Estuary, which has a tidal range of 14 metres (46 ft). The rate and direction of flow of the Parrett is therefore dependent on the state of the tide on the River Severn. In common with the lower reaches of the River Severn, the Parrett experiences a tidal bore. Certain combinations of the tides funnel the rising water into a wave that travels upstream at about 6 miles per hour (10 km/h), against the river's current.

=== Hydrology and water quality ===
Near the source at Chiselborough the typical level range for the depth of the river is 0.05 metres (2.0 in) to 0.63 metres (2 ft 1 in) but has reached a maximum of 2.93 metres (9 ft 7 in). The mean flow rate is 1.196 cubic metres per second (42.2 cu ft/s). By the time it reaches Gaw Bridge the normal level range is 0.23 metres (9.1 in) to 0.97 metres (3 ft 2 in) and a highest reading of 3.84 metres (12.6 ft). At West Quay in Bridgwater where the river is tidal the highest astronomical tide level is 8.63 metres (28.3 ft) above ordnance datum (AOD).

For the purpose of water quality measurement, the river is divided into five water body areas by the Environment Agency. In 2015, both the area from the source to Broad River around Crewkerne and the area from Broad River to Lopen Brook are rated good for chemical quality and moderate for ecological quality. The area from Lopen Brook to the River Isle, around Martock and South Petherton, is rated good for chemical quality, poor for ecological quality and poor overall. From the River Isle to River Yeo around Muchelney, chemical quality is rated good, and ecology is rated moderate. The section around Langport to the West Sedgemoor Drain continues to rate good for chemical quality and moderate for ecological quality, as does the final area leading to Bridgwater Bay.

== History ==
The origin of the name Parrett is unclear, but several derivations from the Celtic languages used in Wales have been suggested. Priestley-Evans suggests, "Parrett has been said to be a form of the Welsh pared, a partition, and that it was the name which the Welsh people of Somerset and Devon gave to that river because it was at one time the dividing line between themselves and the Saxons". Another spelling, parwydydd, is also translated as `partition'. Another explanation from Welsh, Peraidd, meaning the sweet or delicious river, has also been suggested. An alternative explanation, based on Celtic, is a derivation from Pedair or Pedride from pedr, meaning four and the Old Cornish Rit meaning `flow', which in this case would relate to the four flows or streams: the Tone, Yeo, Isle and Parrett. This is based on the explanation given in Ekwall's 1928 book English River-Names. Whichever derivation is correct, the name Parrett and its spelling variations have been in use since the Anglo-Saxon era, as evidenced by the addition of -tun onto river names as seen in the local towns North Petherton and South Petherton. The spelling Pedred and Pedrida are also mentioned in connection with the Parrett. The Oxford Dictionary of British Place-Names states only that the name is a 'pre-English river-name of obscure origin'.

=== Landscape ===
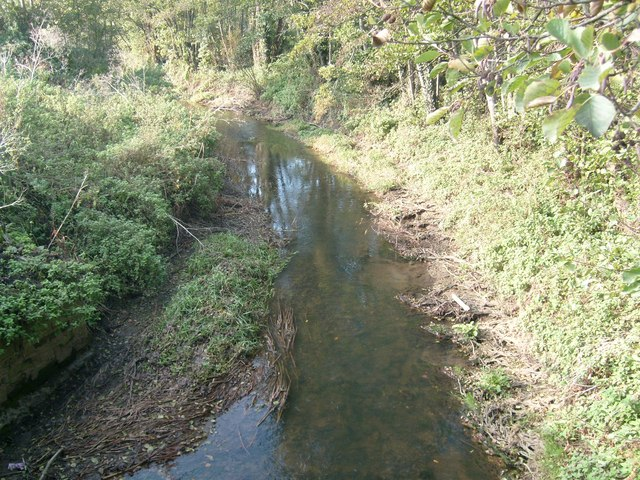
The river near the A303 at South Petherton

The River Parrett, the Bristol Channel and the Severn Estuary are believed to have been used for riverine bulk transportation of people and supplies in Somerset under Roman and later Anglo-Saxon and Norman occupation. Roman Somerset, which lasted for over 250 years until around the beginning of the 5th century, had various settlements, including Bath (Aquae Sulis), Ilchester (Lindinis) and lead mines at Charterhouse; and four roads surrounding the Somerset Levels. There is evidence of two Roman ports on the Parrett. The port at Combwich, on the west bank, was ill-recorded before its destruction by quarrying and erosion. The other at Crandon Bridge on the east bank near where the current King's Sedgemoor Drain enters the Parrett, was in use between the first and the fourth centuries. Evidence of an extensive site with storehouses was found in the mid-1970s, during motorway construction works. The Crandon Bridge site may have been linked by a probable Roman road over the Polden Hills to the Fosse Way, at Ilchester. Ilchester, the largest Roman town in Somerset, was a port with large granaries, sited where the Fosse Way crossed the Ilchester Yeo by means of a paved ford. The Yeo was navigable by small craft all the way to the Parrett allowing military supplies to be brought by boat directly to Ilchester; however, disembarkation at Crandon Bridge and use of the Polden Hills roadway allowed more rapid movement to Ilchester. The Yeo may already have been straightened and canalised before Roman occupation.

The Parrett was established as the border between the Anglo-Saxon kingdom of Wessex and the Brythonic kingdom of Dumnonia in 658, following the Dumnonians' defeat at the Battle of Peonnum that year. This natural border endured for almost a century until further fighting between the Anglo-Saxons and Britons in the mid-8th century, when the border shifted west to its current location between the modern ceremonial counties of Somerset and Devon. It is thought a ford, usable only at low tide, crossed the river near its mouth, between Combwich and Pawlett (east bank). This crossing, at the western end of the Polden Hills, was known since Roman times and lay on the route of a Saxon herepath. It was here, or in the immediate vicinity, that Hubba, the Danish raider, was defeated and killed by Odda in 878. In the Domesday Book Combwich was known as Comich, which means "the settlement by the water", from the Old English cumb and wic. The ford was later replaced by a ferry, one of which was in operation from at least the 13th century. In the 15th century the ferry was regarded as part of the King's Highway, and both passengers and cattle were carried in the 16th and 17th centuries. Records of the joint Manorial ownership and costs of the ferry exist for 1589 and 1810. The White House Inn, a licensed victualler and part-owner of the ferry, traded on the Pawlett bank from 1655 to 1897; the building was retained as a farm dwelling for another 20 years. The Combwich river crossing, which was a main route until the 18th century, fell out of use due to turnpike trusts improving what were to become the A38 and A39 roads, and traffic went via Bridgwater; the former inn was demolished c. 1930.

After the departure of the Romans, the low-lying Somerset Levels appear to have been abandoned, as the archaeological record shows that they were flooded and the former Roman landscape covered with a thick layer of alluvial deposits. Recovery of the levels involved both the construction of sea walls and the containment of the Parrett. Celtic Christianity came to the remoter areas of the Somerset Levels, making use of "island" sites. Glastonbury Abbey, possibly founded in the 7th century (or earlier), was nearby and had undertaken extensive water management to enable it to bring materials by boat to Glastonbury, albeit not via the Parrett. Muchelney Abbey, founded in the mid-8th century, was sited at the confluence of the Parrett and its tributaries, the rivers Isle and Yeo; and Athelney Abbey lay on another tributary, the River Tone. These three abbeys together with the Bishop of Bath and Wells were major landowners with fishing and riparian rights, often conflicting, on these rivers. They gained financially from improvements to land and waterways due to the resulting greater fertility of their lands and the increased rents that they were able to charge their tenants.

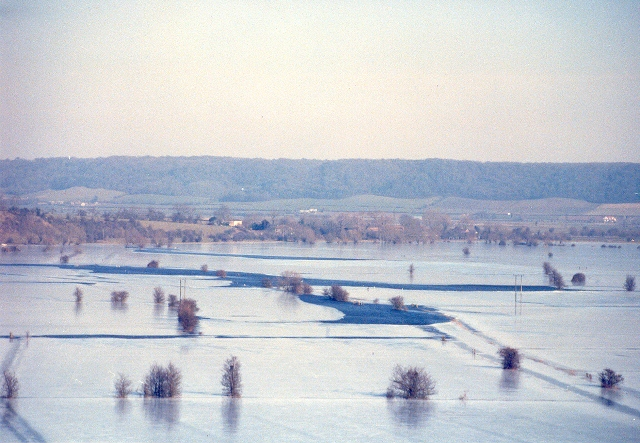
The flooded Southlake Moor in the winter of 1985

Continuing land reclamation and control of the Parrett was a long-running cycle of neglect followed by improvement. Work was carried out on the upper River Parrett basin in the Middle Ages by Glastonbury Abbey. Abbot Michael's survey of 1234 showed 722 acres (292 ha) of meadow recovered around the "island" of Sowy; from the accounts in the Abbey's rent books, this had increased to 972 acres (393 ha) by 1240. Flooding of adjacent moor land was partially addressed in the 13th century by building a number of embankment walls to contain the Parrett. These included Southlake Wall, Burrow Wall and Lake Wall. The River Tone was also diverted by the Abbot of Athelney and other land owners into a new embanked channel, joining the Parrett upstream from its original confluence. After the dissolution of the monasteries in the 16th century, much of the former abbey lands came under the control of the Crown, particularly King's Sedgemoor, which had been wholly owned by Glastonbury Abbey, with Henry VI's Courts of Sewers made responsible for maintaining existing drainage and various Commissions made responsible for land improvements. Further reclamation work was carried out over the next 500 years. In 1597, 50 acres (20 ha) of land were recovered near the Parrett estuary; a few years later 140 acres (57 ha) near Pawlett were recovered by means of embankments; three further reclamations, totalling 110 acres (45 ha), were undertaken downstream of Bridgwater by 1660. Kings James I, Charles I, and Charles II continued to improve King's Sedgemoor.

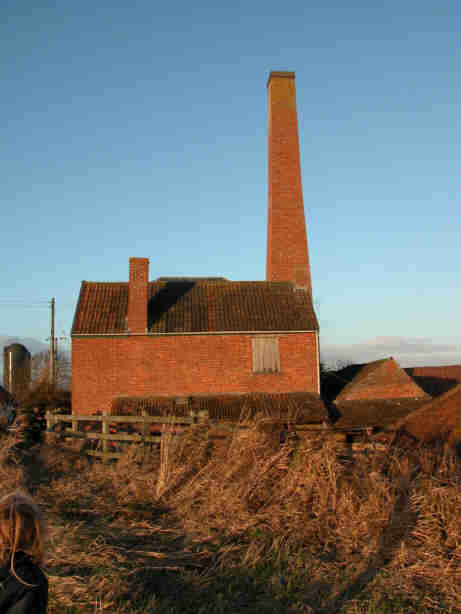
Westonzoyland Pumping Station Museum

Attempts were also made to improve navigation on the lower river. Between 1677 and 1678, Sir John Moulton cut a new channel at "Vikings Creek" on the Horsey Levels to remove a large meander; the old river bed soon silted up, providing 120 acres (49 ha) of new land. A further scheme was proposed in 1723 to improve navigation, shorten the journey time for boats, and recover land by obtaining an act of Parliament to make an artificial cut across the Steart Peninsula. Eventually, after much debate, the cut was not made due to lack of land owner support and concerns over costs and risks. The English Civil War put a stop to most reclamation work; however, in 1764 a clyse was built at Dunball to contain tidal influences on a run-off stream near King's Sedgemoor. Extensive land recovery was undertaken in the Somerset Levels by land owners between 1770 and the end of the Napoleonic Wars in 1815, as part of a general scheme of agricultural improvements, including improvements to the Brue Valley and to King's Sedgemoor. The latter involved the connection of various drainage schemes into a new hand-dug channel connected to the clyse at Dunball – the King's Sedgemoor Drain. Further drainage improvements were needed in the 19th century, which involved the use of mechanical pumping engines, originally steam powered but later powered by electricity. In January 1940, further improvements were funded by the Ministry of Supply, during the Second World War, as "Priority War Work" during the construction of Royal Ordnance Factory (ROF) Bridgwater. This involved doubling the width of the King's Sedgemoor Drain at its western end and the excavation of the River Huntspill. In the longer-term this provided a drain for the Brue valley, but in war-time the scheme provided a guaranteed daily supply of 4,500,000 imperial gallons (20,000 m^{3}) of water for the ROF.

The town of Bridgwater, from Brigewaltier (place at) the bridge held by Walter of Douai, or alternatively "Brugie" from Old English brycg meaning gang plank between ships, or from Old Norse brygja meaning quay, was founded as a new borough about 1200; it had a castle and a market and became a port in its own right. It was the major port for Somerset which, around the Quantocks, the Brendon Hills and the Tone valley, was mainly agricultural, producing arable crops and vegetables to supply the new industrial towns. Combwich was the traditional River Parrett pilots' harbour from at least the 14th century. It also served as a port for the export of local produce and, from the 15th century, the import of timber. Until the late 1930s, when the creek silted up, coastal shipping served Combwich's local brick and coal yard.

In the medieval era the river was used to transport Hamstone from the quarry at Ham Hill for the construction of churches throughout the county. Later, in the 19th century, coal from south Wales, for heating, Bath bricks, bricks and tiles would be carried. Brick making, which had been carried out intermittently in Bridgwater from the 17th century, by the late 18th century had expanded into an industry based on permanent brickyards in the Bridgwater area adjacent to the Parrett. The brick and tile industry made use of the local alluvial clays and the Parrett's coastal trade, using ketches mostly based at Bridgwater to transport their products, which were heavy and bulky, and to bring in coal to heat the kilns. The 19th century industrial revolution opened up mass markets leading to further expansion of the industry, particularly beginning in 1850 when the duty (tax) on bricks was abolished. Brick and tile works, making use of river transport, were opened in the 1840s and 1850s south of Bridgwater at North Petherton and Dunwear, in Bridgwater itself, and downstream at Chilton Trinity, Combwich, Puriton and Pawlett. Numerous brickworks were also opened elsewhere in Somerset, but many of them used the railways to transport their products; some 264 sites are listed in the Somerset Industrial Archaeological Society's Gazetteer of sites. Silt was also dredged from the river over a 2-mile (3.2 km) stretch between Somerset Bridge and Castle Fields, Bridgwater, to make Bath bricks, an early abrasive cleaning material patented in 1827.

=== Port of Bridgwater ===
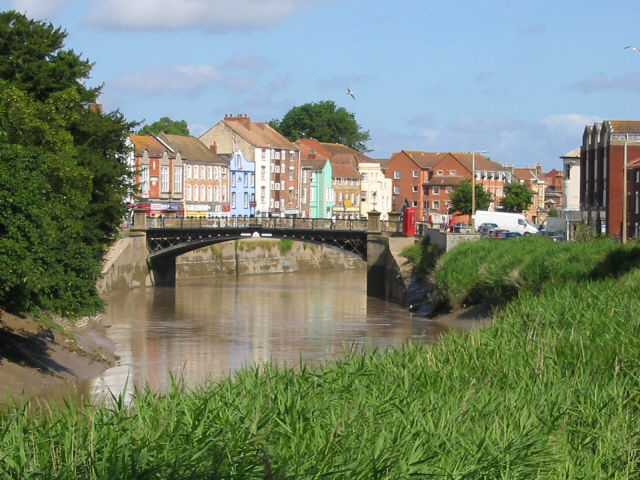
Bridgwater Town Bridge

Bridgwater was part of the Port of Bristol until the Port of Bridgwater was created in 1348, covering 80 miles (130 km) of the Somerset coast line, from the Devon border to the mouth of the River Axe. Under the Bridgwater Navigation and Quays Act 1845 (8 & 9 Vict. c. lxxxix) the Port of Bridgwater extends from Brean Down to Hinkley Point in Bridgwater Bay, and includes parts of the River Parrett (to Bridgwater), River Brue and the River Axe.

Historically, the main port on the river was at Bridgwater, where a span crossed the river from 1200 AD onwards. Quays were built at Bridgwater in 1424, with another quay, the Langport slip, being built in 1488 upstream of the Town Bridge. A custom house was sited at Bridgwater, on West Quay, and a dry dock, launching slips and a boat yard on East Quay. Bridgwater built some 167 ships, the last one being the Irene launched in 1907.

The river was navigable, with care, to Bridgwater Town Bridge by 400-to-500-tonne (390-to-490-long-ton) vessels. By trans-shipping goods into barges at the Town Bridge, the Parrett was navigable as far as Langport and (via the River Yeo) to Ilchester. After 1827, it was also possible to transport goods to Taunton via the Bridgwater and Taunton Canal at Huntworth. A floating harbour, known as the "docks", was constructed between 1837 and 1841, and the canal was extended through Bridgwater to the floating harbour.Lawrence & Lawrence 2005, pp. 157–158 The dock area contained flour mills, timber yards and chandlers.

Shipping to Bridgwater expanded with the construction of the docks, which opened on 25 March 1841, and reached a peak in the 19th century between 1880 and 1885, with an average of 3,600 ships per year entering the port. Peak tonnage occurred in 1857, with 142 vessels totaling 17,800 tonnes (17,500 long tons). In the short term, the opening of the docks increased the profitability of the Bridgwater and Taunton Canal, which carried 81,650 tonnes (80,360 long tons) of cargo in 1840. This peaked in 1847 at 88,000 tonnes (87,000 long tons) of cargo; however, by the mid-1850s the canal was bankrupt due to competition from the railways.

Combwich Pill, a small creek near the mouth of the river, had been used for shipping since the 14th century. From the 1830s, with the development of the brick and tile industry in the Combwich area, the wharf was used by two local brickyards to import coal and export tiles to Wales and parts of Gloucestershire. This traffic ceased in the 1930s; in the late 1950s the wharf was taken over and upgraded by the Central Electricity Generating Board (CEGB) to bring in heavy materials for the Hinkley Point nuclear power stations. Construction of Hinkley Point A nuclear power station was ordered in 1957, with a scheduled completion date of 1960, but was not completed until 1965. This was followed by Hinkley Point B nuclear power station, which began operation in 1976. It is proposed to use the wharf again for the construction of Hinkley Point C.

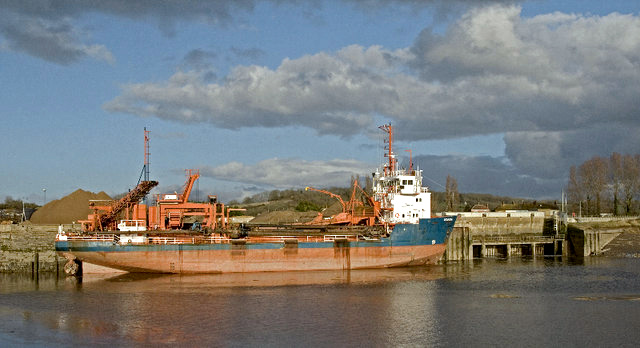
Dunball Wharf. To the right is Dunball clyce where the King's Sedgemoor Drain flows into the River Parrett.

Dunball wharf was built in 1844 by Bridgwater coal merchants, and was linked to the Bristol and Exeter Railway by a rail track which crossed the A38. The link was built in 1876, also by coal merchants, and was originally operated as a horse-drawn tramway. In 1875, the local landowner built The Dunball Steam Pottery & Brick & Tile Works adjacent to the wharf.

The Bridgwater and Taunton Canal, which had been bought out by the Bristol and Exeter Railway in 1866 and later passed into the control of the Great Western Railway had, by the beginning of the First World War, fallen into disrepair due to lack of trade. This trade, particularly the Wales-Somerset traffic after the opening of the Severn Tunnel in 1886, had been lost to the railways; the canal continued to be used as a source of water. In the mid-1950s, the Port of Bridgwater was importing some 80,050 to 106,800 tonnes (78,790 to 105,110 long tons) of cargo, mainly sand and coal by tonnage, followed by timber and flour. It was also exporting some 7,300 tonnes (7,200 long tons) of bricks and tiles. By then, Bridgwater's brick and tile industry was in terminal decline. In the 1960s, British Rail, the owner of the docks, which were limited by the size of its locks to boats of maximum size 180 by 31 feet (54.9 by 9.4 m), decided that they were commercially non-viable. British Railways offered to sell the docks to any buyer; however, there were no takers, so the docks were closed to river traffic.

Although ships no longer dock in the town of Bridgwater, 90,213 tonnes (99,443 short tons) of cargo were handled within the port authority's area in 2006, most of which was stone products via the wharf at Dunball. It is no longer linked to the railway system. The link was removed in the 1960s as part of the railway closures following the Beeching Report. Dunball railway station, which had opened in 1873, was closed to both passengers and goods in 1964. All traces of the station, other than "Station Road", have been removed. The wharf is now used for landing stone products, mainly marine sand and gravels dredged in the Bristol Channel. Marine sand and gravel accounted for 55,754 tonnes (61,458 short tons) of the total tonnage of 90,213 tonnes (88,788 long tons) using the Port facilities in 2006, with salt products accounting for 21,170 tonnes (20,840 long tons) in the same year, while the roll-on roll-off berth at Combwich is used occasionally for the transfer of heavy goods for the two existing Hinkley Point nuclear power stations. With the possible future construction of the two Hinkley Point C nuclear power stations by EDF Energy, it is proposed that Combwich wharf be employed to transfer heavy goods to the sites. Combwich Pill is the only site where recreational moorings are available in the estuary.

Sedgemoor District Council acts as the Competent Harbour Authority for the port, and has provided pilotage services for all boats over 98 feet (30 m) using the river since 1998, when it took over the service from Trinity House. Pilotage is important because of the constant changes in the navigable channel resulting from the large tidal range, which can exceed 39 feet (11.9 m) on spring tides. Most commercial shipping travels upriver as far as Dunball wharf, which handles bulk cargoes.

=== Parrett Navigation ===
The Parrett Navigation was a series of improvements to the river to allow increased boat traffic between Burrowbridge and Thorney. The work, done in the 1830s and 1840s, was made mostly obsolete by the coming of railways in 1853, though some aspects survive to this day.

==== Background ====
Trade on the river upstream of Bridgwater had developed during the 18th century, with 20-long-ton (22-short-ton) barges operating between Bridgwater and Langport, while smaller barges carrying 6 to 7 long tons (6.1 to 7.1 t) operated on the upper reaches between Langport and Thorney, and along the River Yeo to Long Load Bridge and Ilchester. The channel below the junction with the River Tone had been improved as a result of the River Tone Navigation Act 1698 (10 Will. 3. c. 8), passed in 1699, and the River Tone Improvement Act 1707 (6 Ann. c. 70), "for making and keeping the River Tone navigable from Bridgewater to Taunton", and a third act with a similar purpose was passed, the River Tone Navigation Act 1804 (44 Geo. 3. c. lxxxiii). Traffic on the higher reaches was hindered by shoals in the river and by the Great Bow Bridge at Langport, which consisted on nine small arches, none of them big enough for navigation. All cargoes heading upstream had to be off-loaded from the bigger barges, carried to the other side of the bridge, and reloaded into the smaller barges. Traffic above Langport was sporadic, as the water levels were often inadequate, forcing boats to wait several days for the right conditions before proceeding.

The abortive Ivelchester and Langport Navigation scheme had sought to avoid the Great Bow Bridge by making the Portlake Rhine navigable, rebuilding Little Bow Bridge in the centre of Langport, and making a new cut to Bicknell's Bridge. Seven locks, each with a small rise, were planned, but the scheme foundered in 1797 due to financial difficulties. After the cessation of hostilities with France at the beginning of the 19th century, there was renewed interest in canal building in Somerset; the Bridgwater and Taunton Canal was authorised in 1824, the Glastonbury Canal in 1827, and the Chard Canal in 1834.

When the Bridgwater and Taunton Canal was opened in 1827, it joined the Parrett by a lock at Huntworth, where a basin was constructed, but in 1841 the canal was extended to the new floating harbour in Bridgwater, and the Huntworth link was filled in. The canal and river were not re-connected at this point when the canal was restored, because the tidal Parrett, at Huntworth, is a salt water river laden with silt whereas the canal contains fresh water. Not only is there a risk of silt entering the canal, but the salt water cannot be allowed to contaminate the fresh, as the canal is still used for the transport of drinking water for Bridgwater's population.

==== Construction ====
With the prospect of the Chard Canal in particular damaging trade on the Parrett, four traders from Langport including Vincent Stuckey and Walter Bagehot, who together operated a river freight business, commissioned the engineer Joseph Jones to carry out a survey for the Parrett Navigation which was then put before Parliament. It was supported by Brunel and a large quantity of documentary evidence. Objections from local landowners were handled by including clauses in the act to ensure that surplus water would be channelled to the Long Sutton Catchwater Drain by culverts, siphons, and sluices, and the Parrett Navigation and Canal Act 1836 (6 & 7 Will. 4. c. ci) was passed on 4 July 1836.

The Parrett Navigation and Canal Act 1836 allowed the proprietors, of whom 25 were named, to raise £10,500 in shares and £3,300 by mortgage, with which to make improvements to the river from Burrow Bridge to Langport, to reconstruct the restrictive bridge at Langport, and to continue the improvements as far as Thorney. The River Isle, which joined the Parrett at Muchelney, was to be improved for its first mile, and then the Westport Canal was to be constructed from there to Westport. Locks were planned at Stanmoor, Langport, and Muchelney, with a half-lock at Thorney. An extra lock was added at Oath, when tests revealed that the depth of water would not meet that specified in the act without it. Costs were considerably higher than expected, and a second act of Parliament, the Parrett Navigation Act 1839 (2 & 3 Vict. c. xxxvii), was obtained to allow an extra £20,000 to be raised. The lock at Oath has since been replaced by a sluice gate to control flooding.

The section below Langport opened on 28 October 1839; the section to Thorney and the Westport Canal were completed in August 1840. The Langport Bridge was not finished until March 1841; of the £3,749 cost of construction, £500 came from Langport Corporation and the rest was raised by a bridge toll operated from March 1841 until January 1843. The total cost of the works was £38,876, and no dividends were paid until 1853, as all profits were used to repay the loans which had been taken out. There are no records of traffic, but it has been estimated at 60,000 to 70,000 long tons (61,000 to 71,000 t) per year, based on the toll receipts and the knowledge that the Stuckey and Bagehot boats carried about three-quarters of the total tonnage.

==== Decline ====
The Bristol and Exeter Railway opened in late 1853, and the effects on the Parrett Navigation were immediate. Despite petitions from users of the Westport Canal to keep their section open for navigation, the Commissioners opted to abandon the entire navigation; the canal was maintained for drain purposes only. Some boats continued to use the river to reach Langport and beyond until the early years of the 20th century. There is still a public right of navigation as far as Oath Lock, but very few private boats use the river, largely due to the fierce tides in the estuary and a lack of moorings along its route.

In 2019, the town of Langport obtained a grant of £179,000 from the European Agricultural Fund for Rural Development and the Department for Environment, Food and Rural Affairs (Defra). With a contribution from the town council and other sources, over £200,000 was available to improve access to 7.6 miles (12.2 km) of the river from Oath Lock to Thorney Bridge. The grant funded the construction of pontoons and access ramps, and improvements to the riverside pathway between Langport and Huish Bridge. The project covered 6.5 miles (10.5 km) of the upper Parrett, together with 1 mile (1.6 km) of the River Yeo and a tiny section of the River Isle. Langport councillor Ian Macnab launched a former ferry from Devon onto the upper Parrett on 5 July 2017, with a view to running it as a community boat. The launch of The Duchess of Cocklemoor was witnessed by over 200 local people, and the vessel has since had its diesel engine replaced by a 1.5 kW (2.0 hp) electric motor, powered by solar panels mounted on the roof.

== Bridges and structures ==
Much of the history of the river is defined by its bridges, which are described here from mouth to source. The Drove Bridge, which marks the current extent of the Port of Bridgwater, is the nearest to the mouth and the newest road bridge to cross the river. With a span of 184 feet (56 m), the bridge was constructed as part of the Bridgwater Northern Distributor road scheme (1992), and provides a navigable channel which is 66 feet (20 m) wide with 8.2 feet (2.5 m) headroom at normal spring high tides. Upstream of this is the retractable or Telescopic Bridge, built in 1871 to the design of Sir Francis Fox, the engineer for the Bristol and Exeter Railway. It carried a broad gauge (later standard gauge) railway siding over the river to the docks, and was movable, to allow boats to proceed up river. An 80-foot (24 m) section of railway track to the east of the bridge could be moved sideways, so that the main 127-foot (39 m) girders could be retracted, creating a navigable channel which was 78 feet (24 m) wide. It was manually operated for the first eight months, and then powered by a steam engine, reverting to manual operation in 1913, when the steam engine failed. The bridge was last opened in 1953, and the traverser section was demolished in 1974, but public outcry at this resulted in the bridge being listed as a scheduled monument, and the rest of the bridge was kept. It was later used as a road crossing, until the construction of the Chandos road bridge alongside it, and is now only used by pedestrians. Parts of the steam engine were moved to Westonzoyland Pumping Station Museum in 1977.

The next bridge is the Town Bridge. There has been a bridge here since the 13th century, when Bridgwater was granted a charter by King John. The present bridge was designed by R. C. Else and G. B. Laffan, and the 75-foot (23 m) cast iron structure was completed in 1883. It replaced an earlier iron bridge, which was completed in 1797 and was the first cast iron bridge to be built in Somerset. The stone abutments of that bridge were reused for the later bridge, which was the only road crossing of the river in Bridgwater until 1958. Above the bridge there were two shoals, called The Coals and The Stones, which were a hazard to barge traffic on the river, and bargees had to navigate the river at high tide, when there was enough water to carry them over these obstructions. In March 1958 a new reinforced concrete road bridge, the Blake Bridge, was opened as part of a bypass to take traffic away from the centre of Bridgwater. It now carries the A38 and A39 roads. At the southern edge of Bridgwater is a bridge which carries the Bristol and Exeter Railway across the River Parrett. Isambard Kingdom Brunel designed a brick bridge, known as the Somerset Bridge, with a 100-foot (30 m) span but a rise of just 12 feet (3.7 m). Work started in 1838 and was completed in 1841. Brunel left the centring scaffold in place, as the foundations were still settling, but had to remove it in 1843 to reopen the river for navigation. Brunel demolished the brick arch and replaced it with a timber arch within six months without interrupting the traffic on the railway. This was in turn replaced in 1904 by a steel girder bridge. Slightly further east is a modern concrete bridge which carries the M5 motorway over both the river and the railway line. It was started in 1971 and opened in 1973.

Before 1826, the bridge at Burrowbridge, just below the junction with the River Tone, consisted of three arches, each only a little wider than the barges that used the river. They restricted the flow of water in times of flood and made navigation difficult. The bridge was highlighted in a report made by William Armstrong in 1824, as a factor which would prevent the River Tone Navigation competing with the new Bridgwater and Taunton Canal, then being built. The Burrow Bridge (Somerset) Act 1824 (5 Geo. 4. c. xcii) authorising the construction of a new bridge and the removal of the old. A design for a 70-foot (21 m) single-span bridge in cast iron was dropped because of the cost of cast iron at the time, and instead a stone bridge was built, which was completed in 1826. This is the longest single span masonry road bridge in the county, and was also the last toll bridge in Somerset until it was "freed" in 1946. It now carries the A361 road. Just below the bridge there was a shoal of rocks and stones, which was also mentioned in Armstrong's report, but no action was taken to remove it. Except at spring tides, Burrowbridge was the normal upper limit for barges riding the incoming tide. Above here, horses were used to pull the boats, either towards Langport or along the River Tone towards Taunton.

Stanmoor lock was constructed above the junction with the River Tone, but all traces of it have gone. Next to the pedestrian bridge at Stathe four living willow cones, which were woven in 1997 by Clare Wilks, have now rooted and sprouted. Oath lock no longer functions as a lock, but the sluice is used to regulate the river levels. Below Langport, the river is crossed by a lattice girder bridge, carrying the Taunton to Westbury railway line, which approaches the crossing on multi-arched viaducts. This is followed by the derelict remains of the Langport lock and sluice.

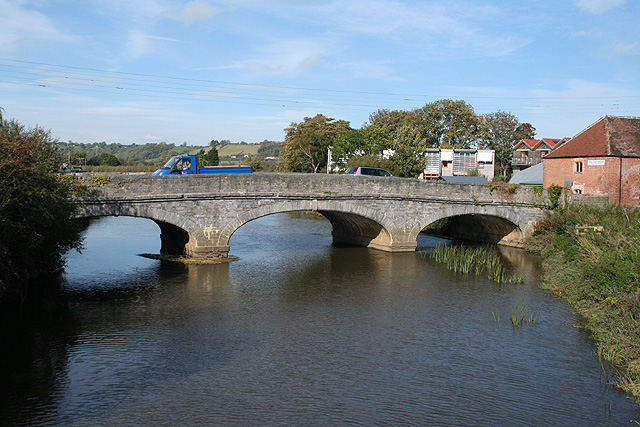
Great Bow Bridge at Langport

At Langport, the Great Bow Bridge, which now carries the A378, is a three-arched bridge, constructed under the terms of the Parrett Navigation and Canal Act 1836 (6 & 7 Will. 4. c. ci). Completed in 1841 at a cost of £3,749, it replaced the previous medieval bridge, with its nine tiny arches, all too small to allow navigation. A bridge at this site was first mentioned in 1220. The medieval bridge consisted of a total of 31 arches, of which nine crossed the river, and 19 of the original arches were located by ground-penetrating radar in 1987, buried beneath the road which runs from Great Bow Bridge to Little Bow Bridge. The Warehouse in Langport was built in the late 18th century of English bond red brick, with Flemish bond extensions. It has clay plain tile roofs with hipped ends. It was built by the Parrett Navigation Company, a trading company owned by Vincent Stuckey and Walter Bagehot, on the banks of the river. When the river became unnavigable, the building was no longer needed, and it was eventually abandoned. The Somerset Trust for Sustainable Development, which became the Ecos Trust, purchased the site, designated as a brown field site, in February 2003, and worked with Somerset Buildings Preservation Trust, English Heritage and local councils to redevelop it into a craft, heritage learning and small business centre, with the surrounding land being used for an eco-friendly housing development. It is a grade II listed building.

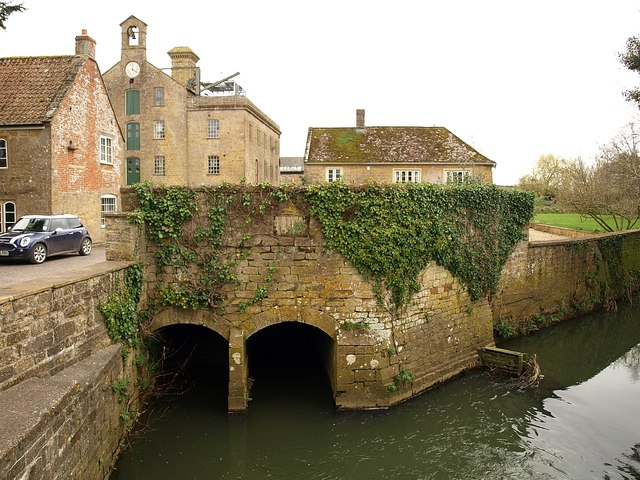
Parrett Ironworks from the Carey's Mill Bridge

The newest bridge across the Parrett is Cocklemoor Bridge, a pedestrian footbridge close to the Great Bow Bridge. It was erected in 2006 and forms part of the River Parrett Trail. The next bridge upstream is Bicknell's bridge, which was formerly known as Bickling bridge, which carries the road from Huish Episcopi to Muchelney. It replaced a footbridge in 1829 or 1830. At Muchelney the Westover Bridge carries a minor road over the river, and another minor road crosses on the Thorney Bridge close to the Thorney (or silent) Mill and a lock. The mill, with an iron overshot wheel, was built to grind corn in 1823. Another bridge and mill occur further upstream at Gawbridge west of Martock, where the mill has been the subject of a feasibility study by the South Somerset Hydropower Group. Carey's Mill Bridge was built of Ham stone in the 18th century and named after Carey's Mill, which originally occupied the site. It is surrounded by a collection of buildings known as the Parrett Iron Works, founded in 1855 on the site of a former snuff mill, which included a foundry, with a prominent chimney, ropewalk, workshops and several smaller workshops and cottages. The sluice which powered the waterwheel and sluice keeper's cottage still exist. Further south the river flows under the A303 near Norton-sub-Hamdon and the A356 near Chedington.

== Flood prevention ==
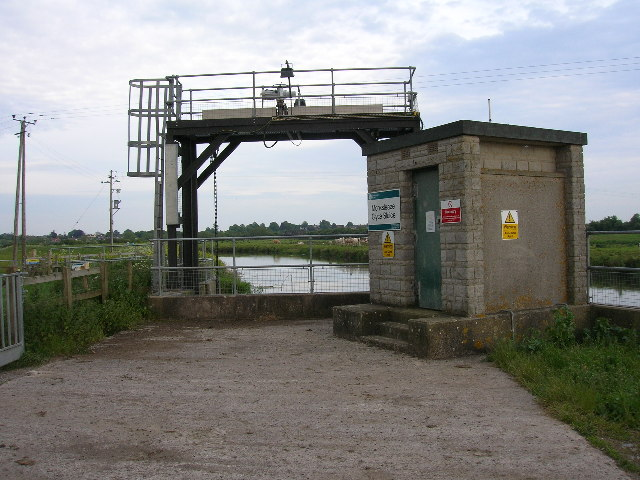
Monk's Leaze clyce. This sluice regulates the flow of water between the River Parrett and the Sowy River (the River Parrett Relief Channel).

The waters of the Severn Estuary, which are heavily laden with silt, flow into the lower reaches of the Parrett and the Tone on each tide. This silt can rapidly gather on the banks of the rivers, reducing the capacity and performance of the channel, and increasing the risk of flooding of surrounding land.

The river is a highland carrier, as it is embanked and the water level is often higher than the land through which it flows. Water from the surrounding countryside does not therefore drain into the river naturally, and drainage schemes have relied on pumping to remove the water. The pumping station at Westonzoyland was built in 1830, the first mechanical pumping station on the Somerset Levels. It was designed to drain the area around Westonzoyland, Middlezoy and Othery, and the success of the drainage system led to the formation of internal drainage boards and the construction of other pumping stations.

The pump at Westonzoyland originally comprised a beam engine and scoop wheel, which is similar to a water wheel, except that it is driven round by the engine and lifts water up to a higher level. After 25 years, there were problems pumping the water away as the land surface had dropped as it dried out. A better method was sought, and in 1861 a replacement pump was installed. The engine was built by Easton and Amos of London, to a design patented in 1858 by Charles Amos. It is a twin cylinder, vertical condensing engine, driving a centrifugal pump. A similar engine was on display at the Great Exhibition of 1851 and was shown to be able to lift 100 tons of water per minute (1,700 L/s), to a height of 6 feet (1.8 m). The Westonzoyland pump lifts water from the rhyne (pronounced "reen") into the River Parrett. The pump operated until 1951, when a new diesel-powered pumping station, capable of pumping 35 tons per minute (600 L/s) at any state of the tide, was built beside the old one. The pumping station is now an Industrial Heritage museum of steam powered machinery and land drainage, and houses most of the equipment from the disused Burrowbridge pumping station.

The Somerset River Authority was established in the 1960s, and later became part of Wessex Water. Tidal models were used to explore the effects of any improvements to the river, and the likelihood of adverse consequences, i.e. flooding and subsequent silting. Engineering works were undertaken at the Parrett, King's Sedgemoor Drain, and River Brue systems, to try to ensure that the agricultural land benefited from a potable water supply in the groundwaters from the Quantock Hills to the coastline.

Various measures including sluice gates, known locally as "clyce", have been deployed to try to control flooding. Completed in 1972, the Sowy River is a 7.5-mile (12.1 km) embanked channel which starts at Monks Leaze clyce below Langport, and carries excess water from the river to the Kings Sedgemoor Drain, from where it flows to the estuary by gravity, rejoining the Parrett near Dunball wharf. Construction of the channel, together with improvements to the Kings Sedgemoor Drain and the rebuilding of the clyce at Dunball, to create a fresh water seal which prevents salt water entering the drain from the river, cost £1.4 million. The scheme has resulted in less flooding on Aller Moor.

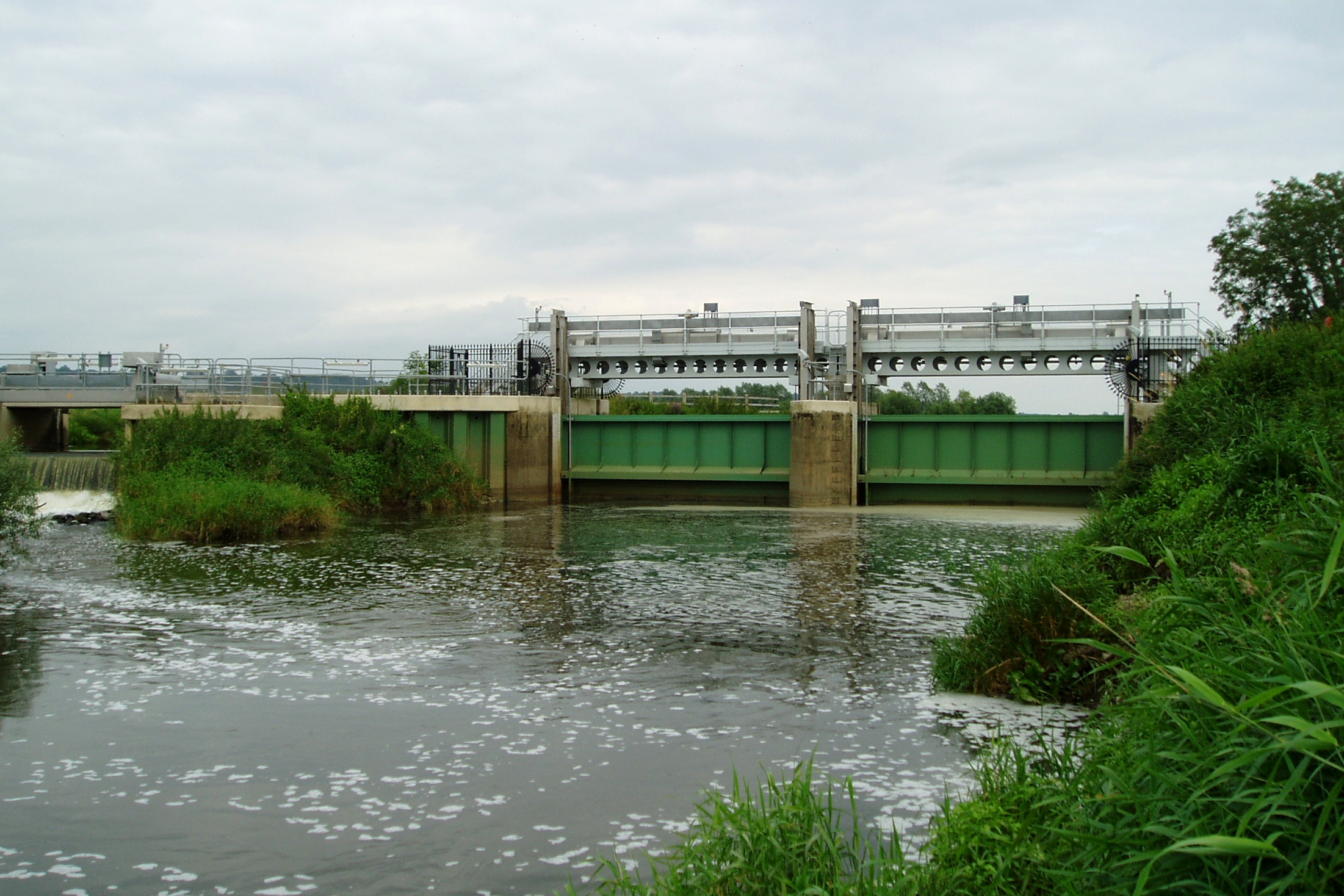
The sluice at Oath Lock in summer, with the gates lowered. Oath Lock cottage is off to the right.

In the 1970s a study was commissioned by Wessex Water to investigate the likely effects of constructing a tide-excluding barrier, aimed at stopping the silt, just upriver of Dunball Wharf on the hydraulic, sedimentary and pollutant regime of the estuary. Results showed that a site further upriver could be viable.

The area around the estuary, known as Parrett Reach, around the Steart Peninsula has flooded many times during the last millennium. As a result, the Environment Agency produced the Stolford to Combwich Coastal Defence Strategy Study in 2002, to examine options for the future. In July 2010 the Environment Agency presented plans to convert the peninsula into wetland habitat. It was claimed to be the largest wetland habitat creation scheme in England. The old sea-wall has been breached to let salt marsh develop.

Following summer floods of 1997 and the prolonged flooding of 1999–2000 the Parrett Catchment Project was formed, partly funded by the European Union Regional Development Fund, by 30 organisations, including British Waterways, Campaign to Protect Rural England, Countryside Agency, Department for Environment, Food and Rural Affairs, Environment Agency, Kings Sedgemoor and Cary Vale Internal Drainage Board (now part of Parrett Internal Drainage Board), Levels and Moors Partnership, National Farmers Union, Sedgemoor, Somerset County Council, South Somerset District Council, Taunton Deane and Wessex Water. They aim to tackle twelve areas, which, when combined, will make a significant contribution to reducing the adverse effects of flooding. These include the conversion of arable land, adoption of the Sustainable Drainage Systems (SuDS) approach to controlling rainwater runoff from developed areas, dredging, raising riverbanks and improving pumping facilities. Further studies of the possible beneficial effects of woodland in reducing flooding have also been undertaken.

During the winter flooding of 2013–14 on the Somerset Levels the River Parrett overflowed at new year, during the rain and storms from Storm Dirk, with many residents asking for the Environment Agency to resume river dredging. On 24 January 2014, in light of the continued flooded extent of the Somerset Moors and forecast new rainfall as part of the winter storms of 2013–14 in the United Kingdom, both Somerset County Council and Sedgemoor District Council declared a major incident, as defined under the Civil Contingencies Act 2004. At this time, with 17,000 acres (6,900 ha) of agricultural land having been under water for over a month, the village of Thorney was abandoned and Muchelney was cut off by flood waters for almost a month. Northmoor Green, which is more commonly known as Moorland, was also severely affected. By the end of January, agricultural land under water included North Moor, Curry and Hay Moors and Greylake. Bridgwater was partly flooded on 10 February 2014. Over 600 houses were flooded, and both flooding and groundwater disrupted services including trains on the Bristol to Exeter line between Bridgwater and Taunton.

As a result of the extensive flooding, more funds were allocated to dredge the Parrett, although there are doubts as to whether this is an effective solution to the problem of flooding. Also, earlier proposals for a tidal barrage across the Parrett were reviewed, and new proposals were suggested to construct the barrage at an estimated cost of between £26,000 and £100,000. Further planning and construction could take up to ten years. The Inland Waterways Association has suggested that the barrage should include a lock to enable boats to travel to Bridgwater and potentially to reopen the link to the harbour and the Bridgwater and Taunton Canal.

In January 2022 a £100m scheme to construct a tidal barrier at Bridgwater was announced, planned to be in place by 2027. It is to be built between Express Park and Chilton Trinity, with two vertical lift gates to allow the waterway to be blocked to stop water from flowing upstream during very high tides in the Bristol Channel.

== Geology ==
Close to the source of the river the underlying geology is a thin layer of Fuller's earth clay over Yeovil Sands. The resulting light soil made the area important for the production of flax and for market gardening in the past.

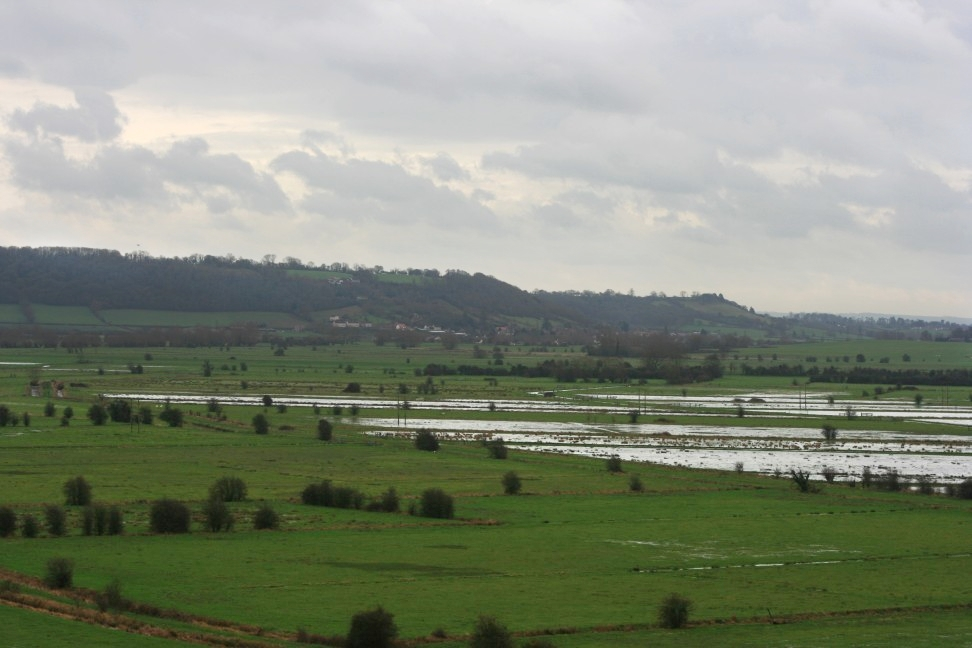
View from the summit of Burrow Mump across the winter-flooded Somerset levels toward Aller Hill and the village of Aller, Somerset.

Burrow Mump, an ancient earthwork owned by the National Trust, is a natural hill of Triassic sandstone capped by Keuper marl, standing at a strategic point where the River Tone and the old course of the River Cary join the River Parrett. It probably served as a natural outwork to the defended royal island of Athelney at the end of the 9th century.

The Levels and Moors are a largely flat area in which there are some slightly raised parts, called "burtles" as well as higher ridges and hills. It is an agricultural region typically with open fields of permanent grass, surrounded by ditches lined with willow trees. Access to the Levels and Moors is by "droves", i.e. green lanes. The Levels are a coastal sand and clay barrier about 20 feet (6 m) above mean sea level (roughly west of the M5 motorway) whereas the inland Moors can be 20 feet (6 m) below peak tides and have large areas of peat. The geology of the area is that of two basins mainly surrounded by hills, the runoff from which forms rivers that originally meandered across the plain but have now been controlled by embanking and clyces. The area is prone to winter floods of fresh water and occasional salt water inundations, the worst of which in recorded history was the Bristol Channel floods of 1607, which resulted in the drowning of an estimated 2,000 or more people, with houses and villages swept away, an estimated 200 square miles (520 km^{2}) of farmland inundated and livestock destroyed. A further severe flood occurred in 1872–1873 when over 107 square miles (277 km^{2}) were under water from October to March.

The extraction of peat from the Moors is known to have taken place during Roman times, and has been an ongoing practice since the levels were first drained. The introduction of plastic packaging in the 1950s allowed the peat to be packed without rotting. This led to the industrialisation of peat extraction during the 1960s as a major market in horticultural peat was developed. The reduction in water levels that resulted put local ecosystems at risk; peat wastage in pasture fields was occurring at rates of 1–3 ft (0.3–0.9 m) over 100 years.

== Ecology ==
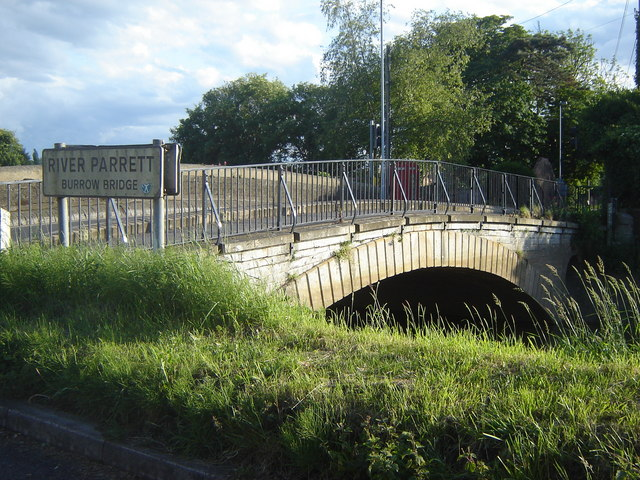
1826 bridge at Burrowbridge

The river flows through several areas of ecological interest and supports a variety of rare and endangered species.

From January until May, the Parrett provides a source of European eels (Anguilla anguilla) and young elvers, which are caught by hand netting as this is the only legal means of catching them. A series of eel passes have been built on the Parrett at the King's Sedgemoor Drain to help this endangered species; cameras have shown 10,000 eels migrating upstream in a single night. The 2003 BBC Radio 4 play Glass Eels by Nell Leyshon was set on the Parrett.

To the north of the river bank northwest of Langport are the Aller and Beer Woods and Aller Hill biological Sites of Special Scientific Interest (SSSI). Aller and Beer Woods is a Somerset Wildlife Trust reserve. It consists of large blocks of semi-natural ancient woodland along the west-facing slope of Aller Hill, overlooking King's Sedgemoor. The reserve is about 40 hectares (99 acres) and the underlying geology of most of it is Lias limestone. Prior to the 20th century it appears to have been managed for centuries as traditional coppice woodland, and it provides an outstanding example of ancient escarpment woodland. The woodland is a variant of the calcareous ash/wych elm stand-type, with pedunculate oak (Quercus robur), and ash (Fraxinus excelsior) the dominant canopy trees throughout, and with scattered concentrations of wych elm (Ulmus glabra). Ancient woodland indicators include small-leaved lime (Tilia cordata), and wild service tree (Sorbus torminalis), both of which are locally common. Plants of particular interest include bird's nest orchid (Neottia nidus-avis), greater butterfly orchid (Platanthera chlorantha) and the very rare Red Data Book species purple gromwell (Lithospermum purpurocaeruleum). Aller Hill contains three species of plant which are nationally rare and a further three which are of restricted distribution in Somerset. The central area contains a sward dominated by sheep's fescue (Festuca ovina) in combination with yellow oat-grass (Trisetum flavescens) and quaking-grass (Briza media). Salad burnet (Sanguisorba minor) forms a major component of the sward with the two nationally rare species rough marsh-mallow (Malva setigera) and nit-grass (Gastridium ventricosum), also present.

Southlake Moor is another SSSI. The marshes and ditches provide grazing. At certain times of the year sluice gates can be opened to flood the moor. Greater water-parsnip (Sium latifolium) is among the 96 aquatic and vascular plant species on the moor. Numerous wildfowl visit the flooded moor; up to 22,000 wigeon (Anas penelope), 250 Bewick's swan (Cygnus bewickii) and significant populations of pochard (Aythya ferina), teal (Anas crecca) and tufted duck (Aythya fuligula). Signs of European otters (Lutra lutra) have also been seen on the river banks. Palmate newts (Triturus helveticus) have been found in surrounding ditches.

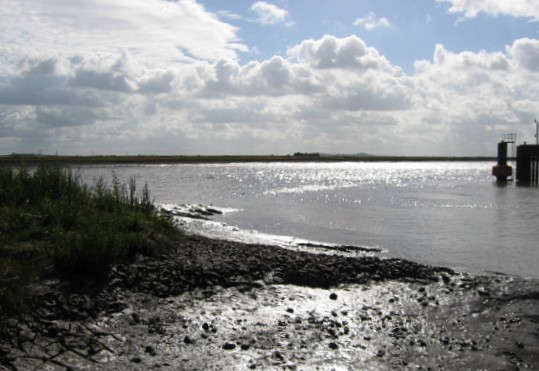
Tidal mudflats at Combwich, near the mouth of the River Parrett on Bridgwater Bay

Langmead and Weston Level is nationally important for its species-rich neutral grassland and the invertebrate community found in the ditches and rhynes. The terrestrial and aquatic invertebrates recorded on the site include four nationally rare species: the great silver diving beetle (Hydrophilus piceus), the soldier fly Odontomyia ornata, which is now called the ornate brigadier, and two other flies, Lonchoptera scutellata and Stenomicra cogani.

The Parrett then flows through the Somerset Levels National Nature Reserve, which contains a rich biodiversity of national and international importance. It supports a vast variety of plant species, including common plants such as marsh-marigold (Caltha palustris), meadowsweet (Filipendula ulmaria) and ragged-robin (Lychnis flos-cuculi). The area is an important feeding ground for birds including Bewick's swan (Cygnus columbianus bewickii), Eurasian curlew (Numenius arquata), common redshank (Tringa totanus), skylark (Alauda arvensis), common snipe (Gallinago gallinago), common teal (Anas crecca), Eurasian wigeon (Anas penelope) and Eurasian whimbrel (Numenius phaeopus), as well as birds of prey including the western marsh harrier (Circus aeruginosus) and peregrine falcon (Falco peregrinus). A wide range of invertebrate species is also present including rare insects, particularly the hairy click beetle (Synaptus filiformis), which until recently was only known in Britain from the Parrett, and other insects, including the lesser silver water beetle (Hydrochara caraboides), Bagous nodulosus, Hydrophilus piceus, Odontomyia angulata, Oulema erichsoni and Valvata macrostoma. In addition, the area supports an important European otter (Lutra lutra) population. 282 American mink (Mustela vison) have been captured after their escape from breeding farms, which is encouraging water voles (Arvicola amphibius) to recolonise areas of the Levels where they have been absent for 10 years. The Levels and Moors include 32 Sites of Special Scientific Interest (twelve of them also Special Protection Areas), the Huntspill River and Bridgwater Bay National Nature Reserves, the Somerset Levels and Moors Ramsar Site covering about 86,000 acres (348 km^{2}), the Somerset Levels National Nature Reserve, Shapwick Heath National Nature Reserve, and numerous Scheduled Ancient Monuments. In addition, some 72,000 acres (290 km^{2}) of the Levels are recognised as an environmentally sensitive area, while other portions are designated as Areas of High Archaeological Potential. Despite this, there is currently no single conservation designation covering the entire area of the Levels and Moors.

On the outskirts of Bridgwater at Huntworth the river passes several local nature reserves which provide roosts for thousands of common starlings (Sturnus vulgaris) each winter. The mouth of the river is where it flows into the National Nature Reserve at Bridgwater Bay on the Bristol Channel. It consists of large areas of mudflats, saltmarsh, sandflats and shingle ridges, some of which are vegetated. It has been designated as a Site of Special Scientific Interest since 1989, and is designated as a wetland of international importance under the Ramsar Convention. The risks to wildlife are highlighted in the local Oil Spill Contingency Plan.

== Tourism ==
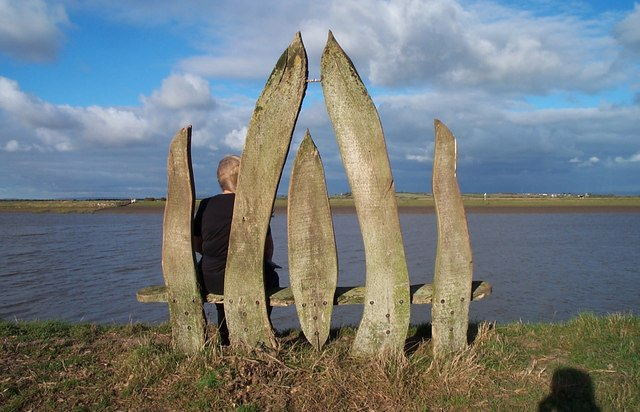
Seat, made in 1996, on the west bank of the Parrett Estuary, a mile from the village of Combwich

The 47-mile (76 km) River Parrett Trail is a long-distance footpath following the Parrett from its source to the sea. The river passes many landmarks and places of interest including: Burrow Hill Cider Farm, Muchelney Abbey, West Sedgemoor (a Site of Special Scientific Interest (SSSI), the Blake Museum, Westonzoyland Pumping Station Museum, the site of the Battle of Sedgemoor, and finally discharges into Bridgwater Bay (another SSSI). The Langport and River Parrett Visitor Centre located at Langport details local life, history and wildlife.

Since 2000, attempts have been made to clarify the legal status and organisational responsibilities for the maintenance of the river and explore issues involving the sustainability and safe use of the waterway for a public trip boat and recreational craft. The work has identified economic and social benefits from the development of the Parrett navigation.

== Route and points of interest ==
Point	Coordinates (Links to map resources)	OS Grid Ref	Notes
Source	50.847°N 2.733°W	ST484055	near Chedington
Hydrological measuring station	50.927°N 2.769°W	ST461144	Located under road bridge at Chiselborough
A303 bridge	50.947°N 2.783°W	ST450167	South Petherton
River Isle confluence	51.009°N 2.832°W	ST416237	
River Yeo confluence	51.032°N 2.822°W	ST424262	
Bow Bridge	51.036°N 2.835°W	ST415266	Langport
Monk's Leaze clyce	51.048°N 2.844°W	ST408280	Regulates flow into Sowy River
Oath Lock	51.047°N 2.881°W	ST382128	Tidal limit of the river
River Tone confluence	51.067°N 2.917°W	ST357302	Located at Burrowbridge
Westonzoyland Pumping Station Museum	51.091°N 2.944°W	ST339328	
Town Bridge	51.129°N 3.001°W	ST300372	Bridgwater
Drove Bridge	51.138°N 3.001°W	ST300382	Most seaward and newest road bridge on river
Dunball Wharf	51.162°N 2.989°W	ST309408	
Mouth	51.229°N 3.009°W	ST296482	

== See also ==
- North Petherton and South Petherton (named after the river)
- Rivers of the United Kingdom
- Taunton Stop Line – World War II defensive line in south west England
