= Burrowbridge =

Village and civil parish in Somerset, England

Coordinates: 51.071°N 2.919°W

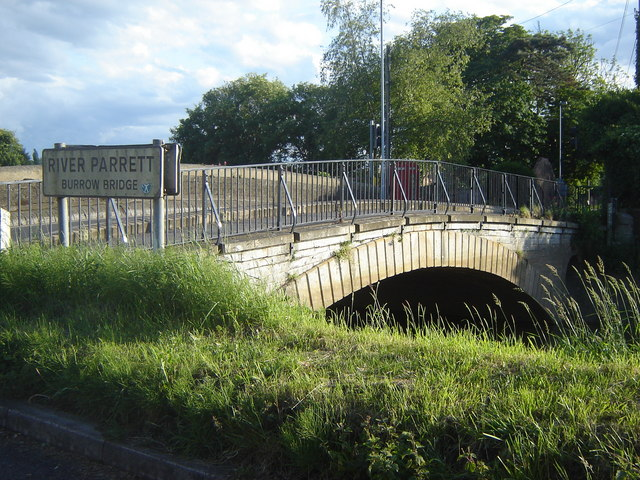
- The bridge over the River Parrett

- Location within Somerset
- Population: 524 (2021 census)
- OS grid reference: ST3530
- Civil parish: Burrowbridge
- Unitary authority: Somerset Council
- Ceremonial county: Somerset
- Region: South West
- Country: England
- Sovereign state: United Kingdom
- Post town: BRIDGWATER
- Postcode district: TA7
- Dialling code: 01823
- Police: Avon and Somerset
- Fire: Devon and Somerset
- Ambulance: South Western
- UK Parliament: Taunton and Wellington

Burrowbridge is a village and civil parish in Somerset, England, situated on the River Parrett and the A361 road on the edge of the Somerset Levels. It is located 5 miles (8.0 km) southeast of Bridgwater, and has a population of 508.

== History ==
The name probably comes from the Old English buruh (fortified hill) and brycg (bridge).

In the village is Burrow Mump, an ancient earthwork now owned by the National Trust, presented by Major A.C. Barrett in 1946 as a war memorial. Burrow Mump is also known as St Michael's Borough or Tutteyate. It is a natural hill of Triassic sandstone capped by Keuper marl. Excavations showed evidence of a 12th-century masonry building on the top of the hill. The first recorded writing mentioning this site is from William of Worcestre about 1480, when he referred to it as Myghell-borough. A medieval church dedicated to St Michael from at least the mid-15th century formed a sanctuary for royalist troops in 1645. The ruins visible today are from the 18th century.

The historic area of the Isle of Athelney is located towards the western part of the village.

Prior to 1826, the bridge over the River Parrett, just below the junction with the River Tone, consisted of three arches, each only a little wider than the barges that used the river. They restricted the flow of water in times of flood and made navigation difficult. The bridge was highlighted in a report made by William Armstrong in 1824, as a factor that would prevent the River Tone Navigation from competing with the new Bridgwater and Taunton Canal, then being built.

Burrow Bridge (Somerset) Act 1824
- Act of Parliament
- Parliament of the United Kingdom
- Long title: An Act for taking down Burrow Bridge, over the River Parrett, in the County of Somerset, and erecting another in lieu thereof.
- Citation: 5 Geo. 4. c. xcii

Dates
- Royal assent: 3 June 1824

Text of statute as originally enacted

The Burrow Bridge (Somerset) Act 1824 (5 Geo. 4. c. xcii) appointed a new statutory body, the Burrow Bridge Commissioners, authorising the construction of a new bridge and the removal of the old. A design for a 70-foot (21 m) single-span bridge in cast iron was dropped because of the cost of cast iron at the time, and instead a stone bridge was built and completed in 1826. It is the longest single-span masonry road bridge in the county, and was the last toll bridge in Somerset before being 'freed' on 1 April 1945 after the bridge was bought by Somerset County Council. Just below the bridge there was a shoal of rocks and stones, which was also mentioned in Armstrong's report, but no action was taken to remove it. Except on spring tides, Burrowbridge was the normal upper limit for barges riding the incoming tide. Above here, horses were used to pull the boats, either towards Langport or along the River Tone towards Taunton.

There are four active pumping stations within the parish, all of which are now electric with diesel backup. One more is redundant: the Aller Moor station near the bridge is now incorporated into a private house. The original mid-19th century machinery is listed and preserved in situ. A few miles west is the preserved very early Westonzoyland Pumping Station Museum, which is in steam on regular occasions.

== Governance ==
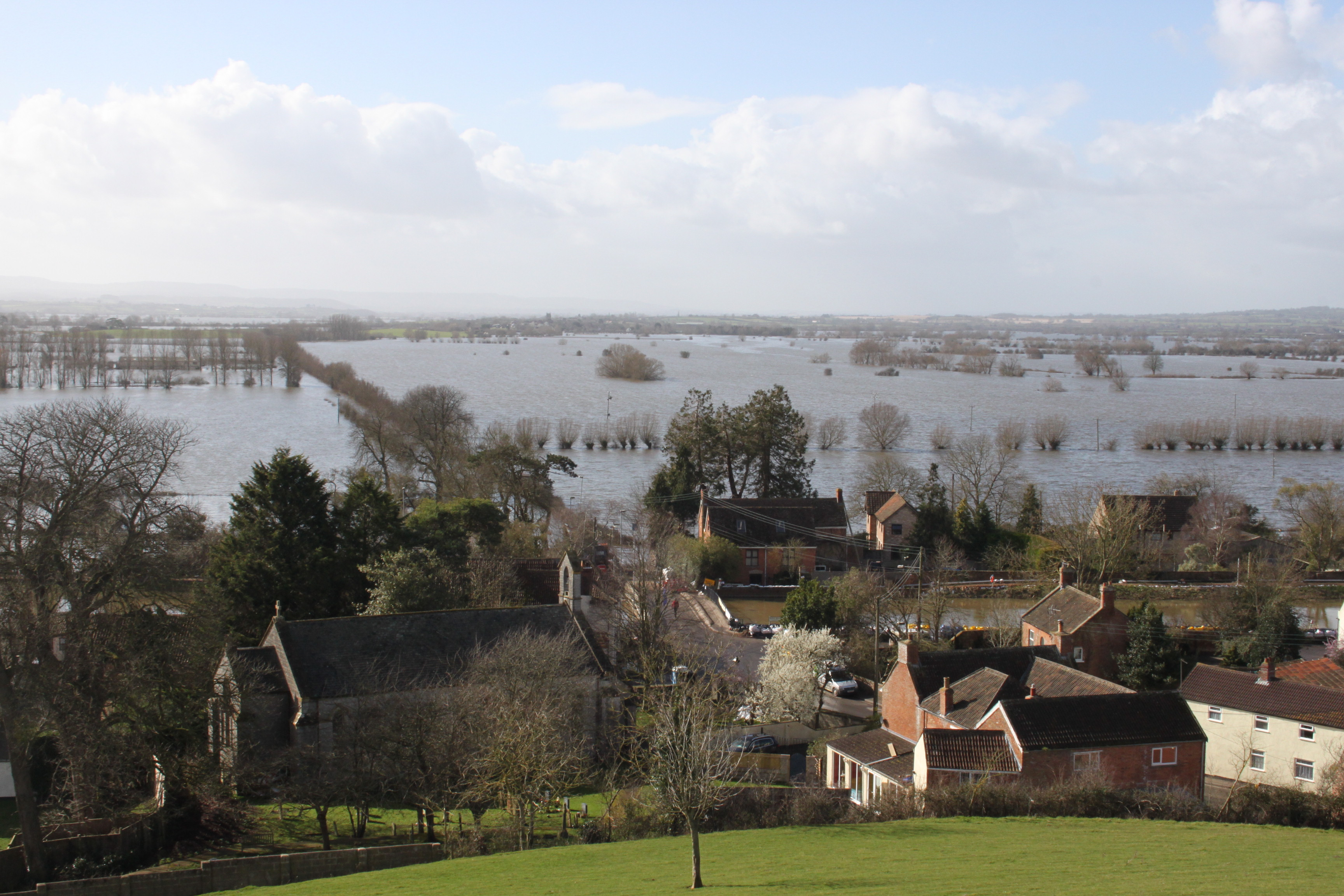
Burrowbridge, Somerset taken from Burrow Mump during flooding in Feb 2014

The parish council has responsibility for local issues, including setting an annual precept (local rate) to cover the council's operating costs and producing annual accounts for public scrutiny. The parish council evaluates local planning applications and works with the local police, district council officers and neighbourhood watch groups on matters of crime, security and traffic. The parish council's role also includes initiating projects for the maintenance and repair of parish facilities, as well as consulting with the district council on the maintenance, repair and improvement of highways, drainage, footpaths, public transport and street cleaning. Conservation matters (including trees and listed buildings) and environmental issues are also the responsibility of the council.

For local government purposes, since 1 April 2023, the village comes under the unitary authority of Somerset Council. Prior to this, it was part of the non-metropolitan district of Somerset West and Taunton (formed on 1 April 2019) and, before this, the district of Taunton Deane (established under the Local Government Act 1972). From 1894-1974, for local government purposes, Burrowbridge was part of Taunton Rural District.

The civil parish was created in the 1980s as the result of a Local Government Boundary Commission review. Originally, what is now the civil parish area was split between five separate parishes: Stoke St Gregory in Taunton Deane, and North Petherton, Westonzoyland, Middlezoy and Othery, all in Sedgemoor district. The parish council was first elected in 1985.

It is also part of the Taunton and Wellington county constituency represented in the House of Commons of the Parliament of the United Kingdom. It elects one Member of Parliament (MP) by the first-past-the-post system of electionand was part of the South West England constituency of the European Parliament prior to Britain leaving the European Union in January 2020, which elected six MEPs using the d'Hondt method of party-list proportional representation.

== People associated with Burrowbridge ==
- Alfred the Great
