= Chard Canal =

Canal in Somerset, England

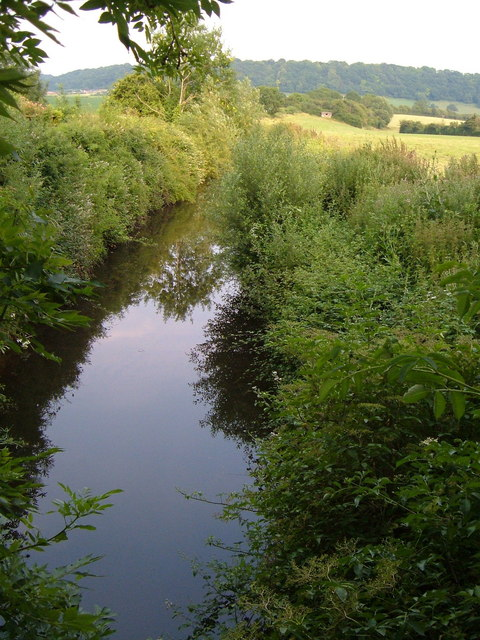
- The Chard Canal near Lillesdon, Somerset

Specifications
- Locks: 1 (4 inclined planes)
- Status: Derelict

History
- Original owner: Ashton Canal Co
- Principal engineer: James Green
- Other engineer: Sydney Hall
- Date of act: 1834
- Date completed: 1842
- Date closed: 1868

Geography
- Start point: Chard
- End point: Bridgwater
- Connects to: Bridgwater and Taunton Canal

The Chard Canal was a 13.5 miles (21.7 km) tub boat canal in Somerset, England, that ran from the Bridgwater and Taunton Canal at Creech St. Michael, over four aqueducts, through three tunnels and four inclined planes to Chard. It was completed in 1842, was never commercially viable, and closed in 1868. The major engineering features are still clearly visible in the landscape.

== Precursors ==
Prior to the construction of the canal, there had been several plans over the previous 50 years to build a ship canal from the Bristol Channel to the English Channel, in order to avoid the route around Cornwall and Devon. The first which would have connected Chard to the canal network was a scheme surveyed in 1769 by Robert Whitworth, to link the River Parrett to Seaton in Devon. Whitworth was asked to reassess this route in the early 1790s, and again thought it was feasible. The plan was revived in 1793, while another route was suggested in 1794 by Josiah Easton, again passing through Chard.

The 1793 Chard Canal plan was revived in 1809, by now renamed as the English and Bristol Channels Canal, and the engineer John Rennie was asked to survey it in 1810. He advocated a small ship canal, suitable for vessels up to 120 tons. The cost of a barge canal had been estimated at £70,000, but Rennie's estimate for a ship canal was £1.33 million.

One further attempt to build a ship canal took place in 1825, when a canal capable of taking vessels of 200 tons, with a draught of 15 feet (4.6 m) was proposed. 30 locks would have been required, on a canal from Stolford on the Bristol Channel to Beer on the English Channel, passing through Creech St Michael, Ilminster and Chard, at an estimated cost of £1.7 million. Thomas Telford produced the survey, an act of Parliament, the English and Bristol Channels Ship Canal Act 1825 (6 Geo. 4. c. cxcix) was obtained on 6 July 1825, and although subscriptions of over £1.5 million were promised, no further action occurred, with the company disappearing after 1828.

== History ==
Chard Canal Act 1834
- Act of Parliament
- Parliament of the United Kingdom
- Long title: An Act for making a navigable Canal from the Bridgewater and Taunton Canal in the Parish of Creech Saint Michael in the County of Somerset, and terminating in the Parish of Chard in the same County, with a collateral Cut therein described.
- Citation: 4 & 5 Will. 4. c. liii

Dates
- Royal assent: 16 June 1834

With the Bridgwater and Taunton Canal having opened in 1827, there was further initiative to link Chard to it, and James Green carried out a survey in 1831. The route was 13.5 miles (21.7 km) long, but with Chard some 231 feet (70 m) higher than the canal at Creech St Michael, his plan involved two boat lifts, two inclined planes and two tunnels, and was costed at £57,000. An act of Parliament, the Chard Canal Act 1834 (4 & 5 Will. 4. c. liii) was obtained in June 1834, authorising the raising of £57,000, with an additional £20,000 if required, but local enthusiasm for the scheme was muted and most of the capital was provided by just five men, all of whom were involved in the Bridgwater and Taunton Canal.

Work began at Wrantage in June 1835, but the act did not allow parts of the canal to be built until tunnelling was well-advanced, and so work on the upper sections did not start until Autumn 1837. Green was replaced as engineer by Sydney Hall from the start of construction, and in view of the problems Green was experiencing on the Grand Western Canal with commissioning his boat lifts, Hall decided to replace the lifts with inclined planes instead.

Chard Canal Company Act 1840
- Act of Parliament
- Parliament of the United Kingdom
- Long title: An Act to enable the Chard Canal Company to raise further Monies; and to amend the Act relating to the same Canal.
- Citation: 3 & 4 Vict. c. i

Dates
- Royal assent: 23 March 1840

Other legislation
- Amends: Chard Canal Act 1834

Chard Canal Act 1841
- Act of Parliament
- Parliament of the United Kingdom
- Long title: An Act to amend the Acts relating to the Chard Canal.
- Citation: 4 & 5 Vict. c. x

Dates
- Royal assent: 10 May 1841

Further changes to the original plans were made above Ilminster inclined plane, where another tunnel was constructed, enabling the line of the canal to be built at a lower level. A lock was added at Bere Mills, to raise the line by 7 feet (2.1 m) and the length of the Chard incline was increased. Construction costs were much higher than anticipated, and another act of Parliament, the Chard Canal Company Act 1840 (3 & 4 Vict. c. i) was obtained in March 1840, allowing the company to raise another £80,000 in shares, and to obtain a mortgage for £26,000, while a third act, the Chard Canal Act 1841 (4 & 5 Vict. c. x) allowed construction to continue beyond the original seven year limit. The canal opened to Ilminster on 15 May 1841, and to Dowlish Ford wharfs on 3 February 1842.

There were delays caused by the rope on the Wrantage plane breaking, resulting in damage to the caissons, and further delays caused by the Bristol and Exeter Railway constructing their line under the canal at Creech, but the work was finally completed on 24 May 1842. There were immediate benefits to the community, as coal prices fell, but the total cost of construction had been about £140,000, and as income was only a third of what had been projected, the canal company was never able to meet even the interest payments on its debts.

== Operation ==
The canal was designed for tub-boats which were 26 by 6.5 feet (7.9 by 2.0 m). The inclines at Thornfalcon, Wrantage and Ilminster were double-acting inclines, consisting of two parallel tracks, each containing a six-wheeled caisson, in which the boats floated. A chain linked the two caissons together, passing round a horizontal drum situated at the top of the incline. Power for the movement of the boats was provided by over-filling the top caisson, the extra weight causing that caisson to descend and the other to rise. Because the majority of traffic passed up the canal, and a boat displaces its own weight in water (Archimedes' principle), considerably more water passed down the incline than up it. However, the system was still more economical than using locks, and a large new Chard Reservoir supplied the necessary water.

The incline at Chard Common was quite different, consisting of a single track, with the tub-boats being carried on a cradle with four wheels. Power was supplied by a Whitelaw and Stirrat water turbine, with a 25-foot (7.6 m) head, which used 725 cubic feet (20.5 m^{3}) of water per minute. Boats were raised 86 feet (26 m) in a wheeled cradle up a slope of 1:10. The cradle was attached to the turbine by a substantial wire rope, after breakages of the original rope. The Ilminster tunnel was 14 feet (4.3 m) wide, allowing boats travelling in opposite directions to pass, but the tunnels at Lillesdon and Crimson Hill were only wide enough for one boat. However the Crimson Hill Tunnel has a double width "passing area" about halfway through its course to allow passing of the boats from either direction.

Chard Canal and Railway Act 1846
- Act of Parliament
- Parliament of the United Kingdom
- Long title: An Act to enable the Chard Canal Company to convert into a Railway the Portion of the Chard Canal from Creech Saint Michael to Ilminster, all in the County of Somerset.
- Citation: 9 & 10 Vict. c. ccxv

Dates
- Royal assent: 16 July 1846

Chard Railway Act 1847
- Act of Parliament
- Parliament of the United Kingdom
- Long title: An Act to enable the Chard Canal and Railway Company to extend their Railway from Ilminster to Chard, all in the County of Somerset.
- Citation: 10 & 11 Vict. c. clxxv

Dates
- Royal assent: 9 July 1847

Text of statute as originally enacted

The main cargoes were coal and stone. Traffic for the first three years rose from 25,835 tons to 33,284 tons, about two thirds of which was coal or culm (anthracite). Competition started immediately, with the railway arriving at Taunton in 1842, and the Westport Canal being completed in 1840. Attempts were made to convert the canal to a railway, and an act of Parliament, the Chard Railway Act 1847 (10 & 11 Vict. c. clxxv) changed the name of the company to the Chard Railway Company, but successive plans were thwarted by the inability of the company to repay its debts.

Chard Railway Act 1860
- Act of Parliament
- Parliament of the United Kingdom
- Long title: An Act to authorize the Construction of a Railway from the authorized Line of the London and South-western Exeter Extension Railway to Chard in the County of Somerset.
- Citation: 23 & 24 Vict. c. lxiv

Dates
- Royal assent: 25 May 1860

Text of statute as originally enacted

The canal went into receivership in 1853, after which there were discussions with the Bristol and Exeter Railway and the London and South Western Railway, with a view to building a branch to Chard. A new Chard Railway Company was constituted by the Chard Railway Act 1860 (23 & 24 Vict. c. lxiv), and another company was formed by the Chard and Taunton Railway Act 1861 (24 & 25 Vict. c. ccxliii), to construct a branch from Taunton to Chard. The London and South Western Railway took over the Chard Railway, and the Bristol and Exeter Railway built the branch from Taunton to Chard.

In order to prevent competition from the L&SWR, the Bristol and Exeter Railway bought the Grand Western Canal, the Bridgwater and Taunton Canal and the Chard Canal, so that the L&SWR could not. They paid £5,945 for the Chard Canal, with the takeover and closing of the canal being authorised by the Bristol and Exeter Railway Act 1867 (30 & 31 Vict. c. cxxx). The receivers were discharged in February 1868, and it seems likely that the canal was closed then.

== Remains ==
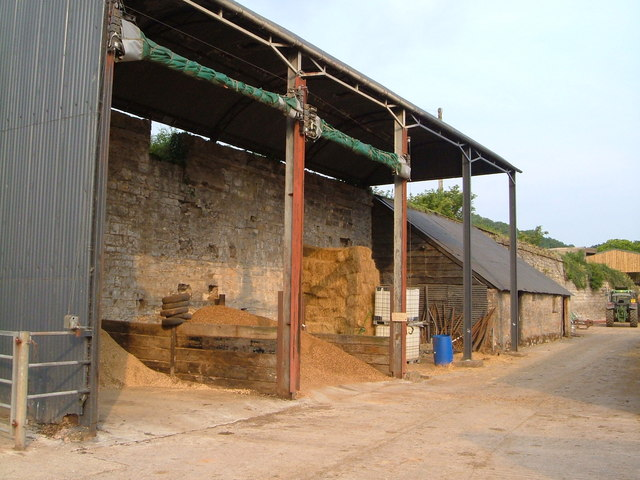
The canal aqueduct at Wrantage now supports farm buildings

The Chard reservoir, which was the main supply for the canal, was sold to Lord Poulett. In 1990, South Somerset District Council bought it, and it is now a designated nature reserve. Surrounded by woodland, it provides habitat for over 150 species of birds. The remains of the inclines have survived over 140 years of neglect, as have the three tunnels. Near Lower Farm, a bridge on the Thornfalcon to Creech road is now a grade II listed structure, and the three-arched aqueduct which carried the canal over the River Tone is largely intact, although it no longer has its parapets.

During World War II part of the Taunton Stop Line invasion defence project ran along the canal.

== Co-ordinates ==
Point	Coordinates (Links to map resources)	OS Grid Ref	Notes
Taunton Junction	51.025°N 3.042°W	ST269256	Junction with Bridgwater and Taunton Canal
Ruishton Aqueduct	51.020°N 3.040°W	ST271250	
Thornfalcon Plane	51.012°N 3.026°W	ST280241	28 ft (8.5m), counterbalanced caissons
Lillesdon Tunnel	51.006°N 3.004°W	ST296234	314 yd (287m)
Wrantage Aqueduct	50.998°N 2.987°W	ST308225	
Wrantage Plane	50.994°N 2.984°W	ST310220	27.5 ft (8.4m), counterbalanced caissons
Crimson Hill Tunnel N	50.995°N 2.975°W	ST316221	1800 yd (1.6km)
Crimson Hill Tunnel S	50.982°N 2.964°W	ST324207	1800 yd (1.6km)
Ilminster Plane	50.924°N 2.917°W	ST356142	82.5 ft (25.2m), counterbalanced caissons
Ilminster Tunnel	50.921°N 2.914°W	ST358138	300 yd (275m)
Bere Mills Lock	50.906°N 2.923°W	ST351122	7 ft (2.1m) rise
Chard Common Plane	50.886°N 2.937°W	ST340100	86 ft (26.2m), single track carriage
Chard Basin	50.879°N 2.954°W	ST329092	

== See also ==
- Canals of the United Kingdom
- History of the British canal system

== Bibliography ==
- Dunning, Robert (1983). A History of Somerset. Chichester: Phillimore & Co. ISBN 978-0-85033-461-6.
- Hadfield, Charles (1967). The Canals of South West England. David and Charles. ISBN 978-0-7153-4176-6.
- Otter, R.A. (1994). Civil Engineering Heritage: Southern England. London: Thomas Telford Ltd. ISBN 978-0-7277-1971-3.
- Russell, Ronald (1971). Lost canals of England and Wales. David and Charles. ISBN 978-0-7153-5417-9.
