= Parrett Navigation Company =

Trading company in 19th century England

Parrett Navigation and Canal Act 1836
- Act of Parliament
- Parliament of the United Kingdom
- Long title: An Act for improving the Navigation of a Portion of the River Parrett, and for making a Navigable Canal from the said River to Barrington, all in the County of Somerset.
- Citation: 6 & 7 Will. 4. c. ci
- Territorial extent: United Kingdom

Dates
- Royal assent: 4 July 1836

Other legislation
- Relates to: Grand Western Canal Act 1812

Text of statute as originally enacted

The Parrett Navigation Company was formed to improve river navigation on the River Parrett, Ivelchester and Langport Navigation and linked waterways. Tolls were introduced to pay for the improvements. It was a trading company owned by Vincent Stuckey and Walter Bagehot.

The company was formed by the Parrett Navigation and Canal Act 1836 (6 & 7 Will. 4. c. ci), prior to this maintenance of the banks had been the responsibility of the riparian owners (frontagers) under the authority of the county commissioners. The act authorised improvements to the River Parrett below Langport, the construction of a canal to Westport.

Parrett Navigation Act 1839
- Act of Parliament
- Parliament of the United Kingdom
- Long title: An Act for granting further Powers to the Company of Proprietors of the Parrett Navigation.
- Citation: 2 & 3 Vict. c. xxxvii

Dates
- Royal assent: 14 June 1839

Text of statute as originally enacted

The act gave the newly formed Parrett Navigation Company powers to raise £10,500 by the issuing of shares, and an additional £3,300 from a mortgage if required. The engineer for the whole scheme was William Gravatt, who had previously worked on the Bristol and Exeter Railway, and he was assisted locally by Charles Hodgkinson. The cost of the initial work on the River Parrett exceeded the budget, and a second act of Parliament, the Parrett Navigation Act 1839 (2 & 3 Vict. c. xxxvii) was obtained to allow the company to raise another £20,000 and to increase the tolls. Local merchants sought to oppose the increase by opposing the bill, but Benjamin Lovibond, who was acting for them at the House of Commons, produced a petition, which was investigated by a select committee and found to be forged.

In 1839 they demolished the nine arch Great Bow Bridge and replaced it with the present bridge to allow larger boats to travel beyond Langport. Normal canal tolls were charged for use of the canal, and there was a toll for trade passing under the rebuilt bridge, but some of the shareholders felt that boat users on the River Ivel (also known as the River Yeo should also be charged, since the water levels on the river had improved since the construction of the Parrett Navigation works.

The Bristol and Exeter Railway opened in late 1853, and the effects on the navigation were immediate, with receipts dropping from £1,440 in 1853 to £673 by 1857. The company paid its final dividend in 1872. In 1875, parts of Westmoor were flooded, as a result of the company being unable to repair the culvert under the river at Huish Bridge, and Mr Thomas Mead opened the Langport lock gates to lower the upstream water levels. The company had no option but to stop collecting tolls, and the gates were still open in 1877. On 1 July 1878 the Somersetshire Drainage Act was passed by Parliament, providing for the transfer of the navigation to the Drainage Commissioners at no cost, with options to abandon any or all of the navigation.

In the 1870s navigation works ceased, the company became insolvent, and the company's property was given to the Somersetshire Drainage Commissioners.
