= River Yeo (South Somerset) =

River in north Dorset and south Somerset, England

River Yeo River Ivel
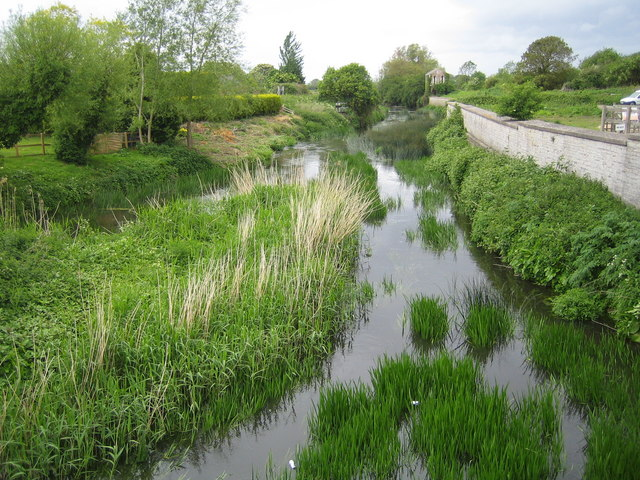
- River Yeo in Ilchester
- Etymology: Celtic river-name gifl 'forked river'. Old English ēa 'river'

Location
- Country: England
- Counties: Dorset, Somerset
- Towns: Sherborne, Bradford Abbas, Yeovil, Mudford, Yeovilton, Ilchester

Physical characteristics
- Source: https://somersetrivers.uk/somerset-rivers/south-somerset-rivers/river-yeo/
  - location: Henstridge Bowden, South Somerset
  - coordinates: 50°58′55″N 2°26′26″W
- Mouth: River Parrett
  - location: Langport, South Somerset, Somerset, England
  - coordinates: 51°01′51″N 2°49′29″W
- Length: 15 mi (24 km)

Basin features
- Tributaries
  - left: Bearley Brook
  - right: Trent Brook

The River Yeo, also known as the River Ivel, is a tributary of the River Parrett in north Dorset and south Somerset, England.

The river's names derive from the Celtic river-name gifl 'forked river'. The name Yeo appears to have been influenced by Old English ēa 'river'.

The river rises in the North Dorset Downs region. It flows through the town of Sherborne and Sherborne Lake in north Dorset, and the Somerset towns of Yeovil, Yeovilton and Ilchester, to which it gives its name, and joins the River Parrett near Langport. For a few miles east of Yeovil, it forms the county boundary between Somerset and Dorset.

The river is navigable for light craft for 8 miles (13 km) from the Parrett to Ilchester.

The Yeo's tributaries include the River Gascoigne, which rises near Milborne Wick and joins the Yeo near Sherborne, the River Wriggle, Trent Brook, Hornsey Brook, the River Cam and Bearley Brook.
