= List of locations in the Somerset Levels =

The Somerset Levels, or Somerset Levels and Moors, are a low-lying coastal plain and wetland area in the north and centre of Somerset, England, which has been artificially drained and modified to allow productive farming. The following is a list of locations in the Somerset Levels.

== Settlements ==
- Aller
- Alhampton
- Andersea
- Athelney
- Baltonsborough
- Banwell
- Barrow (North/South)
- Bawdrip
- Berrow
- Biddisham
- Blackford, near Wedmore
- Bleadon
- Bourton
- Brent Knoll
- Bridgwater
- Burnham-on-Sea
- Burrowbridge
- Burtle
- Butleigh
- Catcott
- Catsham
- Claverham
- Chapel Allerton
- Cheddar
- Chilton Polden
- Cocklake
- Cossington
- Curry Rivel
- Dunball
- Draycott
- Drayton
- Edington
- Foddington
- Glastonbury
- Greinton
- Highbridge
- Huish Episcopi
- Huntspill (East/West)
- Ilchester
- Langport
- Long Load
- Lovington
- Lympsham
- Mark
- Meare
- Midelney
- Middlezoy
- Moorlinch
- Muchelney
- Nailsea
- North Curry
- Northmoor Green
- Nythe
- Oath
- Othery
- Pathe
- Pawlett
- Pedwell
- Podimore
- Puriton
- Rackley
- Rooks Bridge
- Shapwick
- Sharpham
- Somerton
- Southway
- Stathe
- Stawell
- Steart
- Sticklinch
- Stoke St Gregory
- Street
- Thorney
- Yatton
- Yeovil Marsh
- Weare
- Wedmore
- Westhay
- Weston-super-Mare
- Westonzoyland
- Wick St Lawrence
- Wookey
- Woolavington

== Areas ==
- Aller and Beer Woods
- Aller Hill
- Aller Moor
- Allerton Moor
- Ascott Heath
- Bleadon Level
- Burnham Level
- Butleigh Moor
- Butt Moor
- Cary Moor
- Catcott, Edington and Chilton Moors SSSI
- Catcott Heath
- Catcott Lows
- Cheddar Moor
- Crannel Moor
- Curry and Hay Moors
- Draycott Moor
- Earlake Moor
- Edington Heath
- Glastonbury Heath
- Godney Moor
- Ham Wall
- Hearty Moor
- Holly Moor
- Horsey Level
- Huntspill Level
- Huntspill Moor
- Kennard Moor
- Kings Moor
- King's Sedgemoor
- Knowle Moor
- Lower Salt Moor
- Mark Moor
- Meare Heath
- Meare Pool
- Middle Moor
- Monk Moor
- Moorlinch SSSI
- Muchelney Level
- North Curry Meadow
- North Moor
- Oxmoor
- Panborough Moor
- Perry Moor
- Pill Moor
- Puriton Level
- Queen's Sedgemoor
- Rise Moor
- Shapwick Heath
- Shapwick Moor
- Sharpham Moor Plot
- Somerton Moor
- South Moor
- Southlake Moor
- Splotts Moor
- Stan Moor
- Stock Moor
- Stoke Moor
- Tealham and Tadham Moors
- Thorney Moor
- Walton Heath
- Wedmoor Moor
- West Sedgemoor
- Westbury Moor
- Westhay Heath
- Westhay Level
- Westhay Moor
- Weston Level
- West Moor SSSI
- Wet Moor
- Woolavington Level

== Rivers ==
- Bearley Brook
- Black Ditch
- Cannington Brook
- Chinnock Water
- Cobb's Cross Stream
- Decoy Rhine
- Eighteen Foot Rhine
- Hamp Brook
- Horsey Pill
- King's Sedgemoor Drain
- Lopen Brook
- Lox Yeo
- North Drain
- North Moor Main Drain
- Oldbridge River
- Pillrow Cut
- River Axe
- River Banwell
- River Brue
- River Cam
- River Cary
- River Huntspill
- River Isle
- River Parrett
- River Sheppey
- River Tone
- River Yeo (Ivel)
- Sedgemoor Old Rhine
- South Drain
- Sowy River
- Whitelake River

== Railway stations ==
- Highbridge and Burnham railway station
- Bridgwater railway station
