= Westmoor =

Westmoor can mean:

- Westmoor, Indiana, United States, a neighborhood in the city of Fort Wayne
- A common spelling of West Moor, a village in Tyne and Wear, United Kingdom
- Westmoor High School, an American public high school in Daly City, California

== Not to be confused with ==
- West Moor SSSI, Somerset, a Site of Special Scientific Interest in the United Kingdom
