= King's Sedgemoor =

- Site of Special Scientific Interest
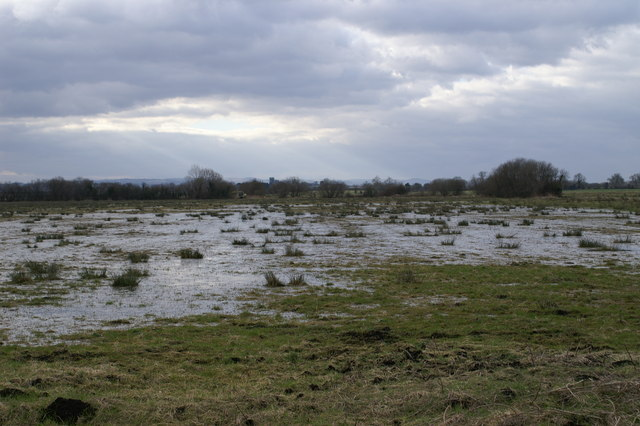

- Location within Somerset
- Location of King's Sedgemoor.
- Area of search: Somerset
- Grid reference: ST400330
- Coordinates: 51.09316°N 2.85815°W
- Interest: Biological
- Area: 822 hectares (8.22 km^{2}; 3.17 sq mi)
- Notification date: 1985

King's Sedgemoor is a piece of rich animal habitat and farming land, that forms part of the Somerset Levels and Moors in South West England.

The area of King's Sedgemoor fell within the Whitley Hundred.

It is a Site of Special Scientific Interest, at the centre of the larger Altcar series peat basin of King’s Sedgemoor; lying between the Sowy River to the west, Cradle Bridge to the east and extending to the south over Beer Wall into part of Aller Moor. It is adjacent to the Greylake SSSI.

King's Sedgemoor Drain, originally constructed in 1797–8, proved inadequate for draining the village of Chedzoy's moors, so in 1861 the Chedzoy Internal Drainage District built a small pumping station on the River Parrett, in Westonzoyland parish, to drain the Chedzoy moors southwards.
