= Willows and Wetlands Visitor Centre =

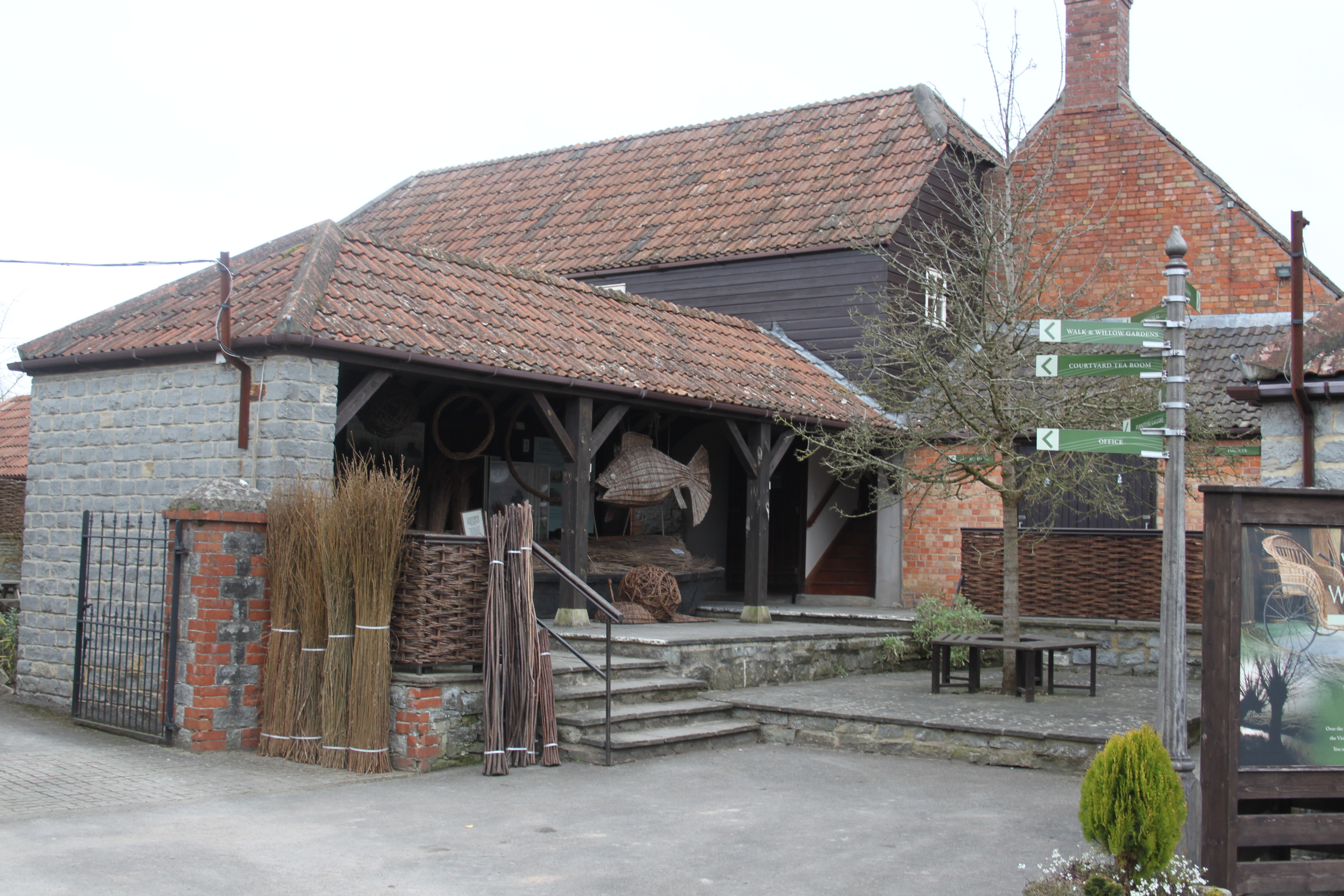

- Location within Somerset and the United Kingdom
- Established: 1987
- Location: Stoke St Gregory, Somerset Levels
- Coordinates: 51°02′35″N 2°56′08″W
- Website: Centre web site

The Willows and Wetlands Visitor Centre is situated at Stoke St Gregory, on the Somerset Levels, north east of Taunton, England. Based on a working farm, growing and processing willow, the centre offers tours of over 80 acres (0.13 sq mi) of withies, willow yards and basket workshops and explains the place of willow in the history of the Levels.

== History ==
The centre is run and owned by the Coate family who have been growing willow on the Somerset Levels since 1819 and making baskets since 1904. During the Victorian era wicker furniture became popular as it was believed to be more sanitary, collecting less dust when compared to upholstery. Large numbers of people were employed, some as "outworkers" processing the willow in their own homes. The company has remained in the same family since.

Several varieties of willow are grown on the 70 acres (28 ha), the majority being Salix triandra The willow is then cut and processed to produce different colours. The willow is boiled and then the bark removed. Bark removal was originally carried out by hand but is now mechanised.

In addition to willow for basket making, the company also uses it to make Charcoal, which is sold under their own label and for other brands since the 1960s.

The centre was opened by David Bellamy in 1987. Particular efforts have been made to ensure the museum is accessible to those with visual and mobility impairments.

== Exhibits ==
It features exhibits relating to Willow growing and processing and basket-making and includes a video room describing willow growing and basket making; a basket museum with displays of traditional and unusual willow artefacts; the Levels and Moors Exhibition describing the history of the local countryside and its links with this traditional industry; and an environmental interpretation display highlighting the importance of water in shaping the Somerset Levels.

Guided tours are available which demonstrate the stages in the processing of the willow and the creation of wicker work, but visitors are free to wander through the fields along the banks of the River Tone. Close to one of the paths is a wooden carved sculpture by Louise Baker celebrating the importance of the willow in the industry of the Levels.
