= Somerset Levels =

Coastal plain and wetland area of Somerset, England

Coordinates: 51.19°N 2.96°W

Designations

Ramsar Wetland
- Official name: Somerset Levels and Moors
- Designated: 26 June 1997
- Reference no.: 914

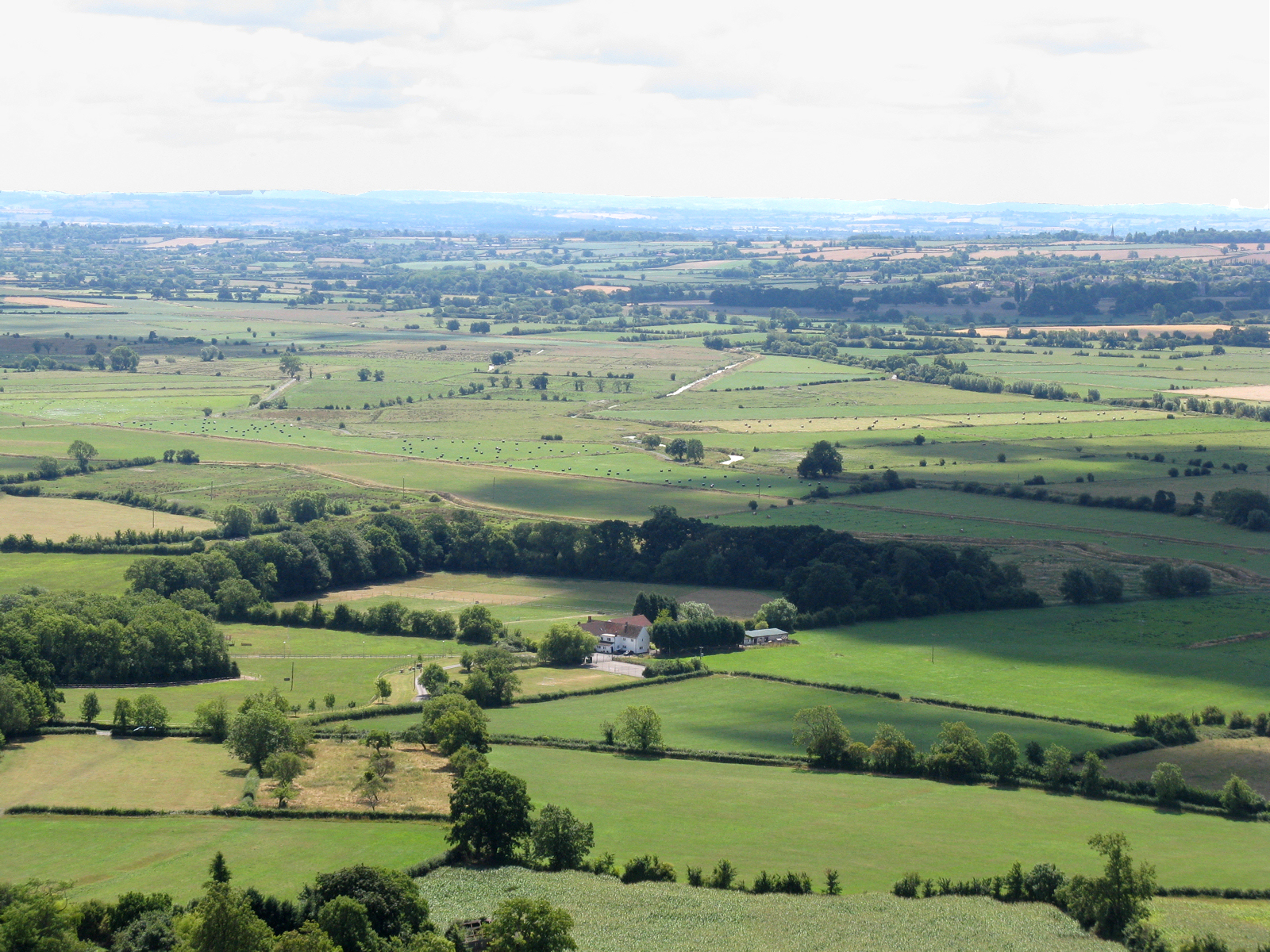
The Somerset Levels, seen from Glastonbury Tor

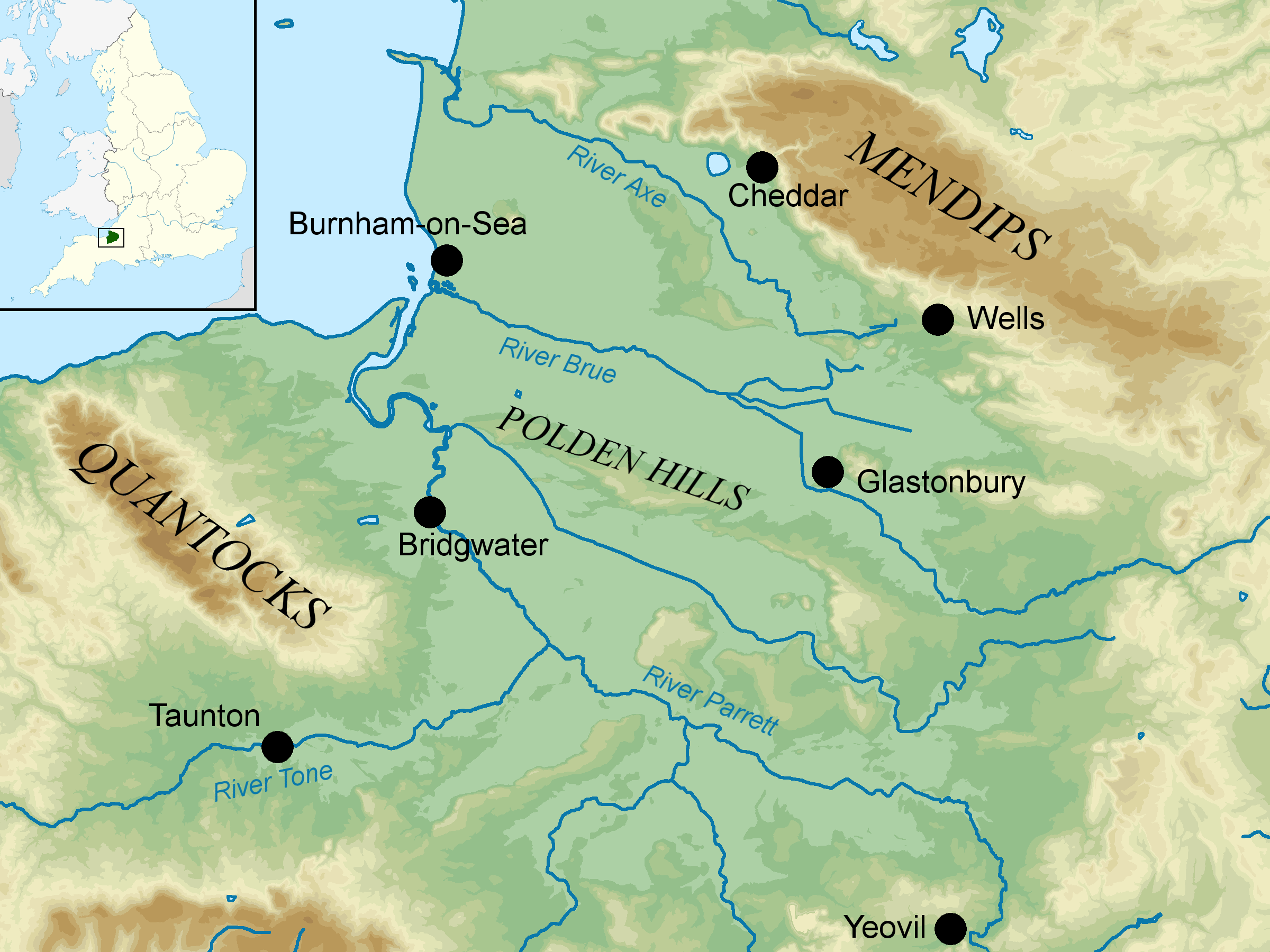
Map showing the Somerset Levels and the surrounding area. The major hill ranges and rivers are shown. Height (m) 0–20 20–40 40–60 60–80 80–100 100–120 120–140 140–160 160–180 180–200 200–230 230–260 260–300 300–384 Source: Ordnance Survey OpenData

The Somerset Levels are a coastal plain and wetland area of Somerset, England, running south from the Mendips to the Blackdown Hills.

The Somerset Levels have an area of about 160,000 acres (650 km^{2}) and are bisected by the Polden Hills; the areas to the south are drained by the River Parrett, and the areas to the north by the rivers Axe and Brue. The Mendip Hills separate the Somerset Levels from the North Somerset Levels. The Somerset Levels consist of marine clay "levels" along the coast and inland peat-based "moors"; agriculturally, about 70 per cent is used as grassland and the rest is arable. Willow and teazel are grown commercially and peat is extracted.

A Palaeolithic flint tool found in West Sedgemoor is the earliest indication of human presence in the area. The Neolithic people exploited the reed swamps for their natural resources and started to construct wooden trackways, including the world's oldest known timber trackway, the Post Track, dating from about 3800 BC. The Levels were the location of the Glastonbury Lake Village as well as two Lake villages at Meare Lake. Several settlements and hill forts were built on the natural "islands" of slightly raised land, including Brent Knoll and Glastonbury. In the Roman period sea salt was extracted and a string of settlements were set up along the Polden Hills. The 1998 discovery at Shapwick of 9,238 silver Roman coins, known as the Shapwick Hoard, was the second-largest ever found from the time of the Roman Empire. A number of Saxon charters document the incorporation of areas of moor in estates. In 1685, the Battle of Sedgemoor was fought in the Bussex area of Westonzoyland at the conclusion of the Monmouth Rebellion.

As a result of the wetland nature of the Levels, the area contains a rich biodiversity of national and international importance. It supports a vast variety of plant and bird species and is an important feeding ground for birds and includes 32 Sites of Special Scientific Interest, of which 12 are also Special Protection Areas. The area has been extensively studied for its biodiversity and heritage, and has a growing tourism industry.

People have been draining the area since before Domesday Book. In the Middle Ages, the monasteries of Glastonbury, Athelney and Muchelney were responsible for much of the drainage. The artificial Huntspill River was constructed during the Second World War as a reservoir, although it also serves as a drainage channel. The Sowy River between the River Parrett and King's Sedgemoor Drain was completed in 1972; water levels are managed by the Levels internal drainage boards. During 2009 and 2010 proposals to build a series of electricity pylons by one of two routes between Hinkley Point and Avonmouth, to transmit electricity from the proposed Hinkley Point C nuclear power station, attracted local opposition. Discussions have taken place concerning the possibility of obtaining World Heritage Site status for the Somerset Levels as a "cultural landscape". It was suggested that if this bid were successful it could improve flood control, but only if wetland fens were created again; the plans were abandoned in 2010.

== Natural character area ==
The Somerset Levels form a natural region that has been designated as a national character area – No. 142 – by Natural England, the public body responsible for England's natural environment. Neighbouring natural regions are: the Vale of Taunton and Quantock Fringes to the west, the Blackdowns to the southwest, the Mid Somerset Hills and Yeovil Scarplands to the southeast, the Mendip Hills to the east and the Bristol, Avon Valleys and Ridges to the northeast.

== Geography ==
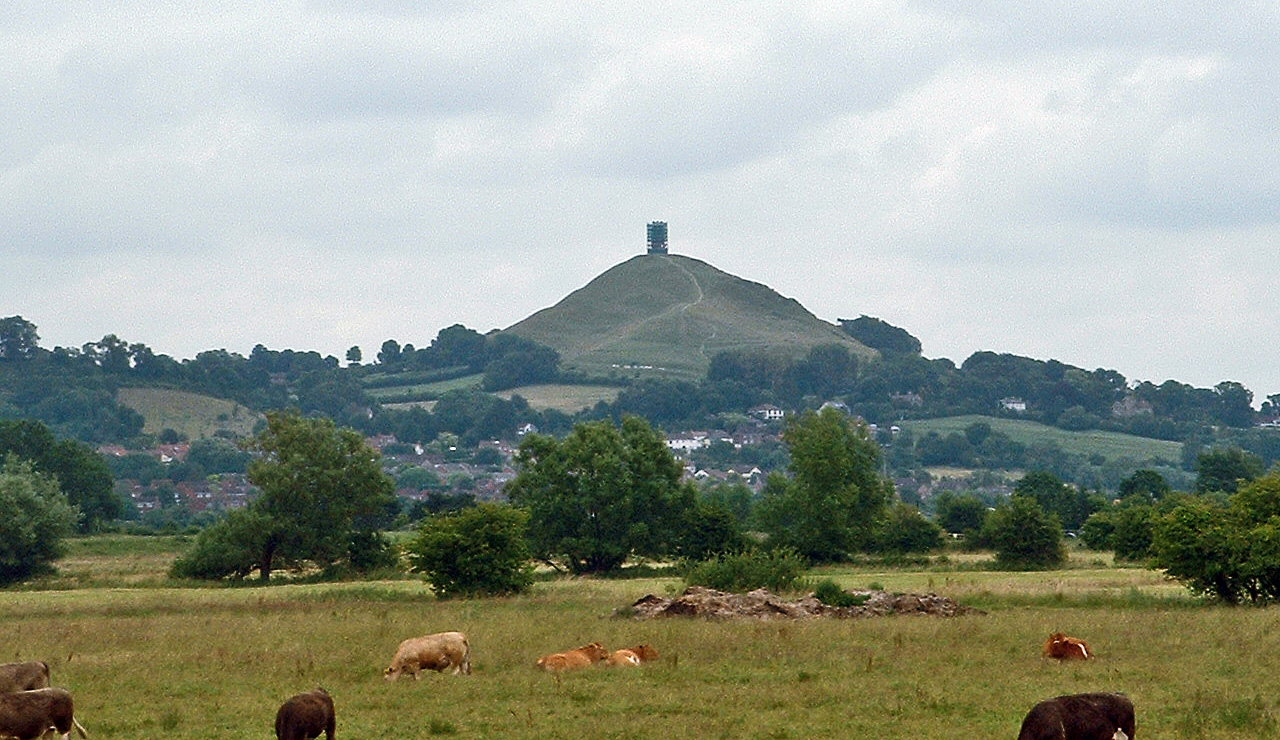
Glastonbury Tor

The Levels are mainly flat areas of inland plains and a coastal sand and clay barrier, east and west of the M5 motorway. There are some slightly raised parts, called "burtles", as well as higher ridges and hills. The Levels are about 20 feet (6 m) above mean sea level (O.D.). The general elevation inland is 10 to 12 feet (3 to 4 m) O.D. with peak tides of 25 to 26 feet (8 to 8 m) O.D. recorded at Bridgwater and Burnham-on-Sea. Large areas of peat were laid down in the Brue Valley during the Quaternary period after the ice sheets melted. The area's topography consists of two basins mainly surrounded by hills, the runoff from which forms rivers that originally meandered across the plain but have now been controlled by embanking and clyses (the local name for a sluice). The area is prone to winter floods of fresh water and occasional salt water inundations. The worst in recorded history was the Bristol Channel floods of 1607, which resulted in the drowning of an estimated 2,000 or more people, houses and villages swept away, an estimated 200 square miles (500 km^{2}) of farmland inundated, and livestock killed. Another severe flood occurred in 1872–1873, when over 107 square miles (300 km^{2}) were under water from October to March.

Although underlain by much older Triassic age formations that protrude to form what would once have been islands—such as Athelney, Brent Knoll, Burrow Mump and Glastonbury Tor—the lowland landscape was formed only during the last 10,000 years, following the end of the last ice age. Glastonbury Tor is composed of Upper Lias Sand. The Poldens and the Isle of Wedmore are composed of Blue Lias and Marl, while the Mendips are largely Carboniferous limestone. Although sea level changes since the Pliocene led to changes in sea level and the laying down of vegetation, the peak of the peat formation took place in swamp conditions around 6,000 years ago, although in some areas it continued into medieval times.

It is a mainly agricultural region, typically with open fields of permanent grass surrounded by ditches with willow trees. Access to individual areas, especially for cattle, was provided by means of "droves", i.e. green lanes, leading off the public highways. Some of the old roads, in contrast to the old hollow ways found in other areas of England, are causeways raised above the level of the surrounding land, with a drainage ditch running along each side.

=== Settlements ===
Settlements and places of interest on the Levels

Most of the settlements on the Levels are small villages. In the south, Aller, which has a population of 374, includes the hamlet of Beer (sometimes Bere) and the deserted medieval village of Oath on the opposite bank of the River Parrett. The area known as the Isle of Athelney was once a very low isolated island linked by a causeway to East Lyng, each end of which was protected by a semi-circular stockade and ditch. The ditch on the island is now known to date from the Iron Age, and was used by Alfred the Great as a fort before the Battle of Ethandun in May 878; in gratitude for his victory Alfred founded a monastery, Athelney Abbey, on the Isle in 888, which survived until the Dissolution of the Monasteries under Henry VIII in 1539. Bawdrip is a small village which has a population of 498. Brent Knoll is a large village at the foot of 449-foot (137 m) Brent Knoll Camp that dominates the surrounding landscape; the name means Beacon Hill in Old English. Brent Knoll has been inhabited since at least the Bronze Age. Before the Somerset Levels were drained, Brent Knoll was an island known as the Isle (or Mount) of Frogs.

Glastonbury (population 8,784) and Street (11,066) lie on opposite sides of the River Brue, and provide a central point for trade and commerce. Larger centres are generally on slightly higher ground around the edges of the Levels. Bridgwater is a market town, the administrative centre of the Sedgemoor district, and a major industrial centre. With a population of 33,698, it straddles the major communication routes through South West England. Situated on the edge of the Somerset Levels, along both banks of the River Parrett and 10 miles (16 km) from its mouth, it was at one time a major port and trading centre. The hamlet of Dunball forms part of the port on the river. Burrowbridge lies on the River Parrett further inland. The name probably comes from the Old English buruh (fortified hill) and bryċġ (bridge). In the village is Burrow Mump, an ancient earthwork now owned by the National Trust. Burrow Mump is also known as St Michael's Borough or Tutteyate. It is a natural hill of Triassic sandstone capped by Keuper marl. Excavations showed evidence of a medieval masonry building on the top of the hill.

Along the coast, settlements such as Berrow are built on the line of sand dunes separating the low-lying marshes from the Bristol Channel. At the northern end Bleadon lies on the River Axe; and there was for many years a small harbour, sometimes known as Lympsham Wharf. The arrival of the Bristol and Exeter Railway in 1841, which crossed the Axe on a bridge, obstructed river traffic beyond the wharf, making it the limit of navigation for coastal vessels. An act of Parliament of 1915 authorised the drainage of the river and installation of a flood gate at Bleadon, although attempts to control the water had occurred on Bleadon Level since medieval times, including an early windmill, in 1613, to pump water into the sea from behind a sea wall. Burnham-on-Sea (population 18,401) is at the mouth of the River Parrett where it enters Bridgwater Bay. The position of the town on the edge of the Somerset Levels has resulted in a history dominated by land reclamation and sea defences since Roman times. Burnham was seriously affected by the Bristol Channel floods of 1607, and various flood defences have been installed since then. A concrete sea wall was built in 1911, and after the Second World War further additions to the defences were made, using the remains of a Mulberry harbour; the present curved concrete wall was completed in 1988. Highbridge, which neighbours Burnham, is near the mouth of the River Brue and the villages of East and West Huntspill.

=== Climate ===
Along with the rest of South West England the Somerset Levels have a temperate climate, which is generally wetter and milder than the rest of the country. The annual mean temperature is approximately 10 °C (50.0 °F). Seasonal temperature variation is less extreme than most of the United Kingdom because of the adjacent sea. The summer months of July and August are the warmest, with mean daily maxima of approximately 21 °C (69.8 °F). In winter, mean minimum temperatures of 1 or 2 °C (33.8 or 35.6 °F) are common. The Azores high pressure area influences the southwest of England's summer weather, but convective cloud sometimes forms inland, reducing the number of hours of sunshine. Annual sunshine rates are slightly less than the regional average of 1,600 hours. Most rainfall in the southwest is caused by convection or Atlantic depressions, which are most active in autumn and winter, when they are the chief cause of rain. In summer, a large proportion of the rainfall is caused by the Sun heating the land, leading to convection and to showers and thunderstorms. Average rainfall is around 700 mm (28 in), and about 8–15 days of snowfall is typical. November to March have the highest mean wind speeds, and June to August have the lightest winds. The predominant wind direction is from the southwest. It was devastated by the UK storms of January–February 2014.

Climate data for Yeovilton, 20 m asl (1991–2020 normals), extremes 1964-
Month	Jan	Feb	Mar	Apr	May	Jun	Jul	Aug	Sep	Oct	Nov	Dec	Year
Record high °C (°F)	16.1 (61.0)	17.7 (63.9)	21.3 (70.3)	25.4 (77.7)	27.5 (81.5)	33.6 (92.5)	35.0 (95.0)	34.9 (94.8)	29.9 (85.8)	26.5 (79.7)	18.5 (65.3)	16.0 (60.8)	35.0 (95.0)
Mean daily maximum °C (°F)	8.6 (47.5)	9.0 (48.2)	11.2 (52.2)	13.9 (57.0)	17.1 (62.8)	19.9 (67.8)	21.9 (71.4)	21.6 (70.9)	19.2 (66.6)	15.3 (59.5)	11.5 (52.7)	9.0 (48.2)	14.9 (58.8)
Daily mean °C (°F)	5.3 (41.5)	5.4 (41.7)	7.1 (44.8)	9.2 (48.6)	12.3 (54.1)	15.1 (59.2)	17.1 (62.8)	16.9 (62.4)	14.6 (58.3)	11.5 (52.7)	8.0 (46.4)	5.7 (42.3)	10.7 (51.3)
Mean daily minimum °C (°F)	2.0 (35.6)	1.8 (35.2)	3.0 (37.4)	4.5 (40.1)	7.4 (45.3)	10.3 (50.5)	12.2 (54.0)	12.2 (54.0)	10.0 (50.0)	7.6 (45.7)	4.4 (39.9)	2.3 (36.1)	6.5 (43.7)
Record low °C (°F)	−16.1 (3.0)	−12.2 (10.0)	−10.0 (14.0)	−6.4 (20.5)	−4.1 (24.6)	0.0 (32.0)	4.4 (39.9)	2.9 (37.2)	−1.8 (28.8)	−4.8 (23.4)	−8.0 (17.6)	−14.2 (6.4)	−16.1 (3.0)
Average precipitation mm (inches)	70.0 (2.76)	50.9 (2.00)	48.5 (1.91)	51.5 (2.03)	47.2 (1.86)	57.1 (2.25)	50.2 (1.98)	60.7 (2.39)	53.3 (2.10)	80.9 (3.19)	81.9 (3.22)	77.4 (3.05)	729.5 (28.72)
Average precipitation days (≥ 1.0 mm)	12.2	10.4	10.0	10.0	9.2	8.7	8.3	9.8	9.1	12.0	13.2	12.9	125.8
Mean monthly sunshine hours	59.5	79.5	121.6	170.5	202.2	199.8	205.3	185.5	149.2	107.6	71.6	53.5	1,605.7
Source 1: Met Office
Source 2: Starlings Roost Weather

== Water management ==
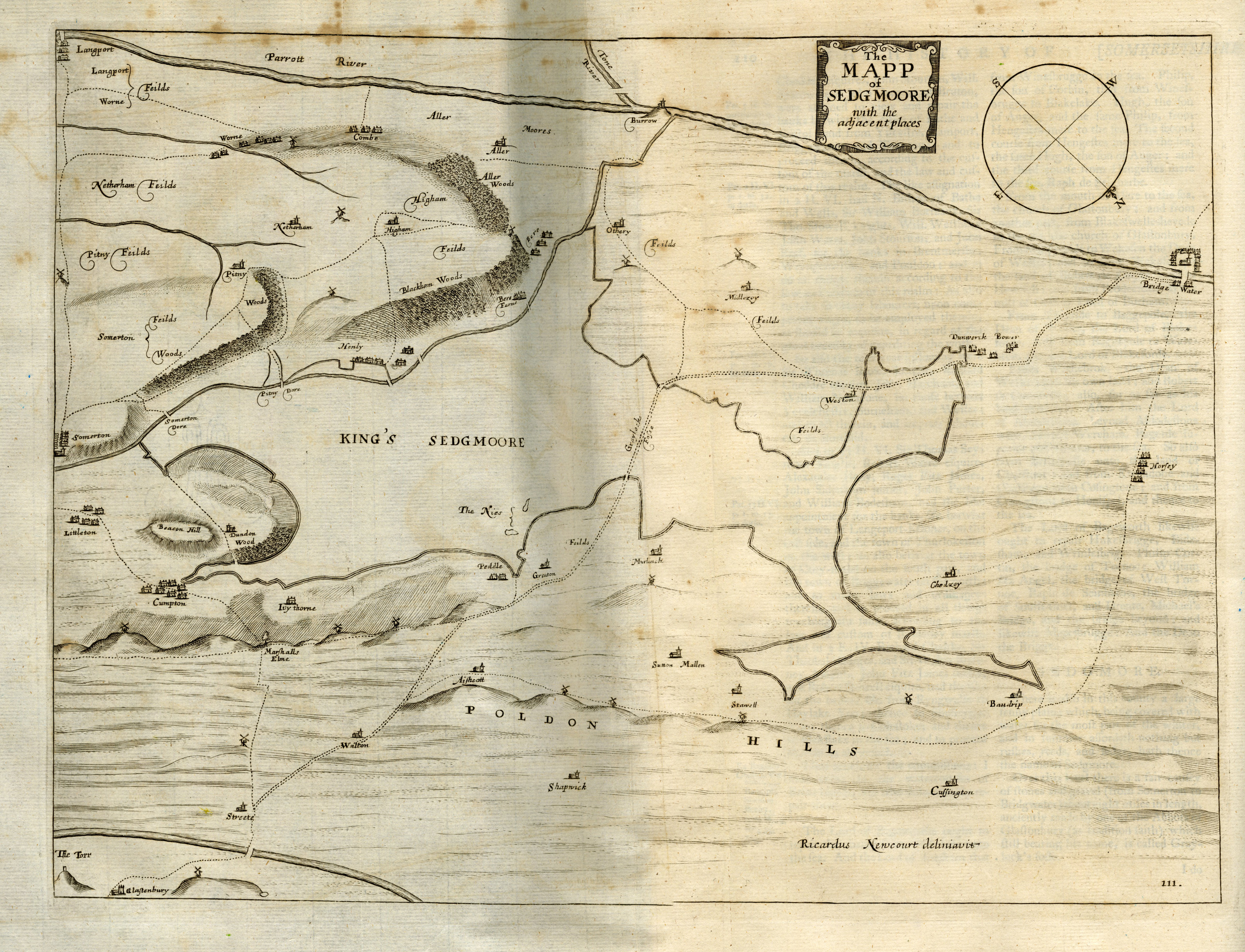
"The Map of Sedgemoor, with adjacent Parts" from "The history of imbanking and drayning" by William Dugdale (1662).

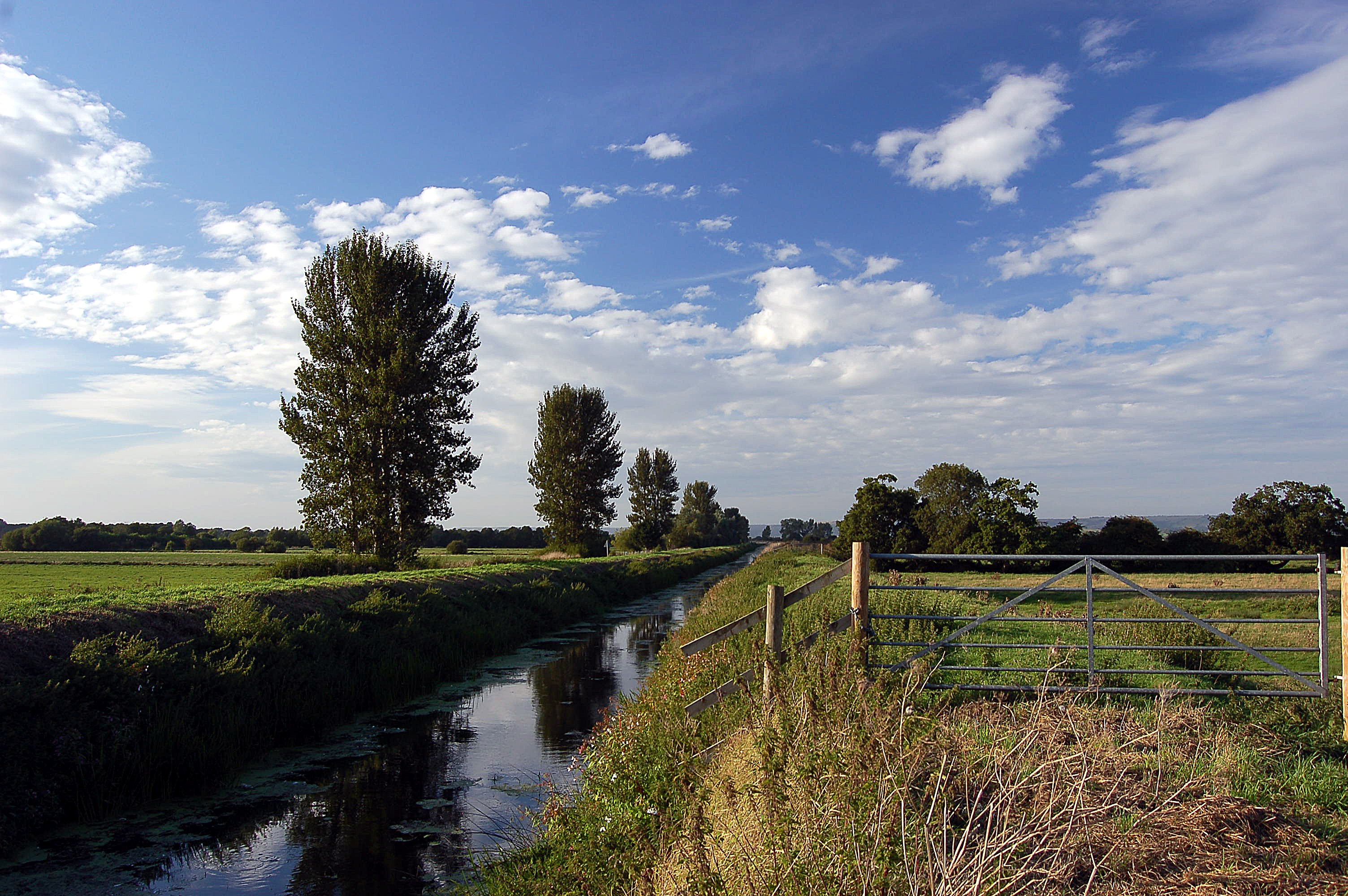
The River Brue in an artificial channel draining farmland near Glastonbury

The Moors and Levels, formed from a submerged and reclaimed landscape, consist of a coastal clay belt only slightly above mean sea level, with an inland peat belt at a lower level behind it.

Early attempts to control the water levels were possibly made by the Romans (although records only date from the 13th century), but were not widespread.

There was a port at Bleadney on the River Axe in the 8th century which allowed goods to be brought to within 3 miles (5 km) of Wells. In 1200, a wharf was constructed at Rackley near Axbridge. The Parrett was navigable up as far as Langport in 1600, with 15 to 20 ton barges. The Domesday Book recorded that drainage of the higher grounds was under way, although the moors at Wedmoor were said to be useless.

In the Middle Ages, the monasteries of Glastonbury, Athelney, and Muchelney were responsible for much of the drainage. In 1129, the Abbot of Glastonbury was recorded as inspecting enclosed land at Lympsham. Efforts to control flooding on the Parrett were recorded around the same date. In 1234, 722 acres (2.9 km^{2}) were reclaimed near Westonzoyland and, from the accounts in the abbey's rent books, this had increased to 972 acres (393 ha) by 1240.

=== Drains ===
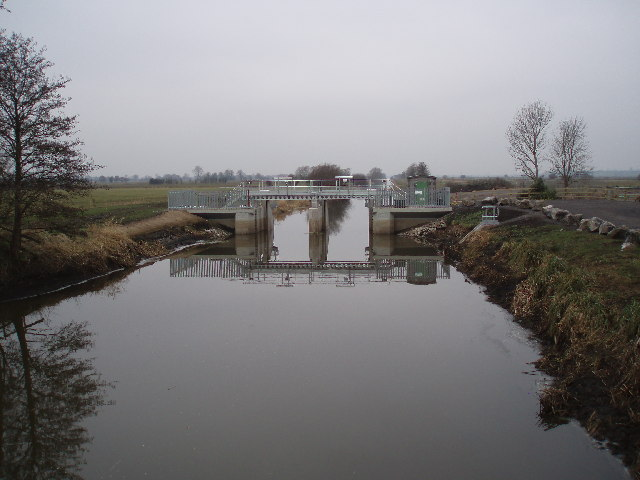
Greylake sluice on King's Sedgemoor Drain

Flooding of adjacent moor land was partially addressed during the 13th century by the construction of a number of embankment walls to contain the Parrett. They included Southlake Wall, Burrow Wall, and Lake Wall. The River Tone was also diverted by the Abbot of Athelney and other land owners into a new embanked channel, joining the Parrett upstream from its original confluence.

The main drainage outlets flowing through the Moors and Levels are the rivers Axe, Brue, Huntspill, Parrett, Tone, and Yeo, together with the King's Sedgemoor Drain, an artificial channel into which the River Cary now runs. Previously, the Cary ran into the Tone while the Brue ran through Meare Pool (now drained) and the Panborough Gap, and then into the Axe. Another accomplishment in the Middle Ages was the construction of the tidal Pillrow Cut, joining the Brue and Axe.

In 1500, there was said to be 70,000 acres (283 km^{2}) of floodable land of which only 20,000 acres (81 km^{2}) had been reclaimed. In 1597, 50 acres (20 ha) of land were recovered near the Parrett estuary; a few years later, 140 acres (57 ha) near Pawlett were recovered by means of embankments; and three further reclamations, totalling 110 acres (45 ha), had been undertaken downstream of Bridgwater by 1660.

In the early 17th century, during the time of King James I, abortive plans were made to drain and enclose much of Sedgemoor, which the local Lords supported but opposed by the Commoners who would have lost grazing rights. In 1632, Charles I sold the Crown's interest in the scheme, and it was taken over by a consortium that included Sir Cornelius Vermuyden, a Dutch drainage engineer. However, the work was delayed by the English Civil War and later defeated in parliament after local opposition. In 1638, it was reported that nearly 2,600 acres (11 km^{2}) of Tealham and Tadham Moors were not reclaimed, with a total of 30,500 acres (123.43 km^{2}) being undrained. Between 1785 and 1791, much of the lowest part of the peat moors was enclosed. In 1795, John Billingsley advocated enclosure and the digging of rhynes (a local name for drainage channels, pronounced "reens" in the east and rhyne to the west) between plots, and wrote in his Agriculture of the County of Somerset that 4,400 acres (18 km^{2}) had been enclosed in the last 20 years in Wedmore and Meare, 350 acres (1.4 km^{2}) at Nyland, 900 acres (3.64 km^{2}) at Blackford, 2,000 acres (8 km^{2}) at Mark, 100 acres (0.4 km^{2}) in Shapwick, and 1,700 acres (7 km^{2}) at Westhay.

At Westhay Moor in the early 19th century, it was shown how peat bogs could be successfully drained and top-dressed with silt deposited via flooding, creating a very rich soil. The character of the soil was also changed by the spreading of clay and silt from the digging of King's Sedgemoor Drain.

=== Pumps ===
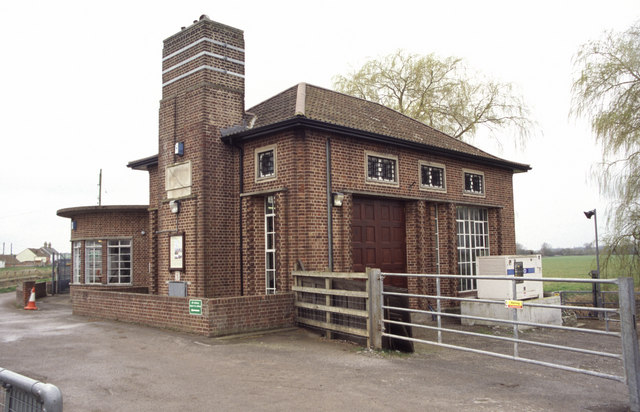
Curry Moor pumping station

Little attempt was made during the 17th and 18th centuries to pump water, possibly because the coal-driven Newcomen steam engines would have been uneconomical. It is unclear why windmills were not employed, as they were on the Fens of East Anglia, but only two examples have been recorded on the Levels: one at Bleadon at the mouth of the River Axe, where a sea wall had been built, and the other at Common Moor north of Glastonbury, which was being drained following a private act of Parliament in 1721, the Glastonbury Inclosure Act 1721 (8 Geo. 1. c. 16 Pr.). The first steam pumping station was Westonzoyland Pumping Station in 1830, followed by more effective ones from 1860. Automatic electric pumps are used today.

The human-made Huntspill River was constructed during World War II with sluices at both ends to provide a guaranteed daily supply of 4,500,000 imperial gallons (20,000,000 L; 5,400,000 US gal) of "process water". It was intended that in the summer, when water supply was lower, it would serve as a reservoir with water pumped from the moors; and in winter serve as a drainage channel, via gravity drainage. Geotechnical problems prevented it from being dug as deep as originally intended and so gravity-drainage of the moors was not possible: thus, water is pumped up into the river throughout the year.

The Sowy River between the River Parrett and King's Sedgemoor Drain was completed in 1972. The Levels and Moors are now artificially drained by a network of rhynes which are pumped up into "drains". Water levels are managed by the Levels internal drainage boards (IDBs); the Levels are not as intensively drained or farmed as the East Anglian fens, historically a similar area of low marsh. They are still liable to widespread fresh water flooding in winter. One of the approaches to reducing the risk of flooding within the catchment area of the Parrett is the planting of new woodlands.

Controversy about the management of the drainage and flood protection has previously involved the activities of IDBs. However, IDBs have been actively participating with the Parrett Catchment Partnership, a partnership of 30 organisations that aims to create a consensus on how water is to be managed, in particular, looking at new ways to achieve sustainable benefits for all local stakeholders.

During 2009 and 2010, work was undertaken to upgrade sluice gates, watercourses, and culverts to enable seasonal flooding of Southlake Moor during the winter diverting water from the Sowy River onto the moor. It has the capacity to hold 1.2 million cubic metres as part of a scheme by the Parrett Internal Drainage Board to restore ten floodplains in Somerset. In spring, the water is drained away to enable the land to be used as pasture during the summer. The scheme is also used to encourage water birds.

=== Sea defences ===
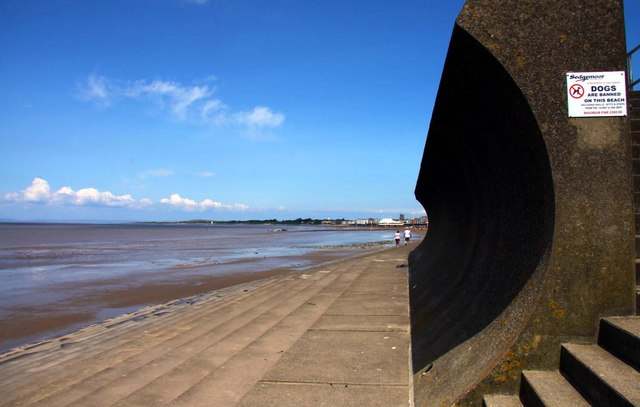
The sea wall and defences at Burnham-on-Sea

The Levels were frequently flooded by the sea during high tides, a problem that was not resolved until the sea defences were enhanced in the early 20th century. In addition, the problems of high fresh water floods are aggravated by the unrestricted entry of the tide along the Parrett, which is the only river in the Levels and Moors that does not have a clyse on it. Discussions on whether a clyse is needed for the Parrett and whether it should be sited at Bridgwater or nearer the mouth of the river date back to 1939, at the start of World War II, and have not been resolved.

On 13 December 1981, a large Atlantic storm hit the North Somerset coast. Meteorological conditions caused a large storm surge which coincided with high astronomical tides in the Bristol Channel and Severn Estuary. Wind speeds were measured at 40 knots (74 km/h; 46 mph). Overtopping of the sea defences along a 7 miles (11 km) stretch of the Somerset coast at 22 locations from Clevedon to Porlock began after 19:30. Although there was no loss of life, the resultant flooding covered 12,500 acres (5,100 ha) of land, affecting 1,072 houses and commercial properties, with £150,000 worth of livestock killed and £50,000 of feed and grain destroyed. Wessex Water Authority estimated the total cost of the damage caused at £6M. This resulted in a three-year programme of sea defence assessment, repair and improvement. With 400 properties affected in Burnham-on-Sea, after emergency repairs, Wessex Water Authority began planning new sea defences. Construction work started in 1983 on a £7M scheme, creating what was then Britain's biggest wave return wall.

The Environment Agency's current "Parrett Catchment Flood Management Plan", published in December 2009, divides the Parrett catchment area into eight sub-areas, with the Somerset Levels and Moors falling into sub-area 6 and Bridgwater falling into sub-area 7. As part of the published flood risk assessments for both these sub-areas, it is recognised that: at a future date a tidal clyse may be needed on the Parrett; this causes a funding dilemma; and, geomorphology studies of the Parrett and the Tone are needed to help address many of the uncertainties associated with a tidal exclusion project.

=== Flooding ===
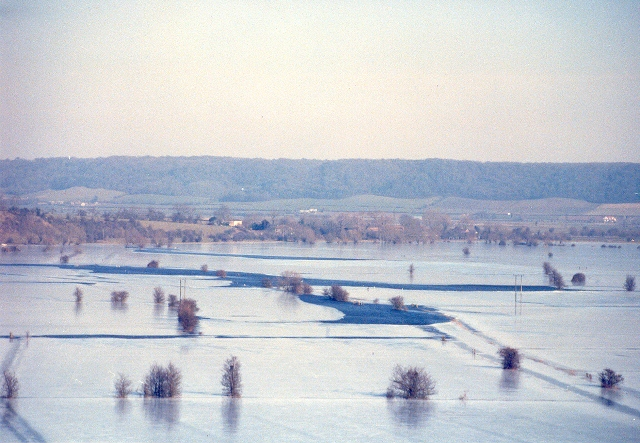
Southlake Moor during a winter flood (1985)

The Levels are at risk from both tidal and land-based flood waters.

During the great storm of 1703, waves came four feet (1.2 m) over the sea walls. The sea wall was again breached in 1799, filling the Axe valley with sea water. In 1872, another flood covered 7,000 acres (28 km^{2}) and in 1919, 70,000 acres (283 km^{2}) were inundated with sea water, poisoning the land for up to 7 years.

Since 1990, the drainage boards have been charged with watching the rhynes and keeping them clear, under the overall responsibility of the Environment Agency. With rising sea levels, the work required to maintain the sea defences is likely to become more expensive, and it has been proposed that two inland seas be created. Other studies have recommended maintaining the current defences for five years while undertaking further studies of available options.

Although the Environment Agency have made plans for the regular winter flooding, still in recent years this has resulted in a number of villages — including Muchelney and Westonzoyland — being cut off. In November 2012, during the 2012 Great Britain and Ireland floods, after six days Somerset County Council-funded BARB rescue boats reached Muchelney on 29 November, rescuing nearly 100 people.

Rescue boats were again required during the rain and storms from Cyclone Dirk in the turn of the year 2014, and subsequently during the Winter flooding of 2013–14 on the Somerset Levels. On 24 January 2014, in light of the continued flooded extent of the Somerset Moors and forecast new rainfall as part of the Winter storms of 2013–14 in the United Kingdom, both Somerset County Council and Sedgemoor District Council declared a major incident. At this time, with 17,000 acres (6,900 ha) of agricultural land having been under water for over a month, the village of Thorney had been abandoned and Muchelney had been cut off by flood waters for almost a month. Environment Minister Owen Paterson visited the area on 27 January 2014, and after meeting local MPs, the Environment Agency and various community representatives the night before in Taunton, promised at a media-only press conference at North Moor pumping station that if a local water management plan could be developed over the next six weeks, he would approve it. Such plan would likely include the dredging of the rivers Tone and Parrett, and possibly a later sluice near Bridgwater. There have been public protests about the river Parrett not being dredged in recent years. In mid-February 2014 the Environment Agency began installing giant pumps imported from the Netherlands to alleviate the continuing flooding.

== Human habitation ==
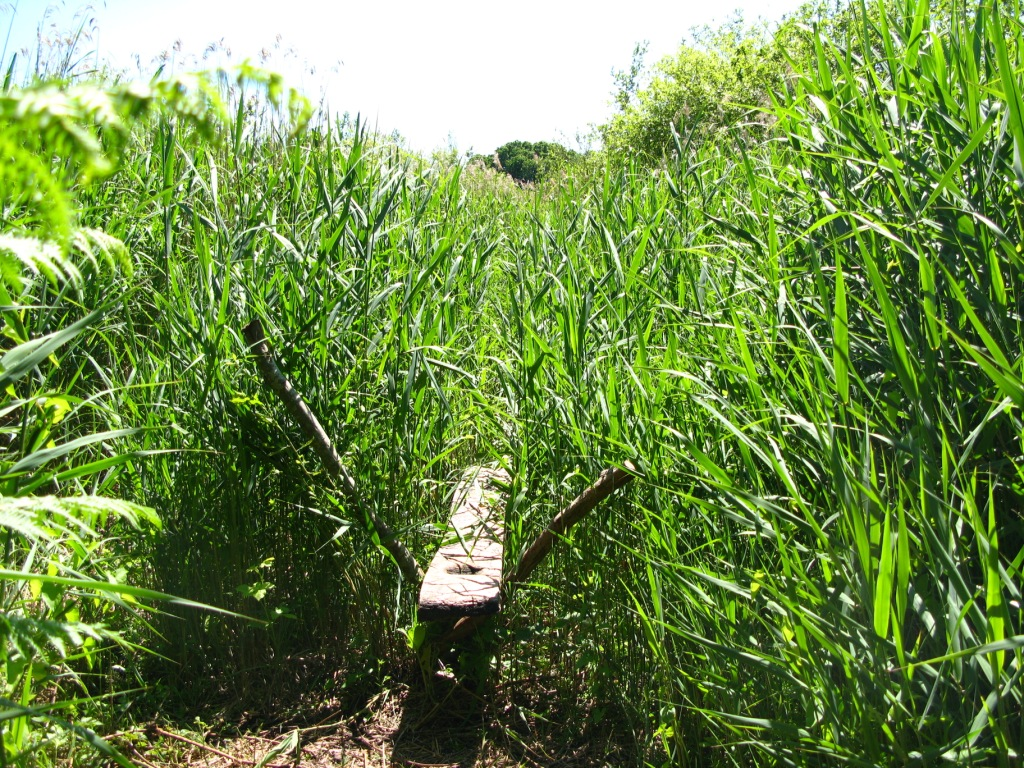
A replica of the Sweet Track

A Palaeolithic flint tool found in Westbury is the earliest indication of human presence in the area, dating from approximately 500,000 years ago. Later during the 7th millennium BC the sea level rose and flooded the valleys, forcing the Mesolithic people to occupy seasonal camps on the higher ground, indicated by scatters of flints. Subsequent winter flooding probably led to prehistoric man's using the Levels only in the summer, hence the county of Somerset may derive its name from Sumorsaete, meaning land of the summer people. An alternative suggestion is that the name derives from Seo-mere-saetan meaning "settlers by the sea lakes". The Neolithic people continued to exploit the reedswamps for their natural resources and started to construct wooden trackways such as the Sweet and Post Tracks. The Sweet Track, named after the peat digger who discovered it in 1970 and dating from the 3800s BC, is the world's oldest timber trackway, once thought to be the world's oldest engineered roadway. The track was built between what was in the early 4th millennium BC an island at Westhay and a ridge of high ground at Shapwick, close to the River Brue. The remains of similar tracks have been uncovered nearby, connecting settlements on the peat bog including the Honeygore, Abbotts Way, Bells, Bakers, Westhay and Nidons trackways.

The Levels contain the best-preserved prehistoric village in the UK, Glastonbury Lake Village, as well as two others at Meare Lake Village. Discovered in 1892 by Arthur Bulleid, it was inhabited by about 200 people living in 14 roundhouses, and was built on a morass on an artificial foundation of timber filled with brushwood, bracken, rubble and clay. Investigation of the Meare Pool indicates that it was formed by the encroachment of raised peat bogs, particularly during the Subatlantic climatic period (1st millennium BC), and core sampling demonstrates that it is filled with at least 2 metres (6.6 ft) of detritus mud.

The two villages within Meare Pool appear to originate from a collection of structures erected on the surface of the dried peat, such as tents, windbreaks and animal folds. Clay was later spread over the peat, providing raised stands for occupation, industry and movement, and in some areas thicker clay spreads accommodated hearths built of clay or stone.

The area continued to be inhabited during the Bronze Age, when the population supported itself largely by hunting and fishing in the surrounding marshes, living on artificial islands connected by wooden causeways on wooden piles. There have been many finds of metalwork during peat cutting, which may have been devotional offerings. Brent Knoll has been settled by people since at least the Bronze Age. It is the site of an Iron Age hillfort known as Brent Knoll Camp, with multiple ramparts (multivallate) following the contours of the hill. Several settlements and hill forts were built on the natural "islands" of slightly raised land, including Brent Knoll, Glastonbury, and the low range of the Polden Hills. According to legend Ider son of Nuth, who was one of King Arthur's knights, went to the Mount of Frogs on a quest to slay three giants who lived there. The fort has been claimed as the site of the Battle of Mons Badonicus.

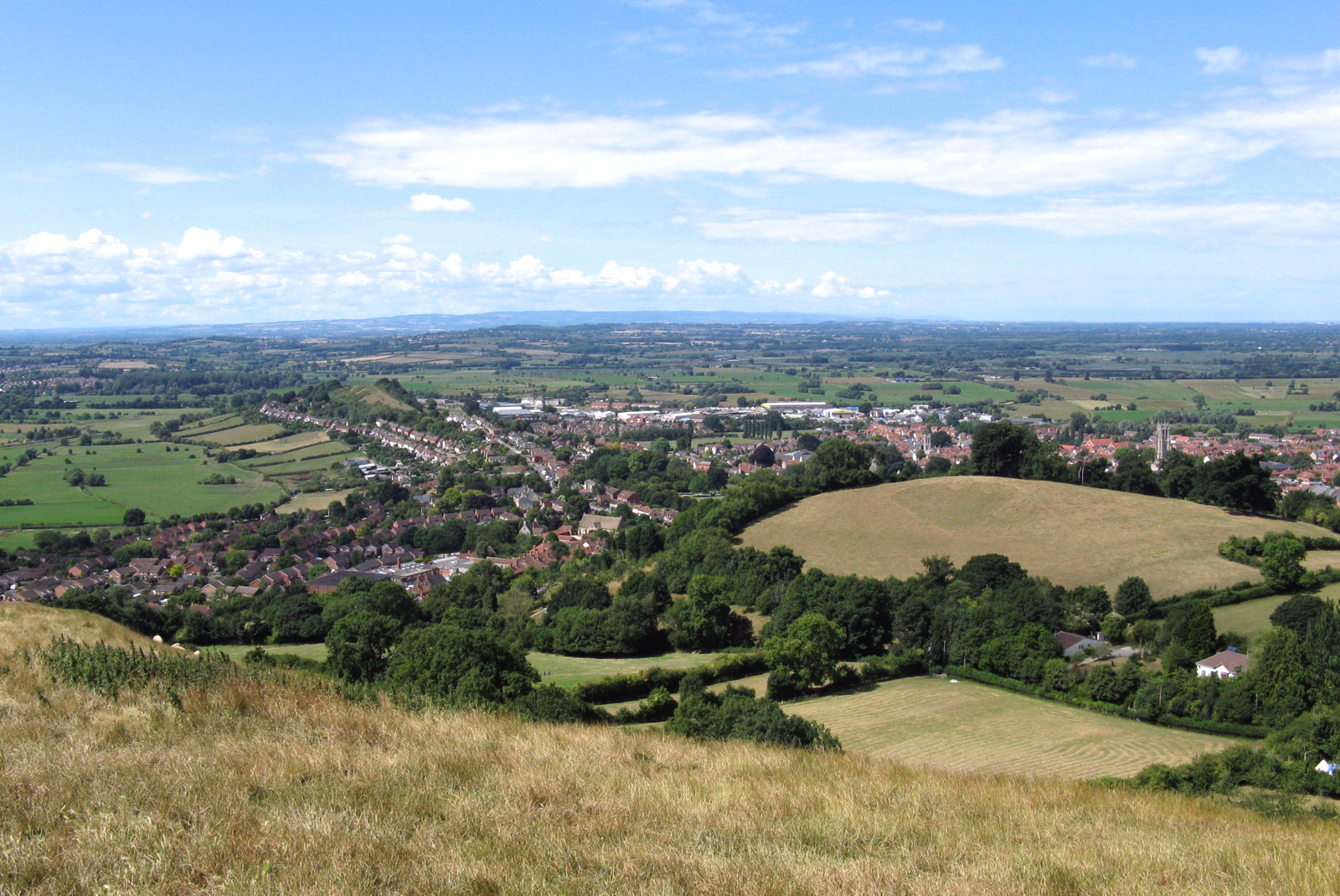
The town of Glastonbury, Somerset, looking west from the top of Glastonbury Tor. The fields in the distance are part of the Levels.

Sea salt was extracted during the Roman period, and a string of settlements were set up along the Polden Hills. Some possible settlement sites are also known in the Draycott and Cheddar Moors and around Highbridge. The discovery in 1998 at Shapwick of 9,238 silver Roman coins, the second largest hoard ever found from the Roman Empire included coins dated from as early as 31–30 BC up until 224 AD. The hoard also contained two rare coins which had not been discovered in Britain before, and the largest number of silver denarii ever found in Britain.

A number of Anglo-Saxon charters document the incorporation of areas of moor in estates, suggesting that the area continued to be exploited. It is easy to see why the area acquired a number of legends, particularly of King Arthur and his followers, who some believe based his court in the hill fort at South Cadbury. According to legend, Alfred the Great burnt cakes when hiding in the marshes of Athelney, after the Danish invasion in 875. After the Battle of Edington the Danish king, Guthrum, was baptised at Aller and a peace treaty signed at Wedmore.

In 1685, the Monmouth Rebellion ended at the Battle of Sedgemoor, which was fought in the Bussex area of Westonzoyland.

== Land use ==
The Levels have few wooded areas, just occasional willow trees. The landscape is dominated by grassland, mostly used as pasture for dairy farming with approximately 70 per cent of the area being grassland and 30 per cent arable. From January until May, the River Parrett provides a source of European eels (Anguilla anguilla) and young elvers, which are caught by hand netting as this is the only legal means of catching them. A series of eel passes have been built on the Parrett at the King's Sedgemoor Drain to help this endangered species; cameras have shown 10,000 eels migrating upstream in a single night. The 2003 BBC Radio 4 play Glass Eels by Nell Leyshon was set on the Parrett.

The Levels, as part of the West Country, traditionally produced cider, with individual farms having orchards and their own cider, known as scrumpy. However, over 60% of Somerset's orchards have been lost in the last fifty years; and apple production occupies less than 0.4% of the land. Cider is still produced in Somerset by Thatchers Cider, Gaymer Cider Company and numerous small independent producers. Other local industries that once thrived on the Levels, such as thatching (using reeds) and basket making (using willow), have been in decline since the second half of the 20th century. Combined with the recent drop in farm incomes, this poses a potential threat to the "traditional" nature of the area as a whole. Subsidies are paid to farmers who manage their land in the traditional way.

=== Electricity generation ===
In 2009, National Grid began public consultations over plans to build a line of electricity pylons, by one of two routes between Hinkley Point and Avonmouth. The plans attracted local opposition. The first consultation process ended in January 2010. They had proposed that each pylon would be 151 feet (46 m) high: the consultation was only in respect of preferences between two alternate routes, not the size nor the use of large pylons. The proposed line, which is due to open by September 2017, will transmit electricity at 400 kilovolts from the proposed Hinkley Point C nuclear power station. Hinkley Point C is a project to construct a 3,200 MWe nuclear power station with two EPR reactors. The site is one of eight announced by the British government in 2010, and in November 2012 a nuclear site licence was granted. On 28 July 2016 the EDF board approved the project, and on 15 September 2016 the UK government approved the project with some safeguards for the investment. In March 2017, EDF, after the Office for Nuclear Regulation gave approval to start building a network of tunnels to carry cabling and piping, started work also under way on a jetty, seawall and accommodation blocks. The concrete pour for the first reactor is planned only at earliest in 2019.

In 2010 and 2011, two proposals to build a total of 14 wind turbines, with Ecotricity to build five or four adjacent to the M5 Motorway near Brent Knoll and Électricité de France to build nine at East Huntspill, are opposed by local groups on the grounds of their effect on the local environment and potential damage to the bird population.

=== Willow ===
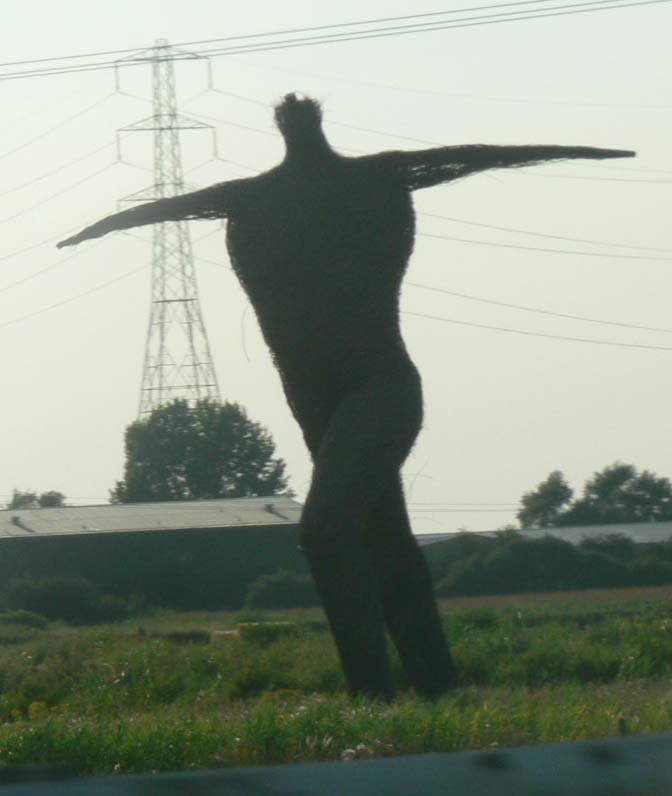
Willow Man

Willow has been cut and used on the Levels since mankind moved into the area. Fragments of willow basket were found near the Glastonbury Lake Village, and it was used in the construction of several Iron Age causeways. The willow was harvested using traditional methods of pollarding, where a tree would be cut back to the main stem. New shoots of willow, called "withies", would grow out of the trunk and these would be cut periodically for use.

During the 1930s, over 9,000 acres (36 km^{2}) of willow were being grown commercially on the Levels. Largely because of the replacement of baskets by plastic bags and cardboard boxes, the industry has severely declined since the 1950s. By the end of the 20th century only about 350 acres (1.4 km^{2}) were grown commercially, near the villages of Burrowbridge, Westonzoyland, and North Curry. The Somerset Levels is now the only area in the UK where basket willow is grown commercially. For weaving, the species Salix triandra (almond willow, black maul) is grown, while Salix viminalis (common osier) is ideal for handles, bases, and the structural members in furniture and hurdles. Historically willow was used to make salmon traps or "putchers". Products including baskets, eel traps (kypes), lobster pots, and furniture were widely made from willow throughout the area in the recent past. Among the more unusual products still made are passenger baskets for hot air balloons, the frames inside the Bearskins worn by the regiments of the Brigade of Guards, and an increasing number of willow coffins.

Another use of willow has been found by the Coate family, who make artists' charcoals in Stoke St Gregory. It has become in 30 years the leading artists' charcoal manufacturer in Europe, producing most of the natural charcoals sold under different art-material brands.

The industry is celebrated in the form of the Willow Man (sometimes known as the Angel of the South), a willow sculpture, 40 feet (12.2 m) tall, produced by artist Serena de la Hey in September 2000 that can be seen from the railway and the M5 motorway to the north of Bridgwater. At Stoke St Gregory there is also a Willows and Wetlands Visitor Centre.

=== Teazel growing ===
An unusual crop was the growing of teazels around the River Isle near Chard on the heavy clay soils around Fivehead, although this industry died out by the 1980s-90s. These are still sometimes used to provide a fine finish on worsteds and snooker table cloths, but were previously much more widely used in the processing of wool for the textiles industry.

=== Peat extraction ===
The extraction of peat from the Moors is known to have taken place during Roman times, and has been carried out since the Levels were first drained. The introduction of plastic packaging in the 1950s allowed the peat to be packed without rotting, which led to the industrialisation of peat extraction during the 1960s as a major market in horticultural peat was developed. The resulting reduction in water levels put local ecosystems at risk; peat wastage in pasture fields was occurring at rates of 1–3 feet (0.3–0.8 m) over 100 years. Peat extraction continues today, although much reduced.

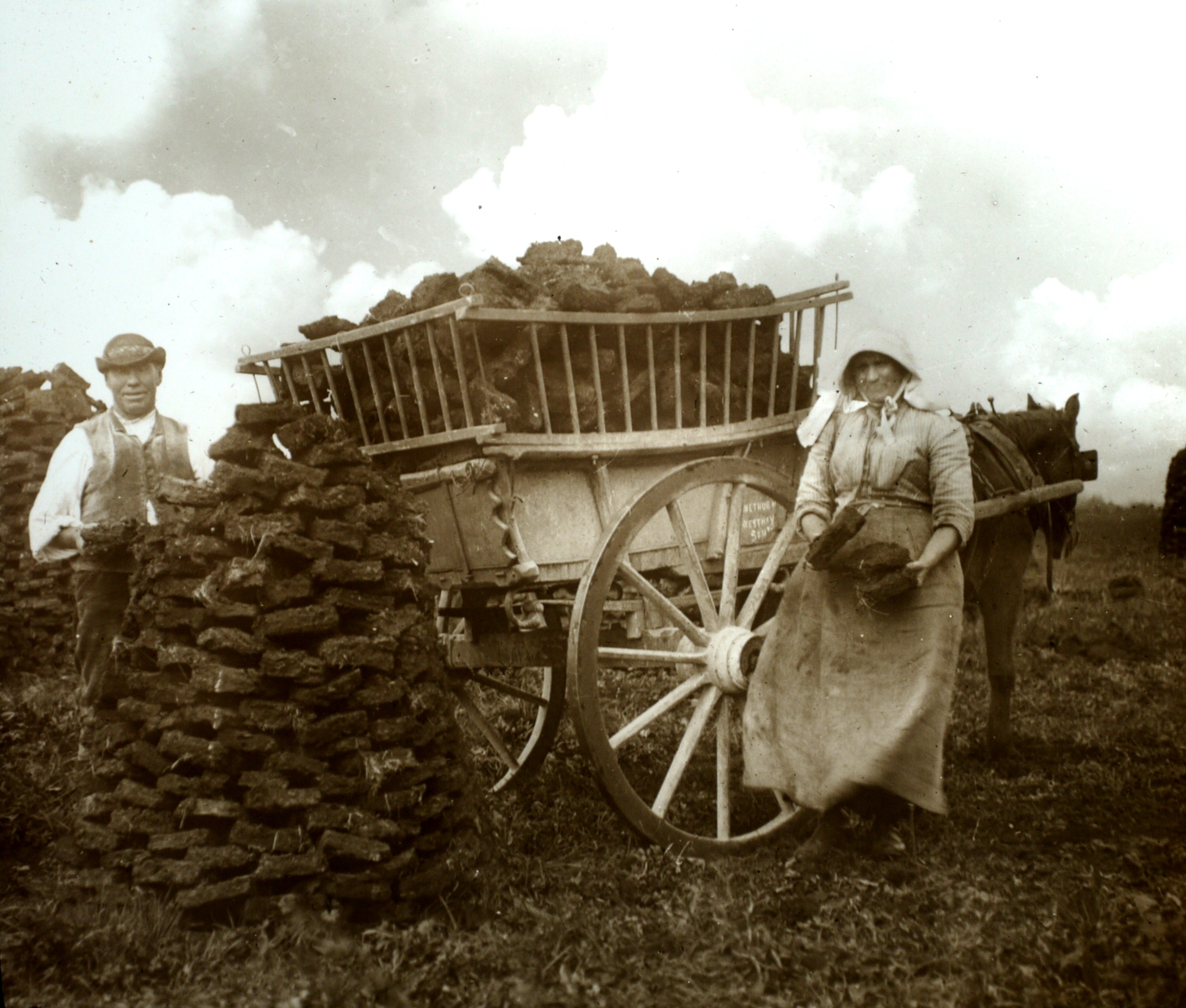
Peat gatherers, Westhay, September 1905

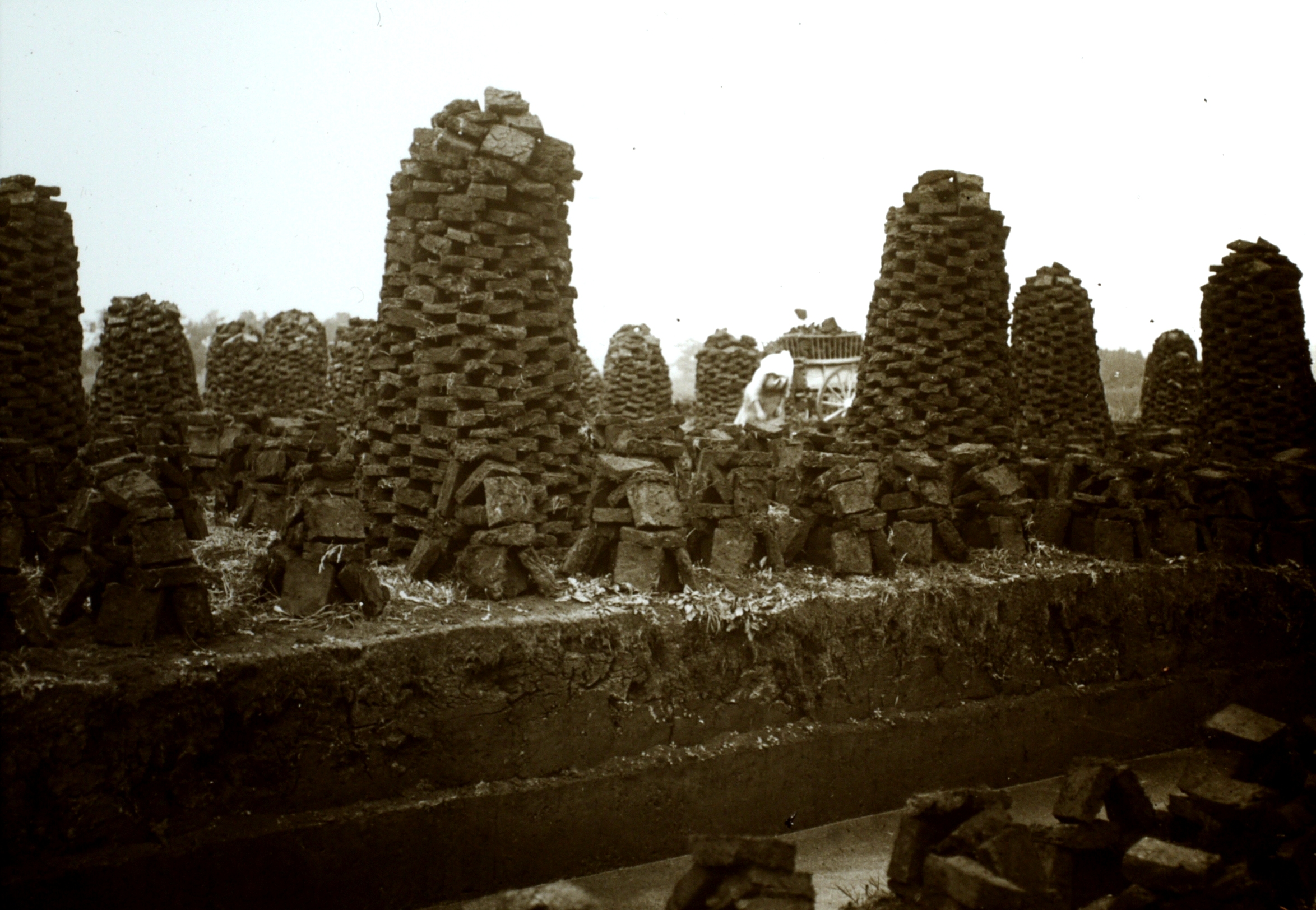
Peat stacks and cutting, Westhay, September 1905

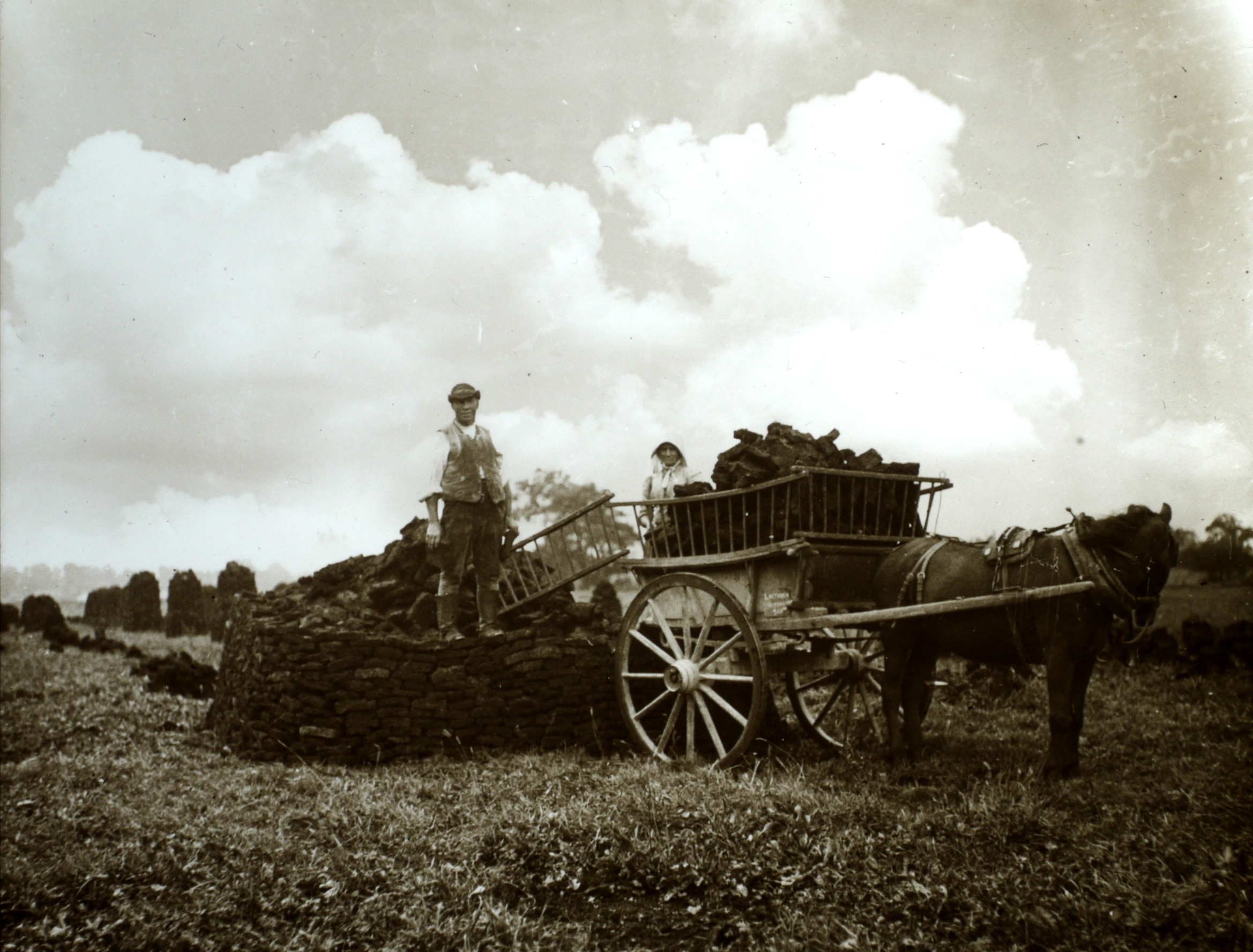
Harvesting the peat, Westhay, September 1905

== Biodiversity and conservation ==
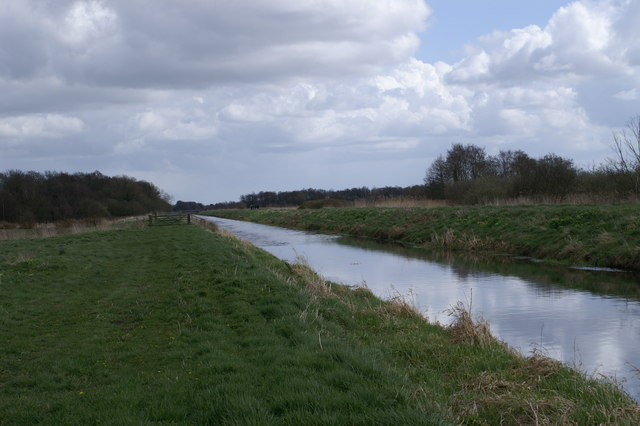
South Drain on Shapwick Heath

As a result of their wetland nature, the Moors and Levels contain a rich biodiversity of national and international importance. They support a vast variety of plant species, including common plants such as marsh marigold, meadowsweet, and ragged robin. The area is an important feeding ground for birds including Bewick's swan, Eurasian curlew, common redshank, Eurasian skylark, common snipe, Eurasian teal, wigeon, and Eurasian whimbrel, as well as birds of prey including the marsh harrier and peregrine falcon. A wide range of insect species is also present, including rare invertebrates, particularly beetles including the lesser silver water beetle, Bagous nodulosus, Hydrophilus piceus, Odontomyia angulata, Oulema erichsoni, and Valvata macrostoma. In addition, the area supports an important otter population. Water voles (Arvicola amphibius) are being encouraged to recolonise areas of the Levels where they have been absent for 10 years, by the capture of mink (Mustela vison).

In 2010, a project was started to reintroduce the common crane to the Levels, after an absence of 400 years. The birds' eggs were flown from Germany to the Slimbridge wetland reserve managed by the Wildfowl and Wetlands Trust (a UK charity) at Slimbridge, Gloucestershire, and reared to the age of five months before being released onto the Levels. The "Great Crane Project" aims to introduce around 20 of the birds each year until 2015. The work, which included collaboration with Pensthorpe Nature Reserve and the Royal Society for the Protection of Birds, was supported by a grant of £700k from Viridor Credits.

The Levels contain 32 Sites of Special Scientific Interest (12 of them also Special Protection Areas), the River Huntspill and Bridgwater Bay national nature reserves, the Somerset Levels and Moors Ramsar Site covering about 86,000 acres (348 km^{2}), the Somerset Levels National Nature Reserve, Shapwick Heath National Nature Reserve, Ham Wall National Nature Reserve and numerous Scheduled monuments. The Brue Valley Living Landscape conservation project commenced in 2009 and aims to restore, recreate and reconnect habitat. It aims to ensure that wildlife is enhanced and capable of sustaining itself in the face of climate change while guaranteeing farmers and other landowners can continue to use their land profitably. It is one of an increasing number of landscape scale conservation projects in the UK. About 72,000 acres (291 km^{2}) of the Levels are recognised as an Environmentally Sensitive Area, and other areas are designated as Areas of High Archaeological Potential, but there is currently no single conservation designation covering the Levels and Moors.

A survey in 2005 discovered that 11 of the known wooden Bronze Age causeways on the Levels had been destroyed or vanished and others were seriously damaged, caused by the reduction in water levels and subsequent exposure of the timber to oxygen and aerobic bacteria. Part of the Sweet Track is being actively conserved. Following purchase of land by the National Heritage Memorial Fund, and installation of a water pumping and distribution system along a 550-yard (500 m) section, several hundred metres of the track's length are now being actively conserved. This method of preserving wetland archaeological remains (i.e. maintaining a high water table and saturating the site) is rare. A 550-yard (500 m) section, which lies within the land owned by the Nature Conservancy Council, has been surrounded by a clay bank to prevent drainage into surrounding lower peat fields, and water levels are regularly monitored. The viability of this method is demonstrated by comparing it with the nearby Abbot's Way, which has not had similar treatment, and which in 1996 was found to have become dewatered and desiccated. Evaluation and maintenance of water levels in the Shapwick Heath Nature Reserve involves the Nature Conservancy Council, the Department for Environment, Food and Rural Affairs and the Somerset Levels Project.

== Somerset Levels Project ==
In 1964, archaeologist John Coles from the University of Cambridge began a research project that resulted in the publication of an important series of papers on many aspects of the Levels. A range of archaeological projects, such as the exploration of various trackways from the 3rd and 1st millennia BC and the establishment of their economic and geographic significance, was funded by various donors including English Heritage. Possibly the project's most significant excavation was of the Sweet Track in 1970, during which a Jadeite axe was discovered. Eight radiocarbon determinations of the date of the axe place it at around 3200 BC.

The work of John Coles and the Somerset Levels Project was recognised in 1998 when they won the ICI Award for the best archaeological project offering a major contribution to knowledge, and in 2006 with the award of the European Archaeological Heritage Prize.

== Shapwick Project ==
This project, based on the village of Shapwick, was begun by Mick Aston of Bristol University to investigate the evolution of a typical English village. A preliminary study of the village's history was carried out using maps and documents, then surveys of the buildings were made together with botanical surveys. Field walking was carried out and key sites excavated. A report on the project, which ran from 1989 to 1999, was published in eight volumes.

== Tourism ==
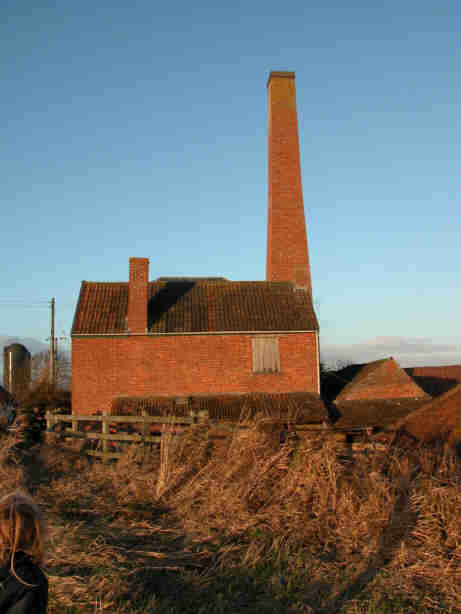
Westonzoyland Pumping Station Museum

Being largely flat, the Levels are well suited to bicycles, and a number of cycle routes exist including the Withy Way Cycle Route (22 mi or 35 km), Avalon Marshes Cycle Route (28 mi or 45 km), Peat Moors Cycle Route (24 mi or 39 km) and the Isle Valley Cycle Route (28 mi or 45 km). The River Parrett Trail (47 mi or 76 km) and Monarch's Way long-distance footpaths are also within the area.

Visitors' centres aim to convey various aspects of the Levels. The Willows and Wetlands Visitor Centre near Stoke St Gregory offers tours of the willow yards and basket workshops and explains the place of willow in the history of the Levels. The Somerset Willow Company also allows visitors into its workshops.

The Avalon Marshes Centre (formerly known as the Peat Moors Centre) between Westhay and Shapwick, is dedicated to the natural history, biodiversity, archaeology, history, and geology of the area. It also includes reconstructions of some archaeological discoveries of the area, such as a Roman Villa and a Saxon Longhall. The site offers much information on Iron Age finds, round houses, and ancient highways, the Post Track and Sweet Track. From time to time the centre offers events and courses in a number of ancient technologies in subjects including textiles, clothing and basket-making, as well as staging various open days, displays, demonstrations and guided nature excursions. The centre also contains the offices and workshops for the RSPB, Somerset Wildlife Trust, Natural England and The Hawk and Owl Trust for which all have reserves close by. In February 2009 Somerset County Council, the owner of the Peat Moors Centre, announced its intention of closing the centre and it finally shut on 31 October 2009, but it was reopened as the Avalon Marshes Centre and is in the process of being modernized and improved from the previous set of buildings.

The Tribunal in Glastonbury, a medieval merchant's house, contains possessions and works of art from the Glastonbury Lake Village, which were preserved in almost perfect condition in the peat after the village was abandoned. It also houses the tourist information centre. Also in Glastonbury, the Somerset Rural Life Museum is a museum of the social and agricultural history of Somerset, housed in buildings surrounding a 14th-century barn once belonging to Glastonbury Abbey. It was used as a tithe barn for the storage of arable produce, particularly wheat and rye, from the abbey's home farm of approximately 524 acres (2.12 km^{2}). Threshing and winnowing would also have been carried out in the barn. The barn was built from local shelly limestone, with thick timbers supporting the stone tiling of the roof. It has been designated by English Heritage as a grade I listed building, and is a Scheduled monument. The barn and courtyard contain displays of farm machinery from the Victorian and early 20th century periods. Other exhibits show local crafts, including willow coppicing, mud horse fishing on the flats of Bridgwater Bay, peat digging on the Somerset Levels and the production of milk, cheese, and cider. In reconstructed rooms detailing domestic life in the nearby village of Butleigh, the story of one farm worker, John Hodges, is told from cradle to grave. Outside, there is a beehive and rare breeds of poultry and sheep in the cider apple orchard.

The Langport & River Parrett Visitor Centre at Langport details local life, history, and wildlife. The Westonzoyland Pumping Station Museum, near the town on the River Parrett, is housed in one of the earliest steam-powered pumping stations on the Levels, dating from the 1830s; it was closed in the 1950s. Featuring several steam engines, some built locally, the museum holds a number of live steam days each year. The pump house has been Grade II* listed, and is on English Heritage's Heritage at Risk Register.

== See also ==
- List of locations in the Somerset Levels
- Caldicot and Wentloog Levels
- The Fens
- Romney Marsh
- Geology of Somerset
- East Somerset Railway
