= Westonzoyland =

Village and civil parish in Somerset, England

Coordinates: 51.106°N 2.923°W

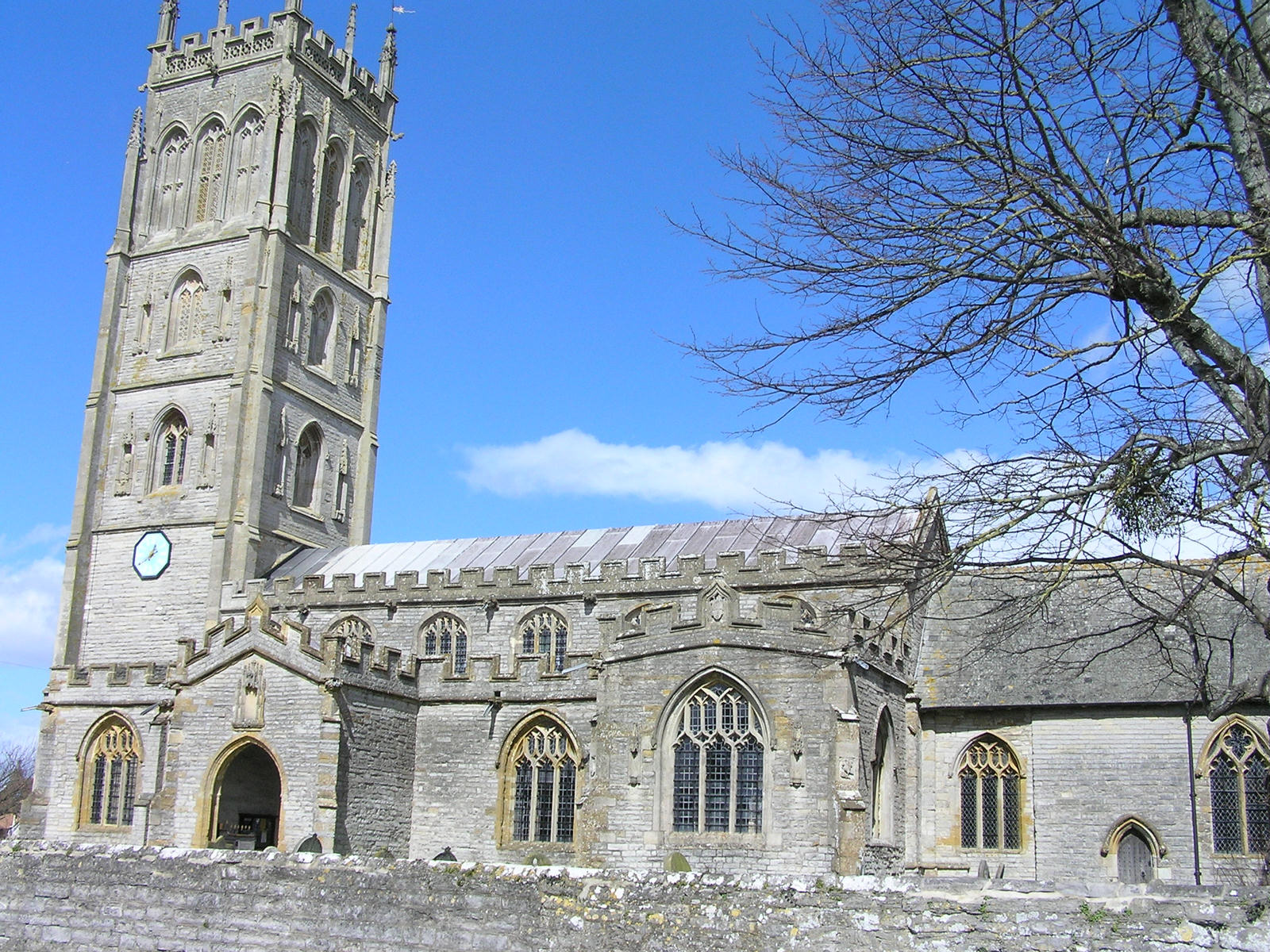
- St Mary's Church

- Location within Somerset
- Population: 1,801 (2011)
- OS grid reference: ST352348
- Unitary authority: Somerset Council
- Ceremonial county: Somerset
- Region: South West
- Country: England
- Sovereign state: United Kingdom
- Post town: BRIDGWATER
- Postcode district: TA7
- Dialling code: 01278
- Police: Avon and Somerset
- Fire: Devon and Somerset
- Ambulance: South Western
- UK Parliament: Bridgwater

Westonzoyland is a village and civil parish in Somerset, England. It is situated on the Somerset Levels, 4 miles (6.4 km) south east of Bridgwater.

== History ==
The name of the parish derives from its location on the "island" of Sowy, an area of slightly higher ground on the Somerset Levels between the River Cary and the River Parrett. The parish of Westernzoyland was created in 1515 when the parish of Sowy was divided. Westonzoyland refers to the westernmost settlement on Sowy. The parish of Westonzoyland was part of the Whitley Hundred.

The area around Westonzoyland was farmed as common land when it was owned by the Abbey at Glastonbury, who during the 12th and 13th centuries encouraged tenants to undertake large scale reclamation of the marshland. 722 acres (292 ha) were enclosed in 1234. With the dissolution of the Abbey in 1539, the land was divided among owners, with the soil belonging to the Crown. Cornelius Vermuyden was active in the region in the mid 17th century, building small-scale drainage schemes at Cossington, Catcott, Huntspill and Puriton, but despite the devastation caused by extensive flooding in 1607, was unable to convince the communities of Sedgemoor of the benefits that a drainage scheme would bring, as they feared that improved pastures would prejudice their common rights. A series of acts of Parliament were passed between 1777 and 1801, which authorised the construction of drainage schemes in the Somerset moors and levels.

The penultimate battle in England, the Battle of Sedgemoor, was fought here on 6 July 1685, near the Bussex area to the north of the village. It was the final battle of the Monmouth Rebellion and followed a series of skirmishes around south west England between the forces of James Scott, 1st Duke of Monmouth and the crown he was trying to take. The royalist forces prevailed and about 500 rebel troops were captured. A mural depicting the battle can be found on display at Sedgemoor motorway services on the North carriageway of the M5.

=== Pumping Station Museum ===
Westonzoyland is home to Somerset's earliest steam-powered pumping station, built in 1830. Once a guardian of the Somerset Levels, it is now a small museum displaying stationary steam engines and exhibits of land drainage history. Pride of place goes to the station's pumping engine, the Easton and Amos. It is still in the main engine house, built in 1861 to replace an earlier engine that had been carrying out pumping work since 1831. In 1976, restoration of the site began, and in 1990 the site was bought from the owners, Wessex Water. The pump house has been Grade II* listed, and is on the English Heritage Heritage at Risk Register.

=== Aviation ===
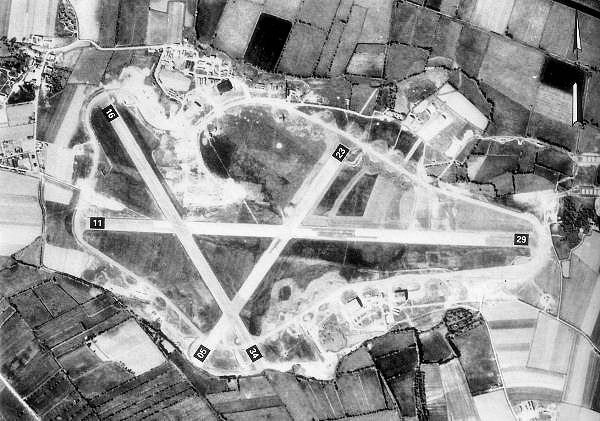
Weston Zoyland airfield, 22 April 1944. Devoid of aircraft prior to the 442d Troop Carrier Group moving in during June.

To the east of the village is the former RAF Weston Zoyland (1926–68) Airfield, which was used for a variety of duties, including air combat and the transport of airborne ground troops to France during World War II.

Today it now houses an airstrip on the north side for the Westonzoyland Microlight Aircraft Club — the 'Zoyboyz'. Microlight aircraft fly from the base for both recreation and as part of Sky Watch, a Civil Air Patrol, whose mission is "Keeping an eye out from the air for anyone in distress either on land or sea".

Middlezoy Aerodrome started operating in 2018 on the south side of RAF Weston Zoyland. A hangar and an original Nissen hut have been erected. Restoration of various types including the Piston Provost is ongoing by The Somerset Aeroplane Company. A Meteor T.7 gate guard can be seen from the A372 main road. Middlezoy Aerodrome hold a show every summer called The Somerset Aerofest.

Sedgemoor Radio Control Flying Club fly on the east side of the airfield.

The airfield is also home to local football club Middlezoy Rovers F.C.

=== Carnival ===
Hidden in the centre of the village are the workshops of Westonzoyland Carnival Club, referred to by its members as "The Shed". Formed in 1960 this is one of the oldest village clubs on the Somerset Carnival circuit.

== Governance ==
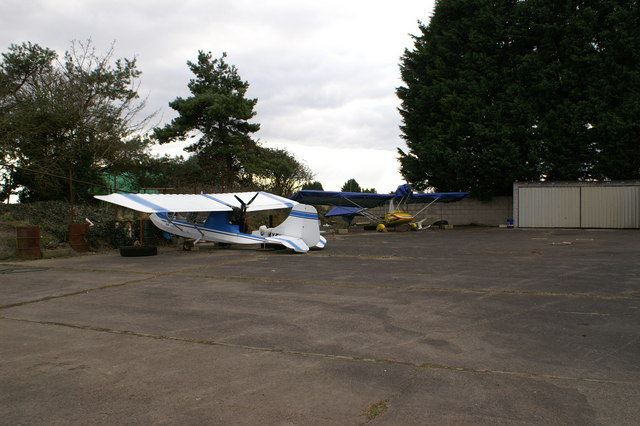
Micro Light Aircraft at Westonzoyland Airfield

The parish council has responsibility for local issues, including setting an annual precept (local rate) to cover the council's operating costs and producing annual accounts for public scrutiny. The parish council evaluates local planning applications and works with the local police, district council officers, and neighbourhood watch groups on matters of crime, security, and traffic. The parish council's role also includes initiating projects for the maintenance and repair of parish facilities, as well as consulting with the district council on the maintenance, repair, and improvement of highways, drainage, footpaths, public transport, and street cleaning. Conservation matters (including trees and listed buildings) and environmental issues are also the responsibility of the council.

For local government purposes, since 1 April 2023, the village comes under the unitary authority of Somerset Council. Prior to this, it was part of the non-metropolitan district of Sedgemoor, which was formed on 1 April 1974 under the Local Government Act 1972, having previously been part of Bridgwater Rural District.

The village ls within the 'King's Isle' electoral ward. Although Westonzoyland is the most populous area the ward stretches to Othery in the south east and Bawdrip in the north. The total population of the ward as at the 2011 census was 4,506.

It is also part of the Bridgwater and West Somerset county constituency represented in the House of Commons of the Parliament of the United Kingdom. It elects one Member of Parliament (MP) by the first past the post system of election, and was part of the South West England constituency of the European Parliament prior to Britain leaving the European Union in January 2020, which elected seven MEPs using the d'Hondt method of party-list proportional representation.

== Geography ==
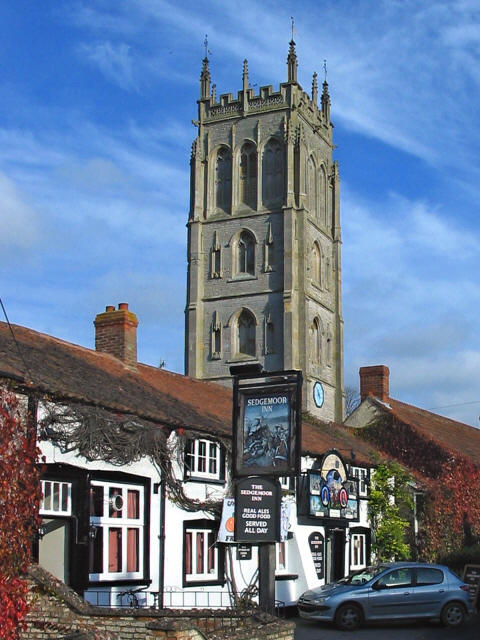
The Sedgemoor Inn

The parish includes the hamlet of Andersea, 2 km to the south-west. Westonzoyland has a population of approximately 1,600 and is the larger of the three 'Zoys', the others being the villages of Middlezoy and Chedzoy. There is one public house in the village, the Sedgemoor Inn. It has medieval origins and has been the village pub since the time of the battle in 1685. It is a grade II listed building.

The northern edge of the village is King's Sedgemoor Drain an artificial drainage channel completed in 1795, which diverts the River Cary and is used to help drain King's Sedgemoor. A major upgrade of the drain occurred during the Second World War, when an explosives factory, ROF Bridgwater, was built at Puriton. The drain was upgraded in 1972, as part of a £1.4 million scheme to construct a flood relief channel for the River Parrett. The 7.5-mile (12.1 km) embanked channel, called the Sowy River, runs from Monks Leaze Clyse below Langport to the King's Sedgemoor Drain near Westonzoyland Airfield.

To the south of the village is Langmead and Weston Level a 168.8 hectare (417.1 acre) biological Site of Special Scientific Interest. It forms part of the nationally important grazing marsh and ditch systems of the Somerset Levels and Moors. The site is nationally important for its species-rich neutral grassland and the invertebrate community found in the ditches and rhynes. The land lies in the flood plain of the River Parrett and many of the fields are poorly drained and seasonally water-logged. The terrestrial and aquatic invertebrates recorded on the site include four nationally rare species: the Great Silver Diving Beetle (Hydrophilus piceus), the soldier fly (Odontomyia ornata) and two true flies, Lonchoptera scutellata and Stenomicra cogani.

=== Climate ===
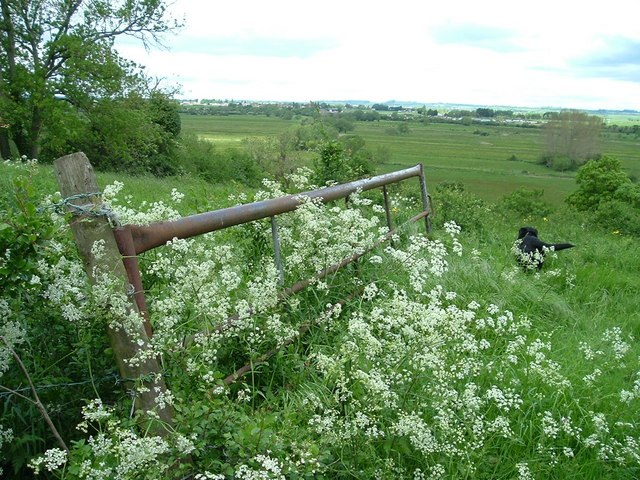
Westonzoyland from Windmill Hill

Along with the rest of South West England, Westonzoyland has a temperate climate which is generally wetter and milder than the rest of the country. The annual mean temperature is approximately 10 °C (50.0 °F). Seasonal temperature variation is less extreme than most of the United Kingdom because of the adjacent sea temperatures. The summer months of July and August are the warmest with mean daily maxima of approximately 21 °C (69.8 °F). In winter mean minimum temperatures of 1 °C (33.8 °F) or 2 °C (35.6 °F) are common. In the summer the Azores high pressure affects the south-west of England, however convective cloud sometimes forms inland, reducing the number of hours of sunshine. Annual sunshine rates are slightly less than the regional average of 1,600 hours. In December 1998 there were 20 days without sun recorded at Yeovilton. Most of the rainfall in the south-west is caused by Atlantic depressions or by convection. Most of the rainfall in autumn and winter is caused by the Atlantic depressions, which is when they are most active. In summer, a large proportion of the rainfall is caused by sun heating the ground leading to convection and to showers and thunderstorms. Average rainfall is around 700 mm (28 in). About 8–15 days of snowfall is typical. November to March have the highest mean wind speeds, and June to August have the lightest winds. The predominant wind direction is from the south-west.

== Battle of Sedgemoor ==
The final action of the Monmouth rebellion, the Battle of Sedgemoor took place on 6 July 1685 at Westonzoyland in Somerset.

The Monmouth Rebellion of the summer of 1685 was an attempt to seize the crown of England by James Scott, Duke of Monmouth, from his uncle the Catholic King James II. Leading a surprise night-time attack against the enemy encampment, Monmouth’s bold strategy was only discovered when a shot was fired from a passing Royalist patrol.

With the element of surprise now gone, the battle was all but lost; the farmers and peasants that made up the bulk of Monmouth’s 3,600 strong rebel forces were no match for the slightly smaller, but well equipped professional soldiers of the Royalist army.

In what would be the last pitched battle to be fought on English soil, the rebel army was totally destroyed. Monmouth himself was captured and later executed, and hundreds of his supporters suffered ferocious reprisals at the hands of the infamous Judge Jeffreys’ Bloody Assizes.

== Economy ==
Willow has been cut and used on the Levels since humans moved into the area. Fragments of willow basket were found near the Glastonbury Lake Village, and it was also used in the construction of several Iron Age causeways. The willow was harvested using a traditional method of coppicing, where a tree would be cut back to the main stem. New shoots of willow, called "withies", would grow out of the trunk and these would be cut periodically for use. During the 1930s over 9,000 acres (36 km^{2}) of willow were being grown commercially on the Levels. Largely due to the displacement of baskets with plastic bags and cardboard boxes, the industry has severely declined since the 1950s. By the end of the 20th century only around 350 acres (1.4 km^{2}) were grown commercially, near the villages of Burrowbridge, Westonzoyland and North Curry.

== Transport ==
The A372 road between Podimore and Bridgwater runs through Westonzoyland. Bridgwater railway station is the nearest station.

== Religious sites ==
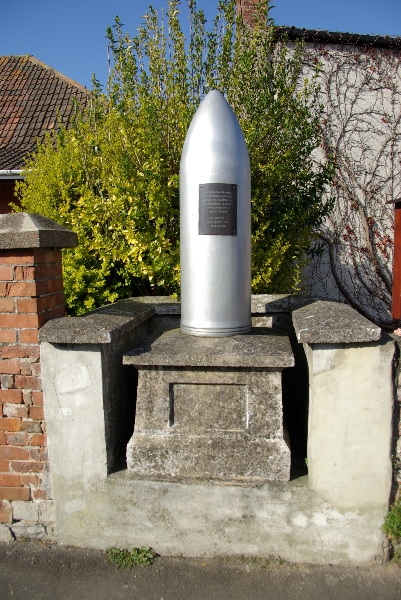
War Memorial

St Mary's Parish Church, with its 15th-century carved timber roof, has a link with two conflicts. It served as a prison for around 500 troops after the Battle of Sedgemoor and now contains a corner dedicated to local airmen who lost their lives in 1918 and 1919 and post World War II in the early 1950s.

The four-stage tower has an embattled parapet with quatrefoil arcading, and set-back buttresses which terminate in pinnacles on the bell-chamber stage.
