= Stoke St Gregory =

Village in Somerset, England

Coordinates: 51.0431°N 2.9356°W

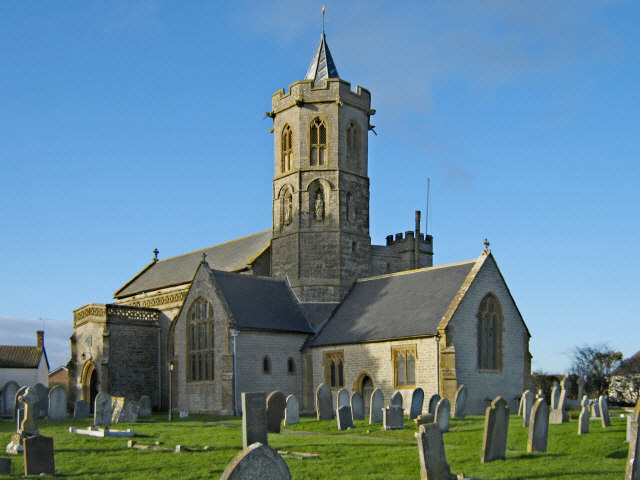
- St Gregory's parish church

- Location within Somerset
- Population: 1,012 (2021 census)
- OS grid reference: ST3427
- Civil parish: Stoke St Gregory
- Unitary authority: Somerset Council
- Ceremonial county: Somerset
- Region: South West
- Country: England
- Sovereign state: United Kingdom
- Post town: Taunton
- Postcode district: TA3
- Dialling code: 01823
- Police: Avon and Somerset
- Fire: Devon and Somerset
- Ambulance: South Western
- UK Parliament: Taunton and Wellington
- Website: Stoke St Gregory

Stoke St Gregory is a village and civil parish in Somerset, England, about 7 miles (11 km) east of Taunton. The village is on a low ridge of land between the River Tone to the north and West Sedgemoor to the south. The 2021 census recorded the parish's population as 1,012.

== History ==
The parish of Stoke St Gregory was part of the North Curry Hundred. The manor was held, with North Curry, from 1190 by the dean and chapter of Wells Cathedral.

The parish includes the Willows and Wetlands visitor centre which offers tours of more than 80 acres (0.12 sq mi) of withies, willow yards and basket workshops and explains the place of willow in the history of the Somerset Levels. Lovell's Farm has a withy boiler that was built in 1906.

Slough Farmhouse, formerly called Slough Court, was built in the late Middle Ages as a fortified manor house. It is a Grade II* listed building.

== Governance ==
The civil parish has a parish council.

For local government purposes, since 1 April 2023, the village comes under the unitary authority of Somerset Council. Prior to this, it was part of the non-metropolitan district of Somerset West and Taunton (formed on 1 April 2019) and, before this, the district of Taunton Deane (established under the Local Government Act 1972). From 1894 to 1974, for local government purposes, Stoke St Gregory was part of Taunton Rural District.

Stoke St Gregory is part of Taunton and Wellington county constituency, represented in the House of Commons of the Parliament of the United Kingdom. It elects one member of parliament (MP) by the first past the post system of election.

== Church and chapel ==
The Church of England parish of church of St Gregory was built in the 14th century. It has some 15th- and 18th-century features, was twice restored in the 19th century and is a Grade I listed building. There is a set of 17th- or 18th-century stocks in the churchyard. Nearby may be found the grave of Bunny Austin, renowned 1930s tennis champion. The churchyard is home to generations of the Hembrow family.

The Baptist Church was built in 1895 and has stables at the rear.

== Williams Hall (The Village Hall) ==
The original hall, a converted barn, had been donated by a Miss Williams in 1931. The objective of the Trust, as stated in the original Deed, is:

"The provision and maintenance of a village hall for the use of the inhabitants of Stoke St Gregory without distinction of political, religious or other opinions".

The "new" Stoke St Gregory village hall – the Williams Hall – was opened in 2006. The project to replace the old hall was largely funded through the efforts of those in the village who passionately believed in a facility to serve and support the local community.
