= West Moor SSSI =

Protected area in Somerset, England

West Moor
- Site of Special Scientific Interest
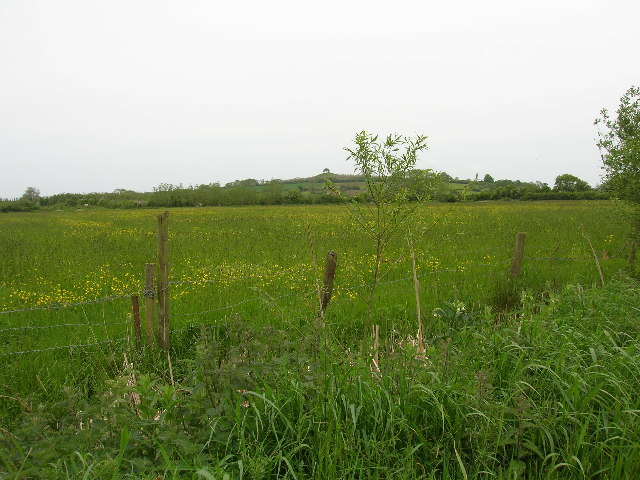

- Location within Somerset
- Location of West Moor.
- Area of search: Somerset
- Grid reference: ST420220
- Coordinates: 50.99446°N 2.82783°W
- Interest: Biological
- Area: 213 hectares (2.13 km^{2}; 0.82 sq mi)
- Notification date: 1985

West Moor (grid reference ST420220) is a 213.0 hectare (526.3 acre) biological Site of Special Scientific Interest on the River Parrett in Somerset, notified in 1985.

West Moor lies south of Curry Rivel, Langport, and Drayton, and northwest of Kingsbury Episcopi and is part of the extensive grazing marsh grasslands and ditch systems of the Somerset Levels and moors. The site contains some of the most diverse aquatic plant communities in the country. Rhynes often have a rich aquatic flora Frogbit (Hydrocharis morsus-ranae). A rich invertebrate fauna, with many nationally and locally rare species is associated with the botanical diversity of the ditches.
