= Southlake Moor =

Protected area in Somerset, England

- Site of Special Scientific Interest
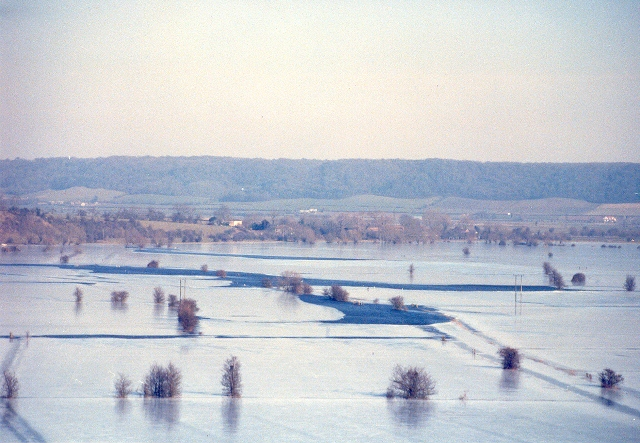

- Location within Somerset
- Location of Southlake Moor.
- Area of search: Somerset
- Grid reference: ST370300
- Coordinates: 51.06586°N 2.90046°W
- Interest: Biological
- Area: 196.1 hectares (1.961 km^{2}; 0.757 sq mi)
- Notification date: 1985

Southlake Moor (grid reference ST370300) is a biological Site of Special Scientific Interest (SSSI) near Burrow Mump and Burrowbridge in Somerset, England. It was designated as an SSSI in 1985.

Covering an area of 196.1 hectares (485 acres), Southlake Moor forms part of the extensive grazing marsh and ditch system of the Somerset Levels and Moors. Southlake is unusual in that, when conditions in the River Parrett are suitable, it may be deliberately flooded in winter by means of a sluice in the river floodbank. Some 96 species of aquatic and bankside vascular plant species have been recorded from Southlake Moor; of particular interest is the greater water-parsnip. When the moor is flooded, large numbers of wildfowl may be present; with up to 22,000 wigeon, 250 Bewick's swan and good numbers of pochard, teal and tufted duck. Regular signs of the otter are seen on the muddy banks of the River Parrett. The ditches on the east side of the site contain a population of the palmate newt.

During 2009 and 2010 work was undertaken to upgrade sluice gates, watercourses and culverts to enable seasonal flooding during the winter diverting water from the Sowy River onto the moor. It has the capacity to hold 1.2 million cubic metres as part of a scheme by the Parrett Internal Drainage Board to restore ten floodplains in Somerset. In spring the water is drained away to enable the land to be used as pasture during the summer. The scheme is also used to encourage water birds.
