= King's Sedgemoor Drain =

Artificial drainage channel in Somerset, England

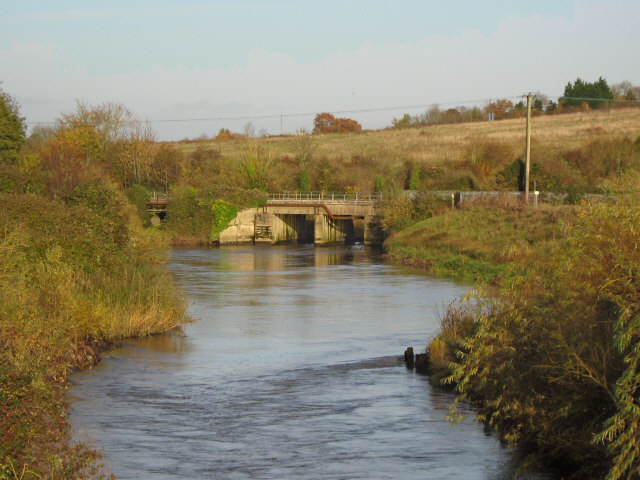
- King's Sedgemoor Drain near Dunball

Location
- Country: England
- State: Somerset
- Region: Somerset Levels

Physical characteristics
- Source: River Cary
  - location: Henley Corner, Somerset, England
  - coordinates: 51°05′26″N 2°48′28″W
- Mouth: River Parrett
  - location: Dunball, Somerset, England
  - coordinates: 51°09′42″N 2°59′19″W

King's Sedgemoor Drain is an artificial drainage channel which diverts the River Cary in Somerset, England, along the southern flank of the Polden Hills, to discharge into the River Parrett at Dunball near Bridgwater. As the name suggests, the channel is used to help drain the peat moors of King's Sedgemoor. There was opposition to drainage schemes from the local inhabitants, who feared that they would lose their common grazing rights. However, the main channel was constructed between 1791 and 1795, and despite some defects, brought some relief from flooding to the area.

The drain was upgraded during the Second World War, to provide a backup water supply for an armaments factory at Puriton, and again in 1972, when the Sowy River flood relief channel was built. The drain has hosted the National Fishing Championships, as it is well-stocked with fish, and is also an important haven for birds.

== Background ==
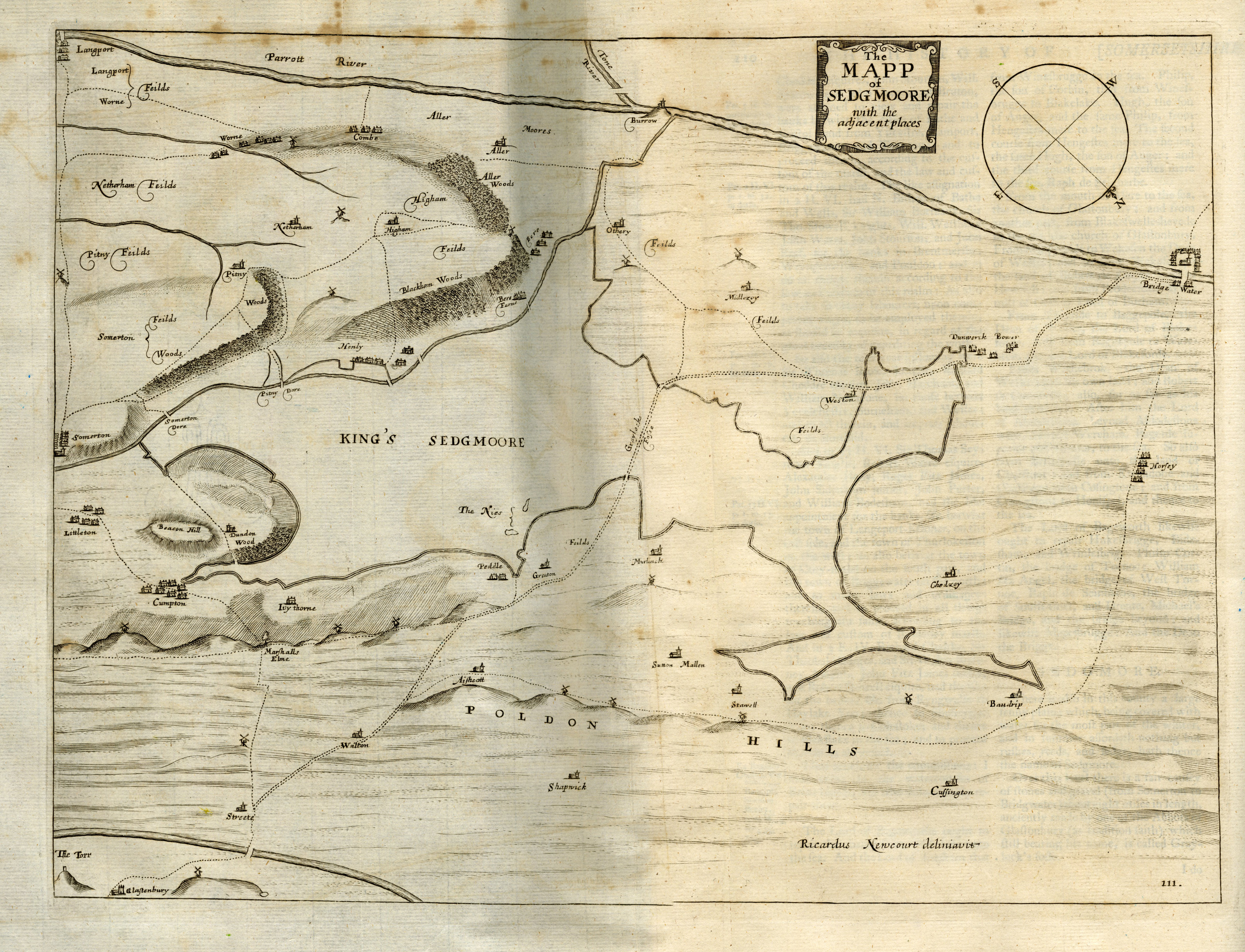
"The Map of Sedgemoor, with adjacent Parts" from "The history of imbanking and drayning" by William Dugdale (1662).

The area through which the drain runs was farmed as common land when it was owned by the Abbey at Glastonbury, but with its dissolution in 1539, the land was divided among owners, with the soil belonging to the Crown. Cornelius Vermuyden was active in the region in the mid 17th century, building small-scale drainage schemes at Cossington, Catcott, Huntspill and Puriton, but despite the devastation caused by extensive flooding in 1607, was unable to convince the communities of Sedgemoor of the benefits that a drainage scheme would bring, as they feared that improved pastures would prejudice their common rights.

King's Sedgemoor was described by Arthur Young in his travelogue of 1771. It was generally flooded, and the water had "no way to get off but by evaporation." Although he felt that its condition was a disgrace to the Nation, he was also convinced that it could be improved by drainage. Drainage schemes were promoted in 1772, 1776 and 1788, and Richard Locke published a map showing what might be achieved in the 1780s. All this came to nothing, as the commoners and some of the manorial lords resisted the plans, while there was well-documented fraud among those proposing the schemes. The 1776 scheme was in reality an attempt by Lord Bolinbroke to raise money to settle a gambling debt. However, a series of acts of Parliament were passed between 1777 and 1801, which authorised the construction of drainage schemes in the Somerset moors and levels.

== Construction ==
Sedgmoor Drainage Act 1791
- Act of Parliament
- Parliament of Great Britain
- Long title: An Act for draining and dividing a certain Moor, or Tract of Waste Land, called King's Sedgmoor, in the County of Somerset.
- Citation: 31 Geo. 3. c. 91
- Territorial extent: Great Britain

Dates
- Royal assent: 13 May 1791
- Commencement: 10 August 1790 (Note: Start of session.)

Status: Current legislation

Text of statute as originally enacted

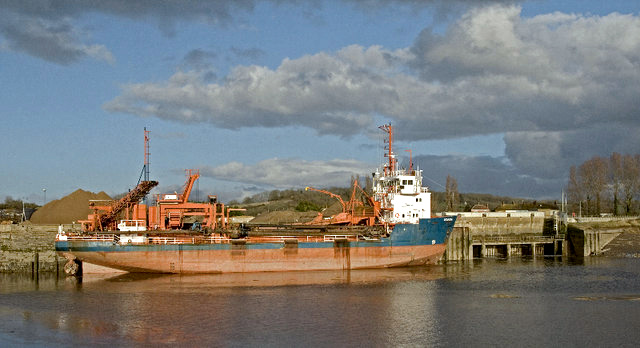
Dunball Wharf. To the right is Dunball Clyce where the King's Sedgemoor Drain flows into the River Parrett

The Sedgmoor Drainage Act 1791 (31 Geo. 3. c. 91) authorised improvements to the drainage of the peat lands of King's Sedgemoor. The existing outfalls for the moor were inadequate. Cowhouse Clyse, near Andersea on the River Parrett, was too high to work well, and Bennett Clyse, a little further downstream, was not working at all. The five commissioners who were appointed under the act proposed a new drainage channel from the area to an existing sluice called Dunball Clyse, and asked William White, a surveyor from Wedmore near Wells, to carry out a survey. White found a suitable route, but there were some misgivings, as the area is separated from the coast by a slightly higher ridge of clay, and the scheme involved cutting nearly 2.5 miles (4.0 km) of drain to a depth of 15 feet (4.6 m) through this ridge, in order to provide the necessary gradient for the water to flow. He was supported in this by John Billingsley, one of the commissioners who farmed near Sutton Mallet, but who had written a book on the agriculture of Somerset, and the drainage of the levels. He could see no alternative, and so the advice of the engineer William Jessop was sought. Jessop supported White and Billingsley in his assessment of the options, and so the route was adopted.

The 10.5-mile (16.9 km) channel of the King's Sedgemoor Drain was completed in 1795, running from the River Cary at Henley Corner to Dunball, to divert the River Cary around the south-western edge of the Polden Hills. The engineer for the scheme was Robert Anstice, who lived in Bridgwater and went on to become the first county surveyor for Somerset. Problems were experienced with new foundations for the sluice at Dunball, which was built on ground which had until 1677 been a meander in the river. White's plans had proposed running the channel further downstream to Nine Streams Reach, but this had been opposed by landowners, and so the clyse was built at Dunball. The unsuitable conditions at Dunball resulted in the clyse being built about 4 feet (1.2 m) too high, and the shallower gradient caused sedimentation in the channels. Earth banks, built from the spoil, caused the underlying peat to rise up in the centre of the drain. A timber floor in the drain was built to restrict this, but the recurrent problem of the peat rising up was not finally solved until the banks were moved further back and in many cases, spread over the adjoining fields.

The scheme included a number of new bridges, with the main ones being at Crandon, Bawdrip, Parchey and Greylake. Penning sluices were fitted to the bridges at Bawdrip and Greylake, to allow the water to be used for irrigation, but in many cases, the bridge openings were too small, with the result that water stacked up behind them in flood conditions. In addition to the main channel, which increased in width from 26.5 to 55 feet (8.1 to 16.8 m) as it approached Dunball, the "Eighteen Feet Rhyne" was built to drain the moor to the north of Henley Corner, and rhynes at Aller, Chedzoy, Shapwick and Street were also 18 feet (5.5 m) wide. Other rhynes were 15 feet (4.6 m) wide. When the scheme was finished, it had cost over £32,000. £15,000 of the total had been spent on engineering work, and the scheme resulted in improvements to the drainage of an area of 11,000 acres (4,500 ha).

== Maintenance ==
The next 140 years were marked by an inability to take action on the part of those responsible for the maintenance of the drainage scheme. Once completed, it came under the jurisdiction of the Commissioners of Sewers, and routine maintenance did not take place. In 1811, the commissioners pinned their hopes on the proposed Bristol to Taunton canal, which would have crossed the drain by an aqueduct, which would have included a new clyse at a lower level than the Dunball outlet, but the canal project came to nothing. The banks continued to slip, and the peat continued to rise up in the bottom of the drain. They asked Robert Anstice to produce a report on the condition of the drain in 1816, but it was 1818 before the report was produced and highlighted the poor state of repair of the system. They also asked for a report on ways to make the bridges wider, but nothing came of it. Ten years later, they commissioned another report, but the local landowners took matters into their own hands and asked Josiah Easton to inspect the drain.

Easton reported that the drain was now nearly useless, and that £10,000 would be needed to put it back into good order. In 1829, he published a proposal to improve the drain so that it would be navigable from Dunball to Yeovil. Drainage required the water levels to be lower, but navigation required them to be higher, and so the scheme came to nothing. The commissioners scoured the drain, but no real progress was made. In 1842, another report was commissioned, from a Mr. Glyn. His two alternatives were to lower the clyse at Dunball by 4 feet (1.2 m), and to convert the lower part of the channel into a reservoir. Steam engines would be used to pump water into it, and it would empty by gravity at low tide. The Commissioners were unsure whether their powers allowed them to start such work, so they did nothing. In 1844, with the clyse doors in imminent danger of collapse, they paid for the cill to be lowered by 20 inches (51 cm) and fitted new doors, but the moors still flooded during most winters.

The commissioners were replaced following the passing of the Land Drainage Act 1861 (24 & 25 Vict. c. 133). A special commission, which was only responsible for King's Sedgemoor, was created, but like their predecessors, they found that their powers were limited, and their ability to raise funds by rates was inadequate. A high tide in 1876 carried the clyse gates away, and the adjacent bridge had to be demolished for safety. Tides passed up the channel and flooded the moors. Work to construct a new bridge with tidal doors cost £16,000, and the area was impoverished by the debt. The Somersetshire Drainage Act 1877 (40 & 41 Vict. c. xxxvi) was another attempt to sort out the lack of administrative power, but no work was undertaken in King's Sedgemoor. Serious breaches of the banks occurred in 1872, 1891, 1894, 1924 and 1929.

== Modern era ==
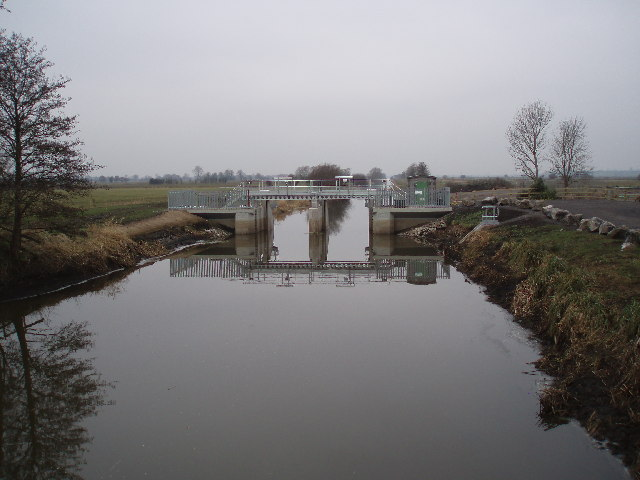
Greylake sluice on King's Sedgemoor Drain

The passing of the Land Drainage Act 1930 held promise for the future. The many bodies responsible for small parts of Somerset's flood defences were swept away, and replaced by the Somerset Catchment Board. More importantly, perhaps, they did not have to prove that benefits would occur to a particular community in order to issue rates for drainage work, but could raise rates based on the rateable values of properties. This should have worked, but they soon became apprehensive, and reverted to producing reports, which were not actioned. However, inactivity gave way to action in 1939, when a new engineer was appointed, who saw it as his job to direct what needed to be done. Work began on improvements to the King's Sedgemoor Drain in 1939. The items to be addressed were the size of the channel, the size of the bridges, and the size of Dunball clyse, all of which were too small. The onset of the Second World War, just a few months later, threatened to stop the scheme, but did not.

As part of the war effort, an explosives factory, ROF Bridgwater, was built at Puriton. The Catchment Board needed to be able to guarantee that 4.5 million gallons (20.5 Megalitres) of process water would be available to the factory every day. To this end, the Huntspill River was constructed, a little further to the north, which was essentially a revival of a plan by J. Aubrey Clark in 1853, to provide better drainage for the Brue valley. King's Sedgemoor drain was deemed to be a backup source for water, should the Huntspill scheme fail, and so all of the work which had been planned before the war started was completed, to ensure that the volume of water needed was always available. Greylake sluice was built by the Somerset Rivers Catchment Board in 1942, and used guillotine gates to control water levels. The original plaque commemorating its completion was incorporated into the new structure when the sluice was rebuilt in 2006.

The drain was upgraded in 1972, as part of a £1.4 million scheme to construct a flood relief channel for the River Parrett. The 7.5-mile (12.1 km) embanked channel, called the Sowy River, runs from Monks Leaze Clyse below Langport to the King's Sedgemoor Drain near Westonzoyland Airfield. Improvements to the drain included the relocation and rebuilding of the clyse at Dunball, to create a fresh water seal which prevents salt water from entering the drain where it joins the River Parrett. A further scheme for improvements to the Greylake Sluice was completed at a cost of £2.95 million in 2006, and resulted in the engineering contractor winning the 2006 Environment Agency Project Excellence Awards, for the health and safety and environmental risk aspects of the project. The main features of the new design were two tilting sluice gates, each 13 by 10 feet (4.0 by 3.0 m) contained in a structure which was only half as high as the previous structure, which allow water level management to be controlled in a more flexible manner.

Floodwater is removed from many of the moors of the Somerset Levels by pumping stations, which were originally steam-powered. These were superseded by diesel engines, and more recently by electric pumps. The King's Sedgemoor Drain is unusual in that it operates entirely by gravity. Consideration was given to replacing Dunball clyse with a pumping station in 2002, which would have allowed water to be discharged into the estuary at all states of the tide, but this course of action was not followed. Management of the Drain is the responsibility of the Environment Agency, whereas the numerous rhynes or drainage ditches which feed into the Drain are the responsibility of several internal drainage boards, who work together as the Parrett Consortium of Drainage Boards.

== Wildlife ==
In mid-2008, an eel-pass was installed at Greylake Sluice, consisting of an open-topped metal channel, fitted with bristles on its base, which allows glass eels returning from the Sargasso Sea to wiggle their way past the sluice. The channel is equipped with an infra-red camera, to allow the movement of eels to be monitored during the night. The installation, together with a similar one at Oath lock on the River Parrett, has provided valuable information on the migration and decline of eels. The Drain is well stocked with fish, and was used, together with the Huntspill River, as the location for the Division 1 National Fishing Championships in 2008.

At Greylake the Royal Society for the Protection of Birds has a reserve covering 270 acres (110 ha), where birds including Eurasian curlews, lapwings, snipe and redshanks can be seen in summer, with Bewick's swans, golden plovers, shovelers, teals and wigeons arriving in the winter.

== Water quality ==
The Environment Agency measure water quality of the river systems in England. Each is given an overall ecological status, which may be one of five levels: high, good, moderate, poor and bad. There are several components that are used to determine this, including biological status, which looks at the quantity and varieties of invertebrates, angiosperms and fish. Chemical status, which compares the concentrations of various chemicals against known safe concentrations, is rated good or fail.

The water quality of the King's Sedgemoor Drain was as follows in 2019.

Section	Ecological status	Chemical status	Length	Catchment	Channel
King's Sedgemoor Drain – Henley Sluice to mouth	Moderate	Fail	17.3 miles (27.8 km)	44.63 square miles (115.6 km^{2})	artificial

The data includes the Sowy River from the point at which it leaves the River Parrett. Like most rivers in the UK, the chemical status changed from good to fail in 2019, due to the presence of polybrominated diphenyl ethers (PBDE) and mercury compounds, neither of which had previously been included in the assessment.

== Route ==
In Roman times the course of the River Parrett near Puriton was quite different from that of today. It followed part of the route of the present day King's Sedgemoor Drain, forming almost a great loop along the southern flank of the Polden Hills.

The Drain starts at a narrow sluice at Henley Corner, near Henley, which diverts most of the flow of the River Cary into it. The old course of the River Cary continues westwards, while the drain heads north-west. Passing under a minor road at Cradle Bridge, it heads to Greylake Bridge, which carries the A361 over it. To the south, the parallel courses of the Langacre Rhyne and Sowy River also cross under the road, as they approach and run beside the Drain. Greylake Sluice is situated immediately after the bridge, and the three drains join about 1 mile (1.6 km) further on near Westonzoyland Airfield, which was formerly RAF Weston Zoyland. Just to the north of the bridge is the RSPB reserve, while to the south of the bridge there is an area of Pleistocene Burtle Beds, 22.9 acres (9.3 ha) of which have been a designated Site of Special Scientific Interest since 1987.

Westonzoyland village is a little further to the west, near where the Battle of Sedgemoor was fought in 1685. The drain passes close to the village, and then turns to follow a more northerly course, with bridges carrying minor roads at Parchey, with Chedzoy slightly further west, and at Bawdrip, which is to the north-east of the Drain. At Crandon Bridge the A39 road crosses the Drain to a 'T'-junction with the old course of the A39 to Glastonbury and the newer A39 spur to the M5 motorway. Passing to the south of Puriton, it turns first west and then south-west as it passes under the M5 motorway, the Bristol and Exeter Railway, and the A38 road in quick succession, to reach the River Parrett at Dunball clyse.

Point	Coordinates (Links to map resources)	OS Grid Ref	Notes
Dunball Clyce	51.161°N 2.988°W	ST309407	Junction with River Parrett
Sowy River Junction	51.112°N 2.888°W	ST379351	River Parret flood channel
Greylake Sluice	51.106°N 2.863°W	ST396344	
Henley Corner	51.090°N 2.808°W	ST435327	Junction with River Cary

== Bibliography ==
- Billingsley, John (1798). General View of the Agriculture of the County of Somerset. R. Cruttwell.
- Dunning, Robert, ed. (2004). "A History of the County of Somerset: Volume 8: The Poldens and the Levels". British History Online.
- Gathercole, Clare (1998). "Down End". English Heritage Extensive Urban Survey. South West Heritage Trust. Archived from the original on 8 February 2021.
- East, Gordon (February 1937). "Land Utilization in England at the End of the Eighteenth Century". The Geographical Journal. 89 (2). Blackwell Publishing on behalf of The Royal Geographical Society (with the Institute of British Geographers): 156–172. Bibcode:1937GeogJ..89..156E. doi:10.2307/1786126. JSTOR 1786126.
- Otter, R. A. (1994). Civil Engineering Heritage: Southern England. Thomas Telford. ISBN 978-0-7277-1971-3.
- Skempton, Sir Alec; et al. (2002). A Biographical Dictionary of Civil Engineers in Great Britain and Ireland: 1500 to 1830. Thomas Telford Publishers. ISBN 978-0-7277-2939-2.
- Williams, Michael (1970). The Draining of the Somerset Levels. Cambridge University Press. ISBN 978-0-521-07486-5.
