= Sowy River =

Artificial drainage channel in Somerset, England

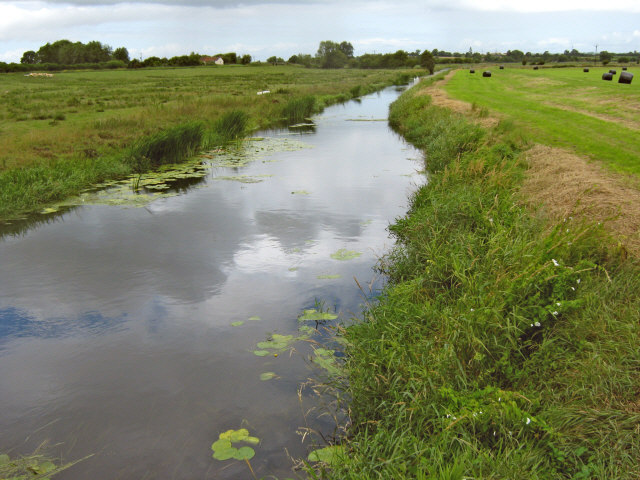
- The Sowy River at Stathe

Location
- Country: England
- State: Somerset

Physical characteristics
- Source: River Parrett
  - coordinates: 51°02′41″N 2°50′38″W
- Mouth: King's Sedgemoor Drain
  - coordinates: 51°06′43″N 02°53′16″W
- Length: 12 km (7.5 mi)

The Sowy River is an artificial drainage channel in Somerset, England, designed to act as a flood relief channel for the River Parrett. Water from the Parrett can be diverted into it just below Langport, and is conveyed to the King's Sedgemoor Drain, which discharges back into the Parrett much nearer to its outfall into the Bristol Channel. Following extensive flooding of the surrounding land in 2014, new culverts to carry the river under the A372 road at Beer Wall were constructed, and a three-year project to raise the banks and widen the channel to increase its capacity was undertaken.

== History ==
The Sowy River is a 7.5-mile (12.1 km) embanked channel which starts at Monks Leaze clyce below Langport, and carries excess water from the River Parrett to the King's Sedgemoor Drain, from where it flows to the estuary by gravity, rejoining the Parrett near Dunball wharf. Construction of the channel, together with improvements to the King's Sedgemoor Drain and the rebuilding of the clyce at Dunball, to create a freshwater seal which prevents saltwater entering the drain from the river, cost £1.4 million. The scheme was first proposed in 1961, following serious flooding in October 1960, when some 78 square miles (200 km^{2}) of the Somerset levels were inundated. A channel with a proposed capacity of 1,060 cubic feet per second (30 m^{3}/s) was proposed, but arguments about the cost of such a scheme resulted in the capacity being lowered to 600 cubic feet per second (17 m^{3}/s). However, the bridges and sluices were either built to cope with the larger flow rates, or made so that they could be easily altered, if funding became available. Construction began in 1969 and was completed in 1972. The scheme resulted in less flooding on Aller Moor.

During 2009 and 2010 work was undertaken to upgrade sluice gates, watercourses and culverts to enable seasonal flooding of Southlake Moor during the winter diverting water from the Sowy River onto the moor. It has the capacity to hold 1.2 million cubic metres as part of a scheme by the Parrett Internal Drainage Board to restore ten floodplains in Somerset. In spring the water is drained away to enable the land to be used as pasture during the summer. The scheme is also used to encourage water birds. In January 2010, when bird numbers were at their peak, some 4,000 wigeon, lapwing and teal were recorded on the moor, while other species sighted included Bewick's swan, pintail, shoveler, golden plover and gadwall.

In January 2014, the A372 road at Beer Wall flooded, as culverts carrying the Sowy River and Langacre Rhyne were unable to cope with the volume of water. After water levels subsided a little, the road remained closed as pumps were placed on it to drain the surrounding land. The road reopened in March, but was closed again in September as flood prevention work began. A trench was cut through the road to the east of the existing culvert for the Langacre Rhyne, where new culverts were to be constructed. In order to keep the road open during the winter, two temporary bridges were installed, one to carry the road and another for pedestrians. The road bridge, with a span of 52 feet (16 m), was placed in position in just three hours, and remained in use for 26 weeks. Four new culverts were built, each 9.8 by 6.9 feet (3.0 by 2.1 m), two to carry the realigned Langacre Rhyne, and two to carry part of the flow of the Sowy River. The culverts and the reconstruction of the road over the top of them was funded by the Department for Transport, and the road reopened in July 2015.

The next phase of the project was managed by the recently formed Somerset Rivers Authority, and involved re-routing the Langacre Rhyne and the Sowy River through the new culverts. The work included the construction of foundation slabs for two tilting weirs, and this was funded by the Heart of the South West Local Enterprise Partnership. Beginning in April 2016, the two tilting weirs were built, and a bank to maintain the separation between the Sowy River and the new course of the Langacre Rhyne was constructed. This was the start of a three-year project to increase the capacity of the Sowy River and King's Sedgemoor Drain.

While the Sowy River in theory had a design capacity of 600 cubic feet per second (17 m^{3}/s), in practice this was not achieved, and where required, the right bank was raised by up to 1.6 feet (0.5 m) between Monk's Leaze Clyce and the A372 at Beer Wall in order to achieve this capacity. The capacity of the channel between Beer Wall and the A361 at Greylake Bridge was increased to 850 cubic feet per second (24 m^{3}/s) by raising both banks by up to 1 foot (0.3 m) in places, and by increasing the width of the channel on the right bank. Between Graylake Bridge and the King's Sedgemoor Drain, similar work was undertaken, but only the left bank needed raising, and widening took place on the right bank. Finally, the capacity of the King's Sedgemoor Drain between the Sowy outfall and Parchey Bridge was increased to 950 cubic feet per second (27 m^{3}/s) by raising of both banks by up to 1.6 feet (0.5 m), and by widening the channel on the right bank. In one place, a backwater was created, up to 20 feet (6 m) wide, leaving an island some 16 feet (5 m) wide between the new channel and the old one. Where widening was carried out, the new channel included a shelf 1 foot (0.3 m) below the normal summer water level, to increase the range of habitats available. The scheme is not expected to completely prevent flooding of Middle Moor and Aller Moor, but the frequency and severity of such flooding is expected to be significantly reduced as a result of the work.

== Water Quality ==
The Environment Agency measure water quality of the river systems in England. Each is given an overall ecological status, which may be one of five levels: high, good, moderate, poor and bad. There are several components that are used to determine this, including biological status, which looks at the quantity and varieties of invertebrates, angiosperms and fish. Chemical status, which compares the concentrations of various chemicals against known safe concentrations, is rated good or fail.

The Sowy River and the King's Sedgemoor Drain are assessed as a single unit, and water quality was as follows in 2019.

Section	Ecological Status	Chemical Status	Length	Catchment	Channel
King's Sedgemoor Drain - Henley Sluice to mouth	Moderate	Fail	17.3 miles (27.8 km)	44.63 square miles (115.6 km^{2})	artificial

Like many waterways in the UK, the chemical status changed from good to fail in 2019, due to the presence of polybrominated diphenyl ethers (PBDE) and mercury compounds, neither of which had previously been included in the assessment.

== Bibliography ==
- EA (2020). "The Preferred Option" (PDF). River Sowy and King’s Sedgemoor Drain Enhancements Scheme. Environment Agency. Archived (PDF) from the original on 27 January 2022.
- Otter, R. A. (1994). Civil Engineering Heritage: Southern England. Thomas Telford. ISBN 978-0-7277-1971-3.
- SRA (2021). "River Sowy – King's Sedgemoor Drain enhancements". Annual Report 2020-21. Somerset Rivers Authority.
