= Dunball =

Hamlet in Somerset, England

Coordinates: 51°09′46″N 2°59′16″W

- Location within Somerset
- OS grid reference: ST311409
- Unitary authority: Somerset
- Ceremonial county: Somerset
- Region: South West
- Country: England
- Sovereign state: United Kingdom
- Post town: BRIDGWATER
- Postcode district: TA7
- Dialling code: 01278
- Police: Avon and Somerset
- Fire: Devon and Somerset
- Ambulance: South Western
- UK Parliament: Bridgwater

Dunball is a small hamlet west of the village of Puriton and close to the town of Bridgwater, Somerset, England.

Just north of Dunball is Down End which is the site of Down End Castle a motte-and-bailey castle, which has been designated as a Scheduled Ancient Monument.

Located on the A38, adjacent to Junction 23 of the M5 motorway, it hosts a wharf on the River Parrett, created in 1844 by Bridgwater coal merchants, which is the only part of the Port of Bridgwater still in commercial use today. Dunball also has a small industrial estate, built on the site of the Royal Ordnance Factory's hostel blocks; and a hotel.

Hotel at Dunball with its 21st century additions (the left and right bays and side wings). It was originally known as the Greenhill Arms, after the Greenhill family who were Lords of the Manor of Puriton until 1920. In the 1980s and 1990s it became the Henry Fielding, adopting its present name in the early 2000s after extensive rebuilding

The wharf was formerly linked to the Bristol and Exeter Railway by a rail track which crossed the A38, on the right hand side of the hotel. The link was built in 1876 by coal merchants, and was originally operated as a horse-drawn tramway. It was removed during the Beeching Axe and Dunball also lost its railway station on 5 October 1964, which had opened in 1873. The wharf was used during World War II to bring Welsh coal to the nearby Royal Ordnance Factory, ROF Bridgwater. The wharf is now used for landing stone products, mainly marine sand and gravels dredged in the Bristol Channel.

The King's Sedgemoor Drain drains into the River Parrett at Dunball, adjacent to the wharf, via a clyse. The clyse has been moved from its original location and it now obstructs the entrance to a small harbour adjacent to the wharf. During the Winter flooding of 2013–14 on the Somerset Levels high volume pumps from the Netherlands were installed at Dunball.

River silt was dredged from the river in this locality in order to make Bath bricks, an early type of cleaning agent with a mild scouring action.

== Port of Bridgwater ==
Under an 1845 act of parliament the Port of Bridgwater extends from Brean Down to Hinkley Point in Bridgwater Bay, and parts of the rivers Parrett (to Bridgwater), River Brue and River Axe. Although no ships now dock in the town of Bridgwater; in 2001 103,613 (metric) tonnes of cargo were handled within the area of the Port Authority (compared to more than 200,000 tons (approximately equivalent to metric tonnes) in 1878), most of which were stone products through the wharf at Dunball.
