= 2013–14 United Kingdom winter floods =

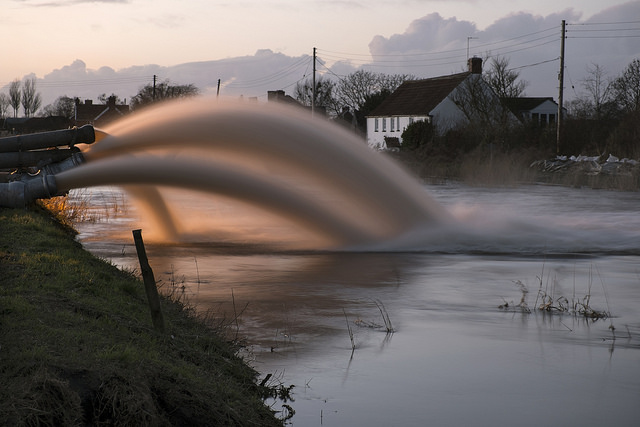
- Emergency pumps were brought in to drain the Somerset levels.
- Date: 5 December 2013 – 25 February 2014
- Location: United Kingdom
- Deaths: approx. 7

Severe winter storms caused floods in the United Kingdom in 2013–2014. The south of England saw heavy rainfalls associated with these storms which caused widespread flooding, power cuts and major disruptions to transport. Economically, the worst affected areas were Somerset, Devon, Dorset and Cornwall in the south west and the Thames Valley in the south east.

The Met Office reported the storms produced the wettest 1 December to 31 January since 1876; a local authority report states the winter as a whole, from the beginning of December until the end of February, was the wettest recorded in the UK since records began in 1766. Parts of South East England received almost two and a half times the amount of rainfall that they would normally expect.

The flood phenomena ranged from coastal flooding, pluvial flooding, fluvial flooding to groundwater flooding. The flooding took over most of the Somerset Levels and saw the main railway line to Cornwall and West Devon at Dawlish severed for several weeks.

== Meteorological history ==
A series of low pressure areas developed or formed over North America explosively deepening over the Atlantic/gulf stream before reaching the European coast. An Omega Block developed over northern Norway/Scandinavia which prevented the lows moving east over Europe, with a series of lows "dying" to the northwest of the British Isles. The blocking pattern over northern Norway led to a severe drought and forest fires there in early 2014.

=== Time line ===
  - 19 December 2013 Cyclone Dirk hit the UK.
  - Network Rail imposed speed restrictions from 16:00 23 December. Network Rail described the damage to rail infrastructure in southern England worse than seen during the St. Jude storm in October.
  - Saturated ground led to localised flooding in southern England, as the storm brought up to 60 mm (2.4 in) of rain to the UK. A major incident was declared in the region of Leatherhead and Dorking with Fire Brigade unions calling off a planned strike in Surrey and Kent. An Environment Agency spokesman said flooding in Kent and Sussex were the worst to hit the area since Autumn 2000.
  - 100,000 homes reported without power across Southern England.
- 3 January – Strong winds and high tides bring flooding to large parts of Western England, Wales and Scotland.
- 24 January – Sedgemoor District Council in Somerset declares a "major incident" in flooded areas as forecasters warn of more rain.
- 25 January – Trees are uprooted and structural damaged caused to buildings by lightning as a heavy rainstorm hits the Midlands region.
- 30 January – Figures released by the Met Office indicate Southern England and parts of the Midlands have experienced their highest January rainfall since records began in 1910. The announcement comes as military personnel prepare to help residents in flooded areas of Somerset.
- 5 February – Part of the South Devon Railway sea wall carrying the railway line linking London with the west of England is washed away by a powerful storm that has hit the UK overnight. Thousands of homes are also left without electricity. Prime Minister David Cameron announces that an extra £100 million will be spent on dealing with the aftermath of the floods that have hit the UK.
- 6 February – The Ministry of Defence sends around 40 Royal Marines to the Somerset Levels to help with flood protection as more storms are expected. The Government also provides an extra £30 million for repairs.
- 8 February –
  - Large areas of England and Wales are under flood warnings as another storm arrives. The Somerset Levels are the worst affected area.
  - Rail links to South West England are cut off by the storms.

== Impact ==
=== Coastal flooding ===
The period began on 5 December 2013 when a deep low pressure area moved from the Atlantic over Scotland and the North Sea inducing a storm surge in the Irish Sea and North Sea coasts of the United Kingdom. In the North Sea some of the highest level tides were recorded in the Humber and Thames estuaries, exceeding levels which occurred during the disastrous North Sea flood of 1953. Flooding occurred in Tyneside, Teesside, along the Yorkshire coast, around the Humber and the Wash, where in particular the town of Boston, Lincolnshire was badly affected by when the high tide overtopped defences.

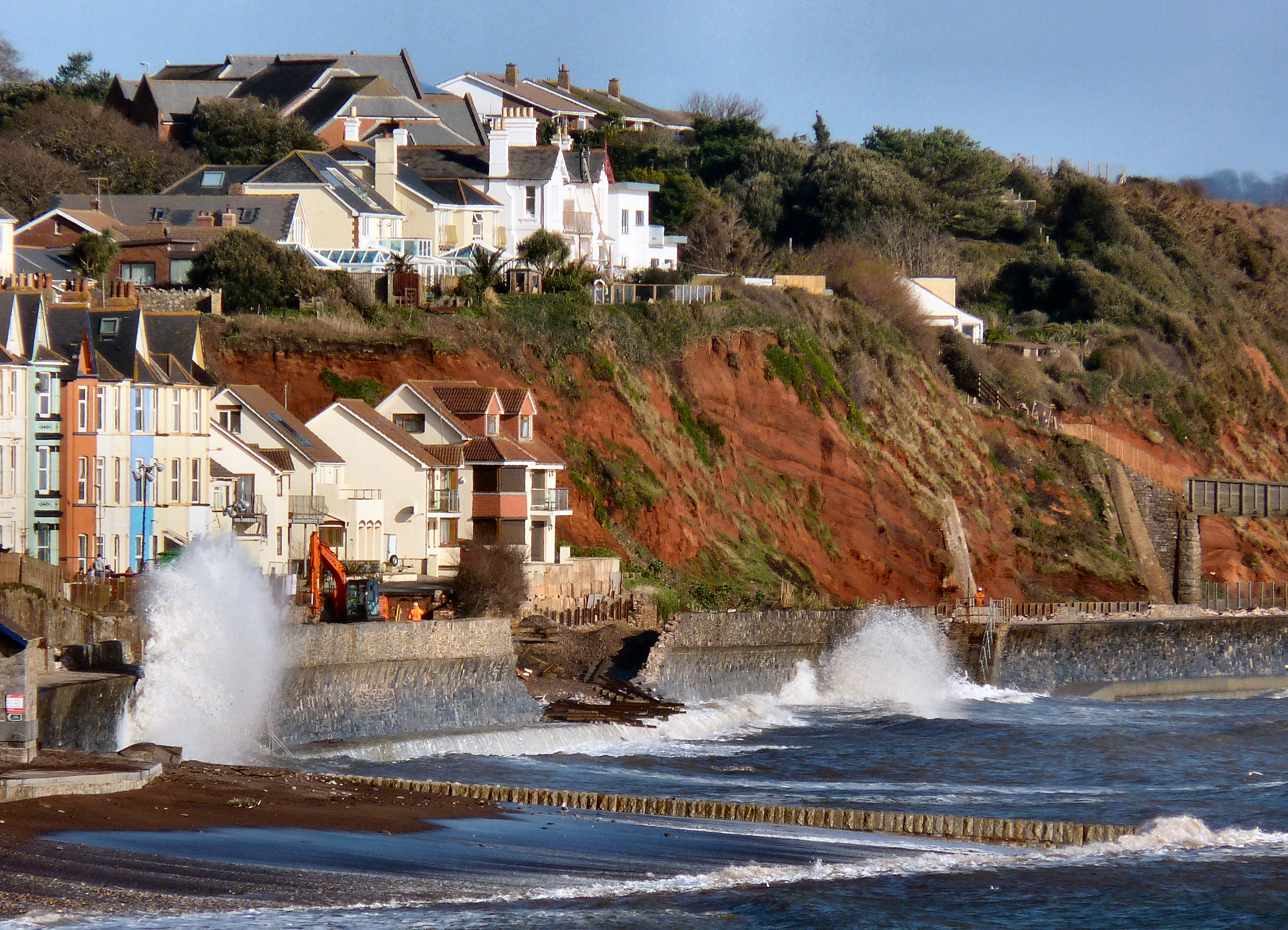
Breached seawall and railway at Dawlish, Devon

Coastal flooding particularly affected the south and west of the UK, with severe damage reported in Wales, Cornwall, Devon and Dorset. A particularly notable event occurred on 5 February when the seawall and railway line were breached at Dawlish. Jubilee Pool in Penzance, Cornwall suffered "serious structural damage" due to waves overtopping the pool during storms.

==== The Riviera Line and transport disruption ====
The only railway that runs south-west of Exeter was severed on 3 February when a 165 ft (50 m) section of the Riviera Line track was damaged at Dawlish. Network Rail said it had pulled all repair staff away from working on washed-away track on 4 February. A section of the town's sea wall was later reported to have been washed away along with a section of the track. A Network Rail spokesman estimated "hundreds of tonnes" of ballast had been dislodged from under tracks after they had "taken a real pounding from the sea". In a press release, First Great Western had initially said the line would only be closed until Wednesday as a result of the "poor weather conditions", but this was extended the until the end of the week.

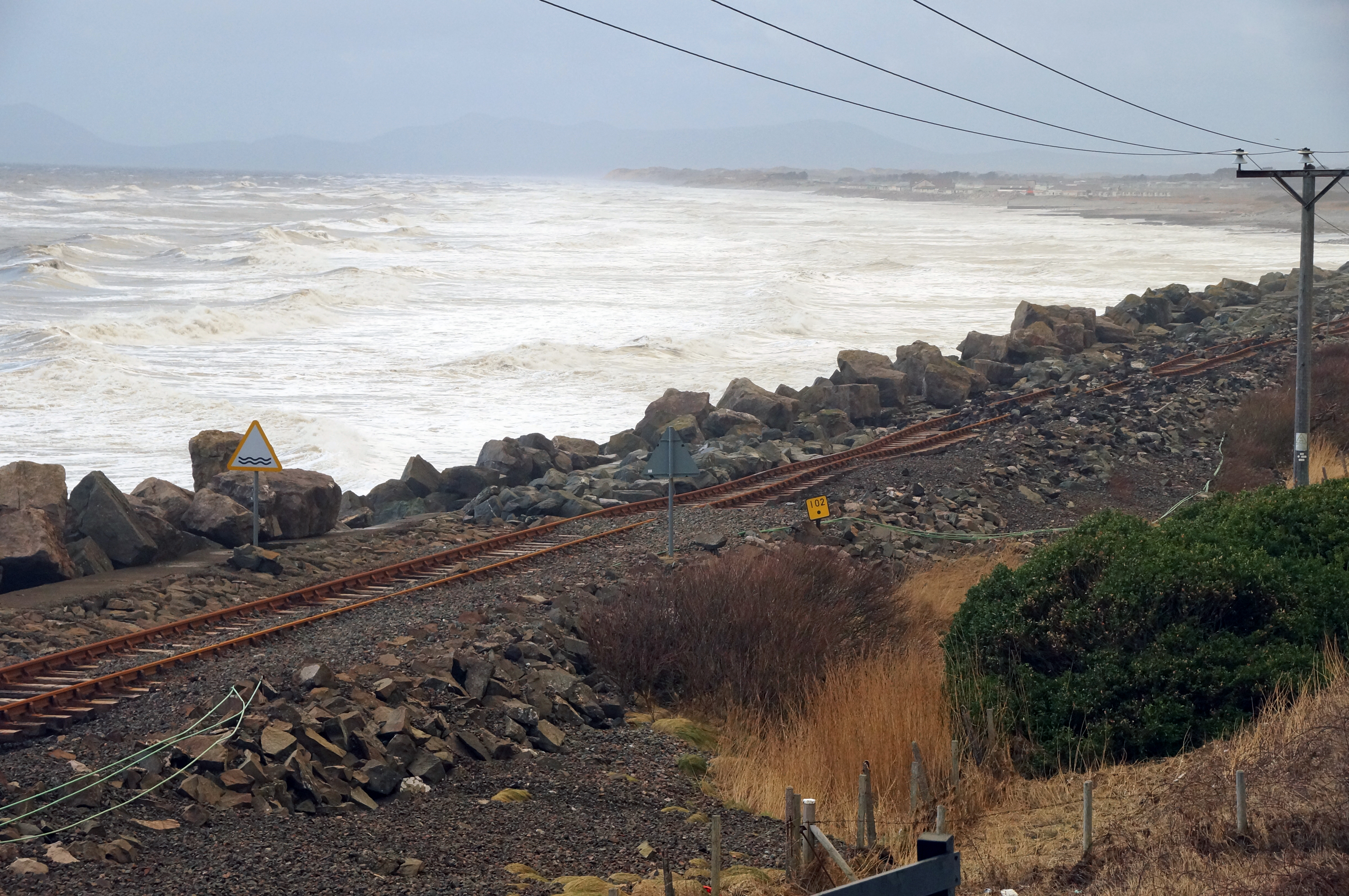
Wave damage caused 3 January at Llanaber railway station

High tides lashed Plymouth's Hoe seafront and the nearby Barbican. Near Exeter, firefighters rescued a man from a vehicle stuck in floodwater. Sea defences, walls and footpaths were damaged, including at Newlyn Green on 4 February. The Tamar Bridge between Plymouth in Devon and Saltash in Cornwall was closed to all traffic for a period after wind speeds surpassed 70 mph (110 km/h).

It was reckoned that the storms had caused more than £4m worth of damage across Cornwall in a month.

David Cameron chaired his first COBRA meeting of the year and announced an extra £100m for flood works on 5 February.

Meanwhile, powerful waves continued to thrash the exposed coastline railway line at Dawlish and slightly damaged Dawlish station itself. A wave measuring more than 70 ft (21 m) was recorded off the coast of Penzance. A flood buoy nearby triggered a reading of 74.8 ft (22.8 m) at 3 am.

A Department for Transport source said that the "most pressing issue" was to get the line up and running as soon as possible, "but equally it is clear it is important we look at the long term as well." Lib Dem MP for Torbay, Adrian Sanders, said the loss of the main line was "a disaster" and called on the Transport Secretary to intervene.

A landslip on the West of England Main Line at Crewkerne led to Somerset cutting off Exeter's railways (apart from the Tarka Line to Barnstaple in its county) on 8 February. Repairs were initially expected to take a week, but an inspection found the track was safe for slow moving trains. The line re-opened and a limited service was restored on 9 February after signalling problems were resolved. The alternative route along the Bristol to Exeter line was flooded on the Somerset Levels for longer.

=== Inland flooding ===
The number of properties flooded was less than in the 2007 United Kingdom floods and was akin to the Autumn 2000 western Europe floods. During this flood more than 200,000 sandbags were used.

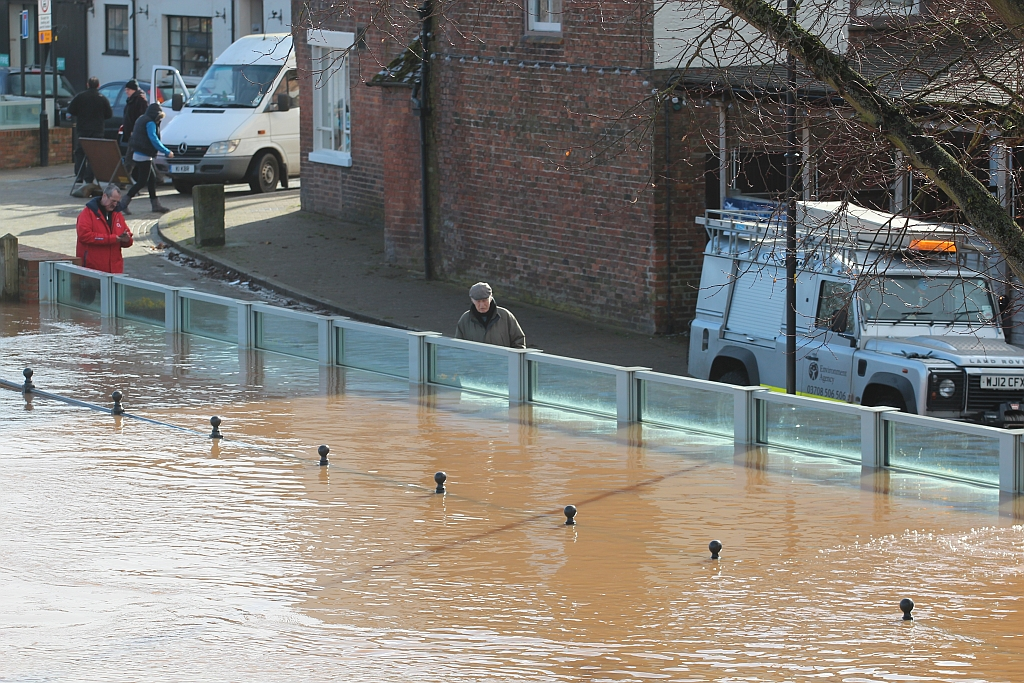
Flood protection in Upton-upon-Severn

==== Severn catchment ====
Flooding on the middle and lower reaches of the River Severn were similar in magnitude to those experienced during the 2007 United Kingdom floods.

==== Somerset Levels ====
The 2012 Great Britain and Ireland floods had brought severe flooding to the Somerset Levels. During December 2013 and January 2014 heavy rainfall led to extensive flooding on the Somerset Levels with over 600 houses and 17,000 acres (6,900 ha) of agricultural land, including North Moor, Curry and Hay Moors and Greylake, affected. The village of Thorney was abandoned and Muchelney cut off. Northmoor Green, which is more commonly known as Moorland was also severely affected. It was said that the government had not been quick enough to react and provide assistance to flooded communities. Flood relief activities included the use of rescue boats and the army. High volume pumps were brought in from the Netherlands and installed at several points to try to relieve the flooding. Prince Charles and several senior politicians visited the area.

Controversy arose about the role of the Environment Agency, with claims that the need for ongoing dredging of the main rivers had been neglected. However, Professor of Water Management at Cardiff University, and other hydrologists made clear that dredging does not offer a useful solution to flooding on the Levels.

==== Mid Surrey to Mid Kent ====
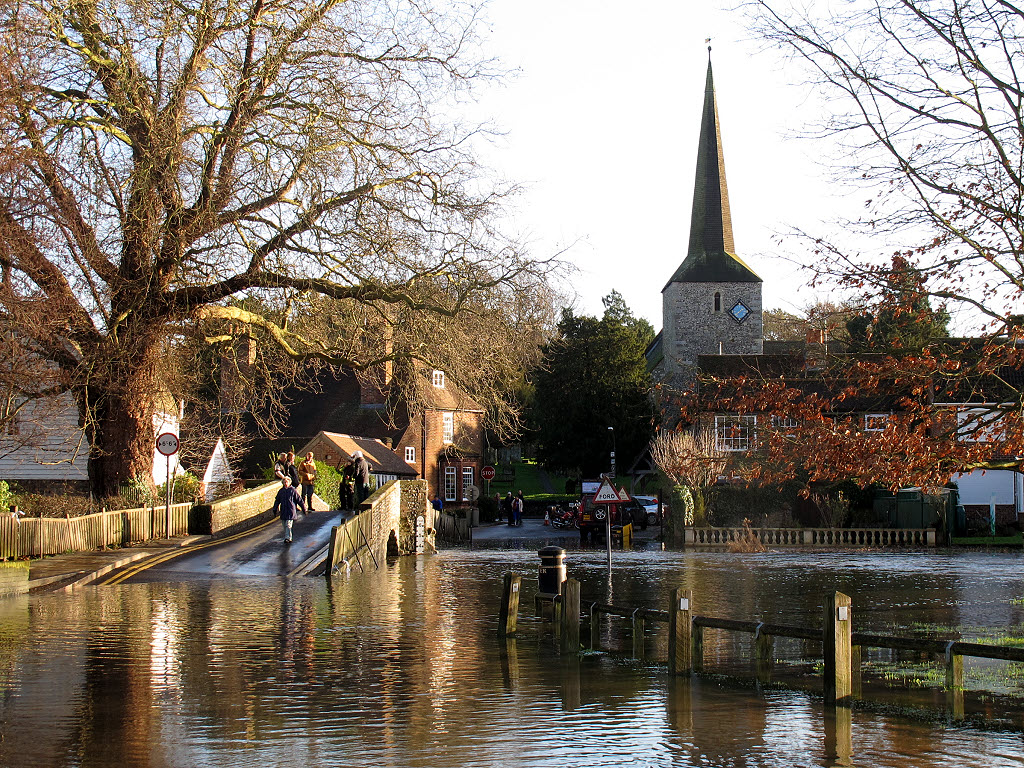
Flooding on the River Darent Eynsford, Kent 26 December 2013

A stormy period from the 23–27 December 2013 brought heavy rainfall to southern England, especially in a swathe from Dorset through Hampshire, Surrey and Kent. The first storm brought travel disruptions, especially as the flooding affecting Yalding and the electrical substations at Gatwick Airport leaving the northern terminal without power on Christmas Eve. After Cyclone Dirk on Christmas Day, saturated ground led to localised flooding in southern England, as the storm brought up to 60mm of rain to the UK. A major incident was declared including parts of Leatherhead and Dorking; Fire Brigade unions calling off a planned strike for the counties. An Environment Agency spokesman said flooding in Kent and Sussex was the worst since Autumn 2000. Surrey County Council produced statutory investigation reports, documenting responsibilities, actions, next steps and the estimation of homes internally flooded, in total, across its other parts (eight districts) less acutely affected than its Thames Valley three districts.

==== Thames Valley ====
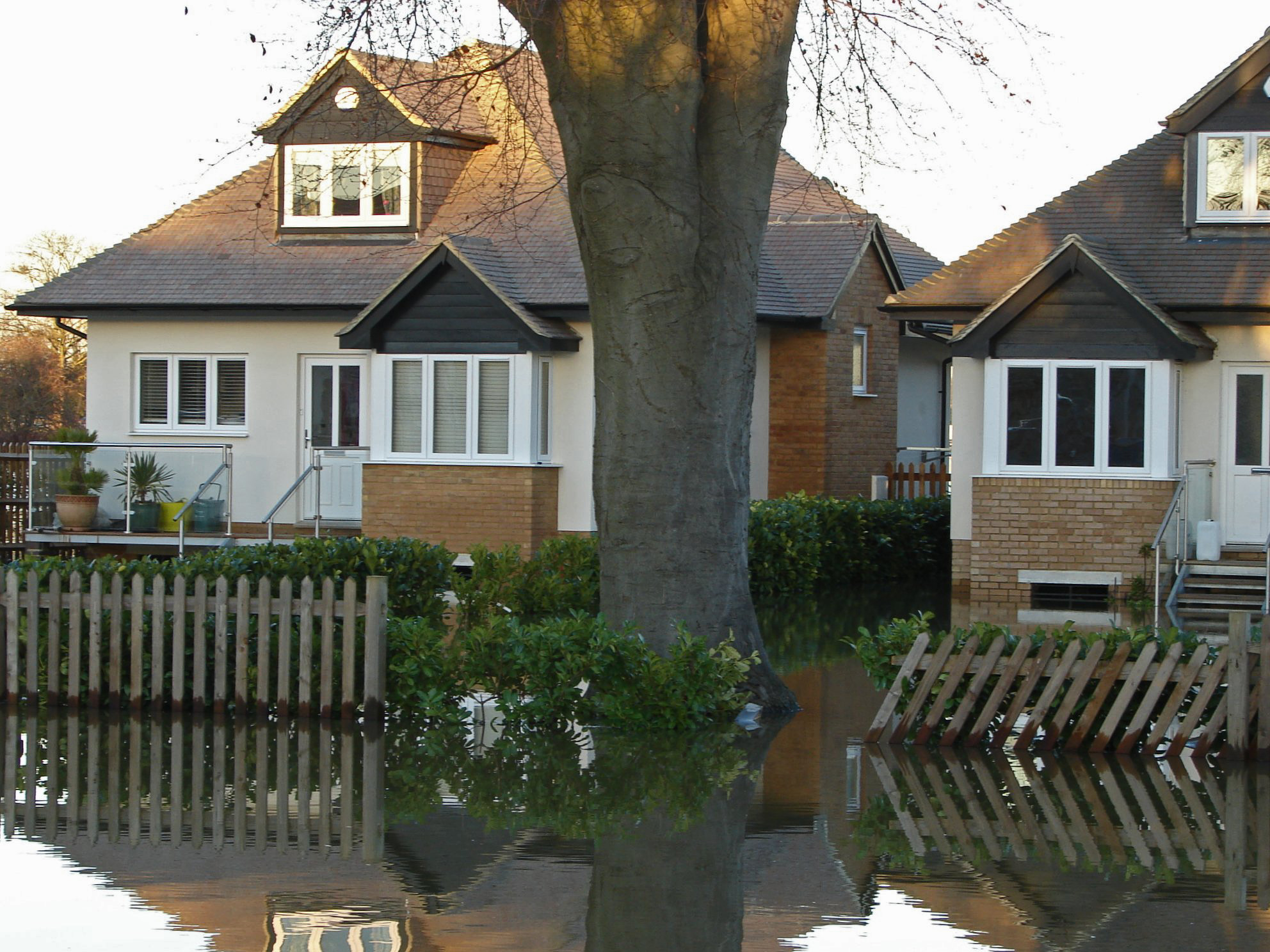
Flooded gardens Chertsey January 2014

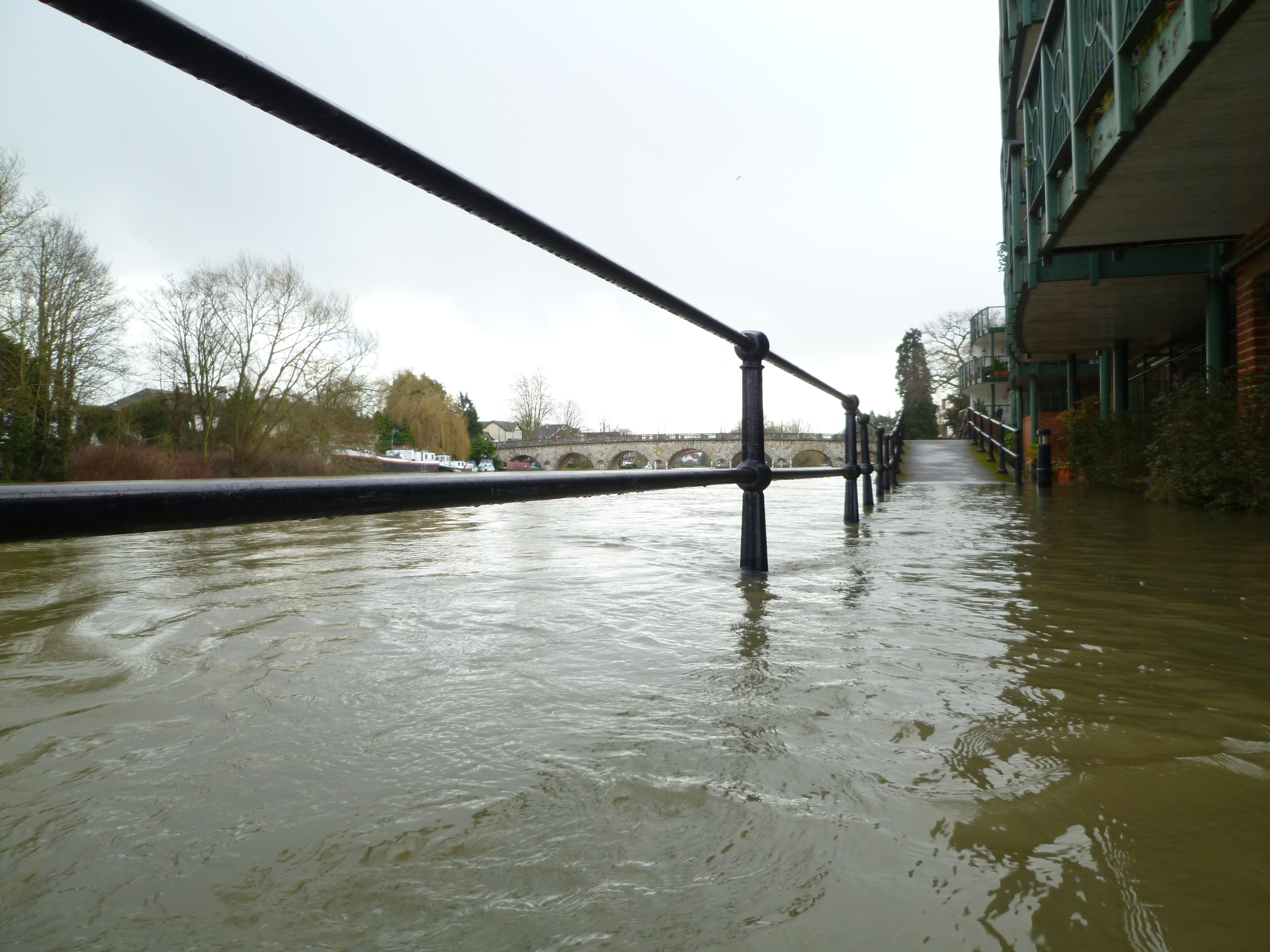
Heavy flooding at Maidenhead Bridge, January 2014

The flooding in the three north-west Boroughs of Surrey was predominately due to the Thames. It was caused by unprecedented rainfall during the winter 2013/2014 period (275% in Surrey compared with an average winter). There were approximately 1170 incidents of internal property flooding in Runnymede during winter 2013/2014; approximately 130 in Spelthorne; and about 100 in Elmbridge. The Thames's peak flow was assessed as having a 1 in 15–20 annual chance Shepperton.

Many residents in Wraysbury and Datchet berated the bank-damaging flows admitted into the Jubilee River, an anabranch for Windsor and Maidenhead. They blamed this sluice-controlled flow for augmenting the Thames which caused them flooding.

A Surrey County Council investigation report states the winter as a whole, from the beginning of December until the end of February, was the wettest recorded in the UK since records began in 1766. Parts of South East England received almost two and a half times the amount of rainfall that they would normally expect.

For two days in February, the River Ash flooded at least 80 homes, their grounds, garages and/or outbuildings in Staines-upon-Thames. Slow flow into the swollen Thames created flooding pinchpoints of two Colne distributaries into the Staines Aqueduct owned by Thames Water which briefly burst its banks. The latter said it had been following an existing three-party protocol. The EA replaced its inadequate sluice quickly. The Council's resultant section 19 Report was published on 20 April 2015. It states "the primary source of flooding that contributed to this flooding incident was fluvial in nature; the Environment Agency is the lead on managing fluvial flood risk...The EA owns and operates a sluice gate which controls flow from River Colne to the River Ash. This...is designed to ensure there is always a base flow in the River Ash to maintain the ecosystem of the river. This sluice gate adjusts automatically to send flow into the River Ash as needed. In the February event the EA overrode the automatic settings on this gate to control flooding. On 9 February (morning), EA reported that the Hythe End intake gates to the Aqueduct were fully closed. And that from this point, the Aqueduct was being fed solely with floodwater originating from the County Ditch and Wraysbury River. Thames Water increased the pumping rate from 270 million litres-a-day to 350 million litres-a-day from its Birch Green pumping station in an attempt to control flood levels. On 9 February, according to the EA, they asked Thames Water to close the Moor Lane sluice gate, which is located on the Aqueduct. Thames Water claimed to have no record of receiving that request and as a consequence, the gate was not closed... ...the Aqueduct had partially collapsed while causing significant damage. LLFA Surrey County Council had no direct flood risk management functions during the event. [M]odelling work due...by the EA...will inform more robust water management measures in the future.

The army dispensed free sandbags to Wraysbury victims. In Datchet, Princes William and Harry helped with defences at a road including a school which then closed for months.

The Thames Barrier was used on an unprecedented level during this period. The operational use of the gates that are designed to prevent London flooding, span the River Thames between Silvertown and Charlton, quadrupled and accounted for nearly half of the barriers fluvial flooding closures since it was built in 1983.

==== Dorset ====
The River Stour in Dorset burst its banks and 100 residents were evacuated.

== See also ==
- 2018–19 European winter
- 2018 British Isles cold wave
