= Northmoor =

Northmoor or North Moor may refer to:

== Places ==
- Northmoor, Devon, England
- Northmoor, Dulverton, an estate in Somerset, England
- Northmoor, Oxfordshire, England
- Northmoor, Missouri, USA
- Northmoor Country Club, a golf course in Highland Park, Illinois, USA, and site of the 1975 Illinois Open Championship
- Northmoor Green, a village in Somerset, England
- North Moor, a protected area in Scotland

== Fiction ==
- Northmoor, a plutonium processing plant in the BBC drama Edge of Darkness
