= Winter flooding of 2013–14 on the Somerset Levels =

Flooding in Somerset, England

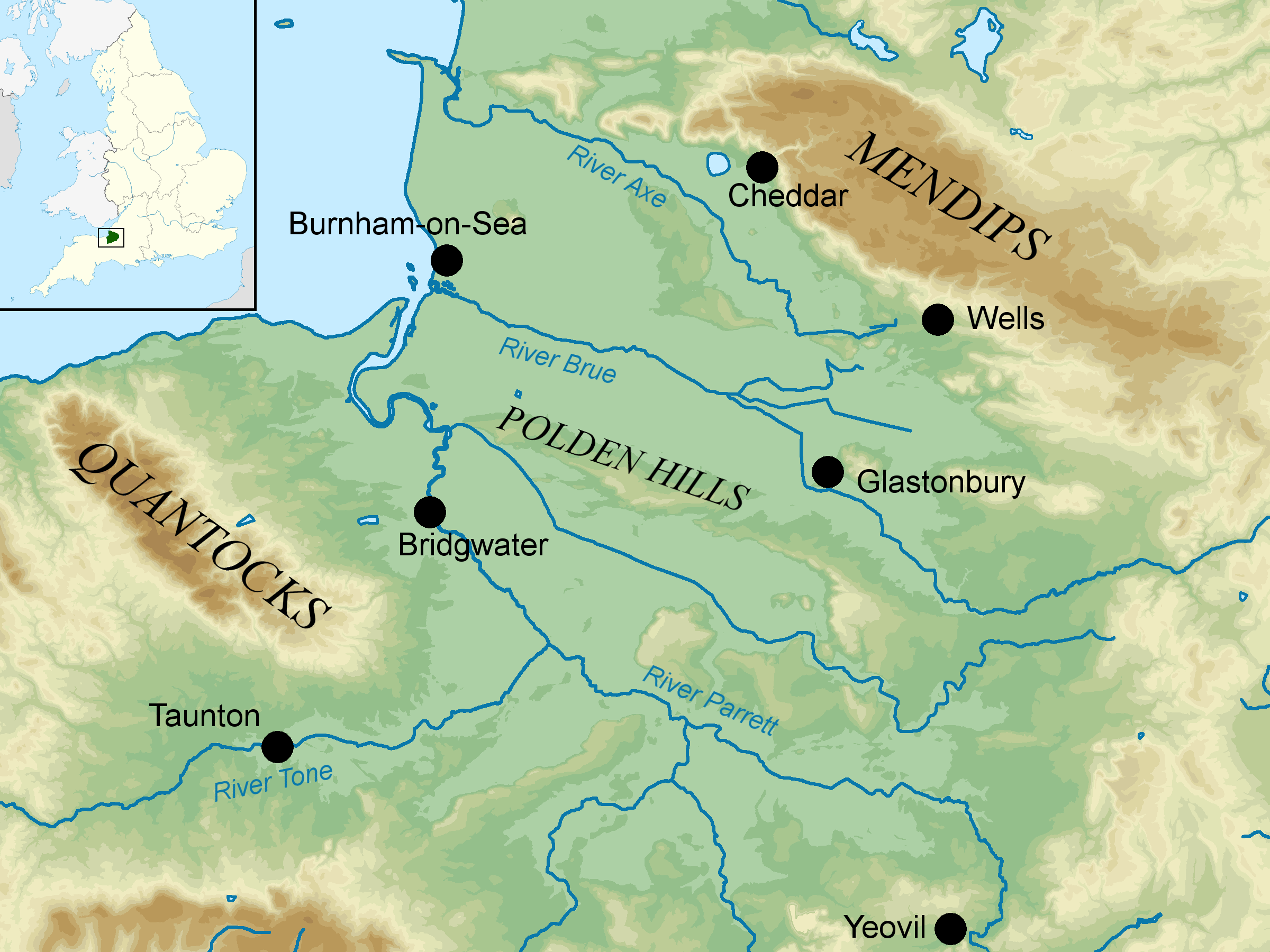
Map showing the Somerset Levels and the surrounding area. Height: 0-20 m 20-40 m 40-60 m 60-80 m 80-100 m / 100-120 m 120-140 m 140-160 m 160-18 m 180-200 m / 200-230 m 230-260 m 260-300 m 300-384 m; Source=

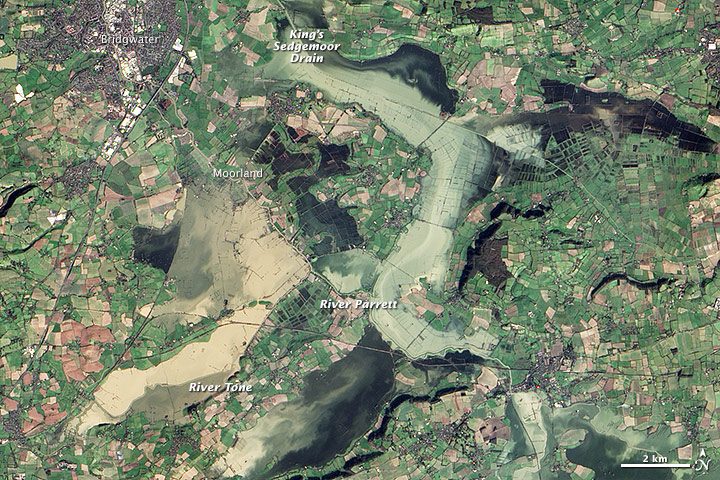
NASA Satellite image of flooding on the Somerset Levels

From December 2013 onwards the Somerset Levels suffered severe flooding as part of the wider 2013–2014 Atlantic winter storms in Europe and subsequent 2013–2014 United Kingdom winter floods. The Somerset Levels, or the Somerset Levels and Moors as they are less commonly but more correctly known, is a coastal plain and wetland area of central Somerset, in South West England, running south from the Mendip Hills to the Blackdown Hills.

The Levels are a low-lying area around 10 to 12 feet (3 to 4 m) above mean sea level (O.D.) which have been prone to flooding from fresh water and occasional salt water inundations. People have attempted to drain the area for hundreds of years. In the Middle Ages, the monasteries of Glastonbury, Athelney, and Muchelney reclaimed and enclosed much of the land. Drains and artificial rivers have been built and pumping stations installed.

During December 2013 and January 2014 heavy rainfall led to extensive flooding with over 600 houses and 17,000 acres (6,900 ha) of agricultural land, including North Moor, Curry and Hay Moors and Greylake, affected. The villages of Thorney and Muchelney were cut off with many houses flooded. Northmoor Green, which is more commonly known as Moorland, was also severely affected. Flood relief activities included the use of rescue boats and the army. High volume pumps were brought in from the Netherlands and installed at several points to try to relieve the flooding.

There were demands for ongoing dredging of the main rivers, although hydrology experts agreed that this would not significantly help the problem of flooding. Prince Charles and several senior politicians visited the area and controversy arose about the role of the Environment Agency. Better farming and development practices, and some drainage works, were recommended to reduce flood risks in the area.

== Geography ==
The Levels occupy an area of about 160,000 acres (650 km^{2}), bisected by the Polden Hills; the areas to the south are drained by the River Parrett, and the areas to the north by the rivers Axe and Brue. The Somerset Levels consist of marine clay "levels" along the coast, and inland (often peat-based) "moors"; agriculturally, about 70 percent is used as grassland and the rest is arable. Willow and teazel are grown commercially and peat is extracted. The Levels are about 20 feet (6 m) above mean sea level (O.D.). The general elevation of water is 10 to 12 feet (3 to 4 m) O.D. The area's topography consists of two basins mainly surrounded by hills, the runoff from which forms rivers that originally meandered across the plain but have now been controlled by embanking and "clyses" (the local name for a sluice).

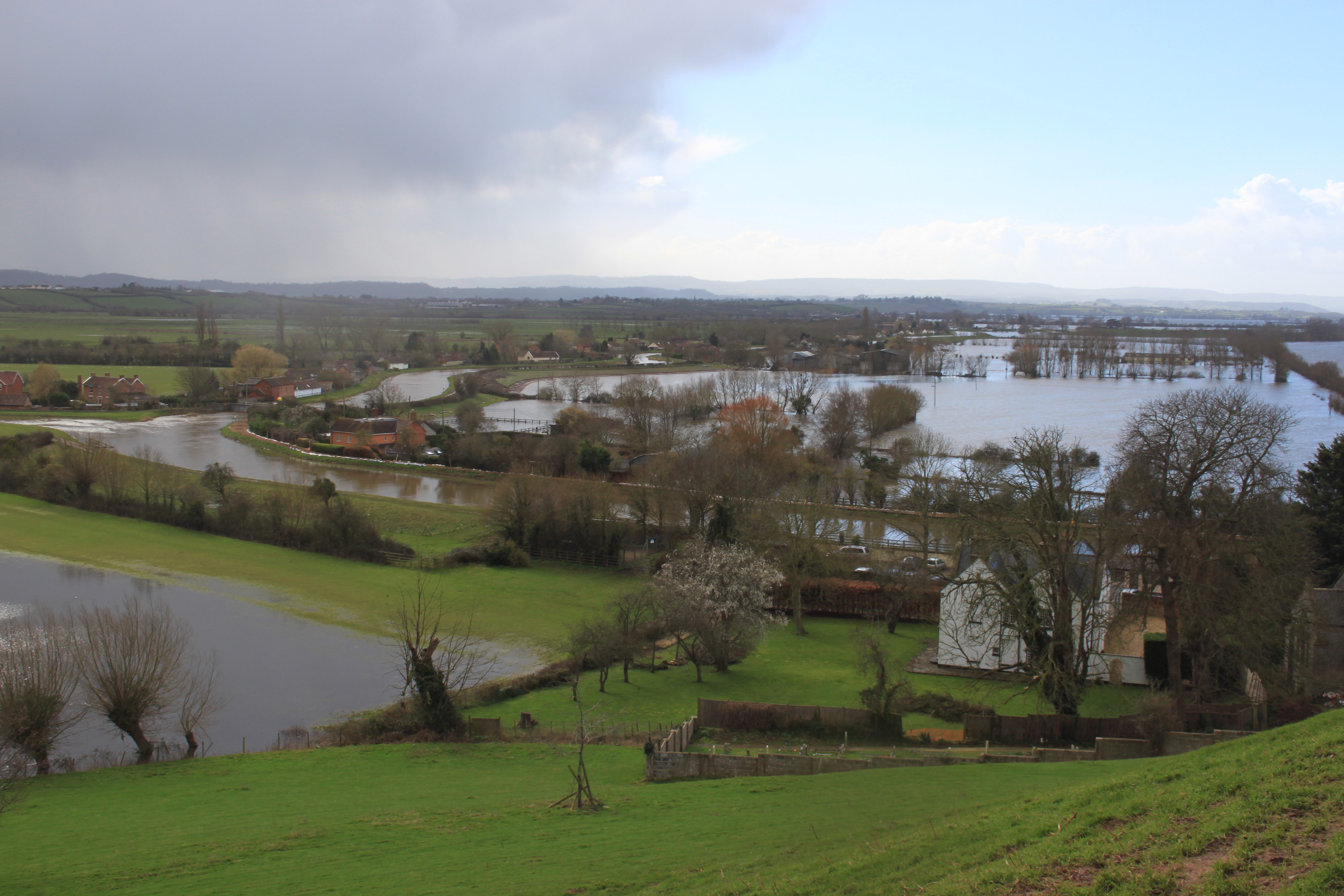
Confluence of the Rivers Parrett and Tone at Burrowbridge during flooding in February 2014

Although underlain by much older Triassic age formations that protrude to form what would once have been islands—such as Athelney, Brent Knoll, Burrow Mump and Glastonbury Tor—the lowland landscape was formed only during the last 10,000 years, following the end of the last ice age. Although sea level changes since the Pliocene led to changes in sea level and the laying down of vegetation, the peak of the peat formation took place in swamp conditions around 6,000 years ago, although in some areas it continued into medieval times.

It is a mainly agricultural region, typically with open fields of permanent grass surrounded by ditches with willow trees. Access to individual areas of the Moors and Levels, especially for cattle, was provided by means of "droves", i.e. green lanes, leading off the public highways. Some of the old roads, in contrast to the old hollow ways found in other areas of England, are causeways raised above the level of the surrounding land, with a drainage ditch running along each side. As a result of the wetland nature of the Moors and Levels, the area contains a rich biodiversity of national and international importance. It supports a great variety of plant and bird species and is an important feeding ground for birds. The Levels and Moors include 32 Sites of Special Scientific Interest, of which 12 are also Special Protection Areas. The area has been extensively studied for its biodiversity and heritage, and has a growing tourism industry.

== High-risk development and high-risk farming practices ==
In 2011, within Sedgemoor District, there were 5,400 properties in significant flood risk areas, 11% of the total. Furthermore, almost 900 of these high-risk properties had been built since 2011, a rate of development nearly three times higher than lower-risk areas of the Levels.

Farming practices have changed in ways that worsen problems with runoff. Around 70% of deep peat in the Somerset Levels and Moors is likely to be losing carbon due to intensive livestock grazing, cultivation and direct extraction. Maize cultivation has increased, and most soils under maize were damaged to the extent that rainfall is unable to penetrate the upper soil layers, resulting in silt-laden runoff.

== History of flood defence ==
The area is prone to winter floods of fresh water and occasional salt water inundations. The worst in recorded history was the Bristol Channel floods of 1607, which resulted in the drowning of an estimated 2,000 or more people in this and other areas; houses and villages swept away; an estimated 200 square miles (51,800 ha) of farmland inundated; and livestock killed. Maximum tidal heights are about a metre higher than 1607, due to a combination of postglacial rebound (0.6m), global sea level rise (0.2m) and other factors including localised peat shrinkage (0.2m). Another severe flood occurred in 1872–1873, when over 107 square miles (27,713 ha) were underwater from October to March.

Early attempts to control the water levels were possibly made by the Romans, but were not widespread. The Domesday Book recorded that drainage of the higher grounds was under way, although the moors at Wedmoor were said to be useless. In the Middle Ages, the monasteries of Glastonbury, Athelney, and Muchelney were responsible for much of the drainage. In 1129, the Abbot of Glastonbury was recorded as inspecting enclosed land at Lympsham. Efforts to control flooding on the Parrett were recorded around the same date. In 1234, 722 acres (292.2 ha) were reclaimed near Westonzoyland and, from the accounts in the abbey's rent books, this had increased to 972 acres (393 ha) by 1240.

=== Drains ===
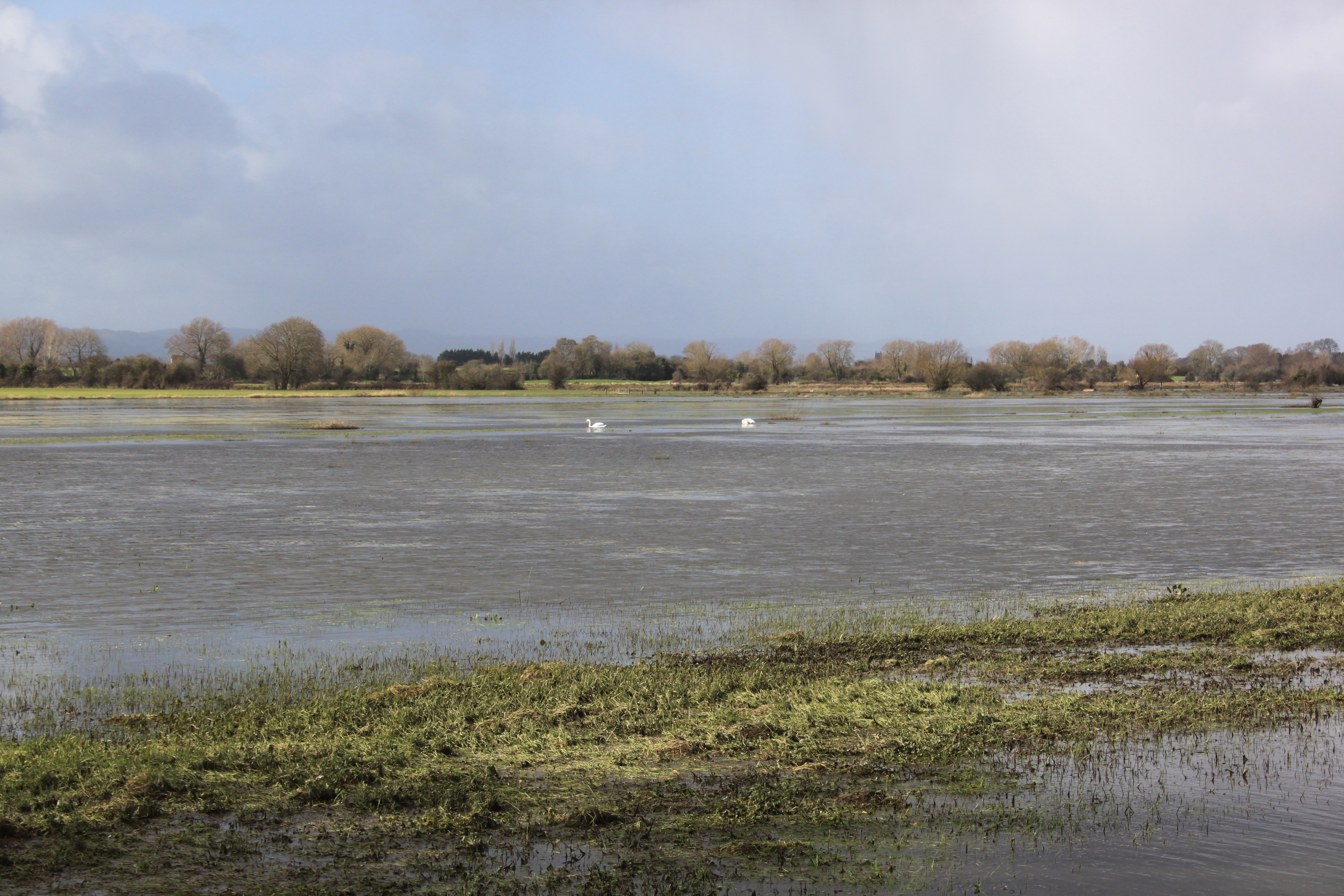
Greylake next to King's Sedgemoor Drain showing extensive flooding on 26 February 2014

Flooding of adjacent moor land was partially addressed during the 13th century by the construction of a number of embankment walls to contain the Parrett. They included Southlake Wall, Burrow Wall, and Lake Wall. The River Tone was also diverted by the Abbot of Athelney and other land owners into a new embanked channel, joining the River Parrett upstream from its original confluence. The main drainage outlets flowing through the Moors and Levels are the rivers Axe, Brue, Huntspill, Parrett, Tone, and Yeo, together with the King's Sedgemoor Drain, an artificial channel into which the River Cary now runs. Previously, the Cary ran into the Tone while the Brue ran through Meare Pool (now drained) and the Panborough Gap, and then into the Axe. Another accomplishment in the Middle Ages was the construction of the tidal Pillrow Cut, joining the Brue and Axe. In 1500, there was said to be 70,000 acres (283 km^{2}) of floodable land of which only 20,000 acres (81 km^{2}) had been reclaimed. In 1597, 50 acres (20 ha) of land were recovered near the Parrett estuary; a few years later, 140 acres (57 ha) near Pawlett were recovered by means of embankments; and three further reclamations, totaling 110 acres (45 ha), had been undertaken downstream of Bridgwater by 1660.

In the early 17th century, during the time of King James I, abortive plans were made to drain and enclose much of Sedgemoor, which the local Lords supported but opposed by the Commoners who would have lost grazing rights. In 1632, Charles I sold the Crown's interest in the scheme, and it was taken over by a consortium that included Sir Cornelius Vermuyden, a Dutch drainage engineer. However, the work was delayed by the English Civil War and later defeated in parliament after local opposition. In 1638, it was reported that nearly 2,600 acres (11 km^{2}) of Tealham and Tadham Moors were not reclaimed, with a total of 30,500 acres (123.43 km^{2}) being undrained. Between 1785 and 1791, much of the lowest part of the peat moors was enclosed. In 1795, John Billingsley advocated enclosure and the digging of rhynes (a local name for drainage channels, pronounced "reens" in the east and rhyne to the west) between plots, and wrote in his Agriculture of the County of Somerset that 4,400 acres (18 km^{2}) had been enclosed in the last 20 years in Wedmore and Meare, 350 acres (1.4 km^{2}) at Nyland, 900 acres (3.64 km^{2}) at Blackford, 2,000 acres (8 km^{2}) at Mark, 100 acres (0.4 km^{2}) in Shapwick, and 1,700 acres (7 km^{2}) at Westhay. At Westhay Moor in the early 19th century, it was shown how peat bogs could be successfully drained and top-dressed with silt deposited via flooding, creating a very rich soil. The character of the soil was also changed by the spreading of clay and silt from the digging of King's Sedgemoor Drain.

The man-made Huntspill River was constructed during World War II with sluices at both ends to provide a guaranteed daily supply of 4,500,000 imperial gallons (20,000,000 L; 5,400,000 US gal) of "process water". It was intended that in the summer, when water supply was lower, it would serve as a reservoir with water pumped from the moors; and in winter serve as a drainage channel, via gravity drainage. Geotechnical problems prevented it from being dug as deep as originally intended and so gravity-drainage of the moors was not possible: thus, water is pumped up into the river throughout the year. The Sowy River between the River Parrett and King's Sedgemoor Drain was completed in 1972. The Levels and Moors are now artificially drained by a network of rhynes which are pumped up into "drains". Water levels are managed by the Levels internal drainage boards (IDBs); the Levels are not as intensively drained or farmed as the East Anglian fens, historically a similar area of low marsh. One of the approaches to reducing the risk of flooding within the catchment area of the Parrett is the planting of new woodlands.

Since 1990, the drainage boards have been charged with watching the rhynes and keeping them clear, under the overall responsibility of the Environment Agency. Although the Environment Agency have made plans for the regular winter flooding, still in recent years this has resulted in a number of villages — including Langport, Muchelney and Westonzoyland — being cut off. In November 2012, during the 2012 Great Britain and Ireland floods, after six days Somerset County Council-funded BARB rescue boats reached Muchelney on 29 November, rescuing nearly 100 people.

Controversy about the management of the drainage and flood protection has previously involved the activities of IDBs. However, IDBs have been actively participating with the Parrett Catchment Partnership, a partnership of 30 organisations that aims to create a consensus on how water is to be managed, in particular, looking at new ways to achieve sustainable benefits for all local stakeholders.

During 2009 and 2010, work was undertaken to upgrade sluice gates, watercourses, and culverts to enable seasonal flooding of Southlake Moor during the winter diverting water from the Sowy River onto the moor. It has the capacity to hold 1.2 million cubic metres (42×10^{6} cu ft) as part of a scheme by the Parrett Internal Drainage Board to restore ten floodplains in Somerset. In spring, the water is drained away to enable the land to be used as pasture during the summer. The scheme is also used to encourage water birds.

The Environment Agency's current "Parrett Catchment Flood Management Plan", published in December 2009, divides the Parrett catchment area into eight sub-areas, with the Somerset Levels and Moors falling into sub-area 6 and Bridgwater falling into sub-area 7. As part of the published flood risk assessments for both these sub-areas, it is recognised that: at a future date a tidal clyse may be needed on the Parrett; this causes a funding dilemma; and, geomorphology studies of the Parrett and the Tone are needed to help address many of the uncertainties associated with a tidal exclusion project.

=== Pumps ===
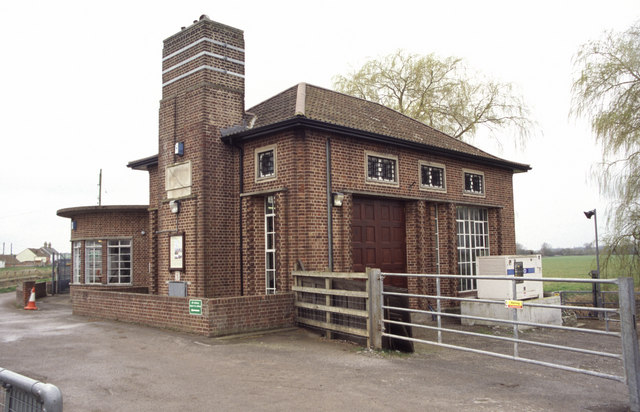
Curry Moor pumping station

Little attempt was made during the 17th and 18th centuries to pump water, possibly because the coal-driven Newcomen steam engines would have been uneconomical. It is not clear why windmills were not employed, as they were on the Fens of East Anglia, but only two examples have been recorded on the Levels: one at Bleadon at the mouth of the River Axe, where a sea wall had been built, and the other at Common Moor north of Glastonbury, which was being drained following a private act of Parliament in 1721, the Glastonbury Inclosure Act 1721 (8 Geo. 1. c. 16 Pr.). The first steam pumping station was Westonzoyland Pumping Station in 1830, followed by more effective ones from 1860. Automatic electric pumps are used today.

== Rainfall ==
Along with the rest of South West England the Somerset Levels have a temperate climate, which is generally wetter and milder than the rest of the country. The annual mean temperature is approximately 10 °C (50.0 °F). Seasonal temperature variation is less extreme than most of the United Kingdom because of the adjacent sea. The summer months of July and August are the warmest, with mean daily maxima of approximately 21 °C (69.8 °F). In winter, mean minimum temperatures of 1 or 2 °C (33.8 or 35.6 °F) are common. The Azores high pressure area influences the south-west of England's summer weather, but convective cloud sometimes forms inland, reducing the number of hours of sunshine. Annual sunshine rates are slightly less than the regional average of 1,600 hours. In December 1998, there were 20 days without sun recorded at Yeovilton. Most rainfall in the south-west is caused by convection or Atlantic depressions, which are most active in autumn and winter, when they are the chief cause of rain. In summer, a large proportion of the rainfall is caused by the Sun heating the land, leading to convection and to showers and thunderstorms. Average rainfall is around 700 mm (28 in), and about 8–15 days of snowfall is typical. November to March have the highest mean wind speeds, while June to August have the lightest winds. The predominant wind direction is from the southwest.

During December 2013, several deep areas of low pressure moved across or to the north of the British Isles, bringing high wind speeds and heavy rain to many locations. This weather was connected to major perturbations to the Pacific and North Atlantic jet streams, which was partially caused by persistent rainfall over Indonesia and the tropical Pacific Ocean. The Northern Atlantic jet stream was also unusually strong, which was linked to an unusually strong westerly phase of the stratospheric Quasi-biennial oscillation which drove a very deep polar vortex and strong polar night jet.

The first major area of low pressure moved across the British Isles between 5–6 December and was followed by another system on 18–19 December, while a system moved to the north of the UK during 23–24 December. This made December 2013 one of the stormiest Decembers on record, and one of the windiest months since January 1993. Figures released by the Met Office on 30 January indicated that Southern England and parts of the Midlands had experienced their highest January rainfall since records began in 1910.

== Effects ==
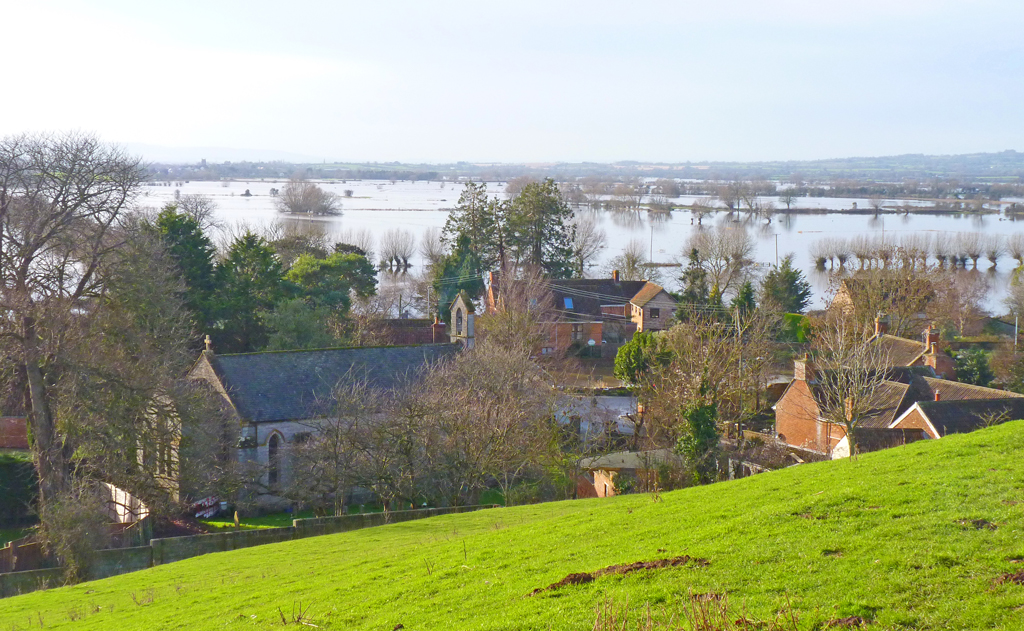
The view from Burrow Mump above Burrowbridge showing the closed A361 road

The River Parrett overflowed at new year, during the rain and storms from Storm Dirk, with many residents asking for the Environment Agency to resume river dredging. On 24 January 2014, in light of the continued flooded extent of the Somerset Moors and forecast new rainfall as part of the Winter storms of 2013–2014 in the United Kingdom, both Somerset County Council and Sedgemoor District Council declared a major incident, as defined under the Civil Contingencies Act 2004. At this time, with 17,000 acres (6,900 ha) of agricultural land having been under water for over a month, the village of Thorney had been abandoned and Muchelney had been cut off by flood waters for almost a month. Northmoor Green, which is more commonly known as Moorland, was also severely affected.

By the end of January, 17,000 acres (6,900 ha) of agricultural land, including North Moor, Curry and Hay Moors and Greylake, had been under water for over a month. Bridgwater was partly flooded on 10 February 2014, when 20,000 sandbags were ready to be deployed. In total 165 properties on the Somerset Levels suffered internal flooding. Both flooding and groundwater had also disrupted services including trains on the Bristol to Exeter line between Bridgwater and Taunton.

== Flood relief ==
The Ministry of Defence sent Royal Marines from 40 Commando (based at Norton Manor Camp near Taunton) to the Somerset Levels to help with flood protection. The Government also provided an extra £30 million for repairs. A small unit of Mounted Police patrolled parts of the Somerset Levels after reports of items, including heating oil and quad bikes being stolen from the homes of flood victims on 3 February.

An earth bank at Huntworth was hastily built, connecting the canal bank to the railway embankment and the embankment to the river wall. This was to prevent any flooding from reaching the outskirts of Bridgwater. Some of the Dutch pumps were located behind it at Newhouse Farm to pump any water away.

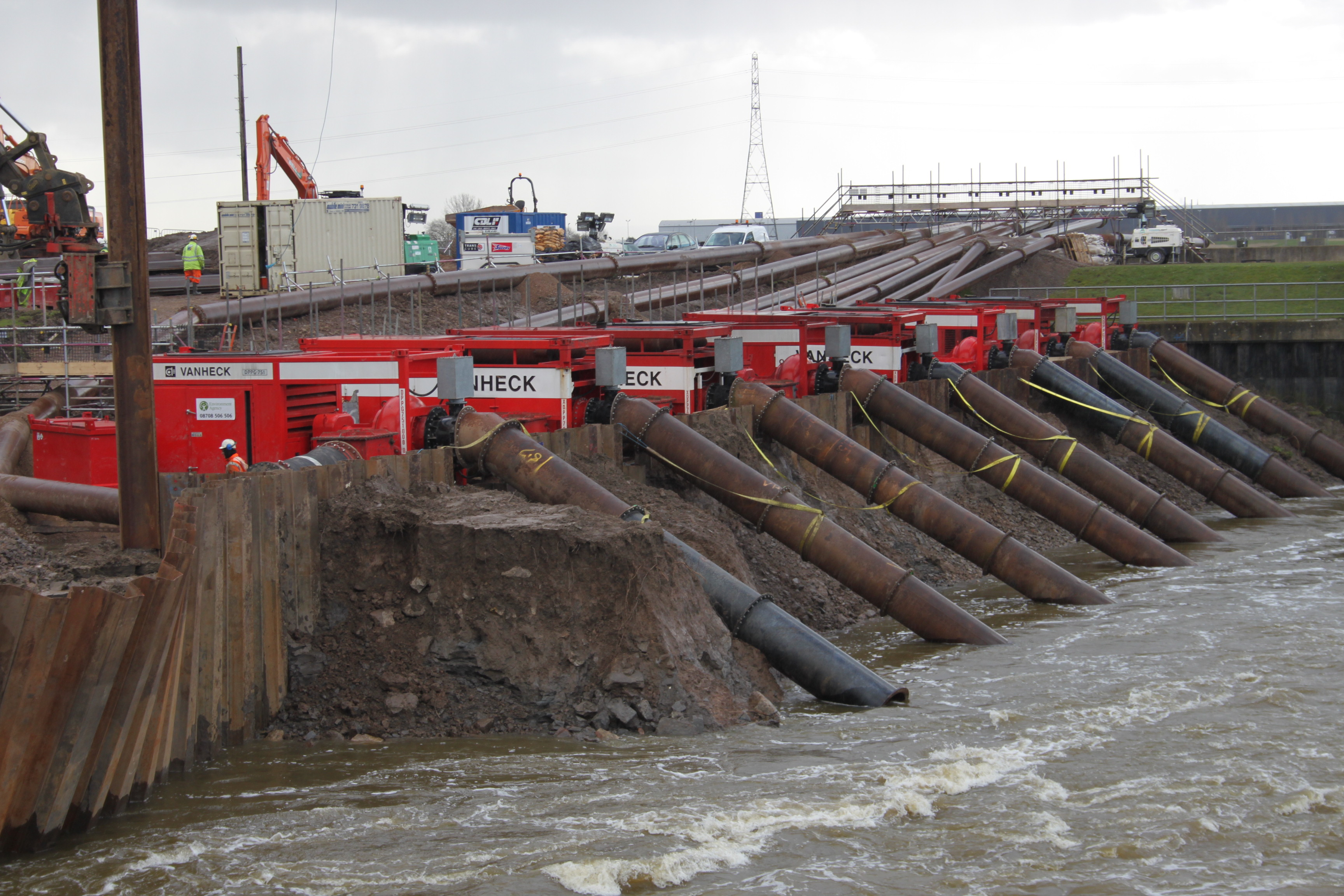
8 high-output Dutch pumps removing floodwater at Dunball

In the middle of February 2014, the Environment Agency began installing giant pumps imported from the Netherlands to alleviate the continuing flooding. A Dutch team of engineers had arrived in at a sluice at Bridgwater with more than 20 lorries full of kit and pumps to help with the flood relief effort in Somerset on 12 February. By 21 February 8 high-output pumps located at Dunball were starting to lower the level in King's Sedgemoor Drain allowing floodwater-from the upper Parrett to reach it by way of the Sowy River. The water is pumped into the tidal river Parrett for several hours on either side of a high tide. At low tide the water drains through the sluice gates at Dunball by gravity. The Monks Leaze Clyse, near Langport was gradually opened on Saturday 22 February, allowing the operation to start. The pumps at Dunball drew water out of the King's Sedgemoor Drain into the River Parrett at a rate of 56,000 m3 every hour.

There has been enormous local support for those affected by the floods, co-ordinated by FLAG — the Flooding on the Levels Action Group. As well as having volunteers in the villages, they are organising fund-raising, and the collection of supplies to help those who have suffered. They make extensive use of social media - Facebook and Twitter to communicate news.

The Environment Agency's south west office had reported that a temporary flood barrier in Bridgwater, Somerset has been vandalised by unknown assailants.

== Dredging - public, experts, and political responses ==
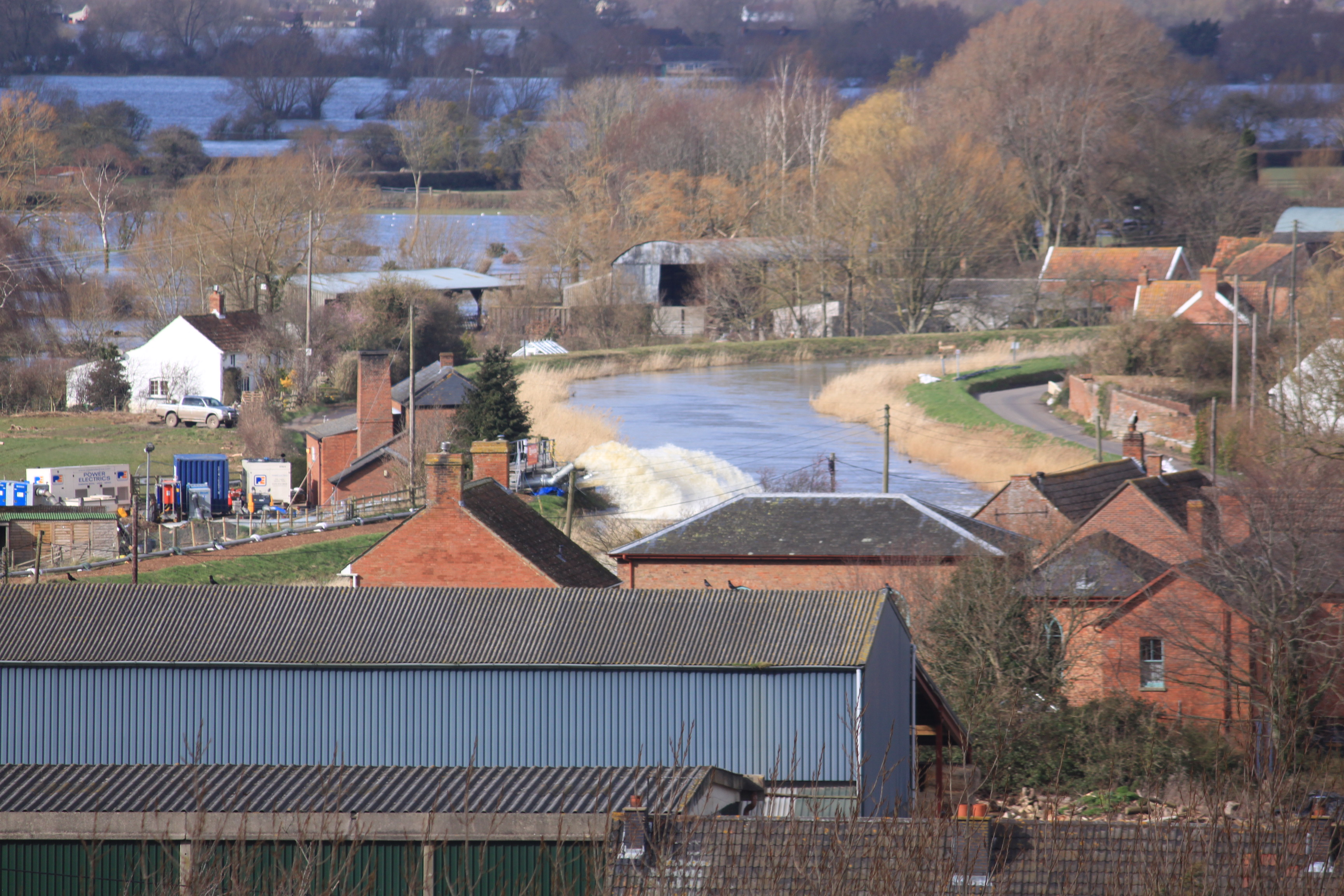
Northmoor pumping station with extra pumps installed to pump water into the River Parrett. 26 February 2014

=== Hydrology ===
There were public calls for the rivers Parrett and Tone, in particular, to be dredged. The Environment Agency was blamed for having failed to dredge the major river channels of the Levels. It was said that as a consequence, rivers silt up and have reduced capacity to carry flooding waters when rainfall is heavier than average. The Environment Agency and others pointed out that it would be more effective to spend money on delaying floodwaters upstream, and that increasing the capacity of rivers by dredging would be of no significant use. Senior hydrologists made clear that dredging does not offer a useful solution to flooding on the Somerset Levels.

=== Political responses ===
There was criticism of the head of the Environment Agency by Bridgwater and West Somerset MP Ian Liddell-Grainger who described Chris Smith, Baron Smith of Finsbury, then head of the Environment Agency, as a "little git", a "coward" and claimed he would "stick his head down the loo and flush". The row focused on the flooding of the Somerset Levels and whether the River Parrett and River Tone should be dredged. Environment Secretary Owen Paterson visited the area on 27 January 2014, and after meeting local MPs, the Environment Agency and various community representatives the night before in Taunton, promised at a media-only press conference at North Moor pumping station that if a local water management plan could be developed over the next six weeks, he would approve it. Such plan would likely include the dredging of the rivers Tone and Parrett, and possibly a later sluice near Bridgwater. There have been public protests about the river Parrett not being dredged in recent years. The expense of ongoing dredging continued to be debated, however the Prime Minister David Cameron confirmed that dredging would resume once it was safe. Jean Venables the chief executive of the Association of Drainage Authorities said engineering measures costing around £60 million, and including a permanent pumping station at Dunball could help to relieve future flooding.

Prince Charles visited the flooded parts of Somerset on 4 February 2014 and told residents it was a "tragedy" nothing had been done for so long. Local volunteers, the Royal National Lifeboat Institution and the firefighters did their best, but required more help from central government. One of the Prince's charities is donating £50,000 to help victims, while the government then announced an extra £300,000 of emergency funding. Some villages on the Somerset Levels had been cut off for more than a month by 4 February 2014. On 6 February Department for Environment, Food and Rural Affairs said that £400,000 had been spent on pumping.

On 7 February, the Environment Secretary handed over the flood management to the Communities Secretary Eric Pickles as he had to undergo an urgent operation to fix a detached retina. The Communities Secretary subsequently appeared on The Andrew Marr Show and apologised "unreservedly" for not dredging the Somerset Levels and said that "the government may have relied too much on the advice" of the Environment Agency. The head of the Environment Agency Lord Chris Smith subsequently responded by openly rejecting the criticism of his organisation and defended it by saying that government budget cuts and "value-for-money" rules imposed by the Treasury were responsible for limiting the Environment Agency's response. The media subsequently reported that the Environment Secretary had protested in the strongest possible terms to the Prime Minister about the Communities Secretary “grandstanding”. On 11 February David Cameron, who had visited the area the previous day, ordered that the political bickering in government should end.

== Future plans ==
Following the invitation of the Environment Secretary in January 2014 for local organisations and residents to develop a management plan to reduce the future incidence of flooding, a report was submitted on 6 March as the floods were subsiding. Its major initiatives were:

- Immediate plans to dredge 8km of the Rivers Parrett and Tone as soon as it is safe and practical to do so;
- Making some temporary flood defences and pumping sites permanent;
- Helping local partners take more responsibility for water management on the Levels through a new Somerset rivers board;
- Supporting farmers to manage flood risk better and
- Ensuring new developments meet the highest standards for water and drainage.

(The plans for the dredging of the Rivers Parrett and Tone had already been announced.) It also proposed improvements to the artificial Sowy River which carries excess water from the River Parrett to the King's Sedgemoor Drain. The plan also proposed the construction of a tidal barrier, similar to but smaller than the Thames Barrier should be built at Bridgwater, and that roads should be raised above the surrounding fields. The temporary pumps at Dunball and Beer Wall would also be replaced with permanent pumping stations. The Committee on Climate Change, following the submission of the plan, emphasised that the new work should take into account increased risks in the future because of climate change.

The estimated cost for the work over the next 20 years was £100 million however only £20 million was pledged by the government.

== Bibliography ==
- Cunliffe, Barry. "The Somerset Levels in the Roman Period" (PDF). Archaeology Data Service (ADS). Archived (PDF) from the original on 9 December 2009.
- Dunning, Robert (1980). Somerset & Avon. Bartholomew. ISBN 0-7028-8380-8.
- Dunning, Robert (2004). "Westonzoyland". A History of the County of Somerset: Volume 8: The Poldens and the Levels. British History Online.
- Galton, Erasmus (1845). "An Account of Improvement of a Shaking Bog at Meare in Somersetshire". Journal of the Royal Agricultural Society of England. 6. Royal Agricultural Society.
- Hardy, Peter (1999). The Geology of Somerset. Ex Libris Press. ISBN 0-948578-42-4.
- Hawkins, Desmond (1982). Avalon and Sedgemoor. Alan Sutton Publishing. ISBN 0-86299-016-5.
- Havinden, Michael (1982). The Somerset Landscape. The making of the English landscape. Hodder and Stoughton. ISBN 0-340-20116-9.
- Hollinrake, Charles; Hollinrake, Nancy (2007). "Chapter 9: The Water Roads of Somerset". In Blair, John (ed.). Waterways and Canal-Building in Medieval England. Oxford University Press. ISBN 978-0-19-921715-1.
- Otter, R. A. (1994). Civil Engineering Heritage: Southern England. Thomas Telford. ISBN 0-7277-1971-8.
- Prudden, Hugh. "Somerset Geology" (PDF). Good Rock Guide. Archived from the original (PDF) on 8 June 2013.
- Storer, Bernard (1985). The Natural History of the Somerset Levels. Dovecote Press. ISBN 978-0-946159-28-4.
- Williams, Michael (1970). The Draining of the Somerset Levels. Cambridge University Press. ISBN 0-521-07486-X.
- Williams, Robin; Williams, Romey (1992). The Somerset Levels. Ex Libris Press. ISBN 0-948578-38-6.
- Wright, Geoffrey N. (1988). Roads and Trackways of Wessex. Moorland Publishing Co. ISBN 0-86190-248-3.
