= Northmoor Green =

Village in Somerset, England

Coordinates: 51.088°N 2.951°W

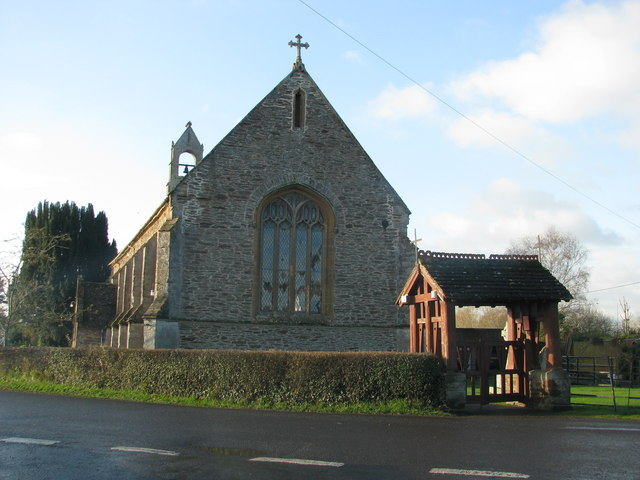
- The Church of St Peter and St John

- Location within Somerset
- OS grid reference: ST335325
- Civil parish: North Petherton
- Unitary authority: Somerset Council
- Ceremonial county: Somerset
- Region: South West
- Country: England
- Sovereign state: United Kingdom
- Post town: BRIDGWATER
- Postcode district: TA7 0
- Dialling code: 01278
- Police: Avon and Somerset
- Fire: Devon and Somerset
- Ambulance: South Western
- UK Parliament: Bridgwater

Northmoor Green, also called Moorland, is a village in North Petherton parish in south central Somerset, England. The village is in the heart of the low-lying Somerset Levels, about 3 miles (5 km) east of North Petherton town.

The River Parrett passes the east end of the village. The village shop, school and post office have closed leaving only the church and village hall. The church of St Peter and St John was built in the 1840s. A pub, The Thatchers Arms is about a mile to the north-west.

The village hall was built to celebrate the coronation of Elizabeth II. Work was begun by the villagers, but had to be pulled down and rebuilt by professional builders, as the walls were not straight. Dances used to be held in it once a month, with refreshments provided by the local Women's Institutes.

Before the hall was built, a small amateur dramatic society, The Parrett Players, produced two one-act plays which were held in the local school.

The village gained nationwide recognition in February 2014 due to extensive flooding on the Somerset Levels which particularly affected Moorland, when the Environment Agency constructed an earth bank to try to hold back the water.

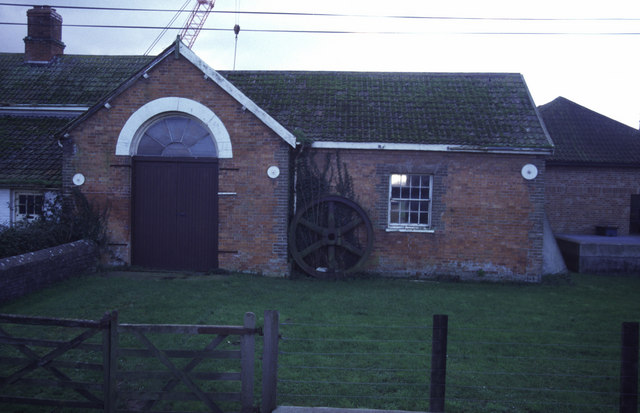
Northmoor Pumping Station

Moorland Court Farmhouse was built in the early 19th century. It is a Grade II listed building. Winslade Farmhouse which is also listed dates from the 17th century, as does Moorland Cottage.

North Moor to the south of the village is a 676.3 hectare biological Site of Special Scientific Interest. The low-lying area is drained by a series of ditches and the Northmoor Pumping Station.

Serious flooding occurred during the winter of 2013–14. The Church of St Peter and St John was closed for two years following the flooding and reopened in January 2016. Severe flooding occurred again in January 2026 following Storm Chandra.
