= 2013–2014 Atlantic winter storms in Europe =

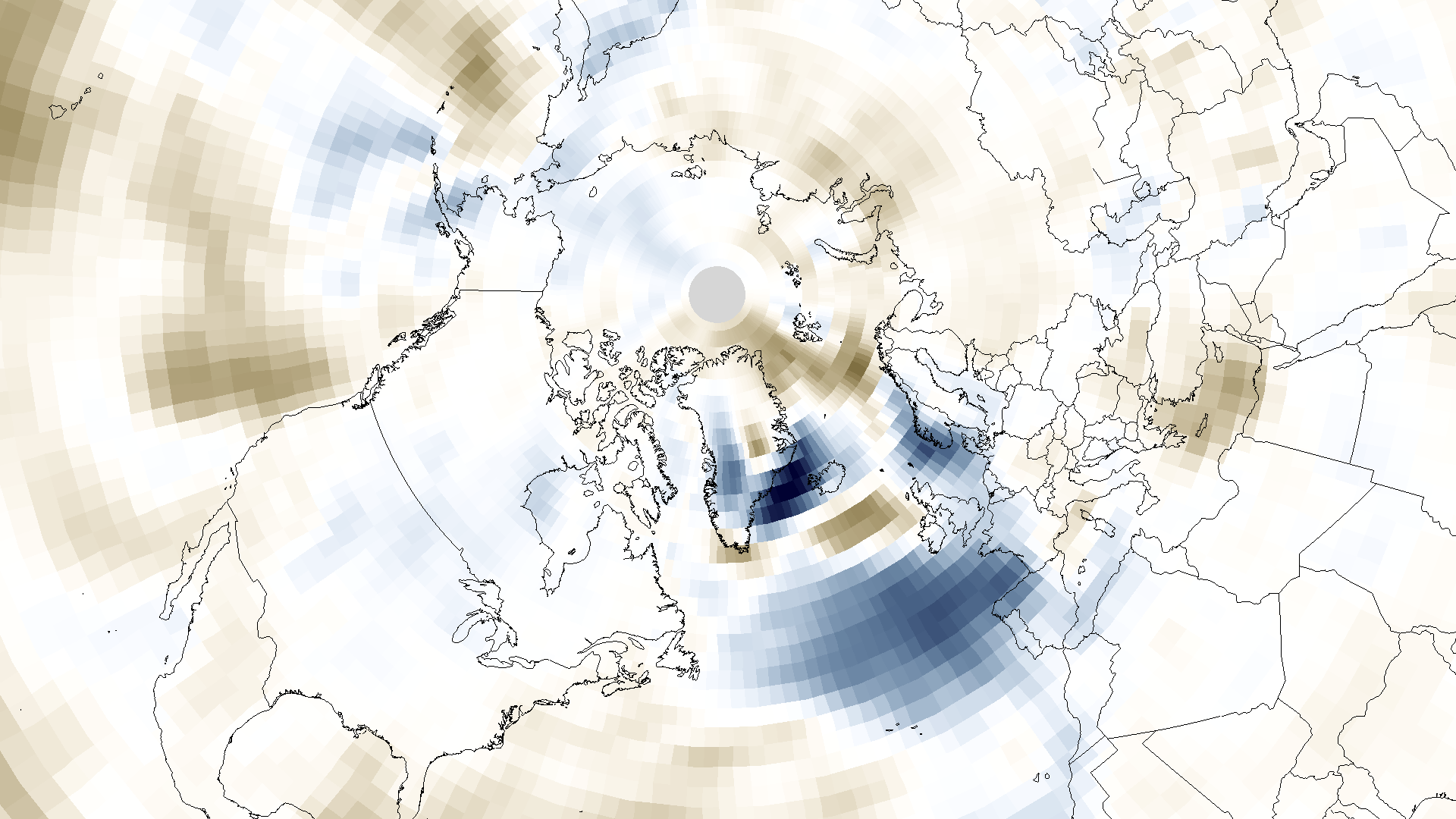
- NOAA North Atlantic wind speed anomaly January–February 2014

Extratropical cyclones

2013–2014 Atlantic winter storms in Europe
- ^{1}Strongest storm is determined by lowest pressure and maximum recorded non-mountainous wind gust is also included for reference.

2013–2014 Atlantic winter storms in Europe were a series of winter storms affecting areas of Atlantic Europe and beyond. The French Atlantic coastal regions (chiefly Brittany), South West and Southern England, West Wales, Ireland, Spanish Atlantic coastal regions (particularly Galicia) were especially affected by a "conveyor belt" series of high-precipitation storms (mostly not exceptional for their winds) and by high tides. Many storms were explosively deepened by a strong jet stream, many deepening below 950 hPa. The repeated formation of large deep lows over the Atlantic brought storm surges and large waves which coincided with some of the highest astronomical tides of the year and caused coastal damage. The low pressure areas brought heavy rainfalls which led to flooding, which became most severe over parts of England such as at the Somerset Levels. The repeated storms fit into a pattern of disturbed weather in the Northern Hemisphere, which saw from November 2013 a disturbance to the jet stream in the western Pacific, which propagated eastwards bringing a warm winter to Alaska, drought to California, and repeated cold air outbreaks to the eastern USA where the early 2014 North American cold wave resulted.

== Autumn 2013 ==
The end of October brought the St. Jude storm, ranked within the top 10 most severe storms in the autumn across southern England in the last 40 years. following the St. Jude storm a series of low pressure systems swept across western Europe bringing winds and rain, though not developing anywhere near as deeply as the St. Jude storm. A low named Godehard^{[Note 1]} was the strongest of these low pressure areas and brought some disruption to Wales, with a gust of 89 mph (143 km/h) recorded at Mumbles. Storm-force winds left 10,000 homes without electricity in Wales on the first weekend of November 2013. On 2 November the M4 Motorway was closed between Margam and Pyle due to the weather, and a roof canopy at the Princess of Wales Hospital Bridgend was damaged. The old Severn Bridge on the M48 motorway was closed, with speed restrictions in place on the Second Severn Crossing. The M4 at Briton Ferry – where the motorway crosses the Neath – also saw speed restrictions and the Britannia Bridge to Anglesey and the Cleddau Bridge in Pembrokeshire also saw speed restrictions enacted. Natural Resources Wales warned of localised flooding with sea spray and overtopping of sea defences along the Pembrokeshire, Ceredigion and Newport coasts. The low pressure also brought large waves to Aberystwyth which caused some disruption to seafront properties.

== November/December 2013 ==
Late November and early December saw an area of high pressure positioned to the west of Britain and Ireland, this directed the westerly path of weather systems moving over the Atlantic to the north of the UK, along which the storms developed before impacting across the Nordic countries. Lows moving to the north of the United Kingdom meant that November was fairly dry for the country. December saw long periods of calm conditions in France also with dry and sunny weather predominating. A change in the weather regime began as active depressions brought strong rain and snowfall to the mountains towards the month end. Until 13 December, France (and UK and Ireland) were protected by a powerful anticyclone stretched from the Maghreb to the British Isles, which deflected the Atlantic storm track north into Scandinavia. The Nordic nations were affected by a series of storms, including Hilde (17 November), Oskari (1 dec), Xaver (5–7 Dec), Ivar (12 Dec) and Zaki and Adam (14–15 Dec). Cyclone Xaver is predominantly known for the North sea storm surge of 5 December in the UK. The high pressure over Britain, Ireland and the Atlantic moved east during mid December, opening the way for areas of low pressure to reach western Europe. During mid-December a strong temperature gradient established over eastern North America (temperatures in New York 21 °C [70 °F], Montreal −7 °C [19 °F]), which enhanced the jetstream in the North Atlantic. The lows moved under this powerful jet stream where they explosively deepened before reaching Western Europe.

== Christmas and New Year storms ==
=== Bernd (18–19 December) ===
Bernd
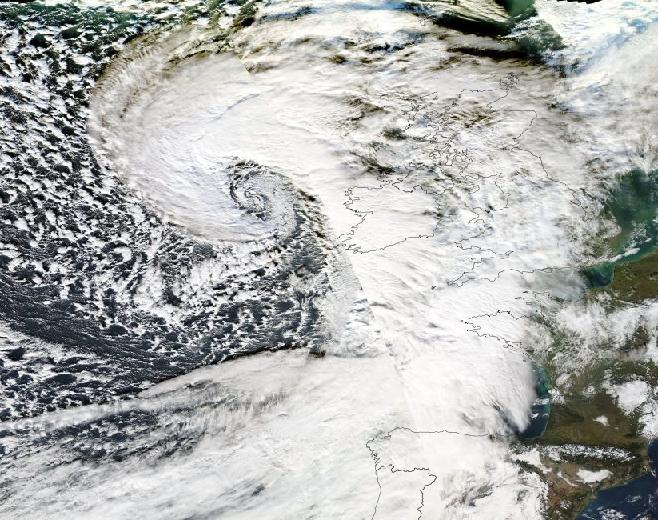

Meteorological history
- Formed: 17 December 2013
- Dissipated: 21 December 2013

Meteorological information
- Lowest pressure: 947 hPa (28.0 inHg)

The first storm of this period was named Bernd,^{[Note 1]} it was also given the name Emily by some press, after Emily Brontë the author, who died on 19 December 165 years ago, and who wrote Wuthering Heights which featured constant stormy weather. Met Éireann issued red warnings for wind at 9:00am on 18 December for counties Donegal, Galway, Leitrim, Mayo and Sligo. The UK Met Office issued orange warnings for the Highlands, Western Isles, Strathclyde and Northern Ireland.

UK Met Office maximum hourly gust speed 18 Dec 18:00 – 19 Dec 07:00.
Site	Area	Elevation (m)	Max gust speed (mph)	Max gust speed (km/h)
Needles Old Battery	Isle of Wight	80	94	151
South Uist Range	Western Isles	4	90	140
Tiree	Argyll	9	87	140
Plymouth, Mountbatten	Devon	50	85	137
Castlederg	Tyrone	49	84	135
Pembrey Sands	Dyfed	3	82	132
Capel Curig	Gwynedd	216	81	130
Stornoway Airport	Western Isles	15	77	124
Altnaharra	Sutherland	81	77	124
Fair Isle	Shetland	57	76	122

UK Met Office 24 Hour Rainfall Totals 18 Dec 07:00 – 19 Dec 07:00, 2013.
Site	Area	Precipitation (mm)
Tredegar	Gwent	38.4
Cardinham, Bodmin	Cornwall	35
Whitechurch	Dyfed	34.4
Tyndrum	Perthshire	32.2
Libanus	Powys	30.8
Shap	Cumbria	30.6
Okehampton	Devon	30.6
Keswick	Cumbria	28.8
Tulloch Bridge	Inverness-shire	27
Bala	Gwynedd	26.4

=== Dirk (23–24 December) ===
Dirk
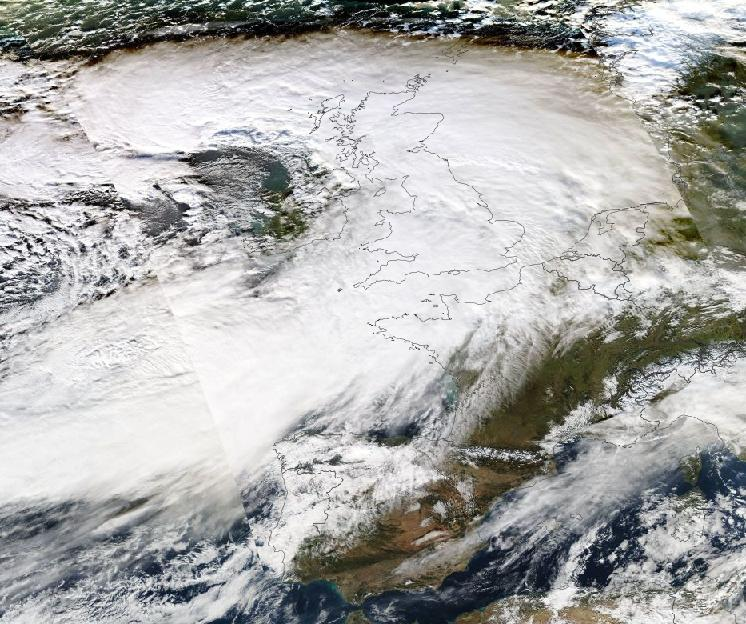

Meteorological history
- Formed: 21 December 2013
- Dissipated: 28 December 2013

Meteorological information
- Lowest pressure: 927 hPa (27.4 inHg)

Dirk formed over North America, some storminess was associated with the low in Canada, before it moved into the Atlantic. The preceding weather in North America saw a steep temperature gradient (temperatures in New York 21 °C [70 °F], Montreal −7 °C [19 °F]) which enhanced the jetstream in the North Atlantic. The low moved under this powerful jet stream where it explosively deepened before reaching Western Europe.

Deepening below 935 hPa (27.6 inHg) is considered uncommon in the North Atlantic, but has been recorded on a number of occasions, measured from ships transiting the ocean and from land based-recording stations. Offshore the minimum low pressure of the "Dirk" storm was forecast to reach a low of 927 hPa (27.4 inHg).

On land the low pressure during the storm was measured at 936.8 hPa (27.66 inHg) on 24 December at Stornoway, Isle of Lewis off the north west coast of Scotland. This the lowest measured in Britain and Ireland since 1886 (127 years), when a low of 931.2 hPa (27.50 inHg) was recorded in Belfast, Northern Ireland. The most recent low pressure record near such values in Stornoway was measured on 20 December 1982 at 937.6 hPa (27.69 inHg). The all-time low pressure record for the British Isles remains at 925.4 hPa (27.33 inHg), recorded at Ochtertyre, Crieff in Perthshire on 26 January 1884.

At the southernmost tip of the Faroe Islands a low air pressure of 932.2 hPa was recorded on Christmas Eve at Akraberg lighthouse. This was not as low as the Faroese record of 930.3 hPa (27.47 inHg), set at Vagar airport during the passage of the Braer Storm of January 1993.

=== Erich (26–27 December) ===
Erich
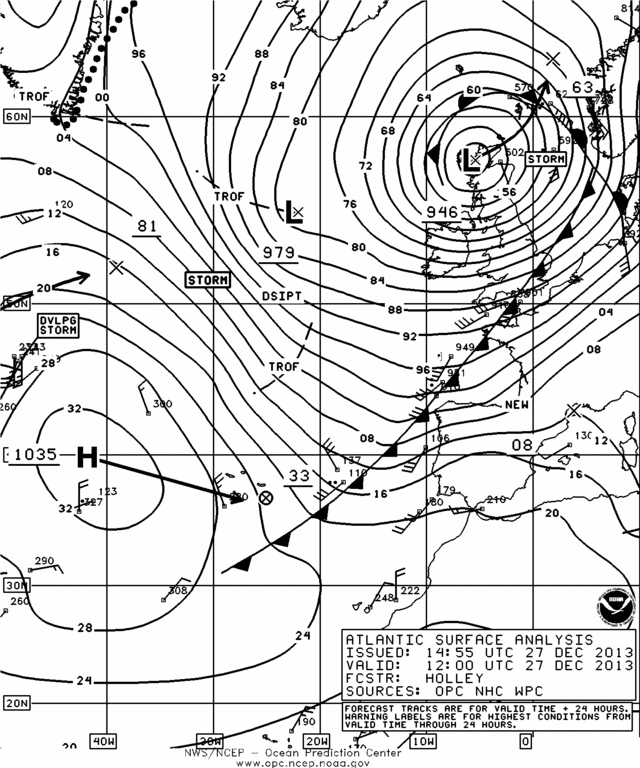

Meteorological history
- Formed: 25 December 2013
- Dissipated: 1 January 2014

Meteorological information
- Lowest pressure: 944 hPa (27.9 inHg)

UK Met Office maximum hourly gust speed 00:00 27 December to 14:30 27 December.
Site	Area	Elevation (m)	Max gust speed (mph)	Max gust speed (km/h)
Aberdaron	Gwynedd	95	102	164
Capel Curig	Gwynedd	216	87	140
Mumbles Head	West Glamorgan	43	85	137
St Bees Head	Cumbria	124	85	137
Inverbervie	Kincardineshire	134	81	130
Valley	Gwynedd	10	81	130
Lake Vyrnwy	Powys	360	78	126
Mona	Anglesey	60	78	126
Needles Old Battery	Isle of Wight	80	78	126
Dundrennan	Kirkcudbrightshire	113	77	124
Pembrey Sands	Dyfed	3	76	122

UK Met Office 24 Hour Rainfall Totals 00:00 27 December to 14:30 27 December.
Site	Area	Precipitation (mm)
Tulloch Bridge	Inverness-shire	38
Tyndrum	Perthshire	37.8
Charterhouse	Roxburghshire	37.8
*Kielder Castle	Northumberland	33.2
Achnagart	Ross & Cromarty	32.8
Redesdale Camp	Northumberland	28.6

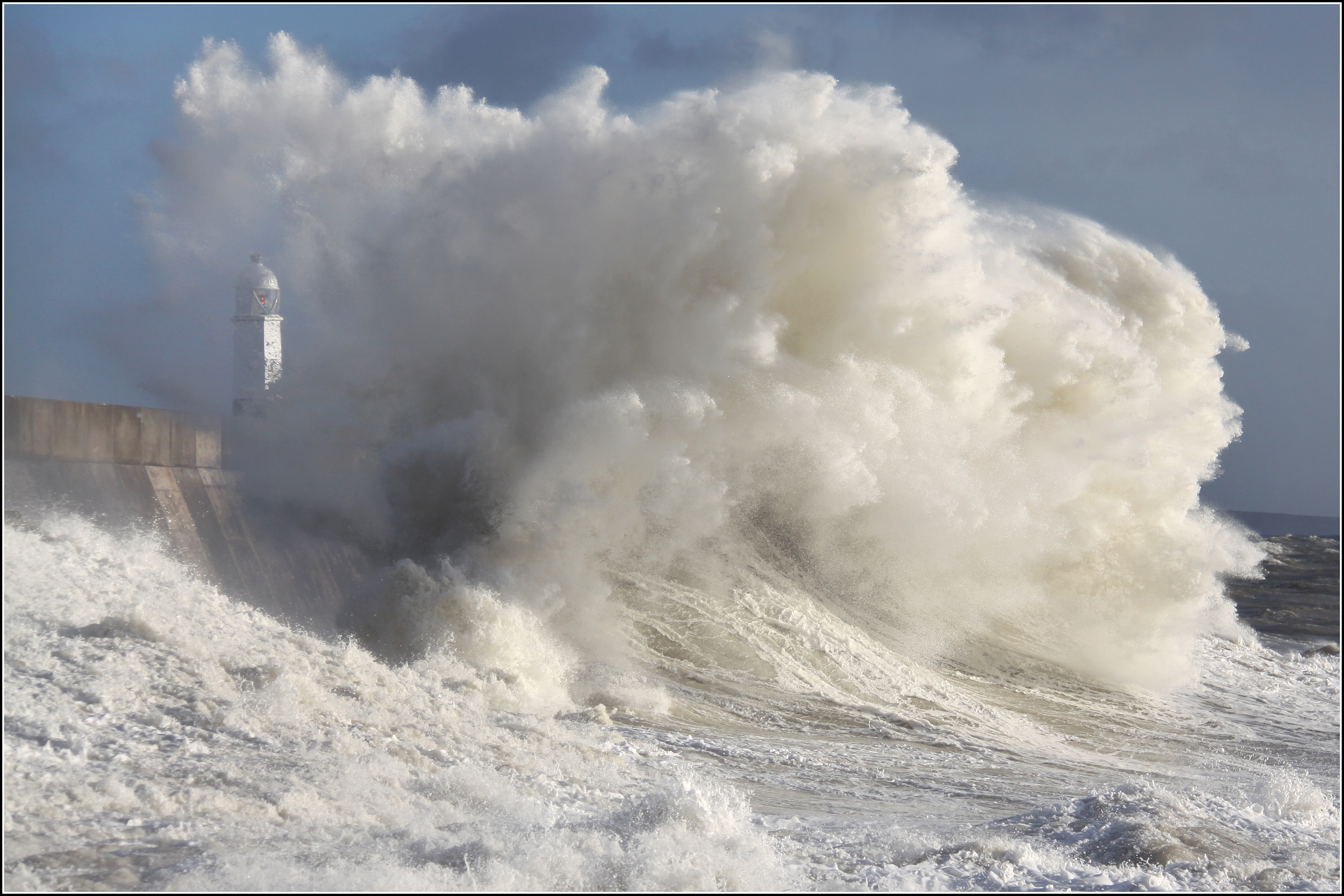
High waves at Porthcawl 27 December

=== Felix & Gerhard ===
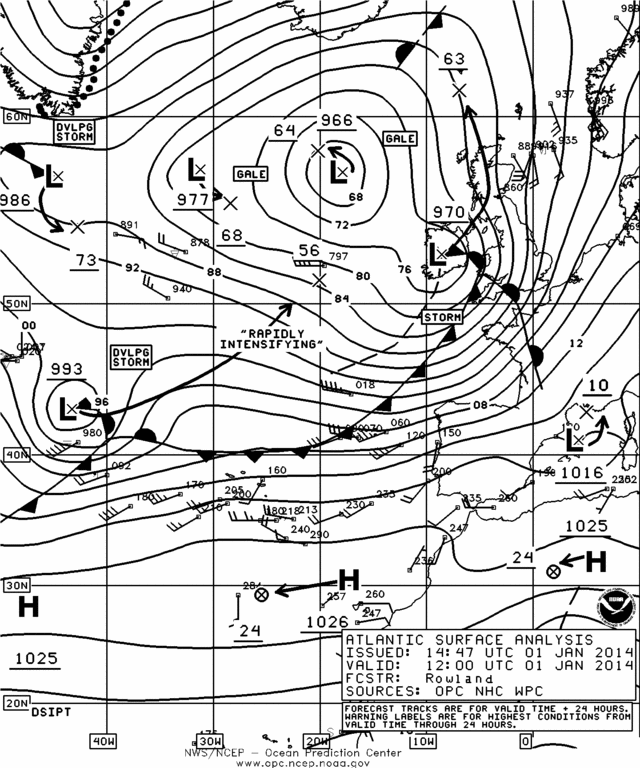
Lows Felix II 966 hPa, Gerhard 970 hPa and Anne 993 hPa, on 1 January 2014

A stormy period between Christmas and New Year followed as Weather fronts associated with the lows Felix (30 December) and Gerhard (1 January) passed over the UK which brought further rainfall and some stormy conditions.

The Felix low was more remote from European mainland and brought strong tightening of isobars across NW France, where winds of 141 km/h (88 mph) were reported in Camaret-sur-Mer, Brittany. Low near Iceland brought winds up to 140 km/h (87 mph) to that country, and disrupted traffic and heavy rainfall and brought more flooding to the United Kingdom. At Croyde Bay in north Devon a woman was rescued from sea who later died on 31 December.

27-year-old man swept out to sea on Loe Bar Porthleven Cornwall New Year's Eve, and on 1 January a man was found dead on the banks of River Torridge in Bideford, Devon. Over the holiday period, several New Year outdoor swimming events were cancelled.

== Notes ==
1. Naming conventions (where possible) follow those adopted by the Free University of Berlin's adopt a vortex scheme. Names from other sources referenced in article.
