= Greylake =

Geological site near Middlezoy, Somerset

- Site of Special Scientific Interest
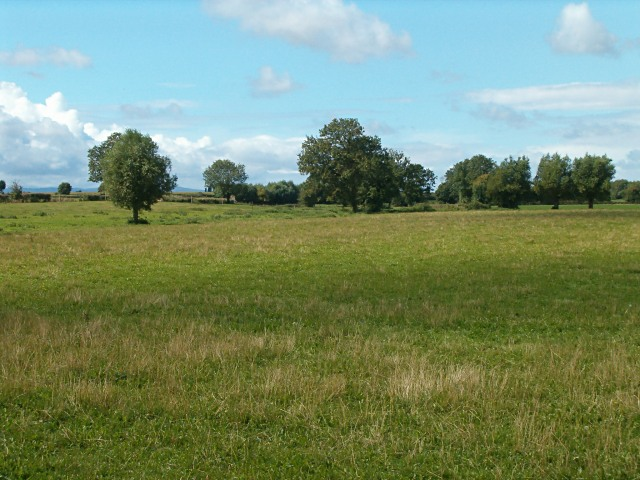

- Location within Somerset
- Location of Greylake.
- Area of search: Somerset
- Grid reference: ST384336
- Coordinates: 51.098°N 2.881°W
- Interest: Geological
- Area: 9.3 hectares (0.093 km^{2}; 0.036 sq mi)
- Notification date: 1987

Greylake is a hamlet in Middlezoy parish in Somerset, England. It lies on the A361 road about a mile northeast of Middlezoy village, and 5.5 miles (9 km) south-east of the town of Bridgwater. It gives its name to a Site of Special Scientific Interest which lies north of the hamlet.

== SSSI ==
Greylake (grid reference ST384336) is a 9.1-hectare (22-acre) geological Site of Special Scientific Interest, notified in 1987.

This site, on the Somerset Levels, consists of 20 low-lying fields in the north west corner of King's Sedgemoor. It includes the Royal Society for the Protection of Birds' Greylake nature reserve which has taken over arable farmland and is now home to northern lapwings, common snipe, Eurasian curlews, redshanks, yellow wagtails, skylarks, and meadow pipits.

This location is the type section for the Pleistocene Burtle Beds, as it is probably the most complete Burtle Beds sequence in Somerset. It demonstrates a sequence of fluvial (or possibly glacial) gravels, marine intertidal silts and marine subtidal. Rich molluscan, ostracod, and foraminifera assemblages and a mammalian fauna, including red deer (Cervus elephus), aurochs (Bos primigenius), and fallow deer (Dama dama) have been recorded.

Greylake was flooded during the winter flooding of 2013–14 on the Somerset Levels.
