= Curry and Hay Moors =

Biological Site of Special Scientific Interest

- Site of Special Scientific Interest
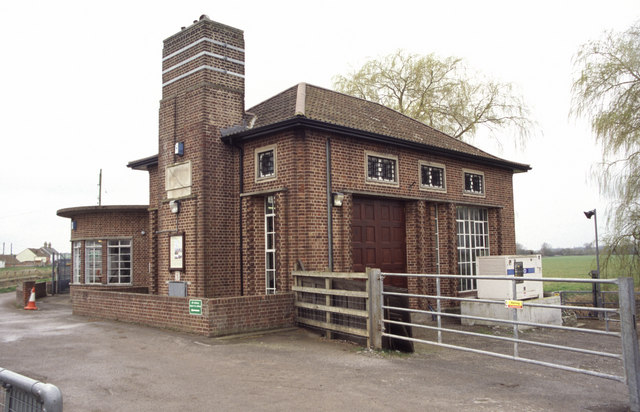
- Curry Moor Pumping Station

- Location within Somerset
- Location of Curry and Hay Moors.
- Area of search: Somerset
- Grid reference: ST323273
- Coordinates: 51.04105°N 2.96701°W
- Interest: Biological
- Area: 472.8 hectares (4.728 km^{2}; 1.825 sq mi)
- Notification date: 1992

Curry and Hay Moors (grid reference ST323273) is a 472.8 hectare (1168.1 acre) biological Site of Special Scientific Interest in Somerset, notified in 1992.

Curry and Hay Moors form part of the complex of grazing marshes known as the Somerset Levels and Moors. The low-lying site is situated adjacent to the River Tone which annually overtops, flooding the fields in winter. Soils are predominantly alluvial clays overlying Altcar series peats. The flora and fauna of the ditches and rhynes is of national importance. Over 70 aquatic and bankside vascular plants have been recorded including frogbit (Hydrocharis morsus-ranae), flowering rush (Butomus umbellatus), wood club-rush (Scirpus sylvaticus) and lesser water-plantain (Baldellia ranunculoides). Over 100 species of aquatic invertebrates inhabit the ditches including one nationally rare soldier fly, (Odontomyia ornata) and 13 nationally scarce species including the water beetles Agabus uliginosus, Hydaticus transversalis and Helophorus nanus.

In winter the flooded fields provide food for large numbers of waterfowl with several thousand northern lapwing, hundreds of common snipe and smaller numbers of golden plover and dunlin regularly present. Over two hundred Bewick's swans have been recorded, making the site an internationally important wintering ground for this species. Raptor species such as short-eared owl, merlin and peregrine regularly hunt over the site in winter. Vertebrate species present include barred grass snake and common frog. Eurasian otters are regularly recorded on the site.

The moor was flooded during the winter flooding of 2013–14 on the Somerset Levels.
