= North Moor =

North Moor, A site of interest for Biologist

- Site of Special Scientific Interest
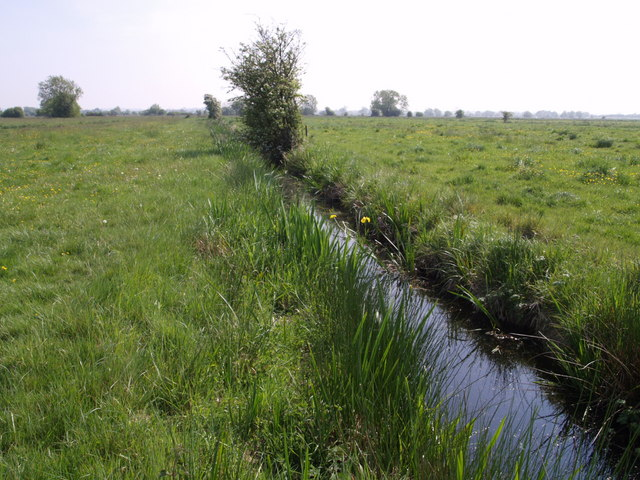

- Location within Somerset
- Location of North Moor.
- Area of search: Somerset
- Grid reference: ST325305
- Coordinates: 51.06984°N 2.96476°W
- Interest: Biological
- Area: 676.3 hectares (6.763 km^{2}; 2.611 sq mi)
- Notification date: 1986

North Moor (grid reference ST325305) is a 676.3 hectare biological Site of Special Scientific Interest near Lyng in Somerset, England. It was designated a Site of Special Scientific Interest in 1986.

North Moor is a nationally important grazing marsh and ditch system on the Somerset Levels and Moors. A range of neutral grassland types supporting common and scarce plants has developed mainly due to variations in soils and management practices. Aquatic plant communities are exceptionally diverse with good populations of nationally scarce species. The site has special interest in its bird life.

North Moor was flooded during the Winter flooding of 2013–14 on the Somerset Levels.
