= Lytes Cary, Somerset =

Lytes Cary, Somerset may refer to:

- The manor house called Lytes Cary
- The settlement of Lytes Cary in the parish of Charlton Mackrell
