= Lytes Cary =

Grade I listed house in Somerset, UK

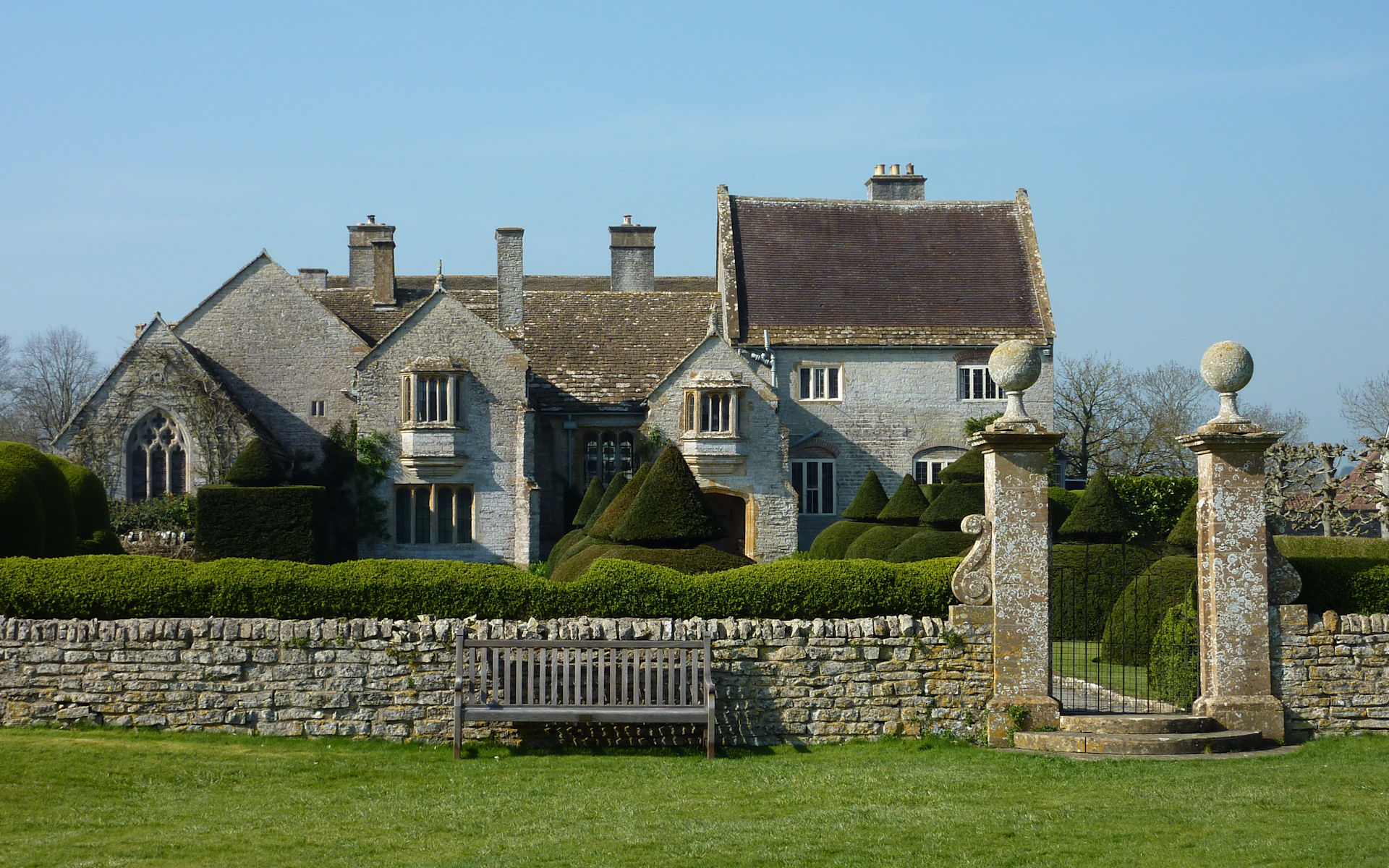
- East front to the main house

- Location within Somerset

General information
- Architectural style: Mixed architecture including Tudor
- Location: near Charlton Mackrell, Somerton, England
- Coordinates: 51.0358°N 2.6677°W
- Construction started: 14th century
- Completed: 19th century

Lytes Cary is a manor house with associated chapel and gardens near Charlton Mackrell and Somerton in Somerset, England. The property, owned by the National Trust, has parts dating to the 14th century, with other sections dating to the 15th, 16th, 18th, and 20th centuries. "Yet all parts blend to perfection with one another and with the gentle sunny landscape that surrounds them," comments Nikolaus Pevsner. The House is listed as Grade I by English Heritage.

The chapel predates the existing house, having been built around 1343, and functioned as a chantry chapel, where masses could be said for the souls of the family, both living and dead. The great hall was added in the 15th century and the Oriel Room in the 16th. Various renovations were undertaken during the 16th and 17th centuries after which the house fell into disrepair with the north range being demolished by the early 19th century. In 1907 Sir Walter Jenner of the Jenner baronets bought the house and restored it in a period style, furnishing it with fine 17th century and 18th century oak furniture, antique tapestries and fabrics modelled after medieval textiles, along with historic and period paintings. On his death in 1948 he left the house to the National Trust.

The gardens are listed as Grade II on the Register of Historic Parks and Gardens of special historic interest in England. The original 17th-century gardens have disappeared. However, the Jenners laid them out in an Arts and Crafts style with a series of 'rooms', which are separated from each other by high, neatly clipped box and yew hedges. These are complemented by ponds and walks in and between each of the 'rooms'.

== History ==
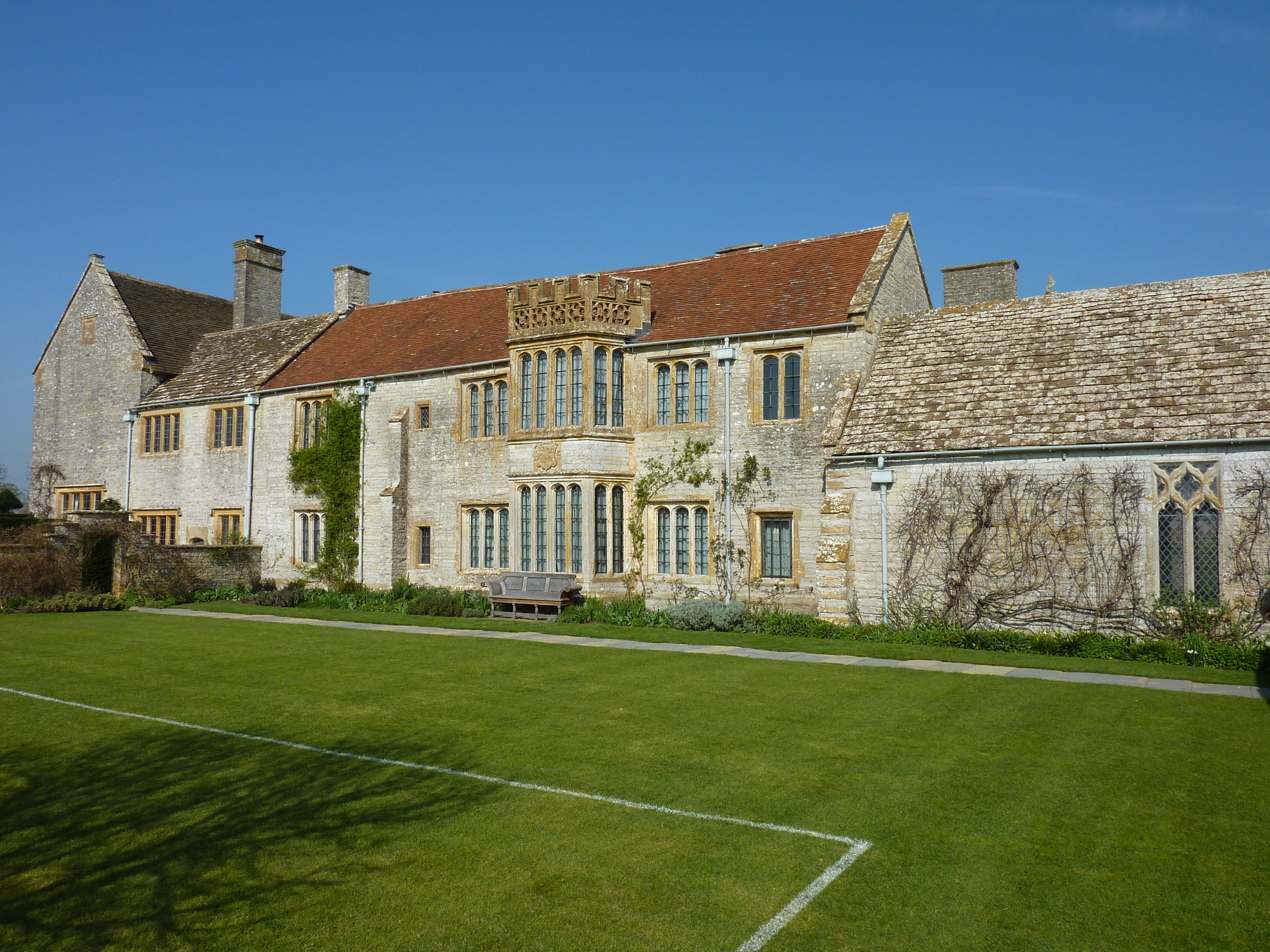
South Elevation

The parkland surrounding the house includes the site of a deserted medieval settlement which is a scheduled monument.

The unusual name derives from the Lyte family who lived at Lytes Cary for over four centuries, and the River Cary which flows nearby. The first documentary evidence is from 1285 when it was known as Kari. William le Lyte was a feudal tenant of the estate in 1286, and the Lyte family occupied and added to the house until the mid-18th century. The earliest surviving part of the manor and associated buildings is the chapel, which dates to the mid-14th century.

The Great Hall was built in the mid-15th century, and in the early 16th century the entrance porch and oriel room were added to the eastern side of the hall, and the great parlour and little parlour to the south of the hall, with bedrooms above. Sometime after the Lyte family sold the Manor in 1755, tenants moved in and the house gradually fell into disrepair. In 1810, it was reported by a neighbour that the north range 'had lately been destroyed and a farm house built on the site', (this north range is dated by architectural historians to the late 18th century) and by the time John Buckler came to draw the house in 1835 the west range had also disappeared.

In 1907, Sir Walter Jenner of the Jenner baronets and son of the late Sir William Jenner, physician to Queen Victoria, bought Lytes Cary. At that time the Great Hall was being used as a cider store and the Great Parlour was full of farm equipment. Jenner's brother Leopold had just bought and started to restore Avebury Manor in Wiltshire, and Jenner was inspired by his brother's work there. He set about restoring Lytes Cary and decorating the interiors in period style, including fine 17th century and 18th century oak furniture, antique tapestries and fabrics modelled after medieval textiles. He had the west range rebuilt in a plain William and Mary style by the architect C.E. Ponting, but left the historic core of the house mostly untouched. It incorporates carvings believed to be from the demolished St Benet Gracechurch.

Jenner left the manor to the National Trust after he died in 1948. The house was designated as a Grade I listed building in 1959. The National Trust opened the west range as a holiday rental property in 2006. Only the older parts of the house are open to the public.

== Architecture ==
=== House ===
The two-storey house and the chapel are built of the local Blue Lias stone. Parts of the house have mellow honey-coloured Hamstone dressings, especially around windows and at quoins; the later 18th century additions have brick dressings. The roofs are stone tiled with some later terracotta tiles.

=== Chapel ===
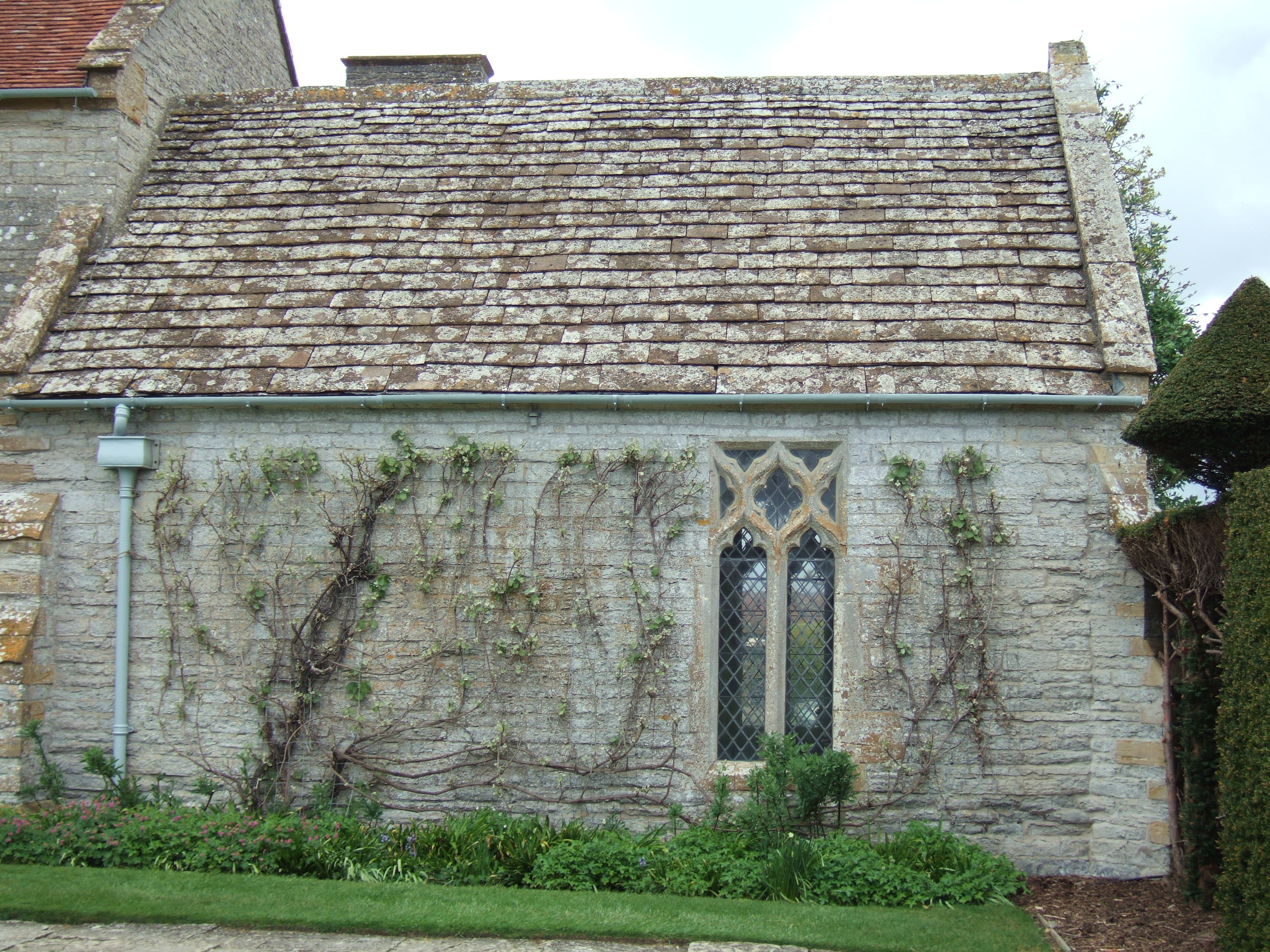
South front of the chapel

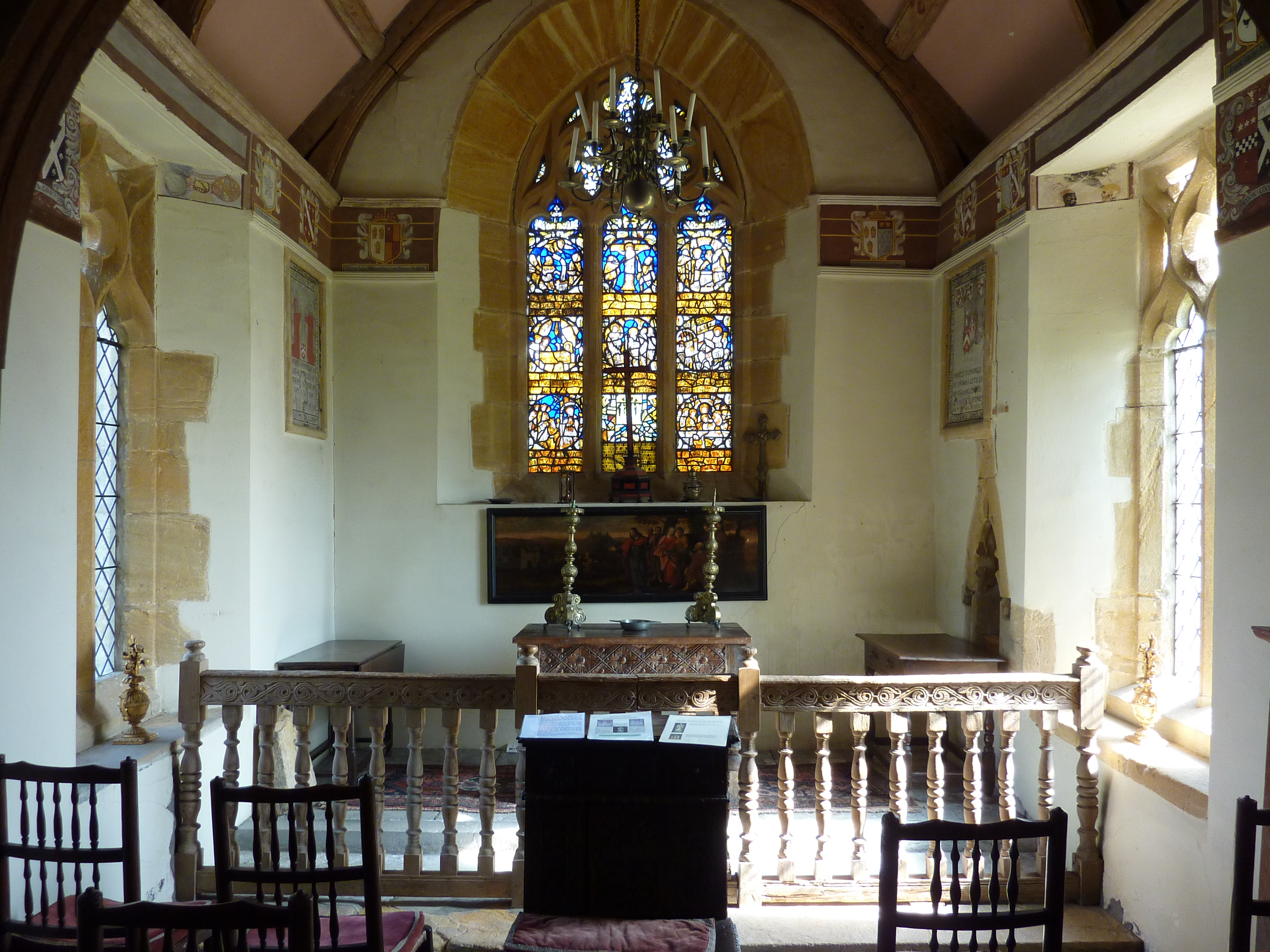
The Chapel Altar

The chapel predates the existing house, and functioned as a chantry chapel, where masses could be said for the souls of the family, both living and dead. It was built by Peter Lyte in about 1343, and was completed by 1358, and would have served both the original manor which now no longer survives and later the existing house. It has a small window, or squint, that permitted servants and others to observe communion from the house.

The chapel was thoroughly renovated in 1631 by Thomas Lyte, who installed the arch-braced-collar truss roof, the communion rail, a rear screen and a frieze below the roof painted with the arms of the Lytes and their relations. A monument to the south of the altar records Thomas' work on the chapel. In 1912 Sir Walter Jenner added the stained glass, including medieval glass said to have come from Charlton Mackrell church which William Le Lyte had commissioned before his death in 1316.

=== Great Hall ===
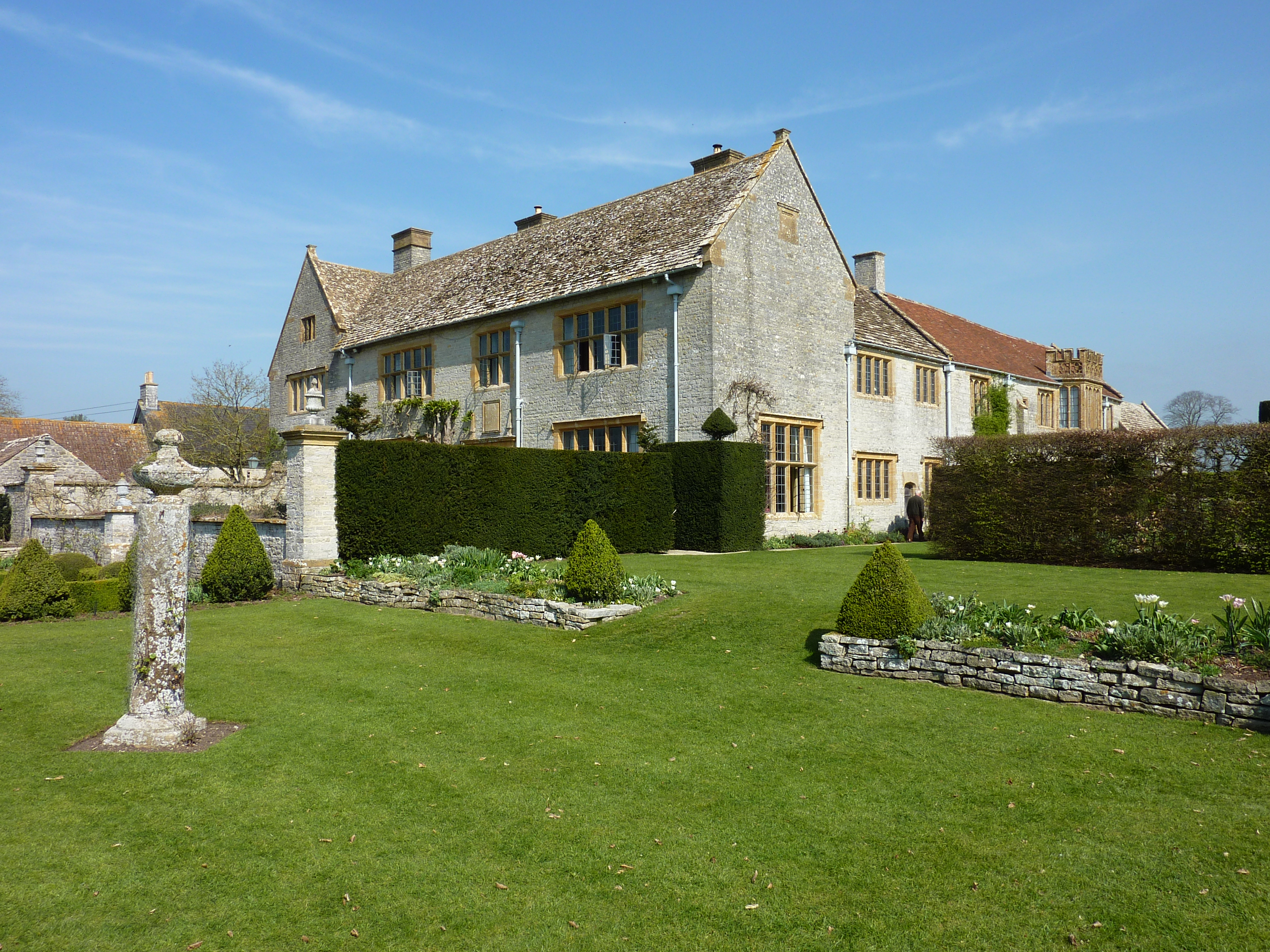
Rear of the house

This structure was built in the mid-15th century. At the southern end is a shallow raised dais on which the Lytes and favoured guests would have sat at a long table, facing the rest of the hall where the servants would have dined. The roof has arch-braced-collar trusses, with double purlins, and cusped curved windbraces. Typical of West Country design, these carved windbraces are both decorative and practical. Beneath is a cornice of pierced quatrefoils, and at the base of each main rafter is a carved wooden angel with a shield with the Lyte arms. The fireplace is 15th century, while the windows and the stained glass in them date from the early 16th century. The hall is entered from the east front porch via the screens passage, which would have divided the Hall from the kitchen and servants quarters' which would have lain to the left of the hall. The screen and gallery are not original, having been inserted by Sir Walter Jenner in 1907. He based the decoration on that of the arch from the Great Hall through to the Oriel Room. At the time of Jenner's arrival in 1907 the Great Hall was being used as a cider store.

The Great Hall is furnished with mostly 17th century oak furniture, including tables, coffers and wainscot chairs, and a great dining table, on which stand two blue and white late 17th century Delftware pyramidal tulip vases. One treasure of the home is the Lytes Herbal, a 16th-century botanical volume by noted horticulturist Henry Lyte, who was born and resided at the manor. Lyte's Niewe Herball was published in 1578 and was a translation and elaboration of the Cruydeboeck of Flemish herbalist Rembert Dodoens. The herbal was dedicated to Queen Elizabeth. A copy is displayed in the Great Hall.

=== Oriel Room ===
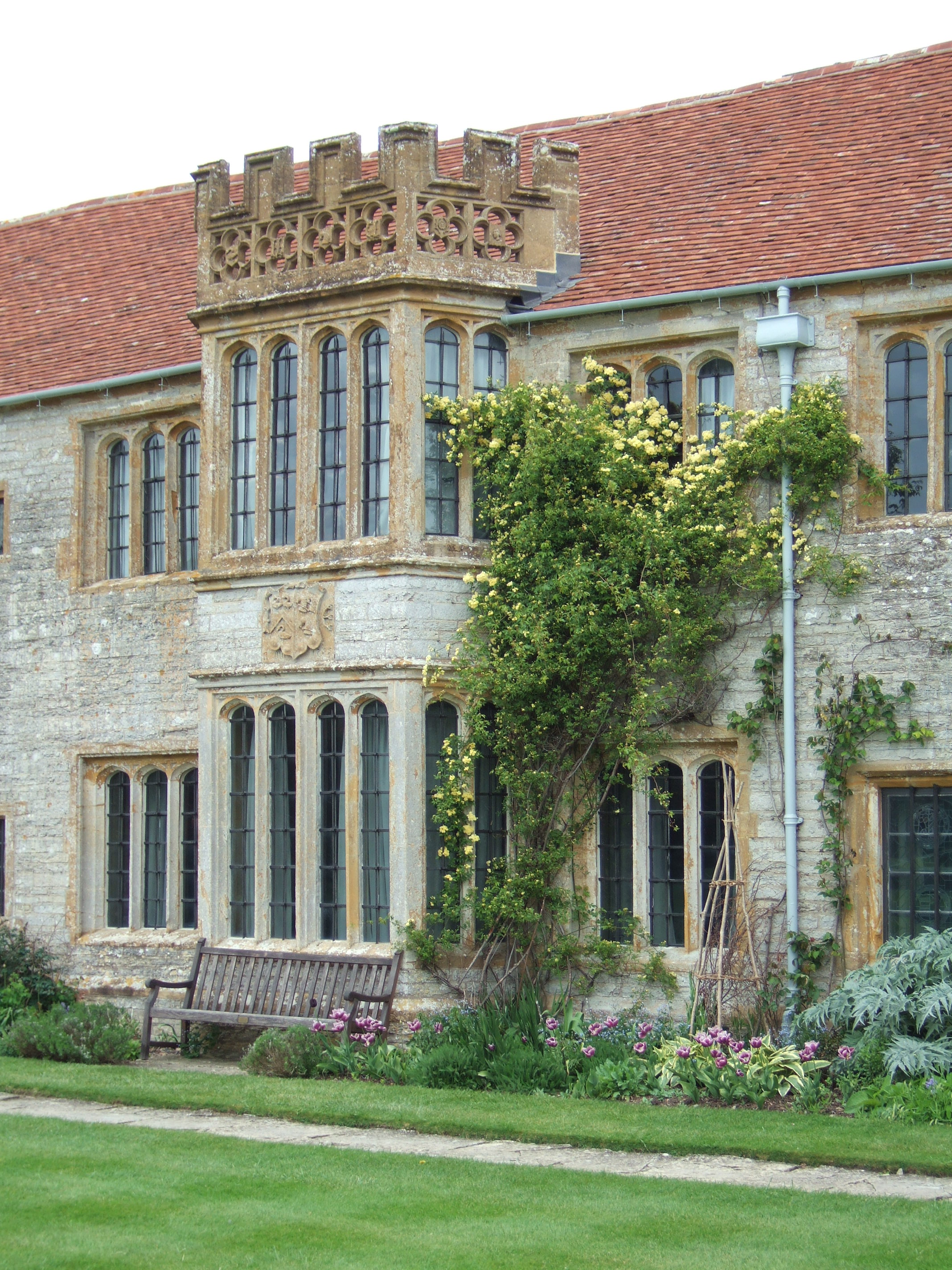
The bay windows of the Great Parlour and Great Chamber on the south front

This was added to the south of the Great Hall in the early 16th century to provide a small intimate room where the family could eat in private away from the servants. Above it is the small Oriel Bedroom, probably originally a dressing room for the Great Chamber as its only entrance is via that room. At the same time that the oriel room and bedroom were added, rooms were added or remodeled to the south of the Great Hall: the Great Parlour with Great Chamber above, and the Little Parlour with Little Chamber above. John Lyte, the builder, placed his coat of arms on the outside of the building.

=== Great Parlour ===
This was the main family sitting room on the ground floor, with the south-facing grand window giving views to the gardens, and was remodelled by John Lyte in 1533. In the early 17th century Thomas Lyte added the wood paneling (including Ionic pilasters) and the internal porch: these decorative features also had the practical benefit of keeping out the drafts. In the 20th century the room was being used as a store for farm equipment. Sir Walter Jenner had the paint stripped from the panelling to reveal the original warm-coloured oak.

Above is the Great Chamber, an impressive room with a barrel ceiling with geometrical plaster decoration featuring John Lyte's arms and those of his wife, Edith Horsey. This ceiling is a rare survival. The wall above the bed displays the royal coat of arms and Tudor roses, signifying Lyte's loyalty to King Henry VIII (whose government Lyte represented in Somerset). The panelling is 17th century, as are the great four poster bed and the tapestries on the walls. Some of the original oak panelling of the room may have been used in the construction of the canopy of the bed.

=== Little Parlour ===
This smaller room may have been used by Henry and Thomas Lyte for their studies. It too has later paneling and an alcove in which are displayed a collection of early glassware. Above this room is the Little Chamber, used by Sir Walter Jenner as his bedroom. The bed came from Burton Pynsent House in Somerset, a house given to William Pitt the Elder by an admirer of his achievements as prime minister.

=== Paintings ===
Sir Walter Jenner furnished the rooms with furniture and included historic and newly commissioned paintings. The paintings include: portraits of Lady Catherine Neville by Robert Peake James Scott, 1st Duke of Monmouth and Mary II of England by Sir Peter Lely and William III of England by Godfrey Kneller, along with landscapes by Jan Wyck and Jack Green. Oil paintings of horses by George Denholm Armour and George Richard Pain are also included in the extensive collection.

== Gardens ==
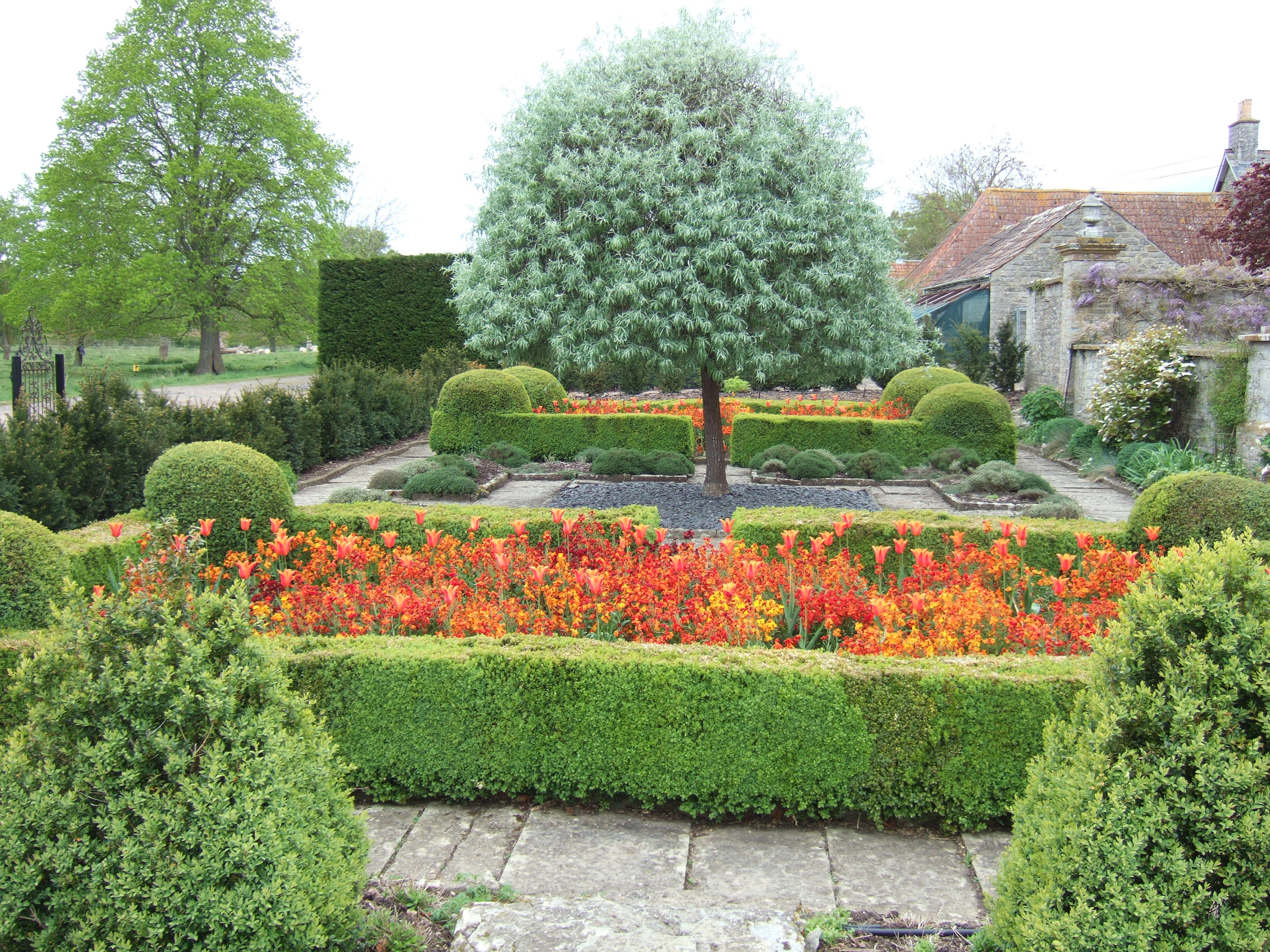
The Cutting Garden

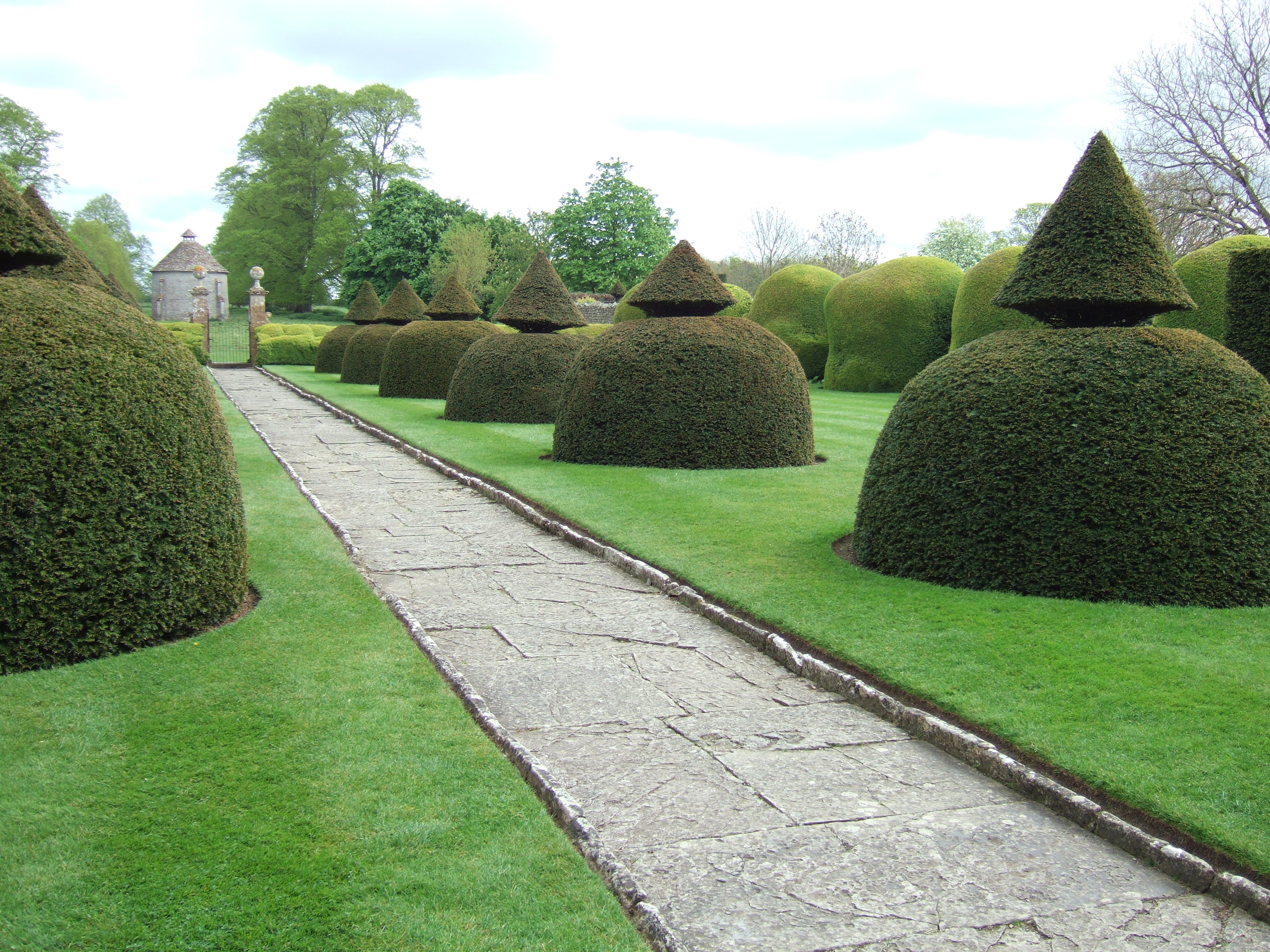
The Apostle Garden

All trace of Henry Lyte's garden has disappeared. Records show that his son Thomas kept a very well-stocked orchard, which included in 1618 "Apples, 3 skore severall sorts. pears and Wardens (a type of pear), 44 sorts. Plummes, 15 divers kynds. Grapes, 3 severall sortes. Cherries, 1. Walnuts, 3. Peaches, 1." By the Victorian period the garden had run to seed, and so the Jenners had to start from scratch on their arrival in 1907. They had the gardens designed and constructed to include a series of hedged and walled "rooms" with topiary, specimen trees, a pool, statuary, croquet lawn, walkways, an Elizabethan orchard, and a herbal border that includes plants described in the Lytes Herbal. The gate piers at the east and west entrances are listed buildings.

The gardens were constructed in a series of 'rooms', which are separated from each other by high, neatly clipped box and yew hedges. The gardens were influenced by the Arts and Crafts style popular at the time. The Jenners had a garden staff of four.

In 1965 Graham Stuart Thomas, the National Trust's first Gardens Adviser designed the Main Border. From 1955 to 1997 the Trust's tenants at the Manor, Biddy and Jeremy Chittenden, transformed the garden, and Biddy rethought and replanted the main border in 1996, using new plants but following Stuart Thomas's colour scheme.

The gardens are listed as Grade II on the Register of Historic Parks and Gardens of special historic interest in England. A barn and other outbuildings north west of the house are listed buildings.

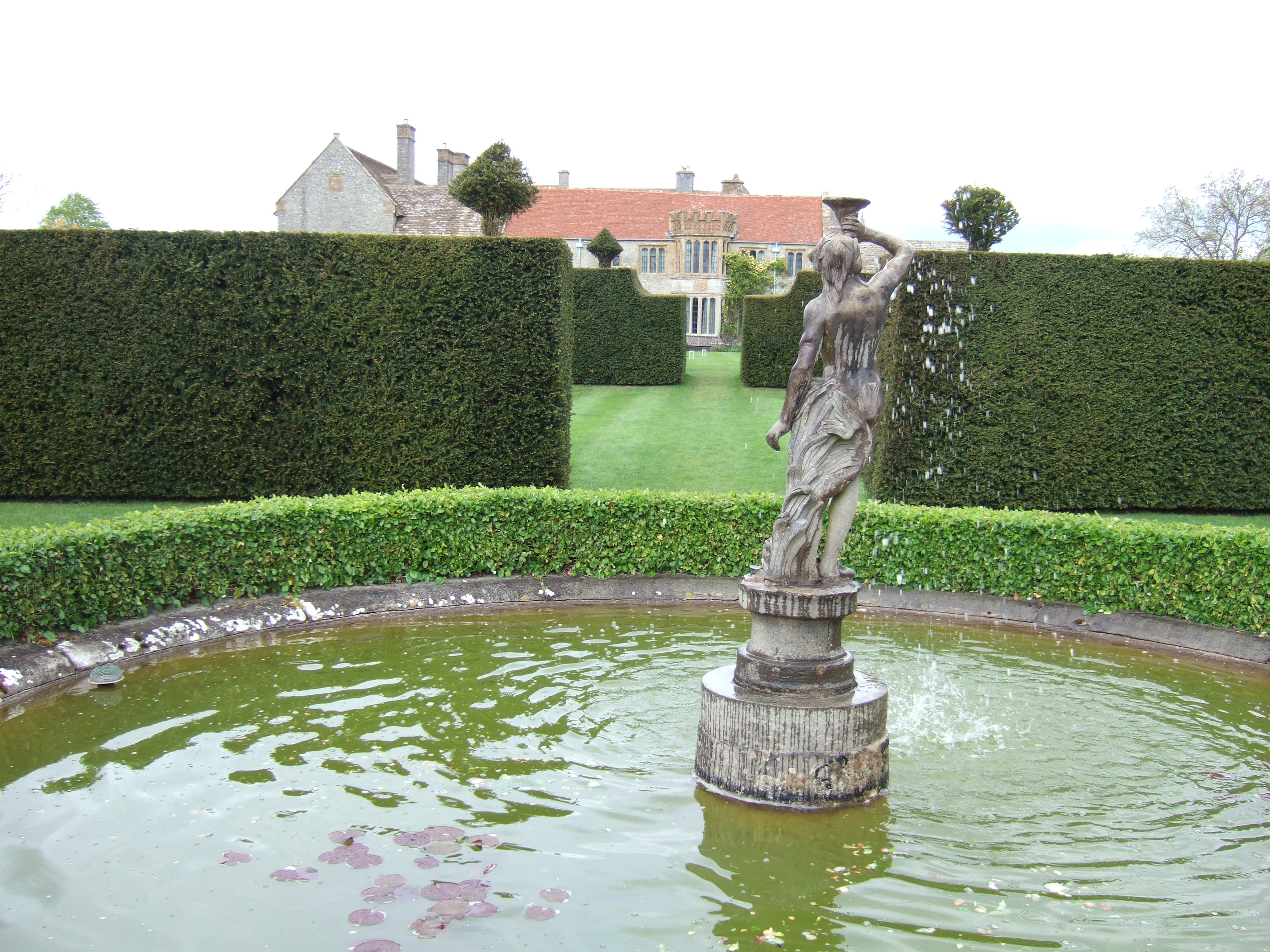
Pond Garden looking north towards the house through the Seat Garden and Croquet Lawn

The Apostle garden is aligned on the front door in the East front of the house and a building which has been described as a water tower, built by the Jenners in imitation of the dovecote at Avebury Manor, which was wrongly identified as a Dovecote by English Heritage. The garden is a severe, formal approach, flanked by topiarised yews, and is "deliberately low-key and simple so as not to distract from the beauty of the building". The main border is 35 metres (114.8 ft) long and at its best in midsummer. The flowers grade from blues and yellows, through creams and apricots to pinks, mauves and reds. There is a restful White Garden beyond for contrast.

The orchard contains fruit trees such as quinces, medlars, crab apples and pears are underplanted with spring-flowering meadow plants such as snake's head fritillaries, camassias, narcissus, cowslips and lady's smock. The orchard is crossed by wide mown paths meeting at a central sundial. Originally four weeping elms were situated at the four corners of the garden, but they succumbed to Dutch elm disease in the early seventies and were replaced in 1973 by four weeping ash trees which make inviting 'houses'. The orchard can be viewed from the raised walk on its east side, another idea copied from Avebury Manor. A main path known as the Long walk is based on the Long Walk at Hidcote Manor Garden in Gloucestershire, although it is on a smaller scale. It is a plain grassed walkway connecting the Raised Walk with the Pond Garden.

The pond garden, seat garden and croquet lawn are interlinked, with aligned openings to form a vista from the bay windows of the Great Parlour and Great Chamber on the south front of the house over to the Sparkford plain. A short tunnel of hornbeams link the Pond Garden to the Vase Garden, where variegated weigela is underplanted with euphorbia and vinca.

== See also ==
- Grade I listed buildings in South Somerset
- List of National Trust properties in Somerset

== Bibliography ==
- Barroll, J. Leeds (1995). Medieval and Renaissance Drama in England. Fairleigh Dickinson Univ Press. p. 28. ISBN 9780838635704.
- Bond, James (1998). Somerset parks and gardens: A landscape history. Tiverton: Somerset Books. ISBN 978-0861834655.
- Baggs, A. P.; Bush, R. J. E.; Tomlinson, Margaret (1974). R. W. Dunning (ed.). "Parishes: Charlton Mackrell". A History of the County of Somerset: Volume 3. Institute of Historical Research.
- Dunning, Robert (1991). Some Somerset Country Houses. Wimborne: Dovecote Press. ISBN 978-0946159857.
- Garnett, Oliver (2001). Lytes Cary (National Trust guide book). National Trust.
- McCann, John (2011). "Engravings as evidence of dovecotes". Vernacular Architecture. 42: 36–52. doi:10.1179/174962911X13159065475464. S2CID 162123774.
- Pevsner, Nikolaus (1958). The Buildings of England, South and West Somerset. Penguin Books; Reprinted by Yale University Press, 2003. ISBN 978-0300096446.
