= Northover =

Northover may refer to:

== Places ==
- Northover, Ilchester, Somerset, England, an old parish
- Northover, Somerset, a suburb of Glastonbury
- Mount Northover, on the border of Alberta and British Columbia, Canada

== People ==
- Benn Northover (born 1981), British actor, filmmaker and artist
- Bob Northover (fl. 1986), British sport shooter
- Dean Northover (born 1991), Canadian soccer player
- John Northover (fl. 1646), English landowner and participant in the English Civil War
- Lindsay Northover, Baroness Northover (born 1954), British politician
- Mark Northover (1950–2004), British actor
- Zara Northover (born 1984), Jamaican shot putter

== See also ==
- Northover Projector, a British anti-tank weapon of the Second World War
