= Babcary =

Village in Somerset, England

Coordinates: 51.0541°N 2.6220°W

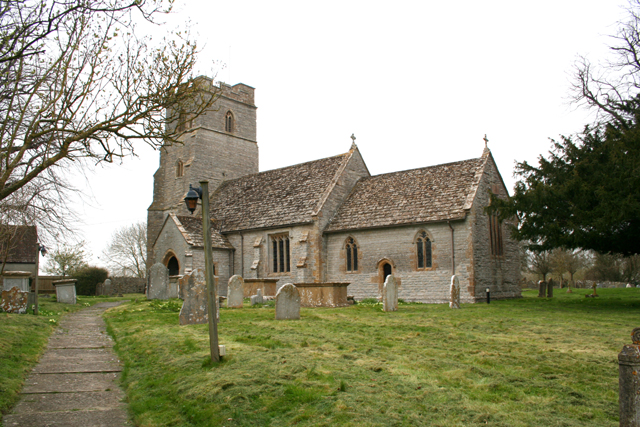
- Church of the Holy Cross

- Location within Somerset
- Population: 248 (2011)
- OS grid reference: ST5628
- Unitary authority: Somerset Council
- Ceremonial county: Somerset
- Region: South West
- Country: England
- Sovereign state: United Kingdom
- Post town: Somerton
- Postcode district: TA11
- Police: Avon and Somerset
- Fire: Devon and Somerset
- Ambulance: South Western
- UK Parliament: Glastonbury and Somerton

Babcary is a village and civil parish in Somerset, England, about 5 miles (8.0 km) east of Somerton and 6 miles (9.7 km) southwest of Castle Cary. The village has a population of 248. It lies close to the River Cary and the A37. The parish includes the hamlet of Foddington.

== History ==
The village was recorded in the Domesday Book of 1086 as Babba Cari. The parish was part of the hundred of Catsash.

Within the parish is Wimble Toot, generally interpreted as a Bronze Age bowl barrow, but an alternative interpretation is that it was a motte built between 1067 and 1069. Today the site forms a circular earthwork, 27.47 m across and 2.74 m high, with a ditch on the north-west and south-east sides, on the top of a ridge, overlooking a brook which runs into the River Cary and the old Roman road of the Fosse Way.

The Red Lion Inn has 17th-century origins and is a Grade II listed building.

The parish council was concerned with the insanitary drainage system for the village, but rejected a mains water supply in 1931 as too expensive. Electricity was provided in 1947 but mains water was not supplied until the 1950s. Sewerage remained a serious problem in the 1970s and mains drainage was not provided until 1992.

== Governance ==
The parish council has responsibility for local issues, including setting an annual precept (local rate) to cover the council's operating costs and producing annual accounts for public scrutiny. The parish council evaluates local planning applications and works with the local police, district council officers, and neighbourhood watch groups on matters of crime, security, and traffic. The parish council's role also includes initiating projects for the maintenance and repair of parish facilities, as well as consulting with the district council on the maintenance, repair, and improvement of highways, drainage, footpaths, public transport, and street cleaning. Conservation matters (including trees and listed buildings) and environmental issues are also the responsibility of the council.

For local government purposes, since 1 April 2023, the village comes under the unitary authority of Somerset Council. Prior to this, it was part of the non-metropolitan district of South Somerset, which was formed on 1 April 1974 under the Local Government Act 1972, having previously been part of Langport Rural District.

The parish is part of the Glastonbury and Somerton county constituency, represented in the House of Commons.

== Geography ==
Babcary Meadows to the north of the village is a biological Site of Special Scientific Interest because it is one of the last remaining areas of traditionally managed unimproved grassland in south Somerset and contains a rich variety of herbs. It is run as a nature reserve by the Somerset Wildlife Trust, who purchased it with grant assistance from South Somerset Council.

== Religious sites ==
The Church of the Holy Cross had its origins before the Norman Conquest. The fabric dates from the 14th and 15th centuries, with the chancel and north aisle being added in the 19th century by Benjamin Ferrey in 1875–76. The tower contains a bell dating from 1753 and made by Thomas Bilbie of the Bilbie family. It has been designated by English Heritage as a Grade II* listed building. The diarist James Woodforde was curate here from 1764-65 and describes his time in Babcary in his work "The Diary of a Country Parson".
