= Aller, Somerset =

Village in Somerset, England

Coordinates: 51°03′34″N 2°51′26″W

Aller
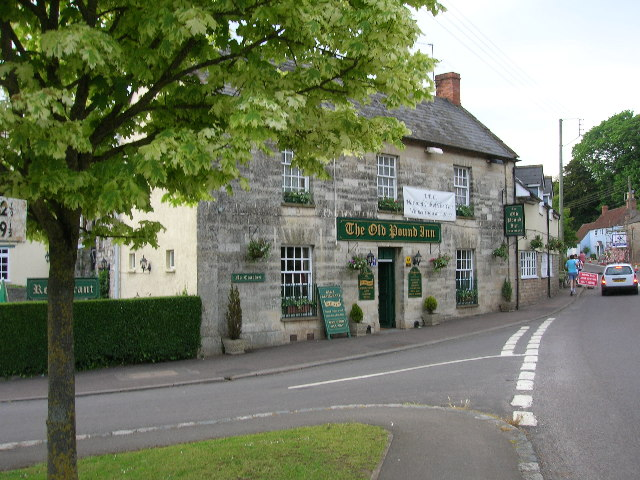
- The Old Pound Inn, Aller

- Location within Somerset
- Population: 410 (2011)
- Civil parish: Aller
- Unitary authority: Somerset Council
- Ceremonial county: Somerset
- Region: South West
- Country: England
- Sovereign state: United Kingdom
- Post town: Langport
- Postcode district: TA10
- Police: Avon and Somerset
- Fire: Devon and Somerset
- Ambulance: South Western
- UK Parliament: Glastonbury and Somerton

Aller is a village and civil parish in Somerset, England, situated 5 miles (8 km) west of Somerton on the A372 road towards Bridgwater. The village has a population of 410. The parish includes the hamlet of Beer (sometimes Bere or Bere Aller) and the deserted medieval village of Oath on the opposite bank of the River Parrett.

== History ==
Aller was listed in the Domesday Book of 1086 as Alre, meaning 'The alder tree' from the Old English alor.

The parish of Aller was part of the hundred of Somerton.

Most of the valuable meadows had been enclosed by 1577, but the surrounding fields were not enclosed until 1797. Between 1614 and 1616 there was a struggle between the lord, Sir John Davis, who had recently purchased the manor, and the tenants over the building of hedges and gates to increase the value of the remaining 47 acres (19 ha) of common ground. The meadows remained open and Davis sold the manor to John Stawell of Cothelstone in 1623.

Oath Lock marks the tidal limit of the River Parrett. It was added when it was realised that the locks at Stanmoor, Langport and Muchelney, with a half-lock at Thorney, would not provide the depth of water specified in the Act of Parliament of 4 July 1836 which authorised the building of the navigation.

== Church ==
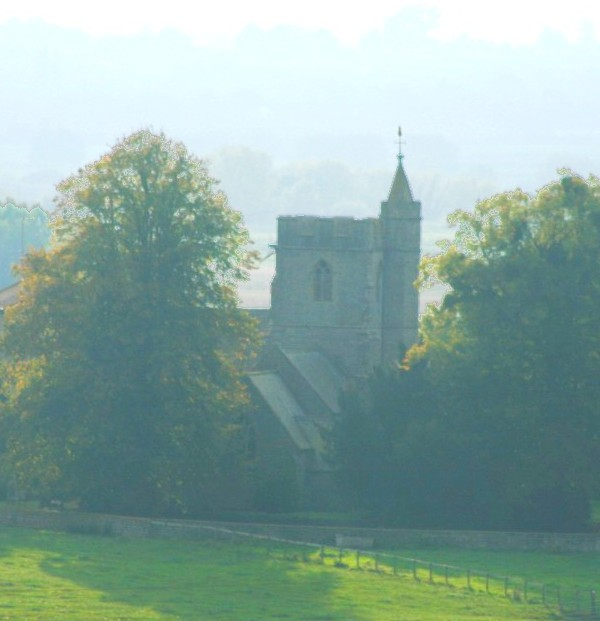
St Andrew's Church

The Church of St Andrew has Saxon origins with some parts dating from the 12th and 13th centuries, with restoration work undertaken several times since, the most major of which was in 1861–62 by John Norton. It is a Grade II* listed building. English Heritage has included it in the Heritage at Risk Register.

The font is a simple limestone bowl, less than a metre tall, which is thought to be Saxon in origin, one of only three in England and may have been the one used for the baptism of Guthrum after his defeat by King Alfred the Great after the Battle of Ethandun in 878. It was retrieved from the pond of the vicarage garden around 1870 and now stands in the south-west corner of the nave. A copy of the font was made by a stonemason in Corvallis, Oregon, in the 1880s, to memorialise the son of the rector of Aller, Rev. J.Y. Nicholson. The copy of Aller's historic font was in the Episcopalian Church of the Good Samaritan.

== Present ==
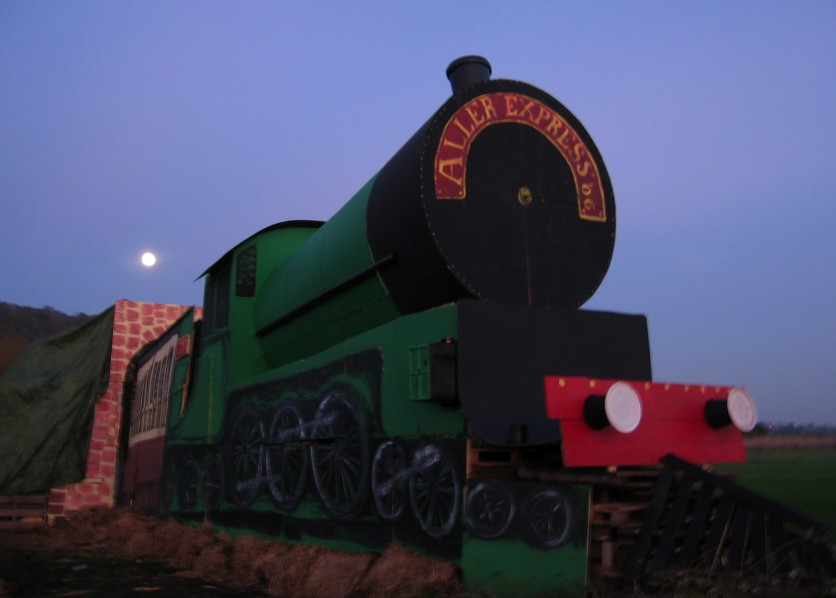
The Aller Express, 2006

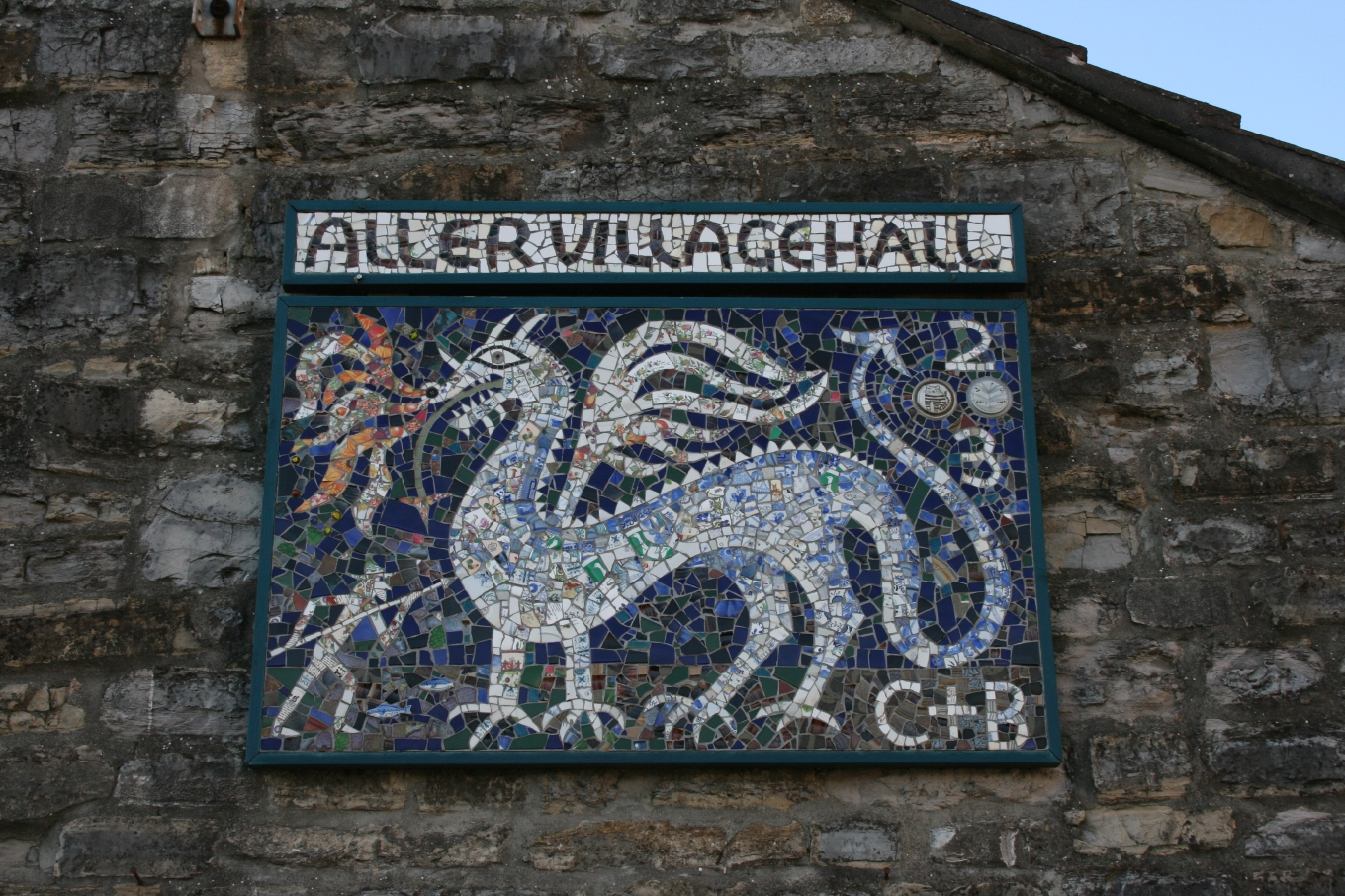
Aller Village Hall Mosaic

The social centres of the village are St Andrew's church; The Old Pound Inn pub; the "Rec" – a recreational playing field with playground equipment for children and a basketball hoop in a Dutch barn; and the Village Hall – home to village council meetings, harvest suppers, famine lunches, other charity events, a sewing circle, and bowls club.

Near to Aller are the Aller Hill and the Aller and Beer Woods biological Sites of Special Scientific Interest.

One of the most festive occasions in Aller is its Bonfire Night, when many local residents turn out to witness the torching of a novel artistic creation. In 2006, a full-size model of a steam train engine was set afire. Other years' subjects have included a piano and the Houses of Parliament. A dragon – Aller's mascot – was set afire in 2007. The 2008 bonfire chose a Batman theme.

The village is home to two large mosaics by resident potter Bryan Newman. The first located on the side of the Village Hall, features the village mascot, the Aller Dragon. The second, commissioned by the Village Council to front the central bus shelter, depicts historic characters who have figured in Aller's past.

== Governance ==
For local government purposes, since 1 April 2023, the village comes under the unitary authority of Somerset Council. Prior to this, it was part of the non-metropolitan district of South Somerset, which was formed on 1 April 1974 under the Local Government Act 1972, having previously been part of Langport Rural District.

== Notable residents ==
Aller was the birthplace of the philosopher Ralph Cudworth in 1617. John Northover (fl.1646) of Aller Court was an ardent Royalist during the Civil War.

Novelist Kim Newman grew up in Aller, where his parents Julia and Bryan Newman founded Aller Pottery, and Somerset appears frequently in Kim Newman's novels and short stories, such as in Jago (1991), The Secrets of Drearcliffe Grange School (2015), An English Ghost Story (2014) and A Christmas Ghost Story (2024).

== Bibliography ==
- Victoria County History, Somerset, vol.3, 1974, pp.61–71, Aller
