= William Jenner =

William Jenner may refer to:

- Caitlyn Jenner (born 1949; birth name William Bruce Jenner), American television personality, athlete, and LGBT rights activist
- Sir William Jenner, 1st Baronet (1815–1898), English physician who discovered the distinction between typhus and typhoid
- William E. Jenner (1908–1985), U.S. Senator from Indiana
- William John Francis Jenner (born 1940), British sinologist
