= Charlton, Somerset =

Charlton, Somerset may refer to a number of villages in Somerset, England:

- Charlton, Kilmersdon, Mendip district
- Charlton, Shepton Mallet, Mendip district
- Charlton, Taunton Deane
- Charlton Adam
- Charlton Horethorne
- Charlton Mackrell
- Charlton Musgrove
- Queen Charlton, known simply as Charlton until the 16th century
