= Church of St Mary, Charlton Mackrell =

Parish church in Somerset, England

Church of St Mary
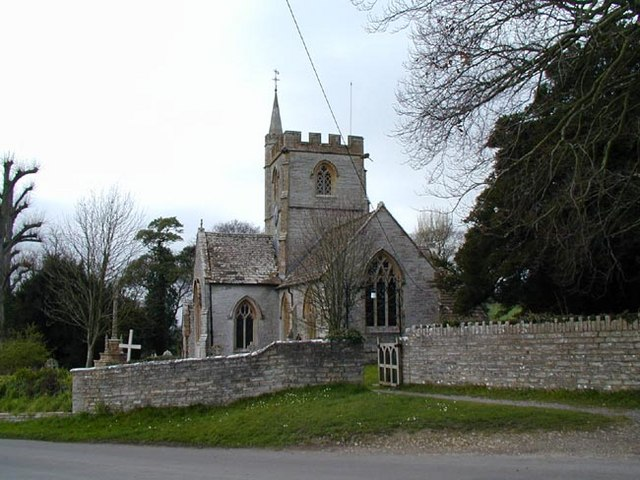

- Location within Somerset
- 51.0524°N 2.6744°W
- Location: Charlton Mackrell, Somerset, England

History
- Built: 13th century

Listed Building – Grade II*
- Official name: Church of St Mary
- Designated: 17 April 1959
- Reference no.: 1056728

The Anglican Church of St Mary in Charlton Mackrell, Somerset, England was built in the 13th century. It is a Grade II* listed building.

== History ==
The church was built in the 13th century and restored in the 1790s and 1840s. The tracery of the window of the transept was installed about 1330, however the original glass is no longer in place.

The 1840 restoration included the removal of the singing gallery and extensive reconstruction and the addition of a vestry on the north side.

The parish is part of the benefice of Somerton with the Charltons and Kingsdon within the Diocese of Bath and Wells.

== Architecture ==
The hamstone building has slate roofs. The chancel has corner buttresses as does the south transept. The tower has gargoyles on the outside and six bells within.

Inside the church is a 13th-century circular font, while most of the decoration and stained glass is from the 19th century Victorian restoration.

== See also ==
- List of ecclesiastical parishes in the Diocese of Bath and Wells
