= Charlton House, Charlton Mackrell =

Historic house in Somerset, England

Coordinates: 51.0590°N 2.6727°W

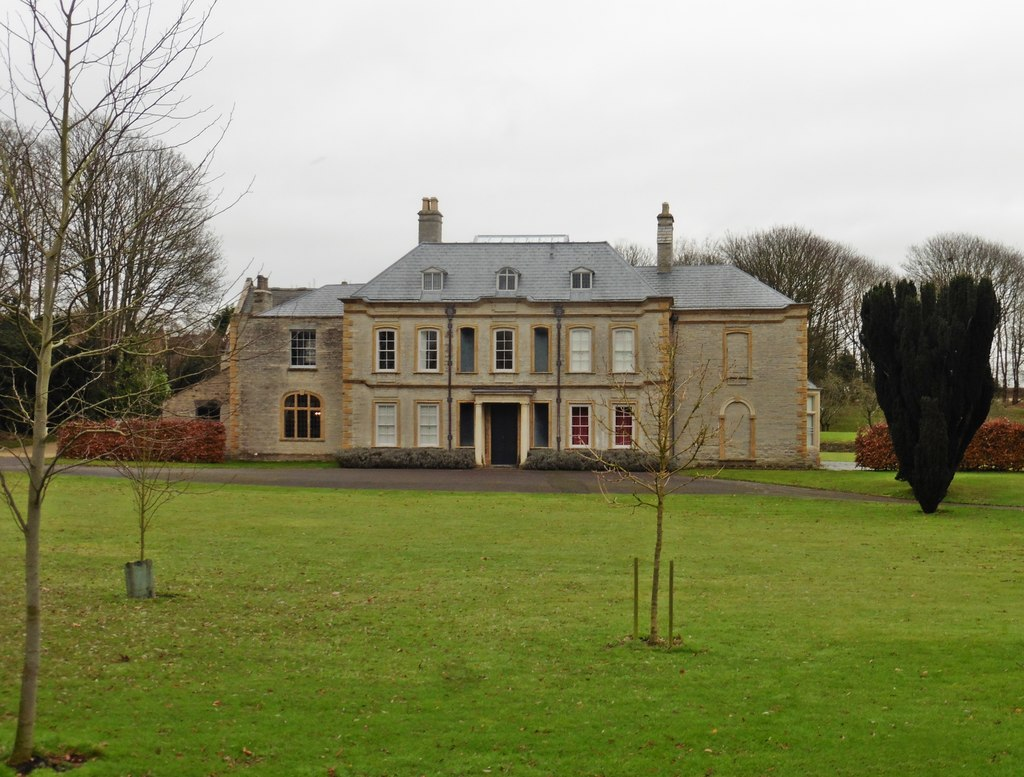
Charlton House, 2017

Charlton House is a Grade II* listed house in Charlton Mackrell, Somerset.

== History ==
Charlton House was built in 1726, with later extensions. The property, then known as Lanchers, was owned by the Lyte family of Lytes Cary from 1540, and Thomas Lyte (died 1748) built Charlton House in 1726.

In 1726, Lyte settled the house on his daughter Silvestra on her marriage to Thomas Blackwell, rector of St Clement Danes, London. Their two daughters Silvestra, wife of James Monypenny, and Mary sold the house to John Pyne of Low Ham in 1758.

John Pyne died in 1791, and left the house and lands to his son William, who conveyed them to Robert Clarke of Castle Cary in 1794, who in turn sold the estate to John Jerritt in 1800. Jerritt owned the house from 1800 to 1806, and diverted the Kingweston Road further west, and the old road became the carriage drive to the house.

In 1806, it was bought was by Lionel Lukin, then by John Whitelocke in 1809, and by William Dickinson in 1811. Along with the manor of Charlton Mackrell, the house remained in the Dickinson family until 1930, including the politician, Francis Henry Dickinson when it was sold by his grandson, William Francis Dickinson.
