= Aller Hill =

Nature reserve in Somerset, England

- Site of Special Scientific Interest
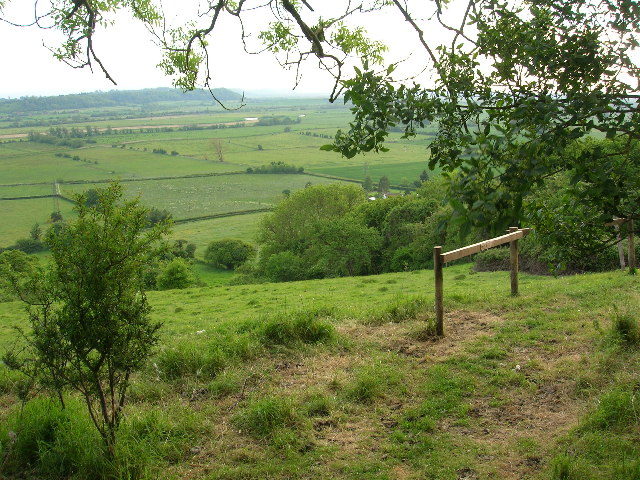

- Location within Somerset
- Location of Aller Hill.
- Area of search: Somerset
- Grid reference: ST408291
- Coordinates: 51.05817°N 2.84608°W
- Interest: Biological
- Area: 18.4 hectares (0.184 km^{2}; 0.071 sq mi)
- Notification date: 1988

Aller Hill (grid reference ST408291) is an 18.4 hectare (45.4 acre) biological Site of Special Scientific Interest near Aller in Somerset, notified in 1988.

The site contains three species of plant which are nationally rare and a further three which are of restricted distribution in Somerset. The central area contains a sward dominated by sheep's fescue (Festuca ovina) in combination with yellow oat grass (Trisetum flavescens) and quaking-grass (Briza media). Salad burnet (Sanguisorba minor) forms a major component of the sward with rough marsh-mallow (Althaea hirsuta) and nit-grass (Gastridium ventricosum), two nationally rare species, also present.

Aller and Beer Woods on the slopes of the hill are also designated as a biological Site of Special Scientific Interest.
