= The Court, Charlton Mackrell =

House in Charlton Mackrell, Somerset, England

Coordinates: 51°03′12″N 2°40′30″W

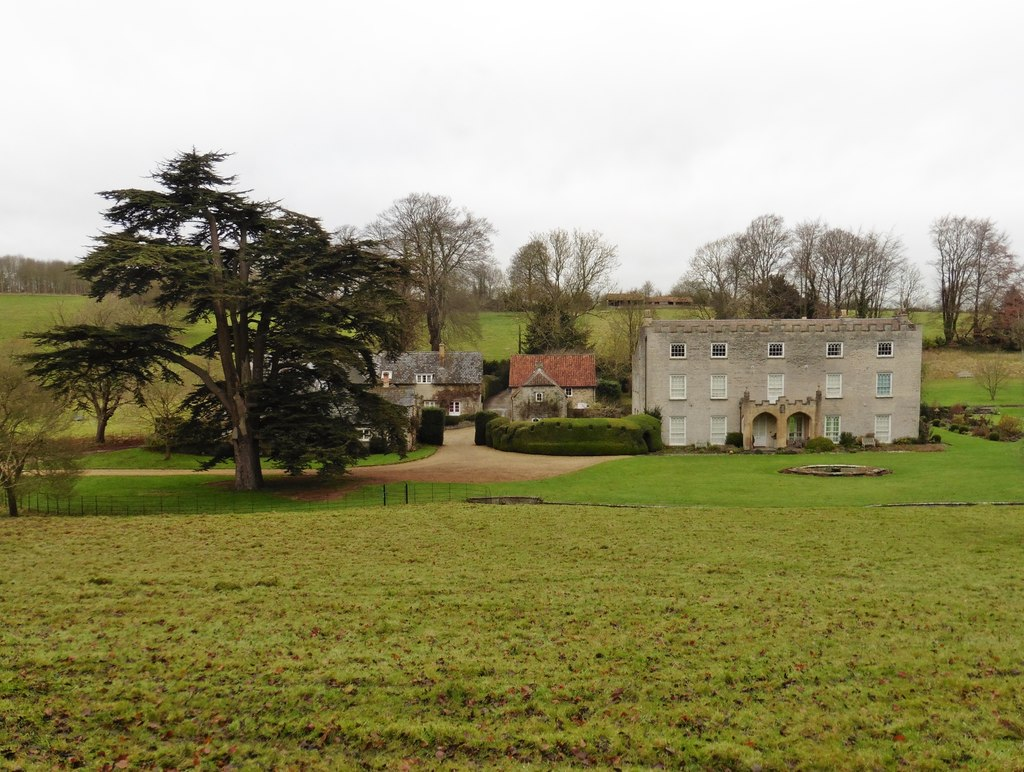

The Court is a Grade II* listed house, and former rectory, in Charlton Mackrell, in Somerset, England.

== History ==
The Court was built in 1792, for Richard Ford, the rector of Charlton Mackrell, in a "Georgian Gothic" style.

A rectory on the site was first recorded in 1524. By the late 18th-century it was described as "very ruinous" and Ford "repaired" it in 1792. In reality, Ford had it "almost totally rebuilt". The house was sold by the Church of England in 1922, following the merger of the living.

Later inhabitants included William Brymer (1796–1852), who became Archdeacon of Bath from 1840 until his death in 1852.

The Court has nine bedrooms, four reception rooms, six bathrooms, and 21 acres of land. In April 2017, it was listed for sale at £3.75 million.
