= River Cary =

River in Somerset, England

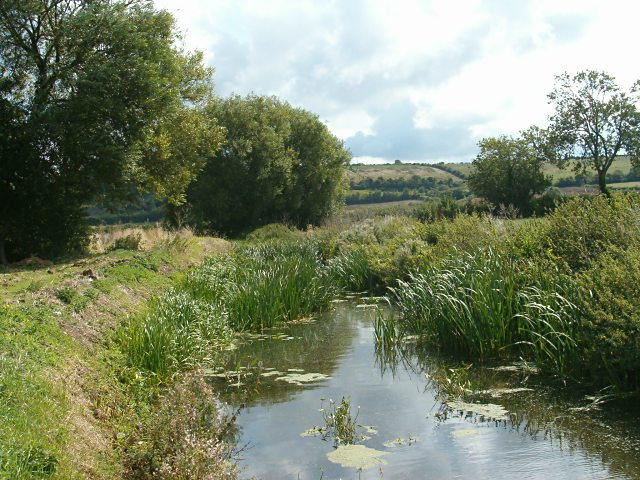

Location
- Country: England
- County: Somerset
- Region: Somerset Levels
- City: Somerton, Somerset

Physical characteristics
- Source: Park Pond
  - location: Castle Cary, Somerset, England
  - coordinates: 51°05′12″N 2°30′49″W
- Mouth: River Parrett
  - location: Dunball, Somerset, England
  - coordinates: 51°09′40″N 2°59′18″W

The River Cary is a river in Somerset, England. It is sourced from the Park Pond in Castle Cary and flows towards the southwest.

== Etymology ==
The origin of the name Cary is uncertain. It may be derived from pre-Celtic kar-, meaning "stony, hard", or the Celtic element car meaning dear, pleasant (cf. Welsh cari, "love").

== Course ==
The River Cary has its source at Park Pond in Castle Cary, and then flows southwest through Cary Moor to Babcary, where there is a biological Site of Special Scientific Interest at Babcary Meadows and Cary Fitzpaine. It then flows northwest through Charlton Mackrell to the north of Somerton, passing under the Somerton Viaduct. Here the river channel has been straightened and drains the surrounding wetland as it heads north to Kings Sedge Moor. The Cary passes through King's Sedgemoor continuing west across the moors south of the Polden Hills. At Henley it joins the artificial channels of the Sutton Moor Rhyne and the King's Sedgemoor Drain, both of which drain the wetland. Much of the water is now diverted into King's Sedgemoor Drain, which continues across the moors to join the estuary of the River Parrett at Dunball.

== Pollution ==
In 1995 a major pollution incident occurred when lindane and mercury seed dressing were poured down a drain which leads into the river near Somerton.
