= Old Town Hall, Somerton =

Municipal building in Somerton, Somerset, England

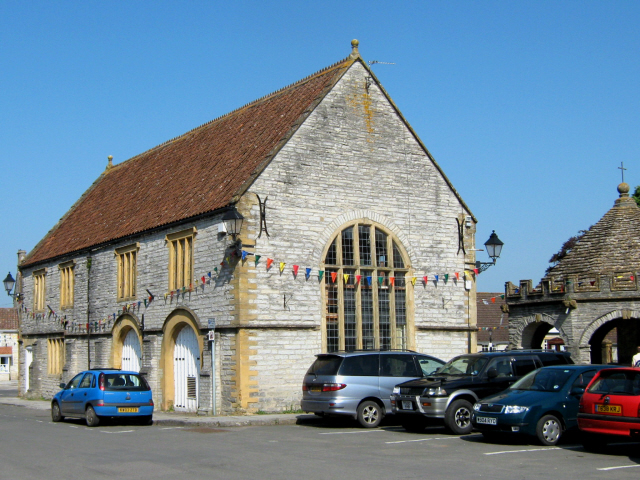
- The east end of the Old Town Hall

- Shown in Somerset
- 51.0538°N 2.7283°W
- Location: Market Place, Somerton

History
- Built: circa 1688

Site notes
- Architectural style: Neoclassical style

Listed Building – Grade II
- Official name: The Market Hall
- Designated: 17 April 1959
- Reference no.: 1346033

The Old Town Hall is a municipal building in the Market Place in Somerton, Somerset, England. The building, which is used as an arts centre, is a Grade II listed building.

== History ==
The building was originally commissioned as a shambles, i.e. a meat market, and the site chosen for it was to just to the south of the Butter Cross which itself was rebuilt in 1673. The lord of the manor at the time was Sir Stephen Fox of Redlynch Park, courtier to King Charles II, and the "richest commoner in the three kingdoms". The shambles was designed in the neoclassical style, built in rubble masonry with hamstone dressings and formed part of a trio of new buildings, including a tolsey house (i.e. a building for administering market tolls) and a storage shed (used for storing sheep hurdles), which were provided for the use of local merchants under a lease of markets and fairs, in 1688.

The design involved a rectangular two-storey building; the west end featured a gabled porch on the ground floor and an arched five-light mullioned and transomed on the first floor, while the east end was fenestrated by a full-height semi-circular five-light mullioned and transomed window. The architectural historian Nikolaus Pevsner commented that, while most of the building appears to date from the 17th century, the detailing of the large window at the east end indicates a date, for that window at least, "of circa 1700 or perhaps even later". The north elevation featured, in the left hand section, a five-light mullioned and transomed widow and, in the right hand section, a pair of two-light mullioned windows on the ground floor and a single five-light mullioned window on the first floor. The southern elevation featured, on the ground floor, a four-light mullioned window in the left hand section and two arched openings in the right hand section and, on the first floor, a row of four three-light mullioned windows. Internally, the principal rooms were the market hall on the ground floor and the assembly room on the first floor. The gabled porch at the west end was originally used a lock-up for petty criminals.

The building was repaired in 1719, and again, in 1799. The assembly room on the first floor was used for public events such as the annual meeting of the Mid-Somerset Labourer's Friend Society, chaired by the local member of parliament, Sir Alexander Hood, in October 1850. It was also used for magistrates' court hearings until 1870. Ownership of the building was passed down various generations of the Fox family until Giles Fox-Strangways, 6th Earl of Ilchester sold it to the parish council in 1913. For much of the 20th century the ground floor accommodated a billiards room and was used as a community events venue known as the "Somerton Club" while the assembly room was used as a furniture store.

The building was acquired by a developer and the whole structure was converted for office use in 1982. It was then re-configured again for use as an art gallery and shop managed by Art Care Education (operating as ACE Arts), which was established as a charity in May 2016.
