= Somerton Viaduct =

Historic railway viaduct in Somerset, England

Coordinates: 51.0591°N 2.7263°W

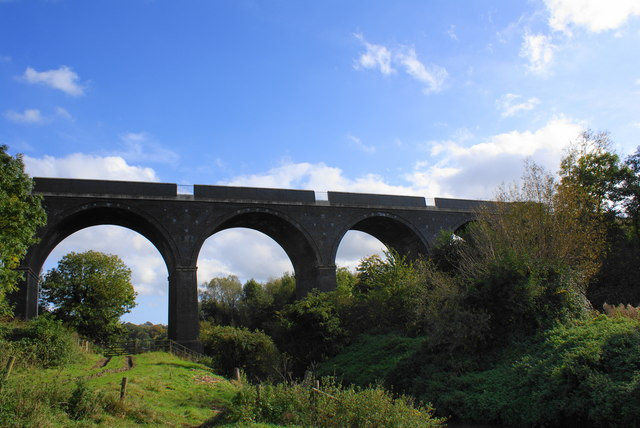
View of the Viaduct from land adjoining the River Cary

The Somerton Viaduct is a historic railway viaduct in the town of Somerton in Somerset, England. It is situated on the Langport and Castle Cary Railway, known as the Castle Cary Cut-off, on the Reading to Taunton Line. It carries the railway over the River Cary.

The viaduct was opened in 1906. The construction was overseen by Great Western Railway engineer P.A. Anthony.
