= Aller and Beer Woods =

Protected area in Somerset, England

- Site of Special Scientific Interest
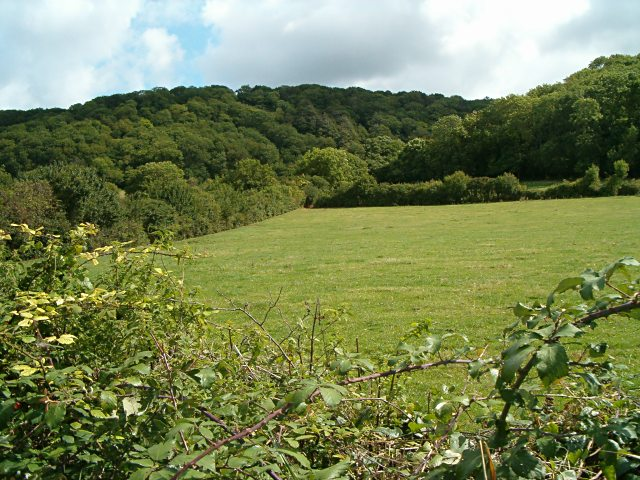

- Location within Somerset
- Location of Aller and Beer Woods.
- Area of search: Somerset
- Grid reference: ST404305
- Coordinates: 51.07072°N 2.85202°W
- Interest: Biological
- Area: 140.6 acres (0.569 km^{2}; 0.2197 sq mi)
- Notification date: 1952

Aller and Beer Woods (grid reference ST404305) is a 56.9 hectares (141 acres) biological Site of Special Scientific Interest. off the A372 Othery to Langport road near Aller in Somerset. It was notified in 1952.

This Somerset Wildlife Trust reserve, which is about 3.5 kilometres (2 mi) north-west of Langport and 11 kilometres (7 mi) south-east of Bridgwater, consists of large blocks of semi-natural ancient woodland along the west-facing slope of Aller Hill, overlooking King's Sedgemoor. The reserve is about 40 ha (99 acres) and the underlying geology of most of it is Lias limestone. Prior to the twentieth century it appears to have been managed for centuries as traditional coppice woodlandd.

Aller and Beer Woods are outstanding examples of ancient, escarpment woodland managed in a traditional coppice-with-standards system. The woodland is a variant of the calcareous ash/wych elm stand-type, with pedunculate oak (Quercus robur), and ash (Fraxinus excelsior) the dominant canopy trees throughout, and with scattered concentrations of wych elm (Ulmus glabra). Ancient woodland indicators include small-leaved lime (Tilia cordata), and wild service tree (Sorbus torminalis), both of which are locally common. Plants of particular interest include bird's nest orchid (Neottia nidus-avis), greater butterfly orchid (Platanthera chlorantha) and the very rare Red Data Book species purple gromwell (Lithospermum purpurocaeruleum).

Part of the land designated as Aller and Beer Woods SSSI is owned by the Ministry of Defence.

Nearby is the Aller Hill SSSI.
