= Hundred of Somerton =

Historical Hundred of Somerset, England

Somerton Hundred
- Area
- 25,450 acres (10,300 ha)
- Status: Hundred
  - HQ: Somerton
- Subdivisions
  - Type: Parishes
  - Units: Aller, West Camel, Charlton Adam, Charlton Mackrell, Kingston, East Lydford, Somerton, Long Sutton, and Yeovilton

The Hundred of Somerton is one of the 40 historical Hundreds in the ceremonial county of Somerset, England, dating from before the Norman conquest during the Anglo-Saxon era although exact dates are unknown. Each hundred had a 'fyrd', which acted as the local defence force and a court which was responsible for the maintenance of the frankpledge system. They also formed a unit for the collection of taxes. The role of the hundred court was described in the Dooms (laws) of King Edgar. The name of the hundred was normally that of its meeting-place.

Somerton Hundred originated as a Royal Estate before the Norman Conquest and may have included the parishes later included in the Pitney Hundred.

The Hundred of Somerton consisted of the ancient parishes of: Aller, West Camel, Charlton Adam, Charlton Mackrell, Kingston, East Lydford, Somerton, Long Sutton, and Yeovilton. It covered an area of 25,450 acres (10,300 ha).

The importance of the hundred courts declined from the seventeenth century. By the 19th century several different single-purpose subdivisions of counties, such as poor law unions, sanitary districts, and highway districts sprang up, filling the administrative role previously played by parishes and hundreds. Although the Hundreds have never been formally abolished, their functions ended with the establishment of county courts in 1867 and the introduction of districts by the Local Government Act 1894.
