= Church of the Holy Cross, Babcary =

Church in Somerset, England

Church of the Holy Cross
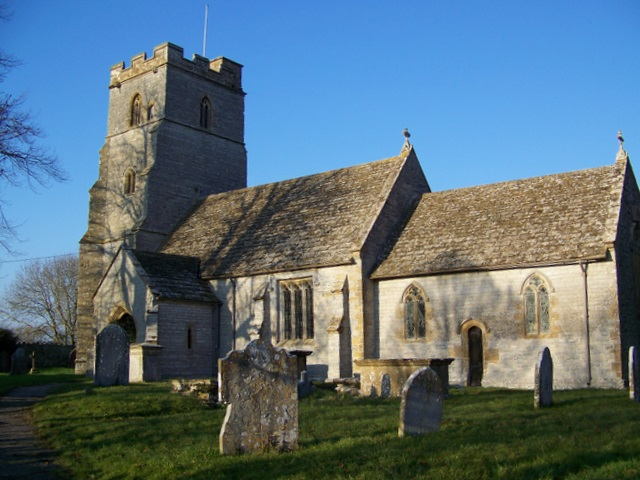

- Location within Somerset
- 51.0566°N 2.6271°W
- Location: Babcary, Somerset, England

History
- Built: 14th century

Listed Building – Grade II*
- Official name: Church of the Holy Cross
- Designated: 17 April 1959
- Reference no.: 1277940

The Anglican Church of the Holy Cross in Babcary, Somerset, England, was built in the 14th century. It is a Grade II* listed building.

== History ==
The Church of the Holy Cross had its origins before the Norman Conquest, with a church being recorded in 1200. The fabric dates from the 14th and 15th centuries with the chancel and north aisle being added in the 19th century by Benjamin Ferrey in 1875–76. Further restoration was undertaken in the 1950s.

In 1764 James Woodforde, the author of The Diary of a Country Parson, was the curate at Babcary. He records playing (and winning) a game of "fives" against the church wall.

The parish is part of the Six Pilgrims benefice within the Diocese of Bath and Wells.

== Architecture ==
The stone building has stone slate roofs. It consists of a two-bay chancel and three-bay nave with a north aisle. The three-stage tower is supported by corner buttresses. The tower contains six bells, the tenor wieghing 12cwt, the oldest (No.3) is dated 1611 and one bell dating from 1753 was made by Thomas Bilbie of the Bilbie family.

Inside the church are a 14th-century font and octagonal pulpit dating from 1632.

== See also ==
- List of ecclesiastical parishes in the Diocese of Bath and Wells
