= Church of St Michael and All Angels, Somerton =

Church in Somerset, England

Church of St Michael and All Angels
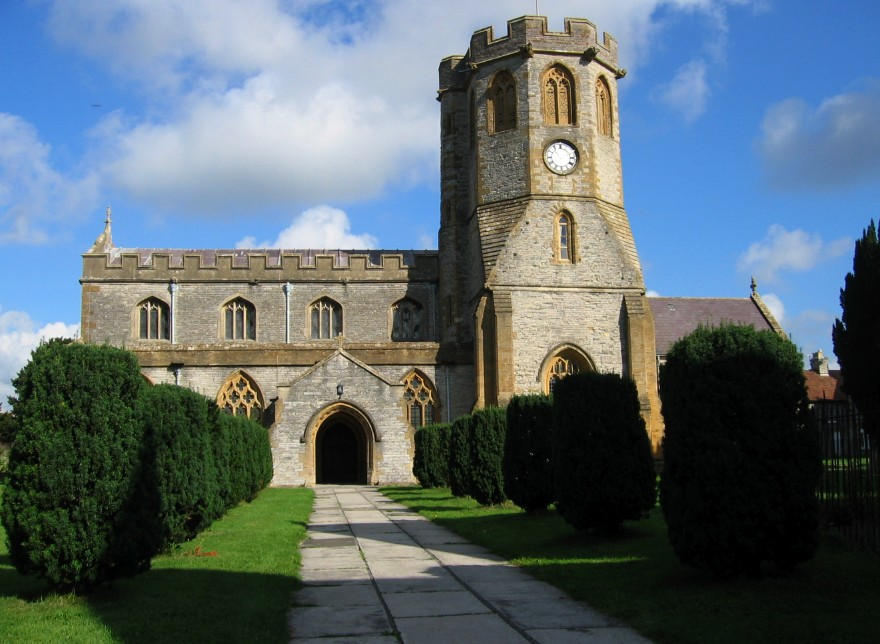

- Location within Somerset
- 51°03′16″N 2°43′37″W
- Location: Somerton, Somerset, England

History
- Built: 13th century

Listed Building – Grade I
- Designated: 17 April 1959
- Reference no.: 1056695

The Church of St Michael and All Angels in Somerton, Somerset, England dates from the 13th century and has been designated as a Grade I listed building.

== History ==
The chapel began as a daughter church of Queen Camel and belonged to the Crown, as did most in the area until the time of Empress Maud. However, the growth of Somerton in the 12th century likely pressured them to try to improve the inferior status of their church. The Empress allowed them a grant and therefore c. 1140, the church was given burial rights, making it, in its turn, a mother church, with the vicar being appointed by the monks of Muchelney Abbey.

The Anglican Church underwent a major reshaping in the mid 15th century, and further restoration in 1889. It is built of local lias stone cut and squared, with Hamstone dressing.

It is notable for a carved roof, with dragons (Wyverns - the symbol for the county of Somerset; Somerton was at one time the county town), angels, and two small cider barrels purportedly carved by the monks of Muchelney Abbey. Sir John Betjeman was also inspired by an inscription on the candelabra. The church is quite plain on the outside but inside is one of the finest wooden carved roofs in the county. It is shallow pitched with massive, richly decorated tie beams and short king posts. The whole area of the roof is divided into square carved panels set in the framework of the structural timbers which are decorated with carved bosses where they intersect. There are 640 panels each carved with the same quatrefoil design. In the triangular spaces above each beam are twenty-two dragons facing each other in pairs. It is said there are bullet holes in the timbers, caused by soldiers who camped in the church in 1646 before the Battle of Langport. The 17th century pulpit and altar table are Jacobean woodwork.

== Incumbents ==
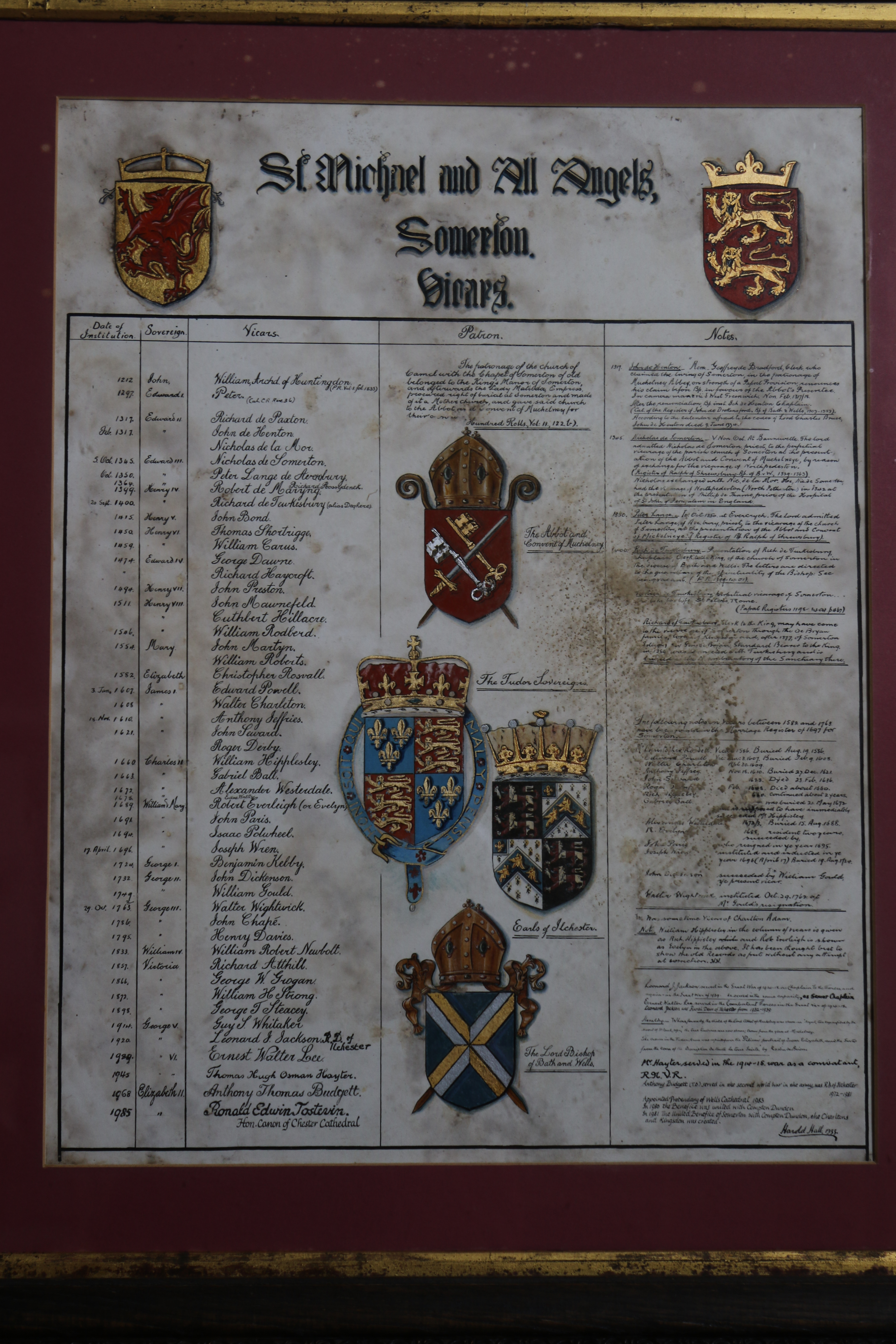
List of vicars from 1212 to 1985

- 1212 William de Cornhill, Archdeacon of Huntingdon
- 1297 Peter
- 1317 Richard de Paxton
- 1317 John de Henton
- ???? Nicholas de la Mor
- 1345 Nicholas de Somerton
- 1350 Peter Lange de Sterebury
- 1399 Robert de Maryng
- 1400 Richard de Tewkesbury
- 1415 John Bond
- 1450 Thomas Shortrigge
- 1459 William Carus
- 1474 George Dawne
- ???? Richard Haycroft
- 1494 John Preston
- 1511 John Mawnefeld
- ???? Cuthbert Hillacre
- 1546 William Rodbert
- 1554 John Martyn
- 1561 William Roberts
- 1582 Christopher Roswall
- 1607 Edward Powell
- 1608 Walter Charleton
- 1610 Anthony Jeffries
- 1621 John Seward
- ???? Roger Derby
- 1660 William (or Richard) Hipplesley
- 1663 Gabriel Ball
- 1672 Alexander Westerdale
- 1678 Edward Walter
- 1689 Robert Everleigh
- 1891 John Paris
- 1694 Isaac Polwheel
- 1696 Joseph Wren
- 1724 Benjamin Kebly
- 1732 John Dickenson
- 1749 William Gould
- 1763 Walter Wightwick
- 1786 John Chape
- 1795 Henry Davies
- 1833 William Robert Newbolt
- 1857 Richard Atthill
- 1866 George W. Grogan
- 1872 William H. Strong
- 1898 George T. Steacey
- 1914 Guy S. Whitaker
- 1920 Leonard J. Jackson
- 1939 Ernest Walter Lee
- 1945 Thomas Hugh Osman Hayter
- 1968 Anthony Thomas Budgett
- 1985 Ronald Edwin Tostevin
- 1992 Charles Adrian Hadley
- 2006 Alan Jeffrey Symonds

== See also ==
- List of Grade I listed buildings in South Somerset
- List of towers in Somerset
- List of ecclesiastical parishes in the Diocese of Bath and Wells
