= Babcary Meadows =

Biological site in Somerset, UK

- Site of Special Scientific Interest
- Location within Somerset
- Location of Babcary Meadows.
- Area of search: Somerset
- Grid reference: ST567293
- Coordinates: 51.06139°N 2.61925°W
- Interest: Biological
- Area: 13.6 hectares (0.136 km^{2}; 0.053 sq mi)
- Notification date: 1988

Babcary Meadows (grid reference ST567293) is a 13.6 hectares (34 acres) biological Site of Special Scientific Interest north of Babcary in Somerset, notified in 1988.

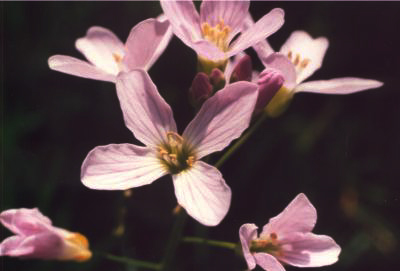
Cuckoo Flower

Babcary Meadows is one of the last remaining areas of traditionally managed unimproved neutral grassland in south Somerset and contains a rich variety of herbs.

The site is positioned to the north of the River Cary at an altitude of 30 metres (98 ft) on flat and gently sloping ground. The plant community contains a very high proportion of herbaceous species. Areas immediately adjacent to the river bank are frequently waterlogged and contain numerous tussocks of Soft rush (Juncus effusus). Associated plants include Meadowsweet (Filipendula ulmaria), Cuckoo flower (Cardamine pratensis) and Common fleabane (Pulicaria dysenterica).

Over two hundred species of flora have been recorded on the 12 hectares (30 acres) Somerset Wildlife Trust reserve, fourteen of which are classified 'notable species' in Somerset, and six of which are orchids. Badgers (Meles meles) and Roe deer (Capreolus capreolus) frequent the reserve and it is probable that Otters (Lutra lutra) use the river corridor. The site was purchased by the trust following grant assistance from South Somerset Council.
