= Jenner baronets =

Extinct baronetcy in the Baronetage of the United Kingdom

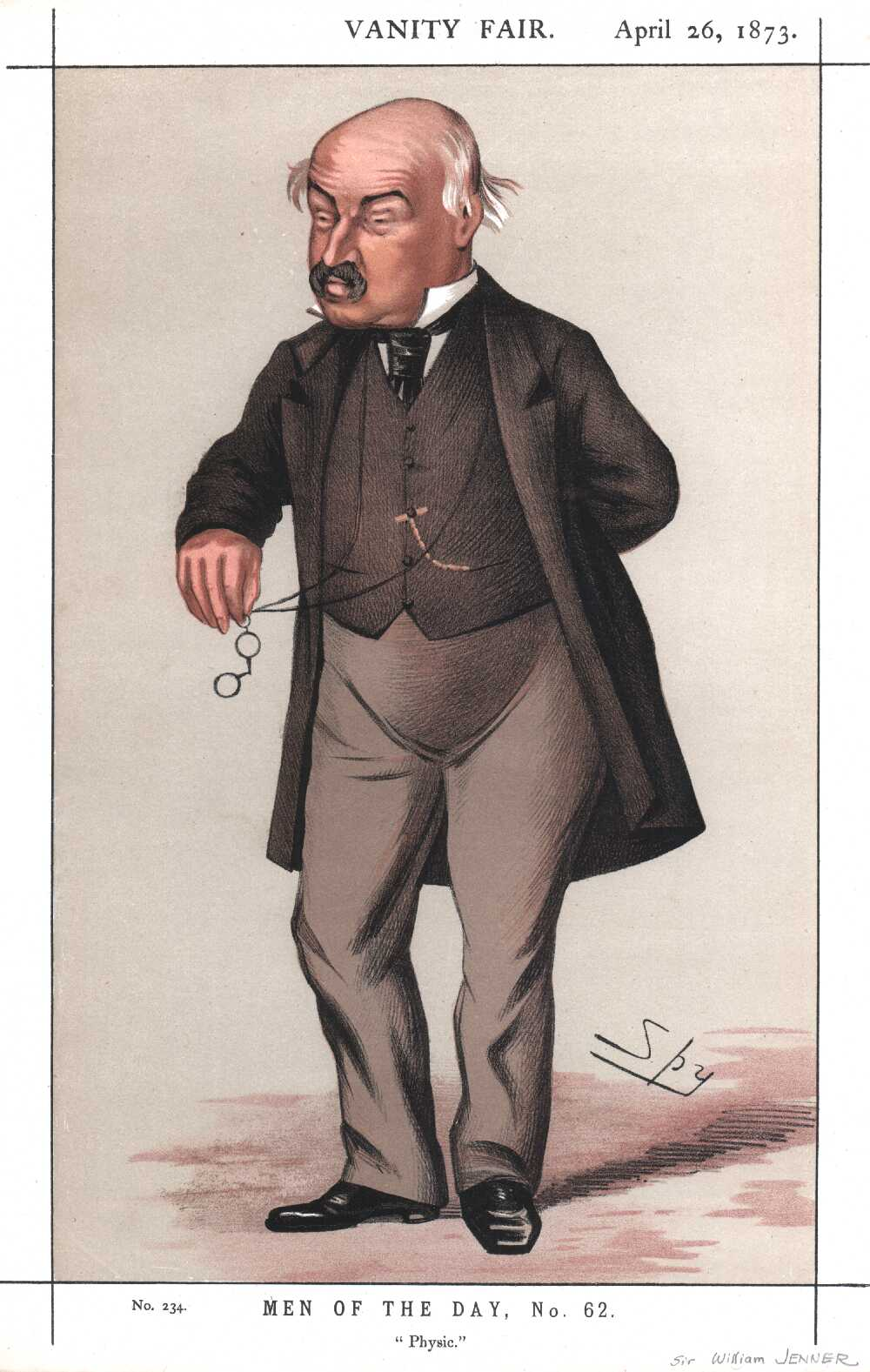
"Physic": Sir William Jenner as caricatured by Spy (Leslie Ward) in Vanity Fair, April 1873

The Jenner Baronetcy, of Harley Street, Cavendish Square, in the Parish of St Marylebone and County of Middlesex, was a title in the Baronetage of the United Kingdom. It was created on 25 February 1868 for the physician William Jenner. The title became extinct on the death of the third Baronet in 1954.

== Jenner baronets, of Harley Street (1868) ==
- Sir William Jenner, 1st Baronet (1815–1898)
- Sir Walter Kentish Williams Jenner, 2nd Baronet (1860–1948)
- Sir Albert Victor Jenner, 3rd Baronet (1862–1954)

Coat of arms of Jenner baronets
Crest On a mount Vert a lamp of three branches Argent suspended by three chains Or fired Proper. Escutcheon Per chevron Azure and Or in chief two estoiles of the last and in base a serpent nowed proper all within a bordure Ermine. Motto Fide Et Labore
