= John Northover =

Royalist during the English Civil War

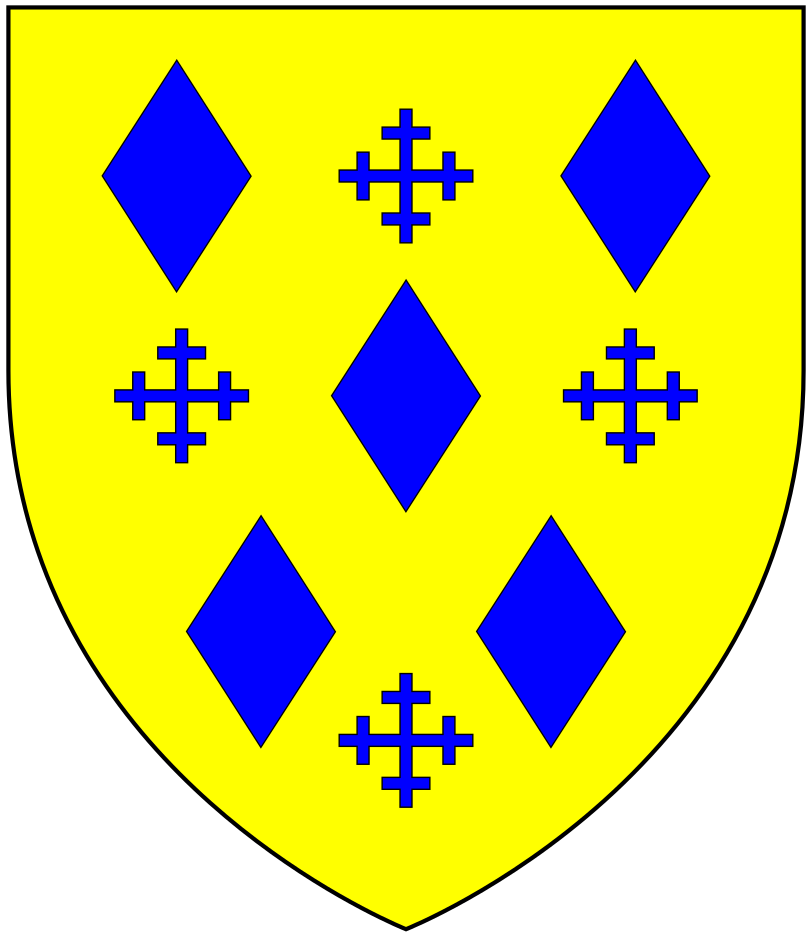
Arms of Northover: Or, five lozenges in saltire azure between four cross-crosslets of the second

John Northover (fl. 1646) of Aller Court in the parish of Aller in Somerset, England, was an ardent Royalist during the Civil War.

== Origins ==
Little is recorded of his ancestry. In 1565 William Northover acquired a lease of Aller Court, the manor house of Aller, where his descendants resided until the 17th century, after which the freehold was acquired by the Stawell family. In 1608 the Northover family also acquired Chantry Farm of 252 acres in the parish of Aller, which they had occupied as tenants since about 1577. As the lord of the manor was non-resident, the Northover family became the most important and influential local land-owning family.

In May 1614 a coat of arms was granted to the head of the Northover family of Aller Court in the County of Somerset, by William Camden, Clarienceaux herald as follows: Or, five lozenges in saltire azure between four cross-crosslets of the second

== Career ==
=== Civil War ===
During the Commonwealth John Northover was accused "of having supplied two men for the King's army and, on a Sunday evening after church, of inciting the parishioners to join Goring's forces (in May 1645) at the Siege of Taunton". After the Battle of Langport on 9 July 1645 the royalist army fled to Bridgwater across Aller Moor, and made a brief stand at Aller Great Drove, where they were routed by Parliamentary forces. Several horses "were lost in the ditches...and the riders got into the meadows hoping to escape, but could not". John Northover was accused of having laid a bridge over a watercourse to assist their escape. It was at Aller that Sir Thomas Fairfax slept the night following the battle, and the next day marched to Bridgwater.

=== Fined for delinquency ===
On 9 February 1646 he was pardoned and fined by Parliament for his support of the Royalists, as is recorded in the Journals of the House of Commons as follows:

"Resolved, etc, That the House doth accept of the fine of one hundred thirty-four pounds nine shillings sixpence, of John Northover, of Aller in the County of Sommersett, Gentleman, for his delinquency: his offence is, that he voluntarily contributed to the maintenance of the forces raised against the Parliament: his estate, for eighty years to come, per annum, forty pounds; for three lives, per annum, four pounds nine shillings threepence; for life, per annum, three pounds fourteen shillings: for which his fine, at a sixth, is as aforefaid. An ordinance for granting a pardon unto John Northover, of Aller in the county of Somersett, Gentleman, for his delinquency, and for the discharge of the sequestration of his estate, was this day read; and, upon the question, passed; and ordered to be sent to the Lords for their concurrence".
