= Sir William Jenner, 1st Baronet =

British Baronet, physician and neurologist

Sir William Jenner Bt GCB QHP FRS FRCP
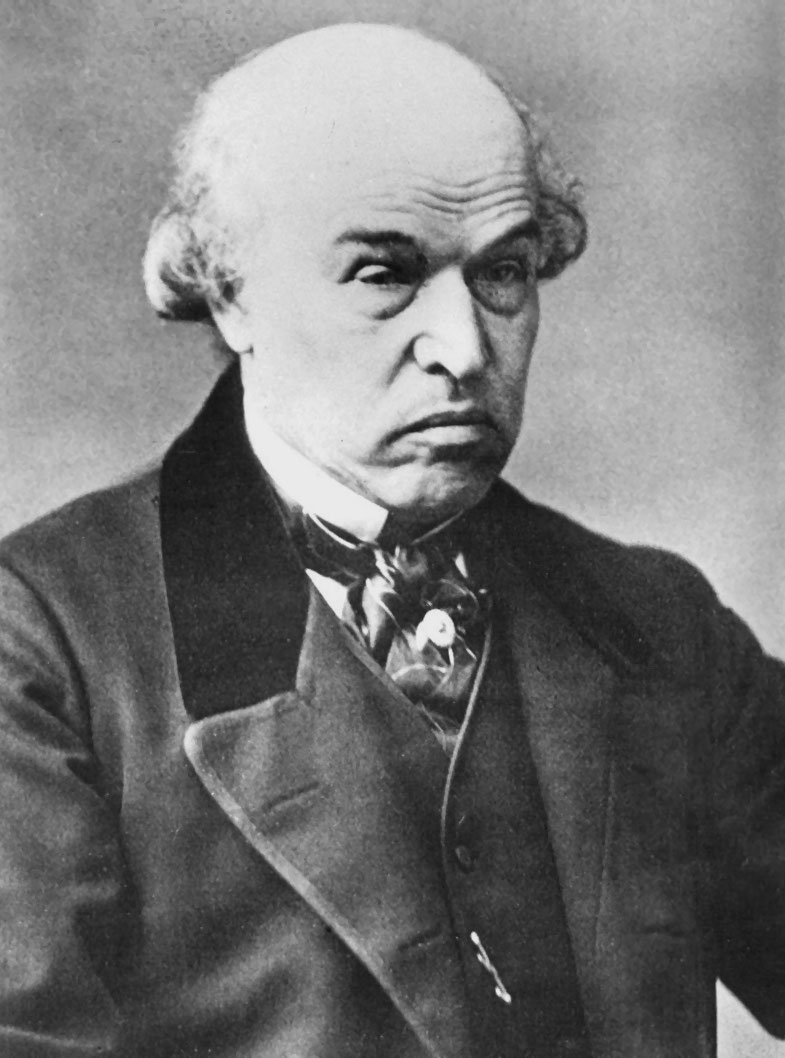

Physician in Ordinary to HM The Queen
- In office 1862–1898

Personal details
- Born: 30 January 1815 Chatham, Kent, England
- Died: 11 December 1898 (aged 83) Bishop's Waltham, Hampshire, England
- Occupation: Physician

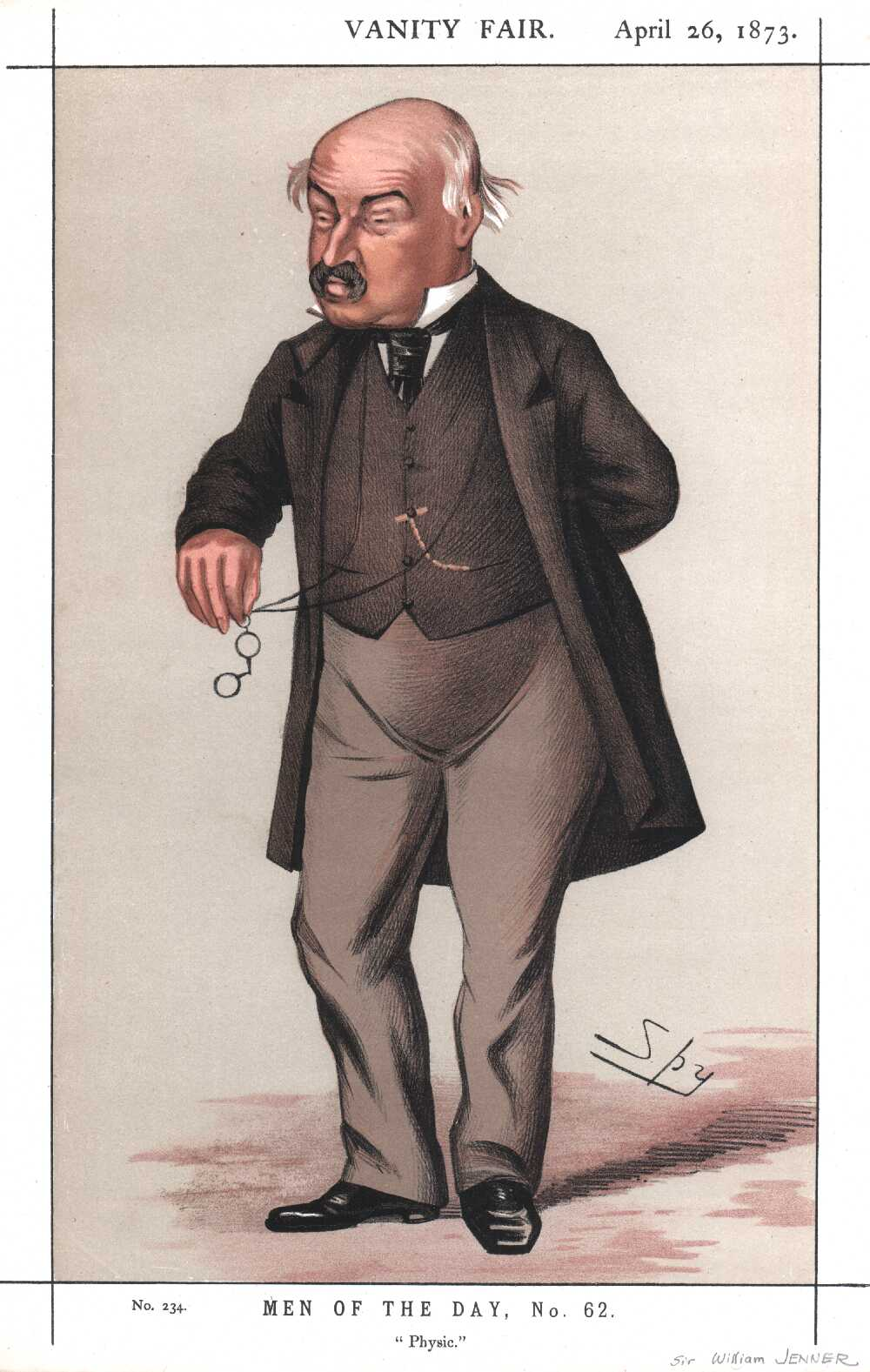
"Physic" Jenner as caricatured by Spy (Leslie Ward) in Vanity Fair, April 1873

Sir William Jenner, 1st Baronet (30 January 1815 – 11 December 1898) was a significant English physician primarily known for having discovered the distinction between typhus and typhoid.

== Biography ==
Jenner was born at Chatham on 30 January 1815, and educated at University College London. He became a Member of the Royal College of Surgeons of England (M.R.C.S.) in 1837, a Fellow of the Royal College of Physicians (F.R.C.P.) in 1852, and in 1844 took the London M.D.

In 1847, he began at the London Fever Hospital investigations into cases of continued fever which enabled him finally to make the distinction between typhus and typhoid on which his reputation as a pathologist principally rests, publishing his book "On the Identity or Non-Identity of Typhoid and Typhus Fever" in 1850. In 1849, he was appointed professor of pathological anatomy at University College, and also assistant physician to University College Hospital, where he afterwards became physician (1854–1876) and consulting physician (1879), besides holding similar appointments at other hospitals. He was also successively Holme Professor of Clinical Medicine and professor of the principles and practice of medicine at University College London.

He was elected President of the Epidemiological Society in 1866–1868, of the Pathological Society in 1873–1875 and of the Clinical Society in 1875. He was president of the Royal College of Physicians from 1881 to 1888 where he had delivered the Goulstonian Lectures in 1853. He was elected a Fellow of the Royal Society (F.R.S.) in 1864 and received honorary degrees from the University of Oxford, University of Cambridge, and University of Edinburgh. In 1861, he was appointed Physician Extraordinary (Q.H.P.), and in 1862 Physician in Ordinary, to Queen Victoria, and in 1863 Physician in Ordinary to the Prince of Wales; he attended both the Prince Consort and the prince of Wales in their attacks of typhoid fever. In 1868, he was created a baronet.

As a consultant, Sir William Jenner had a great reputation, and he left a large fortune when he died, at Bishops Waltham, Hants, on 11 December 1898, having then retired from practice for eight years owing to failing health. He had married in 1858 Adela Lucy Leman, the daughter of Stephen Adey, with whom he had five sons and a daughter. His son, Leopold, was a decorated Army officer of the First World War.

Coat of arms of Sir William Jenner, 1st Baronet
Crest On a mount Vert a lamp of three branches Argent suspended by three chains Or fired Proper. Escutcheon Per chevron Azure and Or in chief two estoiles of the last and in base a serpent nowed proper all within a bordure Ermine. Motto Fide Et Labore

== See also ==
- Jenner baronets

Baronetage of the United Kingdom
New creation	Baronet (of Harley Street); 1868–1898	Succeeded by Walter Kentish Williams Jenner
