= Charlton Mackrell =

Village in England

Coordinates: 51.0538°N 2.6790°W

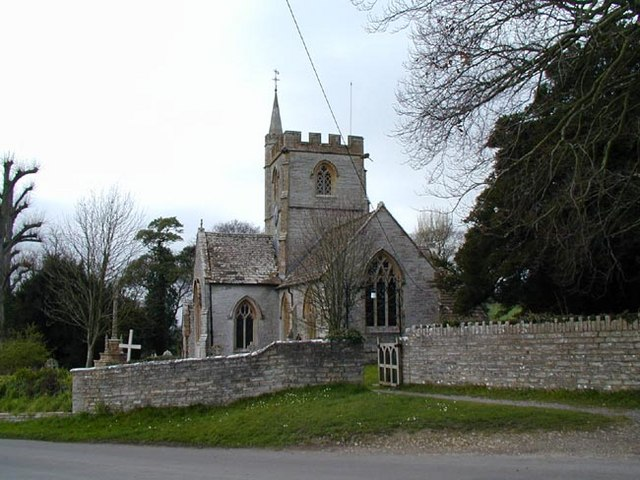
- Parish church

- Location within Somerset
- Population: 1,020 (2014)
- OS grid reference: ST525285
- Civil parish: The Charltons
- Unitary authority: Somerset
- Ceremonial county: Somerset
- Region: South West
- Country: England
- Sovereign state: United Kingdom
- Post town: Somerton
- Postcode district: TA11 6
- Dialling code: 01458
- Police: Avon and Somerset
- Fire: Devon and Somerset
- Ambulance: South Western
- UK Parliament: Glastonbury and Somerton

Charlton Mackrell is a village and former civil parish, now in the parish of The Charltons, in the Somerset district, in the ceremonial county of Somerset, England, situated 3 miles (5 km) east of Somerton. The village has a population of 1,020.

The parish consists of two villages, Charlton Mackrell and Charlton Adam. Both villages have approximately similar populations. There are also small settlements at Lytes Cary, Cary Fitzpaine (east of the A37 Fosse Way), and West Charlton. West Charlton is the shrunken remains of the original village of Charlton Mackrell.

== History ==
The Fosse Way runs through the parish, and Roman villa sites associated with it have been found at Windmill Hill. The parishes of Charlton Adam and Charlton Mackrell were part of the hundred of Somerton.

In the 16th century, two medieval fields were divided, which delayed inclosure until the 18th century, leading to the current patchwork of fields.

The Charltons have been home to several of the ancestors of politicians in the United States of America. Henry Adams, of nearby Barton St David, and Edith Squire of Charlton-Mackrell were married in the parish church in 1609, and they were the ancestors of Presidents John Adams, John Quincy Adams, and Calvin Coolidge, as well as of Samuel Adams, who also signed the Declaration of Independence, while Presidents Millard Fillmore and William Howard Taft were descendants of her two sisters Ann and Margaret.

Around 1800, Kingweston resident William Dickinson purchased the manor, and his family owned it until 1930.

A railway station served the village as part of the Great Western Railway from 1905 to 1962.

The village was immortalised in song by Adge Cutler in 1968 with the composition "The Charlton Mackrell Jug Band".

== Governance ==
The parish council has responsibility for local issues, including setting an annual precept (local rate) to cover the council's operating costs and producing annual accounts for public scrutiny. The parish council evaluates local planning applications and works with the local police, district council officers, and neighbourhood watch groups on matters of crime, security, and traffic. The parish council's role also includes initiating projects for the maintenance and repair of parish facilities, as well as consulting with the district council on the maintenance, repair, and improvement of highways, drainage, footpaths, public transport, and street cleaning. Conservation matters (including trees and listed buildings) and environmental issues are also the responsibility of the council.

The civil parish was renamed from Charlton Mackrell to The Charltons on 13 March 2014.

For local government purposes, since 1 April 2023, the parish comes under the unitary authority of Somerset Council. Prior to this, it was part of the non-metropolitan district of South Somerset (established under the Local Government Act 1972). It was part of Langport Rural District before 1974.

It is also part of the Glastonbury and Somerton county constituency represented in the House of Commons of the Parliament of the United Kingdom. It elects one Member of Parliament (MP) by the first-past-the-post system of election.

=== Civil parish ===
On 24 March 1887 part of the parish of Charlton Adam was merged with Charlton Mackrell, and on 1 January 2015 the merged parish was renamed "The Charltons".

In 1881 the parish of Charlton Mackrell (prior to the merge) had a population of 290.

== Geography ==
Just outside the village to the south-west, near the main Langport and Castle Cary Railway line, is the 14 acres (5.7 ha) Green Down Nature Reserve run by the Somerset Wildlife Trust. It is on the side of Windmill Hill and provides a habitat for a range of species, including the largest number of large blue butterflies anywhere in the world. At the eastern end of the reserve is a Powder House, which was used by the Great Western Railway to store dynamite used in the construction of the Somerton Tunnel from 1903 to 1905.

== Landmarks ==
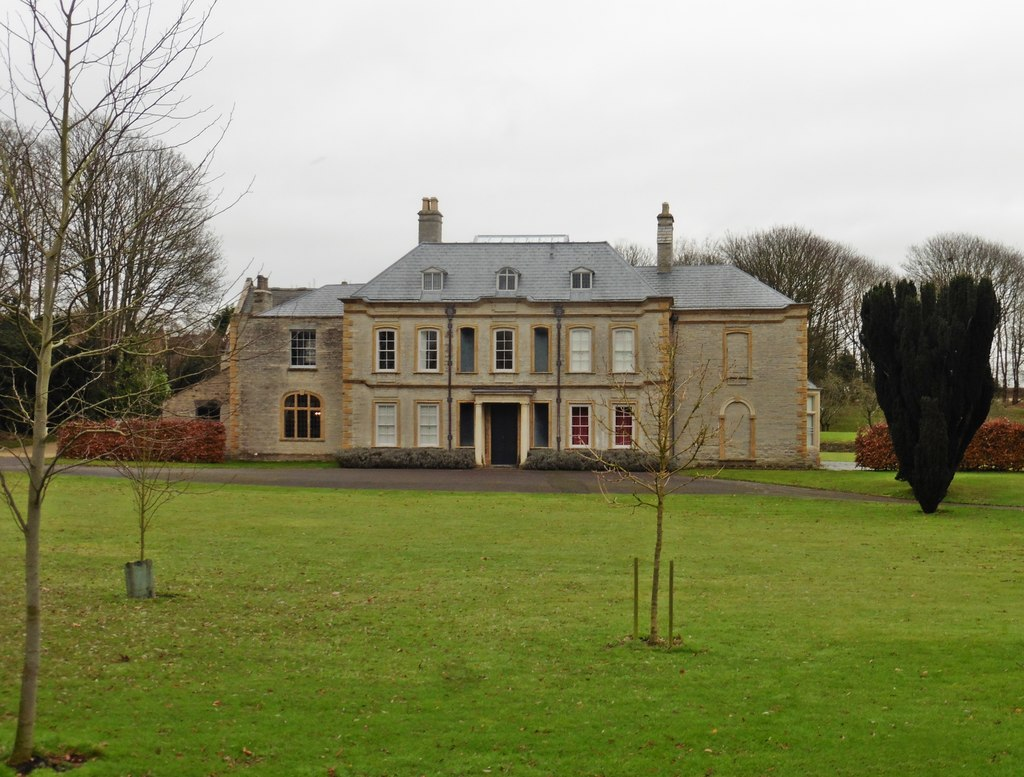
Charlton House, 2017

The Abbey of Charlton Adam is a small country house which dates from the 16th century. The house takes its name from the fact that it was the site of the Chantry Chapel of the Holy Spirit, founded in 1237, of which some fragments may be incorporated. The interiors contain some Elizabethan panelling and reuse earlier bits and pieces. It has been designated by English Heritage as a Grade I listed building.

Lytes Cary is larger and has parts which date from the 14th century. A Tudor great hall was added in the mid-15th century, and a great chamber and other rooms were added in 1533. Other rooms and ranges were added until the Lytes family sold the manor in the mid-18th century. It is now owned by the National Trust and is also Grade I listed.

Charlton House is dated as being built in 1726 by Thomas Lyte on the site of an earlier building. The Court was built in 1792. Both are grade II* listed.

== Religious sites ==
The Church of St Mary in West Charlton dates from the 13th century.

The Church of St Peter and St Paul, on Church Hill, is slightly more recent.
