= Somerton, Somerset =

Town in Somerset, England

Coordinates: 51.0535°N 2.7361°W

Somerton
- Market Place, Somerton

- Location within Somerset
- Population: 5,484 (Parish, 2021)
- OS grid reference: ST485285
- Civil parish: Somerton
- Unitary authority: Somerset
- Ceremonial county: Somerset
- Region: South West
- Country: England
- Sovereign state: United Kingdom
- Post town: Somerton
- Postcode district: TA11
- Dialling code: 01458
- Police: Avon and Somerset
- Fire: Devon and Somerset
- Ambulance: South Western
- UK Parliament: Glastonbury and Somerton
- Website: www.somerton.co.uk

Somerton (/ˈsʌmərtən/ SUM-ər-tən) is a town and civil parish in the English county of Somerset, situated on the River Cary, approximately 8.8 miles (14.2 km) north-west of Yeovil. The parish, which includes the hamlets of Etsome, Hurcot, Catsgore, and Catcombe, had a population of 5,484 at the 2021 census.

Somerton gave its name to the county and was briefly the county town around the start of the 14th century. Around 900, it was possibly the capital of Wessex. It has held a weekly market since the Middle Ages, and the main square with its market cross is today popular with visitors.

Archaeological remains at Somerton provide evidence of an Iron Age Celtic settlement. The discovery of a high-status cemetery in 2019 suggests that these local people adopted a more Roman lifestyle. During the Anglo-Saxon era, Somerton was an important political and commercial centre. After the Norman conquest of England the importance of the town declined, despite being the county town of Somerset in the late thirteenth century and early fourteenth century. Somerton was a market town in the Middle Ages, the economy of which was supported by transport systems using the River Parrett, and later rail transport via the Great Western Railway, and by light industries including glove making and gypsum mining.

In the centre of Somerton the wide market square with its octagonal roofed market cross is surrounded by old houses, and close by is the 13th-century Church of St Michael and All Angels. Somerton also had links with Muchelney Abbey in the Middle Ages. The BBC drama The Monocled Mutineer was filmed in Somerton from 1985 to 1986.

== History ==
Archaeological evidence uncovered in 2019 indicates the existence of an Iron Age Celtic settlement, which predates any written records of the area. The grave goods found suggest the local population were of a high status and adopted a Roman lifestyle, with the older and newer graves showing marked differences in burial customs.

The earliest written reference to the town is in the Anglo-Saxon Chronicle, which records that in 733 the King of Wessex, Æthelheard, lost control of Somerton to Æthelbald, King of Mercia. Somerton was the site of the 949 meeting of the witan, a form of Anglo-Saxon parliament. The town returned to West Saxon royal control in the ninth century, and it was listed in Domesday Book of 1086 as Somertone. The name may come from Old English for sea-lake enclosure, summer town or summer farmstead. The Somerton name was extended to the people in the area it controlled, and this area became known as Somerset, although Somerton soon ceased to be the most important settlement and never grew into a large town. The parish was the largest in the Hundred of Somerton. It was briefly the county town of Somerset from the late thirteenth century into the early fourteenth century. A building referred to as Somerset castle is believed to have been built around 1280 as a county gaol, with a visitor in 1579 describing the remaining portion as "an old tower embattled about castle-like". It was owned by Sir Ralph Cromwell between 1423 and 1433. Details are vague and visible remains have vanished, so its status as a castle and its very existence is in doubt, with one writer, D.J.C. King, feeling that people were confusing it with Somerton Castle in Lincolnshire.

The Abbots of Muchelney Abbey held the rectorship of the parish church of Somerton during the Middle Ages. They built a tithe barn to house the tithes of crops and produce paid by the parish to the town's rector. The abbey was dissolved in 1539 during the English Reformation and the tithes and the tithe barn passed into the ownership of Bristol Cathedral. In the 20th century the barn was converted into private housing.

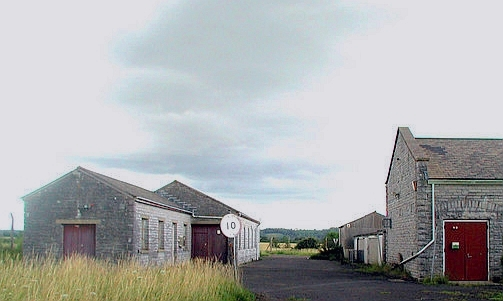
Disused radio station built by the Marconi Company around 1925

Glove making was a major industry in the town in the early 19th century, along with the production of rope and twine. The Somerton Brewery, owned by a local landowner named Thomas Templeman, was first recorded under the Tithe Apportionment Act 1841. The brewery became a large producer in Somerset until its final closure around 1935. Before the National Insurance and the Health Service was introduced, Somerton Men's Club acted as a local provident society within the area. Gypsum was extracted by hand at the Hurcott open-cast mine from the Victorian era up until it closed down in 1953. In 1906, a railway station opened on the Castle Cary Cut-Off which was built by the Great Western Railway. Whilst the line still remains in use, the station was closed in 1962. When the Marconi Company built the radio stations known as the Imperial Wireless Chain for the Post Office during 1925–26, they also established their own transmitting station at Dorchester with a receiving station 30 miles (48 km) away at Somerton.

Somerton was hit by four Luftwaffe bombs on the morning of 29 September 1942 during the Second World War. The bombs were aimed at the Cow & Gate milk factory, which was largely destroyed. Ten nearby houses were badly damaged. Nine people were killed and thirty-seven injured. A memorial at the dairy site commemorates those killed.

Somerton also is home to large properties, such as The Lynch Country House, a grade II listed building, built in 1812, and St Michael's and All Angels Church.

== Governance ==
There are two tiers of local government covering Somerton, at parish (town) and unitary authority level: Somerton Town Council and Somerset Council. The town council is based at Edgar Hall at 8 Cary Court, which forms part of the Bancombe Road industrial estate on the western edge of the town.

For national elections, the town forms part of the Glastonbury and Somerton constituency.

In October 2009 eleven of the town councillors resigned en masse, citing excessive criticism from local residents and in particular criticism from a hostile local weblog. In February 2012 the external auditor appointed by the Audit Commission published a critical "Report in the Public Interest" regarding the activities of Somerton Town Council in the fiscal year 2008 to 2009.

=== Administrative history ===
Somerton was an ancient parish, which gave its name to the wider Somerton hundred of Somerset. In the early 14th century Somerton was described and taxed as a borough, but its borough status did not endure.

When elected parish and district councils were established in 1894, Somerton was given a parish council and included in the Langport Rural District. Langport Rural District was abolished in 1974 under the Local Government Act 1972, with its area becoming part of the new Yeovil district. The Yeovil district was renamed South Somerset in 1985.

South Somerset was abolished in 2023. Somerset County Council then took over district-level functions across its area, making it a unitary authority, and was renamed Somerset Council. Since the 1974 reforms, parish councils have had the right to declare their parishes to be a town and take the title of town council. Somerton Parish Council exercised this right, becoming Somerton Town Council.

== Geography ==
Somerton is situated on a plateau, above and to the south of the deep valley of the River Cary. The river flows west and then north through the Somerton Moor and then into King's Sedgemoor Drain on the Somerset Levels eventually joining the River Parrett near Bridgwater. The town is 116 miles (187 km) from London, 28 miles (45 km) south from Bristol and 9 miles (14 km) north-west from Yeovil, just off the Dorset border. Somerton's hamlets include Etsome, Hurcot, Lower Somerton, Littleton and Midney. Great Breach Wood is a biological Site of Special Scientific Interest (SSSI) and is situated just 1.4 miles (2.3 km) north-east from Somerton, near the hamlet of Littleton.

Somerton's climate is typical of the climate of south-west England which is usually cool winters with warmer summers and precipitation all year round, with more rain experienced in winter.

== Demography ==
Somerton parish had a population of nearly 5,500 as of 2021. In the 1801 census the population of the town was 1,145 and the first half of the 19th century saw strong growth (reflecting that seen elsewhere in England during this period), with the population rising to 2,140 in 1851. However it then began to fall, starting with a significant drop to 1,917 by the 1861 census. The population steadily fell until 1921 before steadily rising thereafter. It was not until 1961 that the population of Somerton had risen above what it had been in 1851. The population has since continued to increase steadily.

Census population of Somerton parish
Census	Population	Female	Male	Households	Source
2001	4,509	2,404	2,105	1,992	
2011	4,697	2,485	2,212	2,144	
2021	5,484	2,911	2,573	2,505	

== Economy ==
A weekly market has been held in Somerton for much of its history. The cloth industry dominated the town's market from the 17th century until the 20th century, when agriculture took over as the leading industry. Some light industries and services, such as garage repair, physiotherapy, water treatment, and builders and decorators, are located in the business park on Bancombe Road.

== Landmarks ==
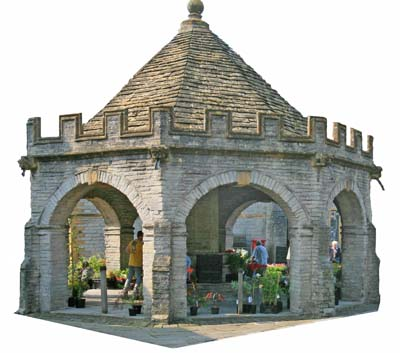
The Butter Cross which was rebuilt in 1673

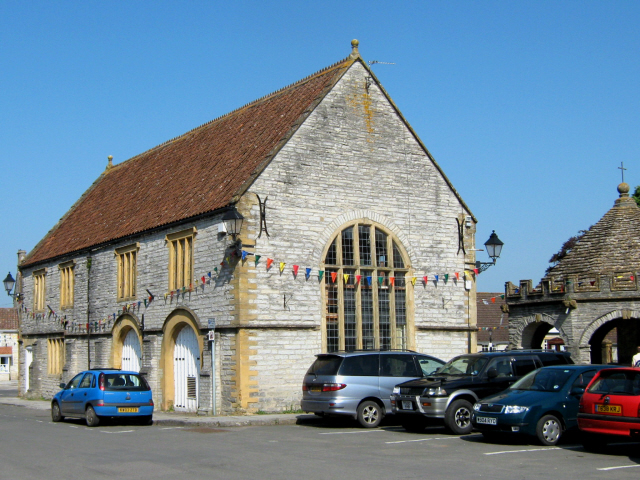
The Old Town Hall which dates to circa 1688

The main square, Market Place, with its market cross is today an attractive location for visitors. Market crosses have stood in the square since before 1390; the present Butter Cross, a roofed market cross, was rebuilt in 1673 and is Somerton's most noted feature. The structure was the property of the Earls of Ilchester, who sold it to the town in 1916. It is a Scheduled Ancient Monument. Next to the Butter Cross stands the Old Town Hall. Bordering the square are the church and the Lady Smith Memorial Hall, also known as the Parish Rooms, built in 1902 and named after Frances (née Pinney), the late wife of Sir John Smith, who had died in 1895. The 17th-century Market House is now a restaurant. The Red Lion was opened by the Earl of Ilchester in 1768 as a model coaching inn. It closed in 1995; after a period of neglect it has been redeveloped as town houses.

From the early 1980s onwards projects aiming at improving Somerton for film industry purposes have been undertaken. The market square was heavily revamped, creating a central parking area with easy access to the local amenities. The BBC drama The Monocled Mutineer was filmed in Somerton in 1985 and 1986.

== Somerton Court ==
Somerton Court was originally known as "Somerton Erleigh". The house has had various owners including Edward IV's brother, the Duke of Clarence, and Henry Percy, 6th Earl of Northumberland, who sold the estate in 1530. It passed through a number of hands until 1597 when it was purchased by James Fisher, whose son later rebuilt it in 1641. The court remained in the Fisher family's possession until 1808 when it was sold. Its new owner renamed the house "Somerton Court", and replaced the gabled dormers with Gothic battlements and turrets. The house was later enlarged by the Hall-Stephenson family. During World War II it was occupied by Royal Navy WRENS. In the 1970s it was purchased by a local businessman Stuart Pattemore. In 1987 Somerton Court and the estate of 55 acres (22 ha) and 4 cottages including The Dower House was purchased by Roger Byron-Collins when it was subject to extensive upgrading and extensions. It was resold in 2005. The Dower House was built in the early 19th century. The house now stands in 55 acres (22 ha) grounds.

== Transport ==
Somerton railway station was on the Castle Cary Cut-Off, once part of the Great Western Railway. Although the line still remains in use the station closed to passengers in 1962, and goods in 1964. The nearest station is now Castle Cary. On the outskirts of the town stands the impressive Somerton Viaduct.

The closest main road from Somerton is the A303 road that runs near the town and stretches all the way into northern Hampshire and finally joins the M3 motorway near Basingstoke. The minor B3165 road runs through the town although the road is less commonly used and does not join to the A303 for another 4 miles (6 km). Two B roads, the B3153 and B3165, run through Somerton; the B3165, mentioned earlier, starts in the town and runs southwards to the A372 Langport road. The A372 itself runs south-east to the junction of the A303 and A37 roads at Podimore services. The B3151 is also nearby, connecting Somerton with Street and Glastonbury to the north, and Ilchester to the south, and thus the A303 and A37 as well. The M5 motorway is around 17 miles (27 km) away at junction 23 (Bridgwater).

== Media ==
Local news and television programmes are provided by BBC West and ITV West Country. Television signals are received from the Mendip TV transmitter.

Local radio stations are BBC Radio Somerset, Heart West and Greatest Hits Radio South West (formerly The Breeze).

The town is served by the local newspaper, Somerset County Gazette.

== Religious sites ==
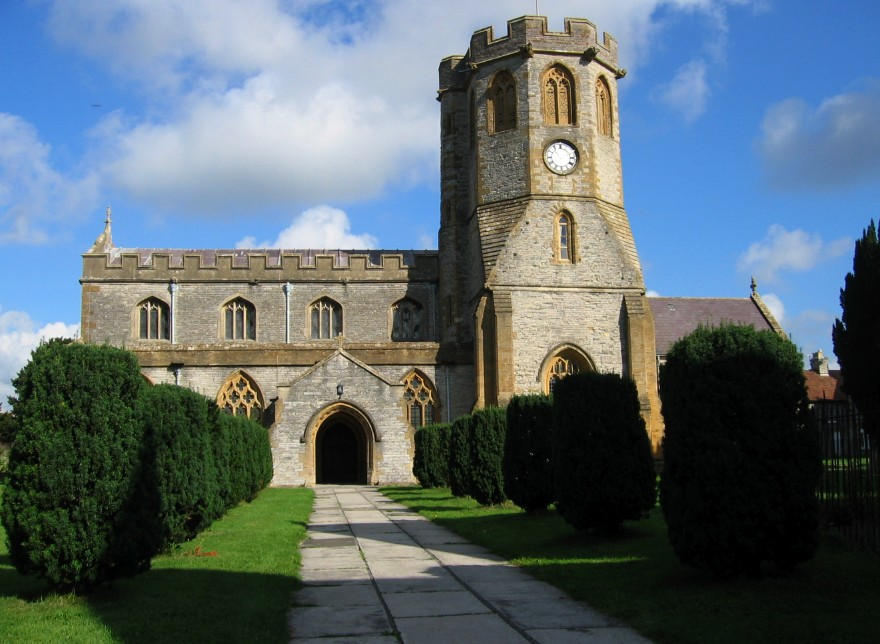
St Michael and All Angels church has origins which date from the 13th century.

The Church of England parish church, St Michael and All Angels, has origins which date from the 13th century, with a major reshaping in the mid 15th century, and further restoration in 1889. It is built of local lias stone cut and squared, with Hamstone dressing. It has been designated by English Heritage as a grade I listed building.

The church is notable for a carved roof, with lions and a small cider barrel purportedly carved by the monks of Muchelney Abbey. Sir John Betjeman was also inspired by an inscription on the candelabra. The church is quite plain on the outside but inside is one of the finest wooden carved roofs in the county. It is shallow pitched with massive, richly decorated tie beams and short king posts. The whole area of the roof is divided into square carved panels set in the framework of the structural timbers which are decorated with carved bosses where they intersect. There are 640 panels each carved with the same quatrefoil design. In the triangular spaces above each beam are dragon-like beasts. It is said there are bullet holes in the timbers, caused by soldiers who camped in the church in 1646 before the Battle of Langport. The 17th century pulpit and altar table are Jacobean woodwork.

There are five other churches in the town, including Methodist and Catholic groups.

== Education ==
A grammar school in Somerton was first founded in the 1570s, and later was endowed as the Somerton Free Grammar School. In 1903, it became Somerton Free Church of England School, before merging with Montclefe in 1963. Monteclefe National School was founded in 1851 by the Pinney family of Somerton Erleigh.

Somerton Infants School and Monteclefe CEVA Junior school merged in September 2014 to form King Ina Academy, with Somerton Roundabout Preschool also amalgamating with the school, with the ultimate aim of having one building for the whole academy. Currently the institution is still based on two sites, however applications have been submitted to the Department of Education to be granted permission to build a new, one-building free school for King Ina Academy on one of three possible sites, all of which are situated in the western outskirts of the town.

== Notable people ==
- Richard Newcourt (died 1679), topographical draughtsman and cartographer.
- Marmaduke Cradock (1660–1716), painter of birds and other animals.
- William Newbolt (1844–1930), Anglican priest and theologian, member of the Oxford Movement
