= Somerset Victoria County History =

The Somerset Victoria County History is an encyclopaedic history of the county of Somerset in England, forming part of the overall Victoria County History of England founded in 1899 in honour of Queen Victoria. With ten volumes published in the series A History of the County of Somerset, the Somerset VCH is among the most substantial of the Victoria County Histories.

== Volumes published ==
=== General volumes ===
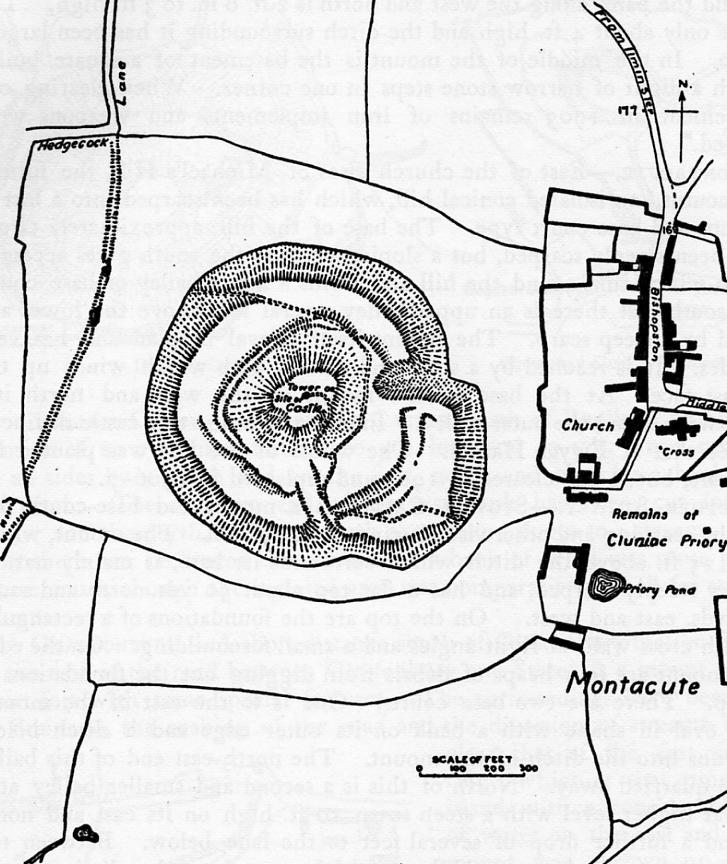
Plan of St Michael's Hill, Montacute, from Volume II (1911)

- Volume I (1906), ed. William Page: the Natural History of the county, with some archaeological material and a chapter on Romano-British Somerset, especially Bath; the Somerset Domesday and the Geld Inquest
- Volume II (1911), ed. William Page: Religious houses, including Wells Cathedral, Bath Abbey and Glastonbury Abbey

=== Topographical volumes ===
- Volume III (1974), ed. R. W. Dunning: Kingsbury (East), Pitney, Somerton and Tintinhull hundreds: Huish Episcopi, Langport, Muchelney, Pitney; Aller, West Camel, Charlton Adam, Charlton Mackrell, Kingsdon, East Lydford, Somerton, Long Sutton, Yeovilton; Ilchester, Kingstone, Montacute, Northover, Sock Dennis, Stoke sub Hamdon, Thorne, Tintinhull
- Volume IV (1978), ed. R. W. Dunning: Crewkerne and South Petherton hundreds and Martock hundred (part): Crewkerne, Hinton St George, Merriott, Misterton, Wayford; Martock; Barrington, Chaffcombe, Chillington, Cricket St Thomas, Cudworth, Dinnington, Dowlish Wake, Knowle St Giles, Lopen, South Petherton, Seavington St Mary, Seavington St Michael, Shepton Beauchamp, Wambrook, Whitestaunton
- Volume V (1985), ed. R. W. Dunning: Williton and Freemanors hundred (part), and Whitley hundred (part): Holford; Bicknoller, Brompton Ralph, Chipstable, Clatworthy, Old Cleeve, Crowcombe, Dodington, Elworthy, Halse, Huish Champflower, Kilton, Kilve, Lilstock, Monksilver, Nettlecombe, East Quantoxhead, West Quantoxhead, Raddington, St Decumans (including Watchet and Williton), Sampford Brett, Stogumber, Nether Stowey
- Volume VI (1992), ed. R. W. Dunning and C. R. Elrington: Andersfield, Cannington, and North Petherton hundreds: Broomfield, Creech St Michael, Durleigh, Enmore, Goathurst, Lyng; Aisholt, Cannington, Charlinch, Fiddington, Otterhampton, Spaxton, Stockland Bristol, Stogursey, Over Stowey, Stringston; Bawdrip, Bridgwater, Chedzoy, Chilton Trinity, Durston, Pawlett, North Petherton, St Michaelchurch, Thurloxton, Wembdon
- Volume VII (1999), ed. C. R. J. Currie and R. W. Dunning: Bruton, Horethorne and Norton Ferris hundreds, part of Taunton Dean hundred, part of Whitley hundred: Brewham, Brewham Lodge, Eastrip and Four Towers, Bruton, Milton Clevedon, Pitcombe, Upton Noble, and Yarlington; Abbas and Temple Combe, Charlton Horethorne, North Cheriton, Corton Denham, Henstridge, Horsington, Marston Magna, Milborne Port, Stowell; Bratton Seymour, Charlton Musgrove, Cucklington, Penselwood, Shepton Montague, Stoke Trister, Wincanton, Rimpton; Blackford, Holton
- Volume VIII (2004), ed. R. W. Dunning: The Poldens and the Levels: Huntspill and Puritan hundred: Ashcott, Catcott, Chilton Polden, Cossington, Edington, Greinton, High Ham, Huntspill, Middlezoy, Moorlinch, Othery, Puriton, Shapwick, Stawell, Sutton Mallet, Westonzoyland, and Woolavington
- Volume IX (2006), ed. R. W. Dunning: Glastonbury Twelve Hides hundred, including Glastonbury and Street, Baltonsborough, Butleigh, Compton Dundon, Meare, North Wootton, Podimore Milton, Walton, West Bradley, and West Pennard
- Volume X (2010), ed. Mary C. Siraut: Castle Cary and the Brue-Cary Watershed (part of Catsash hundred)

== County Editors ==
- William Page
- C. R. J. Currie
- 1971–2006: Robert W. Dunning
- 2006– : Mary C. Siraut

The present county editor, Mary C. Siraut, served as deputy editor from 1978 to 2006 and was a full-time VCH employee until March 2011, when because of a funding shortfall she took early retirement. She is continuing work on the project on a part-time basis and is based at the new Somerset Heritage Centre in Norton Fitzwarren.

== Deputy County Editors ==
- 1970–1978: Robin Bush
- 1978–2006: Mary C. Siraut

== See also ==
- History of Somerset
- Somerset Buildings Preservation Trust
- List of places in Somerset
- Wiltshire Victoria County History
