= List of places in Somerset =

Some of the settlements of Somerset.

This is a list of cities, towns, villages and hamlets in the ceremonial county of Somerset, England. Places highlighted in bold type are towns and cities.

== A ==
Abbas Combe, Abbey Hill, Abbots Leigh, Adsborough, Adscombe, Aisholt, Alcombe, Alder Row, Aley, Alford, Alhampton, Aller, Allerford, Allowenshay, Alston Sutton, Alstone, Alvington, Amesbury, Ammerham, Andersea, Andersfield, Angersleigh, Ansford, Appley, Ash, Taunton Deane, Ash, South Somerset, Ash Priors, Ashbeer, Ashbrittle, Ashcott, Ashcott Corner, Ashill, Ashington, Ashton, Ashwell, Ashwick, Asney, Athelney, Atherstone, Axbridge

== B ==
Babcary, Babington, Backwell, Badger Street, Badgeworth, Bagborough, Bagley, Bagley Green, Baltonsborough, Bankland, Banwell, Bare Ash, Barlake, Barle, Barrington, Barrow, Barrow Gurney, Barton St David, Barwick, Batcombe, Bath, Bathampton, Bathealton, Batheaston, Bathford, Bathpool, Bathway, Battleton, Bawdrip, Beam Bridge, Beardly Batch, Beckery, Beckington, Beercrocombe, Beggearn Huish, Belluton, Benter, Berhill, Berkley, Berrow, Bickenhall, Bickham, Bicknoller, Bilbrook, Binegar, Bishop Sutton, Bishops Hull, Bishops Lydeard, Blackford, Blagdon, Blatchbridge, Bleadon, Bleadon Hill,Blue Anchor, Bodden, Bonson, Bossington, Bourne, Bourton, Bowdens, Bowlish, Bradford-on-Tone, Bradley Cross, Bradney, Brandish Street, Bratton, Bratton Seymour, Breach, Brean, Brent Knoll, Brewham, Bridgehampton, Bridgetown, Bridgwater, Broadway, Brockley, Brompton Ralph, Brompton Regis, Broomfield, Brushford, Bruton, Brympton, Buckland Dinham, Buckland St Mary, Burcott, Burlinch, Burnham-on-Sea, Burnett, Burnworthy, Burrington, Burrowbridge, Burtle, Burton Pynsent, Bury, Buscott, Bussex, Butcombe, Butleigh

== C ==
Cad Green, Cameley, Camerton, Cannard's Grave, Cannington, Carhampton, Cary Fitzpaine, Castle Cary, Catcott, Chaffcombe, Chantry, Chapel Allerton, Chapel Cleeve, Chard, Charlcombe, Charlinch, Charlton Adam, Charlton Horethorne, Charlton Mackrell, Charlton Musgrove, Charterhouse, Cheddar, Cheddon Fitzpaine, Chedzoy, Chelvey, Chelwood, Chesterblade, Chew Magna, Chew Stoke, Chewton Keynsham, Chewton Mendip, Chilcompton, Chillington, Chilthorne Domer, Chilton Cantelo, Chilton Polden, Chilton Trinity, Chipstable, Chiselborough, Christon, Churchill, Churchstanton, Churchtown, Clandown, Clapton (Somerset), Clapton (South Somerset), Clapton in Gordano, Clatworthy, Claverham, Claverton, Cleeve, Clevedon, Cloford, Closworth, Clutton, Coat, Cole, Coleford, Combe, Combe Down, Combe Florey, Combe Hay, Combe St Nicholas, Combe Throop, Combwich, Comeytrowe, Compass, Compton Bishop, Compton Dando, Compton Dundon, Compton Martin, Compton Pauncefoot, Congresbury, Corfe, Corston, Corton Denham, Cossington, Cote, Cotford St Luke, Cothelstone, Coxbridge, Coxley, Cranmore, Creech St Michael, Crewkerne, Cricket Malherbie, Cricket St Thomas, Croscombe, Cross, Crowcombe, Crowcombe Heathfield, Cucklington, Cudworth, Culbone, Curland, Curry Mallet, Curry Rivel, Cutcombe

== D ==
Dean, Dinder, Dinnington, Ditcheat, Doniford, Donyatt, Down End, Doulting, Dowlish Wake, Downhead, Downside, Draycott, Drayton, Dulcote, Dulverton, Dunball, Dundry, Dunkerton, Dunster, Durleigh, Durston

== E ==
Earnshill and Hambridge, East Bower, East Brent, East Chinnock, East Coker, Eastcombe, Mendip, Eastcombe, Taunton Deane, East Compton, East Cranmore, East Harptree, East Hewish, East Horrington, East Huntspill, East Lambrook, East Lydford, East Lyng, Easton, Easton in Gordano, Eastover, East Pennard, East Quantoxhead, East Woodlands, Ebdon, Edington, Edingworth, Elworthy, Emborough, Englishcombe, Enmore, Escott, Evercreech, Exford, Exton

== F ==
Failand, Farleigh Hungerford, Farmborough, Farrington Gurney, Faulkland, Felton, Fiddington, Fitzhead, Fivehead, Flax Bourton, Flaxpool, Forton, Foxcote, Freshford, Friary, Frome, Fulford

== G ==
Galhampton, Glastonbury, Goathurst, Godney, Golsoncott, Gordano, Great Elm, Greinton

== H ==
Halse, Halsway, Hambridge, Hapsford, Hardington, Hardington Mandeville, Hare, Haselbury Plucknett, Hatch Beauchamp, Hawkridge, Heathfield, Hemington, Henley, Henstridge, Henton, Hewish, High Ham, High Littleton, Highbridge, Higher Vexford, Hillcommon, Hillfarrance, Hinton Blewett, Hinton Charterhouse, Hinton St George, Hoccombe, Holbrook, Holcombe, Holford, Holton, Holway, Holwell, Holywell Lake, Hornblotton, Horner, Horsey, Horsington, Horton, Houndstone, Huish Champflower, Huish Episcopi, Huntspill, Hunstrete, Huntworth, Hurst, Hutton, Huxham Green

== I ==
Icelton, Ilchester, Ilford, Ilminster, Ilton, Isle Abbots, Isle Brewers

== K ==
Keinton Mandeville, Kelston, Kenn, Kewstoke, Keynsham, Kilmersdon, Kilton, Kilve, Kingsbridge, Kingsbury Episcopi, Kingsbury Regis, Kingsdon, Kingston Bridge, Kingston Seymour, Kingston St Mary, Kingstone, Kingweston, Kingswood, Kittisford, Knightcott, Knowle St Giles

== L ==
Lawford, Lamyatt, Langford Budville, Langport, Langridge, Laverton, Leighland Chapel, Leigh-on-Mendip, Lilstock, Limington, Littleton, Litton, Locking, Locking Castle, Locking Parklands, Long Ashton, Long Load, Long Sutton, Lopen, Lottisham, Lovington, Lower Vellow, Lower Vexford, Lower Weacombe, Lower Whatley, Loxton, Luccombe, Lufton, Lullington, Lulsgate, Luxborough, Lydeard St Lawrence, Lydford-on-Fosse, Lynch, Lyncombe, Lympsham, Lyng, Lytes Cary

== M ==
Maiden Head, Malmsmead, Maperton, Mark, Marksbury, Marston Bigot, Marston Magna, Martock, Maundown, Mead Fields, Meare, Mells, Merriott, Middle Chinnock, Middlezoy, Midford, Midsomer Norton, Milborne Port, Milborne Wick, Milton, Milton, Milton Clevedon, Milverton, Minehead, Misterton, Monksilver, Monkton Combe, Montacute, Moorlinch, Muchelney, Mudford, Mudford Sock

== N ==
Nailsea, Nempnett Thrubwell, Nether Stowey, Nettlebridge, Nettlecombe, Newton St Loe, North Barrow, North Bradon, North Cadbury, North Cheriton, North Curry, Northover, North Newton, North Perrott, North Petherton, North Stoke, North Weston, North Wootton, Northmoor Green, Norton Fitzwarren, Norton Malreward, Norton St Philip, Norton Sub Hamdon, Nunney, Nyland, Nynehead

== O ==
Oake, Oakhill, Oare, Oareford, Oath, Odcombe, Old Cleeve, Oldmixon, Orchardleigh, Orchard Portman, Orchard Wyndham, Othery, Otterford, Otterhampton, Over Stowey

== P ==
Parbrook, Pathe, Paulton, Pawlett, Peasedown St John, Peasmarsh, Pendomer, Penselwood, Pensford, Pibsbury, Pill, Pilton, Pitcombe, Pitminster, Pitney, Podimore, Polsham, Pooltown, Porlock, Portbury, Portishead, Prestleigh, Preston, Preston Bowyer, Preston Plucknett, Priddy, Priston, Publow, Puckington, Puriton, Purtington, Puxton, Pyleigh, Pylle

== Q ==
Queen Camel, Queen Charlton

== R ==
Rackley, Raddington, Radstock, Redhill, Redlynch, Regil, Rimpton, Roadwater, Rockwell Green, Rode, Rodney Stoke, Rooks Bridge, Rowberrow, Rudge, Ruishton, Runnington

== S ==
Saltford, Sampford Arundel, Sampford Brett, Sandford, Seavington St Mary, Seavington St Michael, Selwood, Selworthy, Shalford, Shapwick, Sharpham, Sheepway, Shepton Beauchamp, Shepton Mallet, Shepton Montague, Shipham, Shoscombe, Simonsbath, Skilgate, Sock Dennis, Somerset Bridge, Somerton, South Barrow, South Bradon, South Brent, South Cadbury, South Horrington, Southmarsh, South Petherton, Southstoke, Southway, Spargrove, Sparkford, Spaxton, Speckington, Stanton Drew, Stanton Prior, St Audries, St Catherine, St Cuthbert Out, St Decumans, St. Georges, Standerwick, Staple Fitzpaine, Staplegrove, Star, Stawell, Stawley, Steart, Stockland Bristol, Stocklinch, Stoford, Stogumber, Stogursey, Stoke Pero, Stoke St Gregory, Stoke-sub-Hamdon, Stoke St Mary, Stoke St Michael, Stoke-sub-Hamdon, Stoke Trister, Ston Easton, Stone, Stoney Stratton, Stowey, Stratton-on-the-Fosse, Street, Stringston, Sutton Bingham, Sutton Mallett, Sutton Montis, Swainswick

== T ==
Tadhill, Tarnock, Tatworth, Taunton, Tellisford, Temple Cloud, Templecombe, Theale, Thorne Coffin, Thornfalcon, Thorne St Margaret, Thurlbear, Thurloxton, Tickenham, Timberscombe, Timsbury, Tintinhull, Tivington, Tolland, Torre, Treborough, Triscombe, Trudoxhill, Trull, Tunley, Twerton

== U ==
Ubley, Uphill, Up Mudford, Upton, Upton Noble

== V ==
Vellow, Vobster, Vole

== W ==
Walcot, Walpole, Walton, Walton in Gordano, Wambrook, Wanstrow, Washford, Watchet, Waterlip, Waterrow, Wayford, Weacombe, Weare, Wearne, Webbington, Wedmore, Wellington, Wellow, Wells, Wembdon, West Bagborough, West Bradley, West Buckland, West Camel, West Charlton, West Chinnock, West Coker, Westcombe (Batcombe), Westcombe (Somerton), West Compton, West Cranmore, West Crewkerne, Westfield, West Harptree, West Hatch, Westhay, West Hewish, Westholme, West Horrington, West Huntspill, West Lambrook, West Lyng, West Monkton, West Mudford, Westowe, West Pennard, Westport, West Quantoxhead, West Wick, Weston Bampfylde, Westbury-sub-Mendip, Weston in Gordano, Weston-super-Mare, Westonzoyland, West Woodlands, Whatley (Mendip), Whatley (South Somerset), Wheathill, Wheddon Cross, Whitchurch, White Ball, Whitelackington, Whitestaunton, Wick, Wick St. Lawrence, Willett, Williton, Wilton, Wincanton, Winford, Winscombe, Winsford, Winsham, Winterstoke Gate, Witcombe, Witham Friary, Withiel Florey, Withycombe, Withypool, Wiveliscombe, Woodford, Woodlands, Wookey, Wookey Hole, Woolavington, Woollard, Woolley, Woolmersdon, Woolminstone, Woolverton, Wootton Courtenay, Worle, Worlebury, Worminster, Wraxall, Wreath, Wrington, Writhlington, Wyke Champflower

== Y ==
Yarde, Yarford, Yarley, Yarlington, Yarrow, Yatton, Yeabridge, Yenston, Yeovil, Yeovilton

== See also ==
- List of settlements in Somerset by population
- List of Sites of Special Scientific Interest in Somerset
- List of places in England
