= Hundred of North Petherton =

Historical Hundred of Somerset, England

North Petherton
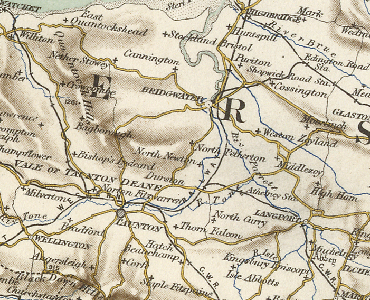
- Map including the Hundred of North Petherton
- Area
- 23,150 acres (9,370 ha) excluding Bridgwater
- History
  - Created: unknown; before 1066
- Status: Hundred
  - HQ: North Petherton
- Subdivisions
  - Type: Town, parishes
  - Units: Bridgwater, Bawdrip, Chedzoy, Chilton Trinity, Durston, St Michael Church, Pawlett, North Petherton, Thurloxton, Wembdon

The Hundred of North Petherton is one of the 40 historical Hundreds in the ceremonial county of Somerset, England, dating from before the Norman conquest. Although the Hundreds have never been formally abolished, their functions ended with the establishment of county courts in 1867 and the introduction of districts by the Local Government Act 1894. The name of the hundred derives from the name of the large royal estate (later expanded by Henry II to become the Royal Forest of North Petherton) that covered much of the area in 1086, recorded variously as Nortpetret in the Domesday Book, Nortpedret in Liber Exoniensis and Nort Peretu in the associated tax returns. This, in turn, was derived from the area's location to the northern end of the River Parrett.

The hundred was administered from North Petherton, which had been the hundred meeting place and at the centre of the royal estate during Saxon times.

== 11th century ==
A large royal estate existed at North Petherton in 1084 and constituted a hundred; assessed at 38 hides, 3 virgates, and ½ ferling. At the time of the Norman invasion the hundred covered a large area corresponding, today, roughly to a north–south corridor along the M5 motorway from Junction 25 near Taunton, to north of Junction 23 at Stretcholt, and east–west from Athelney to Goathurst. According to the Domesday Book it included the 37 places in the table below. Although the settlement of North Petherton had what was then considered to be a very large population, it paid little tax as much of it, including the Manor of North Petherton, was held by the king. The Manor and hundred were granted at fee farm by Henry I to John of Erleigh (d. circa 1162). The North Petherton hundred, the former royal estate, was held by the family of John of Erleigh as was the manor of North Petherton until 1371 when his descendant another John of Erleigh was licensed to alienate the hundred and manor to John and Margery Cole.

Place	Tax paid (geld units)	Number of households
(North) Petherton	0.8	65
(West) Monkton	15	56
Newton (West Newton and North Newton)	4	38
Creech (St Michael)	10.5	36
Bridgwater	5	32
Bawdrip	2	27
Bower (East Bower and West Bower)	1.3	23
Adsborough	2	21
Horsey	2	19
Woolmersdon	0.9	18
Durston	2.8	17
Perry	3.2	17
Lyng	1	13
Hadworthy	1	12
Hamp	1	12
Wembdon	2	12
Melcombe	0.4	10
Clayhill	1	9
Huntworth	1	9
Sandford	1.2	9
Stretcholt	1	9
Bradney	1	8
Shearston	0.5	8
Huntstile	0.3	7
Pawlett	0.3	6
Pignes	1.3	6
Waldron	1	6
Crandon	0.5	5
Crook	0.3	4
Walpole	0.8	4
Chilton (Trinity)	0.5	3
Rime	0.1	1
Athelney	0	0
Dunwear	0.3	0
Shovel	0.3	0
St Michael Church	0.5	0
Sydenham	0.3	0

== 13th & 14th century ==
By 1285 the Hundred of North Petherton is known to have included the villages and hamlets of North Petherton, West Newton, Bawdrip, Horsey, Woolmersdon, Durston, Perry, Wembdon, Clayhill, Huntworth, Sandford, East and West Stretcholt, Shearston, Pawlett, Pignes, Crandon, Chilton, Dunwear and Sydenham – all of which had been included at the time of the Domesday Book – together with Chedzoy, Tuckerton and Thurloxton which had not received separate mentions in Domesday; by 1303 Ford, Wood and Kidsbury were also named separately within the hundred.

The status of various places also changed over the intervening years. Although Lyng and Bridgwater had been included in the hundred at the time of Domesday, by 1275 Lyng held the status of a free manor and Bridgwater borough was described as a separate hundred; however by 1316 they had both returned to the jurisdiction of the Hundred of North Petherton.

== 16th century ==
In addition to changes in status, some places also moved to other hundreds. Having been part of the Hundred of North Petherton at the time of Domesday, after a period of as a free manor Creech St Michael became part of Andersfield Hundred in 1569, while Lyng is also listed in Andersfield Hundred in 1640. At some point Sydenham also left North Petherton Hundred and became part of Andersfield Hundred, before leaving it again in 1652.

== 19th century ==
By 1868 the town of Bridgwater and the parishes of Bawdrip, Chedzoy, Chilton Trinity, Durston, St. Michael Church, Pawlett, North Petherton, Thurloxton, and part of Wembdon were within the Hundred of North Petherton, which (excluding Bridgwater) covered an area of 23,150 acres (94 square kilometres). Part of the Parish of North Petherton, a separate tithing known in 1841 as Petherton limit which may have dated from the 1670s, lay within the Hundred of Andersfield. The Hundreds of Cannington and Taunton Dean lay to the West, Andersfield to south and west, with Huntspill and Puriton to the north east and Whitley Hundred and North Curry Hundred to the east, separated by the River Parrett.

The 1851 Parliamentary gazetteer of England and Wales stated that the hundred had 1,047 houses and a population of 5,800 in 1831. By 1887 the Gazetteer of the British Isles showed that the population had increased to 7,476.

== Parish boundaries ==
At least in later centuries, and possibly earlier than 1086, civil parish boundaries were not necessarily constrained by the boundaries of the hundred, and could extend into more than one hundred. The civil parish of Huntstile, for example, was partly in North Petherton Hundred and partly in Andersfield Hundred.
