= Church of St Michael and All Angels, Puriton =

Church in Somerset, England

Church of St Michael and All Angels
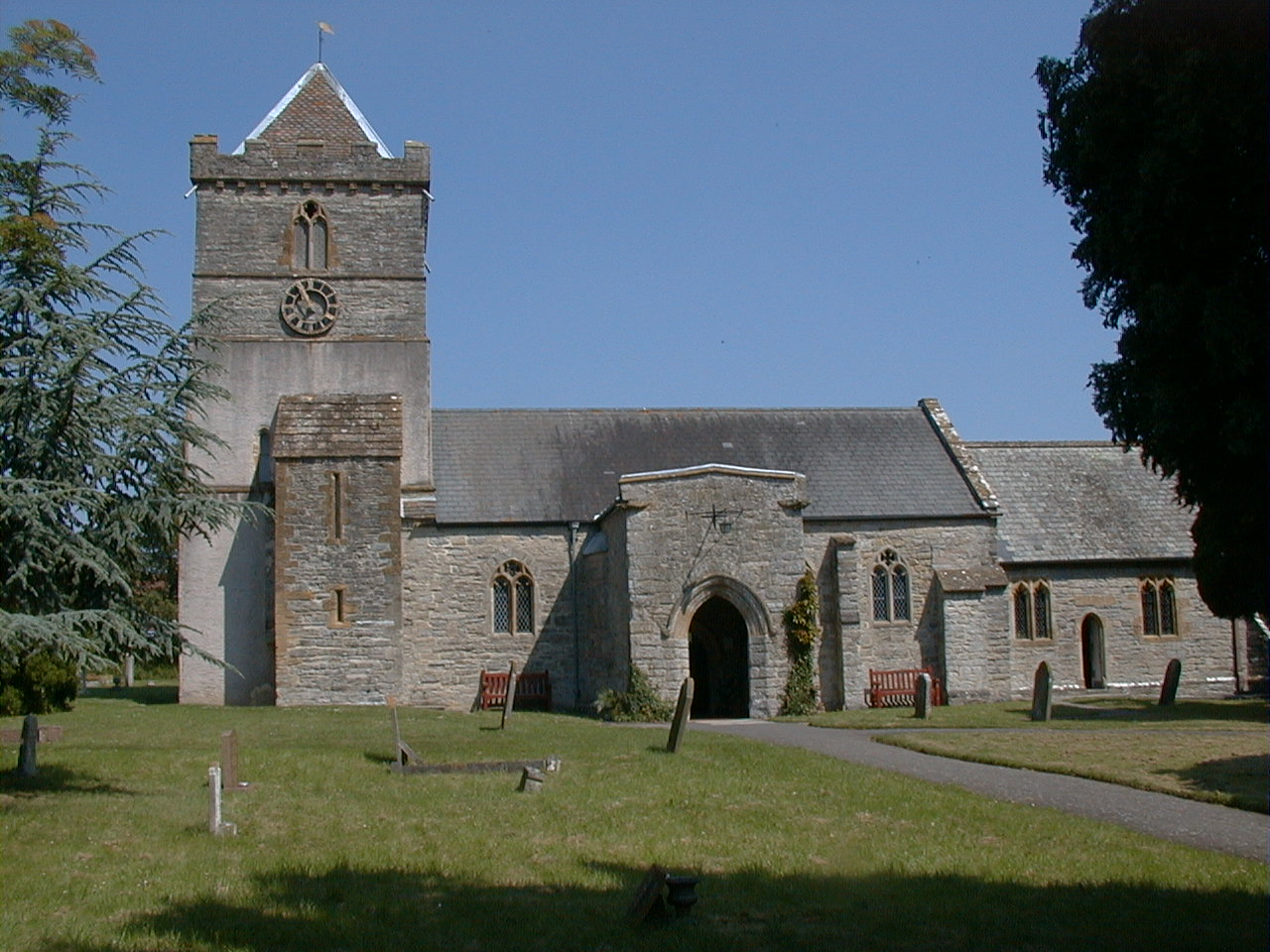

- Location within Somerset

General information
- Location: Puriton, England
- Coordinates: 51.1707°N 2.9735°W
- Construction started: 11th century
- Completed: 15th century

The Church of St Michael and All Angels in Puriton, Somerset, England was constructed from local Blue Lias stone. It has an early 13th-century tower, with the remainder of the building dating from the 14th and 15th centuries. It has been designated as a Grade I listed building.

The building is on the site of a previous church, built in the 11th century, which was given by Robert de Chandos to Goldcliff Priory in South Wales in 1113. The building is made up of a chancel, which was rebuilt in 1489 and again between 1859 and 1874, and a nave, which was rebuilt in the 15th century, with a north aisle and south porch, all built from local Blue Lias. The west tower has a pyramid roof and holds bells including one from the medieval Bristol foundry and three of 1725 by Abraham Rudhall.

The parish is part of the Link benefice of Puriton and Pawlett, Cossington, Bawdrip and Woolavington within the Sedgemoor deanery. Church Commissioners Mission and Pastoral Measure 2011 dated 5.8.2021

== See also ==
- Grade I listed buildings in Sedgemoor
- List of Somerset towers
- List of ecclesiastical parishes in the Diocese of Bath and Wells
