= Huntspill =

Village in Somerset, England

Coordinates: 51.205°N 2.982°W

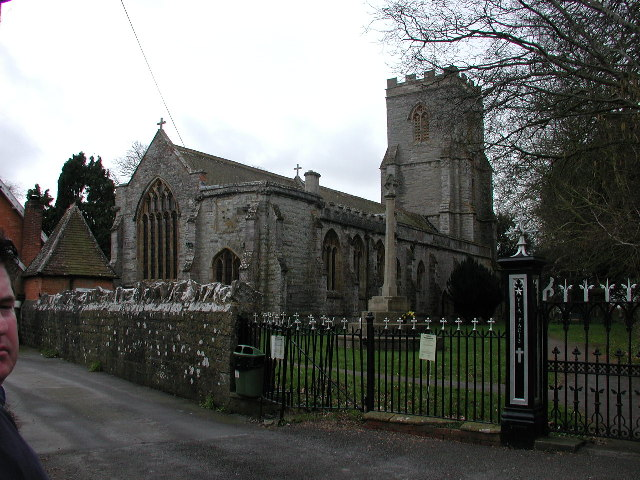
- Church of St Peter, Huntspill

- Location within Somerset
- Area: 0.395 km^{2} (0.153 sq mi)
- Population: 1,102 (2019 estimate)
  - Density: 2,790/km^{2} (7,200/sq mi)
- OS grid reference: ST315455
- Civil parish: West Huntspill
- Unitary authority: Somerset Council
- Ceremonial county: Somerset
- Region: South West
- Country: England
- Sovereign state: United Kingdom
- Post town: HIGHBRIDGE
- Postcode district: TA9
- Dialling code: 01278
- Police: Avon and Somerset
- Fire: Devon and Somerset
- Ambulance: South Western
- UK Parliament: Bridgwater

Huntspill is a village and former civil parish on the Huntspill Level in Somerset, England. It lies on the A38 road, 1.5 miles (2.4 km) south of Highbridge. The village is the principal settlement in the civil parish of West Huntspill. In 2019 it had an estimated population of 1102.

== History ==
The first mention of Huntspill is around 796 AD, when the area was granted to Glastonbury Abbey by Aethelmund, a nobleman under King Offa of Mercia.

Huntspill was listed in the Domesday Book of 1086 as Honspil, meaning 'Huna's Pill' (possibly from the Old English personal name Huna). The Welsh word Pîl, is a common element along the Somerset coast denoting a tidal inlet suitable as a harbour.

The parish of Huntspill was part of the Huntspill and Puriton Hundred,

The mouth of the River Brue had an extensive harbour in Roman and Saxon times, before silting up in the medieval period. A new wharf, known as Clyce Wharf, was built on the Huntspill side of the river mouth by 1904, and was used for the import of coal and the export of bricks and tiles and agricultural products. The wharf closed in 1949.

The village was flooded in the Bristol Channel floods of 1607.

In 1936 the village was the centre of an outbreak of Typhoid fever in which seven people died.

The ancient parish of Huntspill also included the villages of East Huntspill, Hackness and Bason Bridge, east of the village of Huntspill. The western boundary of the parish was the tidal River Parrett, but changes in the course of the river left some parts of the parish on the west side of the river until 1933, when they were transferred to the civil parish of Otterhampton. In 1885 the uninhabited Stert Island in Bridgwater Bay was transferred from the parish of Stogursey to Huntspill, but the island was also transferred to Otterhampton in 1933.

On 1 April 1949 the civil parish of Huntspill was abolished and divided into the civil parishes of West Huntspill and Huntspill All Saints (renamed East Huntspill in 1972) along the line of the Bristol and Exeter Railway. In 1931 the parish had a population of 1448.

== Governance ==
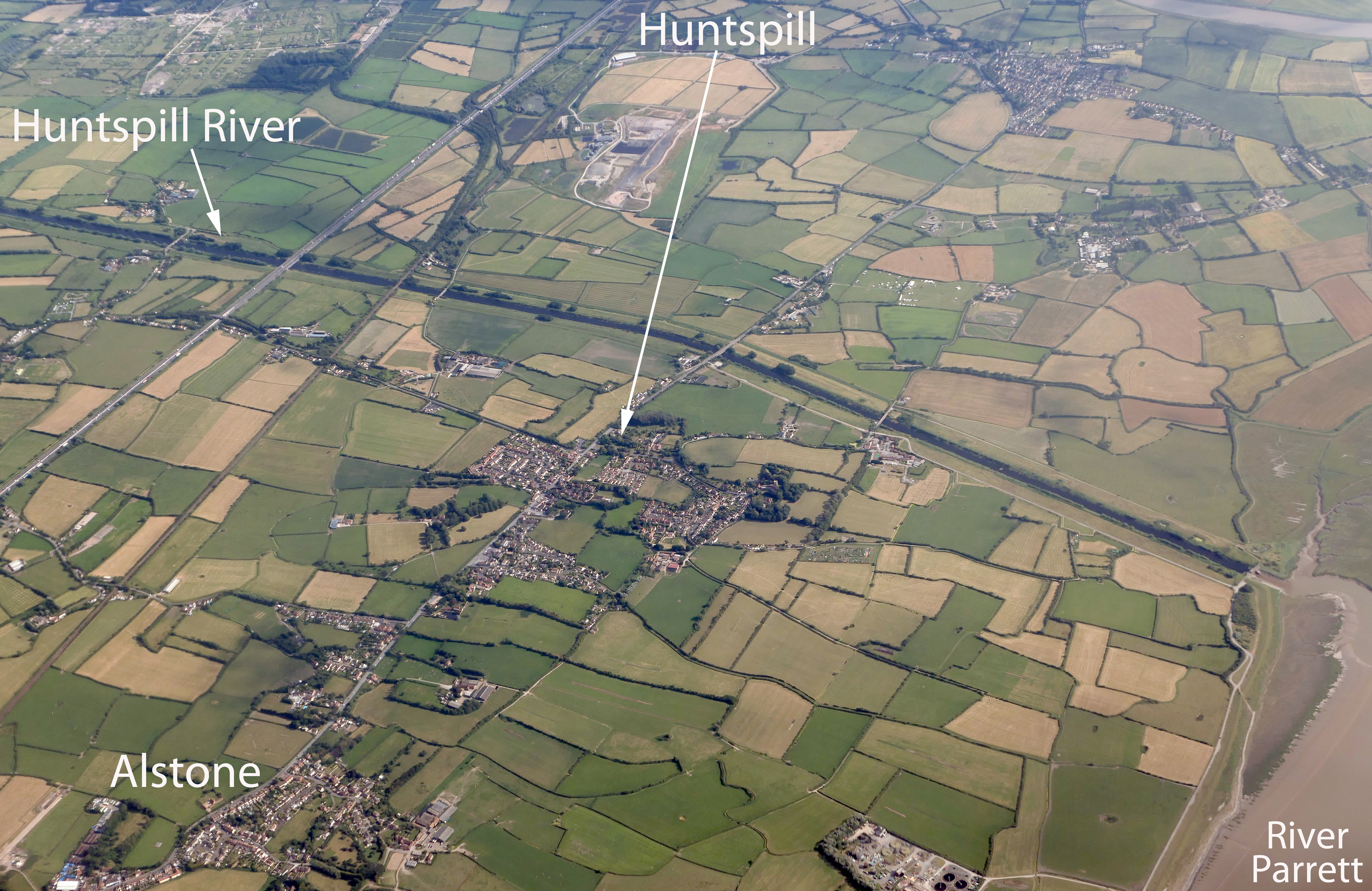
Aerial view of Huntspill and Alstone.

The parish council has responsibility for local issues, including setting an annual precept (local rate) to cover the council's operating costs and producing annual accounts for public scrutiny. The parish council evaluates local planning applications and works with the local police, district council officers, and neighbourhood watch groups on matters of crime, security, and traffic. The parish council's role also includes initiating projects for the maintenance and repair of parish facilities, as well as consulting with the district council on the maintenance, repair, and improvement of highways, drainage, footpaths, public transport, and street cleaning. Conservation matters (including trees and listed buildings) and environmental issues are also the responsibility of the council.

For local government purposes, since 1 April 2023, the village comes under the unitary authority of Somerset Council. Prior to this, it was part of the non-metropolitan district of Sedgemoor, which was formed on 1 April 1974 under the Local Government Act 1972, having previously been part of Bridgwater Rural District.

The village falls within the 'Huntspill and Pawlett' electoral ward. As is indicated by the name Pawlett is also included within the ward. The total population at the 2011 census was 2,171.

It is also part of the Bridgwater county constituency represented in the House of Commons of the Parliament of the United Kingdom. It elects one Member of Parliament (MP) by the first past the post system of election.

== Religious sites ==
The Church of St Peter was established by 1208, rebuilt around 1400, and extended in the early to mid 15th century. It was gutted by fire in 1878 and restored over the next two years. It has been designated as a Grade I listed building.

== Notable people ==
- Thomas Brewer (1868-?), first-class cricketer

== See also ==
- Huntspill River
- River Brue
- River Parrett
