= St Peter's Church, West Huntspill =

Church in Somerset, England

Church of St Peter
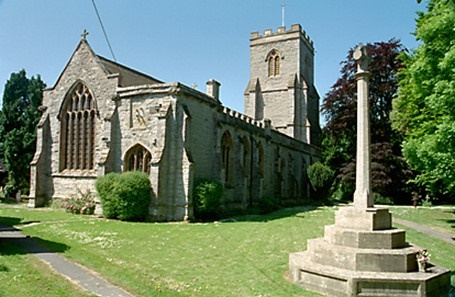

- Location within Somerset

General information
- Location: Huntspill, England
- Coordinates: 51.2042°N 2.9966°W
- Completed: c. 1400

The Church of St Peter in Huntspill, Somerset, England, was established by 1208, rebuilt around 1400, and extended in the early to mid-15th century. It was gutted by fire in 1878 and restored over the next two years. It has been designated a Grade I listed building.

Before the Norman Conquest the Christian community at Huntspill was given by Offa of Mercia to Glastonbury Abbey. In the 13th century it was given to Tickford Priory at Newport Pagnell until it was taken under the control of the Bishop of Wells. Since the 18th century the patronage has been held by Balliol College, Oxford. The church's original dedication was to All Saints, which changed to St Peter around 1872 and then in the 1950s the dedication to St Peter and All Hallows was adopted.

The church has a five-bay nave and chancel and four-stage west tower. The tower holds six bells which date from 1879 when they replaced the previous five, the oldest of which was cast in 1693.

The church underwent extensive Victorian restoration between 1878 and 1880, following a major fire which gutted the interior and roof, leaving only the stonework still standing.

Refurbishment work to glass the in Lady Chapel and the north door during 2011 was delayed when the company carrying out the work went into receivership.

The parish is part of the Huntspill and East Huntspill benefice within the Axbridge deanery.

== See also ==
- Grade I listed buildings in Sedgemoor
- List of Somerset towers
- List of ecclesiastical parishes in the Diocese of Bath and Wells
