= Church of St Mary, Woolavington =

Church in Somerset, England

Church of St Mary
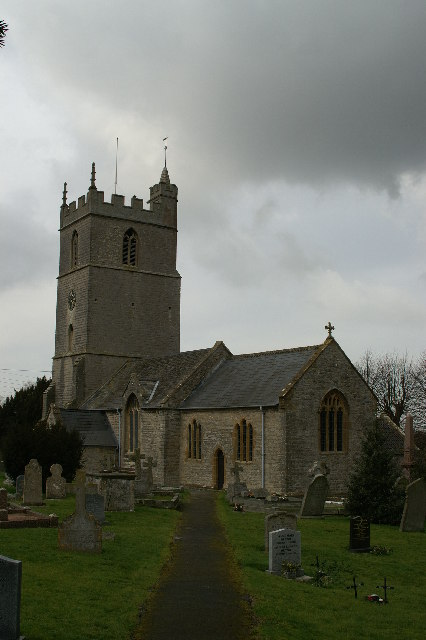

- Location within Somerset

General information
- Location: Woolavington, England
- Coordinates: 51.1703°N 2.9341°W
- Completed: 11th century

The Church of St Mary in Woolavington, Somerset, England has 11th-century origins and is a Grade I listed building.

== History ==
There may have been a church on the site prior to the Norman Conquest of England, but the present building may have been started around 1154 by Maud and Philip Columber, the lords of the manor at that time. In the early 12th century it was granted to Goldcliff Priory in Monmouthshire by its founder Robert de Chandos, who was lord of the manor of Woolavington. In the 14th century the chancel was added and the tower started. By 1285 a separate chapel in the churchyard housed three chantries. A chapel was added in 1441. In the 15th century it passed to the canons of Windsor.

The tower, the upper stages of which were rebuilt in the 17th century, has a peal of eight bells, the oldest of which was cast in 1400.

The interior includes a pulpit and oak panels from the 15th century. There is also a memorial stone to Sir John Hody, an English judge and Chief Justice of the King's Bench who died in the 15th century.

The parish is part of the benefice of Woolavington with Cossington and Bawdrip, within the Sedgemoor deanery.

== See also ==
- Grade I listed buildings in Sedgemoor
- List of Somerset towers
- List of ecclesiastical parishes in the Diocese of Bath and Wells
