= Sedgemoor =

Former non-metropolitan district in England

- Shown within Somerset
- Sovereign state: United Kingdom
- Constituent country: England
- Region: South West England
- Ceremonial county: Somerset
- Administrative County: Somerset Council

Area
  - Total: 217.90 sq mi (564.36 km^{2})

Population (2021)
  - Total: 125,752
  - Density: 577.11/sq mi (222.82/km^{2})
- Time zone: UTC0 (GMT)
  - Summer (DST): UTC+1 (BST)
- Post Code: TA5-9
- Area code: 01278
- Website: www.somerset.gov.uk

Sedgemoor is a low-lying area of land in Somerset, England. It lies close to sea level south of the Polden Hills, historically largely marsh (or "moor" in its older sense). The eastern part is known as King's Sedgemoor, and the western part West Sedgemoor. Sedgemoor is part of the area now known as the Somerset Levels and Moors. Historically the area was known as the site of the Battle of Sedgemoor.

Sedgemoor gave its name to a local government district formed on 1 April 1974, under the Local Government Act 1972, by a merger of the municipal borough of Bridgwater, the Burnham-on-Sea urban district, Bridgwater Rural District and part of Axbridge Rural District. The district covered a larger area than the historical Sedgemoor, extending north of the Polden Hills across the Somerset Levels and Moors to the Mendip Hills.

On 1 April 2023 the district was abolished and replaced by a new unitary district for the area previously served by Somerset County Council. The replacement council is Somerset Council. Elections for the new council took place in May 2022, and it ran alongside Sedgemoor and the other councils until their abolition in April 2023.

== Toponymy ==
Sedgemoor does not mean 'sedge moor", but is instead 'marsh of a man called Sicga' from the Old Norse personal name Sicga and Old English mor 'moor'. The name was recorded as Secgamere in 1165.

== Largest settlements ==
- Bridgwater – the administrative centre
- Burnham-on-Sea
- North Petherton
- Highbridge
- Axbridge
- Cheddar

== Parishes ==
Image	Name	Status	Population	Former local authority	Coordinates	Refs
Street scene showing road junction with houses and cars	Ashcott	Civil parish	1,186	Bridgwater Rural District	51.12°N 2.81°W	
Street scene. On the left of the road is a half timbered house where the first and second storeys have irregular black wooden beams showing through white painted walls.	Axbridge	Town	2,057	Axbridge Rural District	51.29°N 2.82°W	
Stone building with square tower. In the foreground are gravestones.	Badgworth	Civil parish	525	Axbridge Rural District	51.27°N 2.87°W	
Brown stone building with red roofs and central square tower. In the foreground are gravestones.	Bawdrip	Civil parish	506	Bridgwater Rural District	51.15°N 2.94°W	
Wooden hulk of ship, surrounded by wet sand.	Berrow	Civil parish	1,534	Axbridge Rural District	51.27°N 3.01°W	
Looking due north at a beach, caravan sites and village in the distance seen from the top of a hill	Brean	Civil parish	635	Axbridge Rural District	51.30°N 3.01°W	
Red brick buildings in front of grey stone church. In the foreground in a grassy field contained within a hedge and fence.	Brent Knoll	Civil parish	1,271	Axbridge Rural District	51.25°N 2.95°W	
Statue of figure with outstretched arm. To the left a tall church spire and the right a circular building with columns.	Bridgwater	Town	35,886	Bridgwater Municipal Borough	51.13°N 2.99°W	
Large road w2ith houses to left and right and hills beyond.	Bridgwater Without	Civil parish	428	Bridgwater Rural District	51.14°N 2.97°W	
Stone building with prominent square tower.	Broomfield	Civil parish	249	Bridgwater Rural District	51.08°N 3.11°W	
Short pier above sand, surmounted by white pavilion with flag poles.	Burnham on Sea and Highbridge	Town	19,576	Burnham on Sea Urban District	51.24°N 2.99°W	
Small light coloured building behind a hedge and gate.	Burnham Without	Civil Parish	1,636	Axbridge Rural District	51.23°N 2.96°W	
Small stone building with arched doorway. The church is partially obscured by trees.	Burtle	Civil parish	388	Bridgwater Rural District	51.17°N 2.87°W	
Red stone church with square tower.	Cannington	Civil parish	2,271	Bridgwater Rural District	51.15°N 3.07°W	
View of the roofs of houses amongst trees and fields. Hills in the distance under a blue cloudless sky.	Catcott	Civil parish	531	Bridgwater Rural District	51.15°N 2.87°W	
White circular building with four black sails.	Chapel Allerton	Civil parish	401	Axbridge Rural District	51.25°N 2.85°W	
Roofs of multiple buildings separated by trees and vegetation. In the distance is a lake and hills.	Cheddar	Civil parish	5,755	Axbridge Rural District	51.28°N 2.78°W	
Stone building with square tower.	Chedzoy	Civil parish	404	Bridgwater Rural District	51.13°N 2.95°W	
Square stone tower, behind a stone wall and partially obscured by a tree.	Chilton Polden	Civil parish	698	Bridgwater Rural District	51.15°N 2.90°W	
Reddish stone building with square tower.	Chilton Trinity	Civil parish	260	Bridgwater Rural District	51.15°N 3.01°W	
Church building with square tower seen within green fields with trees and hills behind.	Compton Bishop	Civil parish	620	Axbridge Rural District	51.30°N 2.87°W	
Stone building with square tower at left hand end. In the foreground either side of a path are gravestones in a grassy area.	Cossington	Civil parish	564	Bridgwater Rural District	51.16°N 2.92°W	
Stone buildings with water in front.	Durleigh	Civil parish	548	Bridgwater Rural District	51.12°N 3.04°W	
Roofs of houses with prominent church spire to the right. Hills in the background.	East Brent	Civil parish	1,302	Axbridge Rural District	51.26°N 2.94°W	
Road junction with direction sign. In the background is a white painted building with a pub sign saying The Crown.	East Huntspill	Civil parish	1,146	Bridgwater Rural District	51.20°N 2.98°W	
Stone wall with arched gap, overgrown with weeds.	Edington	Civil parish	372	Bridgwater Rural District	51.15°N 2.88°W	
Square stone tower of church with residential buildings. In the foreground grass field contained by wooden fences.	Enmore	Civil parish	247	Bridgwater Rural District	51.11°N 3.09°W	
Stone building with lighter coloured square tower. In the foreground are gravestones.	Fiddington	Civil parish	298	Bridgwater Rural District	51.16°N 3.12°W	
Stone building with pillars, surrounded by grass.	Goathurst	Civil parish	193	Bridgwater Rural District	51.10°N 3.06°W	
Stone building with square tower, separated from the road in the foreground by a stone wall.	Greinton	Civil Parish	71	Bridgwater Rural District	51.12°N 2.84°W	
White building with grey roof in the middle of green grass area.	Lympsham	Civil parish	960	Axbridge Rural District	51.29°N 2.95°W	
Square church tower showing above tees and shrubs. In the foreground is a grass field with cattle.	Lyng	Civil parish	338	Bridgwater Rural District	51.05°N 2.96°W	
Stone building with prominent square tower. In the foreground are gravestones.	Mark	Civil parish	1,478	Axbridge Rural District	51.23°N 2.89°W	
Stone building with prominent square tower.	Middlezoy	Civil parish	725	Bridgwater Rural District	51.09°N 2.89°W	
Square stone tower surrounded by trees and grass.	Moorlinch	Civil parish	408	Bridgwater Rural District	51.13°N 2.86°W	
Stone building with prominent square tower. In the foreground are gravestones.	Nether Stowey	Civil parish	1,373	Bridgwater Rural District	51.15°N 3.15°W	
Stone building with prominent square tower.	North Petherton	Town	6,730	Bridgwater Rural District	51.09°N 3.01°W	
Stone building with square tower	Othery	Civil parish	642	Bridgwater Rural District	51.08°N 2.88°W	
Stone building with prominent square tower. In the foreground is a road and wall.	Otterhampton	Civil parish	831	Bridgwater Rural District	51.18°N 3.08°W	
Stone building with prominent square tower. In the foreground are daffodils.	Over Stowey	Civil parish	352	Bridgwater Rural District	51.15°N 3.15°W	
modern building with shop. Sign over window says Pawlett Country Store & Off Licence.	Pawlett	Civil Parish	1,038	Bridgwater Rural District	51.18°N 3.00°W	
Stone building with square tower	Puriton	Civil parish	1,068	Bridgwater Rural District	51.17°N 2.97°W	
Stone building with square tower	Shapwick	Civil parish	536	Bridgwater Rural District	51.14°N 2.83°W	
Stone cross surrounded by railings on grass area in front of roads and houses.	Shipham	Civil parish	1,087	Axbridge Rural District	51.31°N 2.80°W	
White painted building with pub sign saying The Lamb Inn	Spaxton	Civil parish	1,012	Bridgwater Rural District	51.13°N 3.11°W	
Stone building with small square tower. In the foreground is a road and wall.	Stawell	Civil parish	386	Bridgwater Rural District	51.14°N 2.91°W	
Houses amongst trees seen across fields and hedges.	Stockland Bristol	Civil parish	165	Bridgwater Rural District	51.19°N 3.08°W	
White painted building with black timbers. In the foreground is a road and road sign.	Thurloxton	Civil parish	153	Bridgwater Rural District	51.07°N 3.04°W	
Gray stone building with square tower	Weare	Civil parish	658	Axbridge Rural District	51.27°N 2.84°W	
Stone building with square tower	Wedmore	Civil Parish	3,318	Axbridge Rural District	51.23°N 2.81°W	
Red stone building with square tower. In the foreground are gravestones.	Wembdon	Civil parish	3,613	Bridgwater Rural District	51.13°N 3.02°W	
Stone building with arched window and square tower, separated from the road by a stone wall and railings.	West Huntspill	Civil parish	1,414	Bridgwater Rural District	51.20°N 2.98°W	
Stone building with square tower	Westonzoyland	Civil parish	1,801	Bridgwater Rural District	51.11°N 2.92°W	
Stone building with square tower	Woolavington	Civil parish	2,115	Bridgwater Rural District	51.17°N 2.93°W	

== Rivers ==
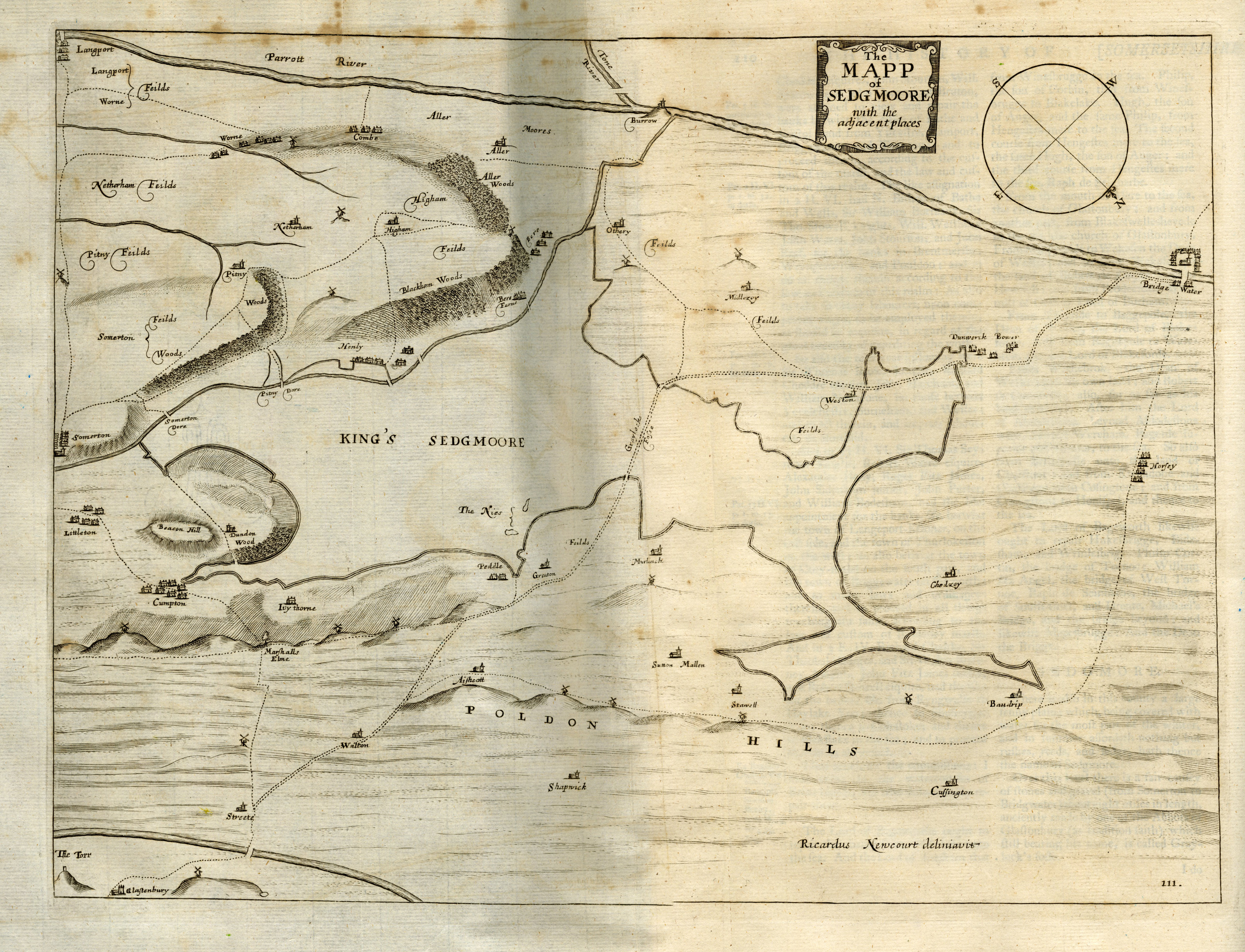
"The Map of Sedgemoor, with adjacent Parts" from "The history of imbanking and drayning" by William Dugdale (1662).

- River Parrett
- River Brue
- River Huntspill
- King's Sedgemoor Drain

== Battles ==
- Battle of Sedgemoor 1685

== Industry ==
Light industry now predominates, but traditional trades including peat extraction, willow crafts and cider making may still be found, in addition to livestock farming. The River Parrett provides a source of eels (anguilla anguilla) and elvers from January through to May.

Also notable is the new Isleport trading estate at Highbridge, which houses many global businesses such as Geest (Isleport Foods) who make yoghurt under franchise to Ski & Muller, Brake Brothers who supply the catering trade, BFP wholesale who supply dry goods to bakeries etc., Woodbury & Haines who supply furniture globally, Polybeam Limited who supply GRP radio masts to customers such as Marconi, and also AT&T whose centre there controls all internet cable traffic to and from the US.

Industry in Bridgwater has also seen major growth recently with the opening of "Express Park" which houses Gerber Foods (a global fruit juice supplier), NHS Logistics depot and Eddie Stobart depot.

== Governance ==
=== Sedgemoor District Council ===
The Sedgemoor district was established in 1974 and was based in Bridgwater. It covers a mostly rural area between the Quantock Hills and the Mendip Hills. The council, along with Somerset County Council, was replaced in April 2023 by Somerset Council, a unitary authority.

== Education ==
Schools (those which are not independent) in Sedgemoor are operated the Children & Young People's Directorate of Somerset County Council, although some such as The Kings of Wessex School in Cheddar have distanced themselves from the county council by opting for foundation and then subsequently academy status.

== See also ==
- List of Grade I listed buildings in Sedgemoor
- List of Scheduled Monuments in Sedgemoor
