= Bridgwater Rural District =

Former local government area in the UK

Coordinates: 51.14°N 2.965°W

- Population
  - 1911: 18,202
  - 1961: 21,980
- History
  - Created: 1894
  - Abolished: 1974
- Status: Rural district

Bridgwater was a rural district in Somerset, England, from 1894 to 1974.

It was created in 1894 under the Local Government Act 1894.

In 1974 it was abolished under the Local Government Act 1972 becoming part of Sedgemoor.

It contained the civil parishes of Aisholt, Ashcott, Bawdrip, Bridgwater Without, Broomfield, Cannington, Catcott, Charlynch, Chedzoy, Chilton Common, Chilton Polden, Chilton Trinity, Cossington, Durleigh, East Huntspill, Eddington, Enmore, Fiddington, Goathurst, Greinton, Huntspill, Lyng, Middlezoy, Moorlinch, Nether Stowey, North Petherton, Othery, Otterhampton, Over Stowey, Pawlett, Puriton, Shapwick, Spaxton, St Michaelchurch, Stawell, Stockland Bristol, Sutton Mallet, Thurloxton, Wembdon, West Huntspill, Westonzoyland and Woolavington.
