= West Huntspill =

Civil parish in Somerset, England

Coordinates: 51.195542°N 2.9953771°W

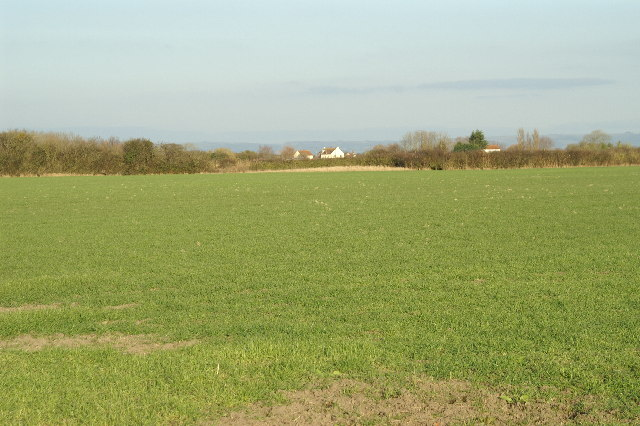

- Location within Somerset
- Area: 8.04 km^{2} (3.10 sq mi)
- Population: 1,414 (2011 census)
  - Density: 176/km^{2} (460/sq mi)
- Civil parish: West Huntspill
- Unitary authority: Somerset
- Ceremonial county: Somerset
- Region: South West
- Country: England
- Sovereign state: United Kingdom
- Post town: HIGHBRIDGE
- Postcode district: TA9
- Dialling code: 01278
- Police: Avon and Somerset
- Fire: Devon and Somerset
- Ambulance: South Western
- Website: http://www.westhuntspillpc.co.uk/

West Huntspill is a settlement and civil parish about 5 miles from Bridgwater, in the county of Somerset, England. The parish includes the village of Huntspill and the hamlet of Alstone. In 2011 the parish had a population of 1414. The parish touches Burnham-on-Sea and Highbridge, East Huntspill, Otterhampton, Pawlett and Puriton.

== Features ==
There are 14 listed buildings in West Huntspill.

== History ==
The parish was formed on 1 April 1949 from the parish of Huntspill when Huntspill was abolished and split into "East Huntspill and "West Huntspill".
