= Thomas Brewer (cricketer) =

English cricketer

Personal information
- Full name: Thomas Tanner Brewer
- Born: 23 August 1868; Huntspill, Somerset, England
- Died: Unknown
- Batting: Unknown

Domestic team information
- Years: Team
- 1903: London County
- 1909: Cheshire

Career statistics
Competition	First-class
Matches	5
Runs scored	88
Batting average	12.57
100s/50s	–/1
Top score	59
Catches/stumpings	5/–
- Source: Cricinfo, 27 February 2019

Thomas Tanner Brewer (23 August 1868 – date of death unknown) was an English first-class cricketer.

Brewer was born at Huntspill in Somerset. He made his debut in first-class cricket for London County against Leicestershire at Leicester in 1903. He made two further first-class appearances for London County in 1903, playing against Lancashire and Derbyshire, scoring 86 runs at an average of 17.20. His highest score of 59 was made against Lancashire during a ninth wicket stand of 126 with Les Poidevin. He later played two first-class matches for the Gentlemen of England in 1905, against Surrey and Oxford University, before playing minor counties cricket for Cheshire in 1909, making three appearances in the Minor Counties Championship.
