= List of settlements in Somerset by population =

The largest settlements of the county of Somerset, with cities in bold, and administrative centres in yellow.

This is a list of settlements in Somerset by population based on the results of the 2011 census. In 2011, there were 28 built-up area subdivisions with 5,000 or more inhabitants in Somerset, shown in the table below.

This is not a list of parishes or their populations, but of settlements as defined by the ONS.

== Population ranking ==
#	Settlement	Unitary authority	Population		Designation
#	Settlement	Unitary authority	2001	2011	Designation
1	Bath	Bath and North East Somerset	89,760	94,782	City
2	Weston-super-Mare	North Somerset	77,240	83,641	Town
3	Taunton	Somerset	56,760	60,479	Town
4	Yeovil	Somerset	42,060	45,784	Town
5	Bridgwater	Somerset	36,610	41,276	Town
6	Frome	Somerset	24,510	26,203	Town
7	Portishead	North Somerset	17,340	23,699	Town
8	Burnham-on-Sea/Highbridge	Somerset	21,480	23,325	Town
9	Clevedon	North Somerset	21,655	21,002	Town
10	Nailsea	North Somerset	17,028	16,060	Town
11	Keynsham	Bath and North East Somerset	15,533	15,641	Town
12	Chard	Somerset	12,010	13,074	Town
13	Street	Somerset	12,170	12,911	Village
14	Midsomer Norton	Bath and North East Somerset	11,902	12,415	Town
15	Minehead	Somerset	11,700	11,981	Town
16	Wellington	Somerset	10,600	11,213	Town
17	Wells	Somerset	10,406	10,536	City
18	Shepton Mallet	Somerset	8,980	10,369	Town
19	Radstock	Bath and North East Somerset	8,818	9,419	Town
20	Glastonbury	Somerset	8,429	8,471	Town
21	Crewkerne	Somerset	7,520	7,826	Town
22	Yatton	North Somerset	7,196	7,203	Village
23	Peasedown St John	Bath and North East Somerset	6,127	6,269	Village
24	Ilminster	Somerset	4,570	5,808	Town
25	Wincanton	Somerset	4,803	5,435	Town
26	Paulton	Bath and North East Somerset	4,896	5,302	Village
27	Long Ashton	North Somerset	3,940	5,254	Village
28	Cheddar	Somerset	4,849	5,199	Village
29	Pill/Easton-in-Gordano	North Somerset	4,719	4,828	Village
30	Somerton	Somerset	4,133	4,697	Town
31	Winscombe	North Somerset	4,332	4,546	Village
32	Martock	Somerset	4,309	4,522	Village
33	Watchet	Somerset	3,710	3,581	Town
34	Wedmore	Somerset	3,145	3,318	Village
35	North Petherton	Somerset	3,140	3,142	Town
36	Bruton	Somerset	2,945	2,907	Town
37	South Petherton	Somerset	2,515	2,747	Village
38	Williton	Somerset	2,697	2,574	Village
39	Castle Cary	Somerset	2,096	2,276	Town
40	Wiveliscombe	Somerset	2,084	2,178	Town
41	Axbridge	Somerset	2,024	2,057	Town
42	Dulverton	Somerset	1,109	1,408	Town
43	Langport	Somerset	2,977	1,081	Town

== See also ==
- Somerset
