= Winterstoke Gate =

Settlement in Locking Parish, North Somerset, England

Coordinates: 51.3439975°N 2.9057299°W

- Settlement
- Location within Somerset
- OS grid reference: ST370609
- Civil parish: Locking
- Unitary authority: North Somerset
- Shire county: Somerset
- Region: South West
- Country: England
- Sovereign state: United Kingdom
- Post town: WESTON-SUPER-MARE
- Postcode district: BS24
- Dialling code: 01934
- Police: Avon and Somerset
- Fire: Devon and Somerset
- Ambulance: South Western
- UK Parliament: Weston-super-Mare

Winterstoke Gate is a settlement in Locking Parish, North Somerset, England. The development comprises 425 homes.

The development was built on former farmland by Keepmoat Homes and was built on council owned land just North of the former RAF Locking. The development opened in November 2023.

The 'North South Spine Road' (Apprentice Way) is the main road of Winterstoke Gate. As of 2026 it is under construction and it will run from Churchland Road to Locking Moor Road. (A371 road)

Archaeological excavations in October 2017 by Wessex Archaeology revealed boundary ditches, and Romano-British and Post-Medieval pottery was found on the site. The site was drained and reclaimed from Marshland in the Iron Age, with early evidence of activity associated with salt production. The land was primarily used for pasture in the Post Medieval period, with rhynes (drainage ditches) and sea walls being used to regulate water levels. Settlement increased from the 16th Century indicated by pottery deposits.
