= Catcott =

Village in Somerset, England

Coordinates: 51.150°N 2.865°W

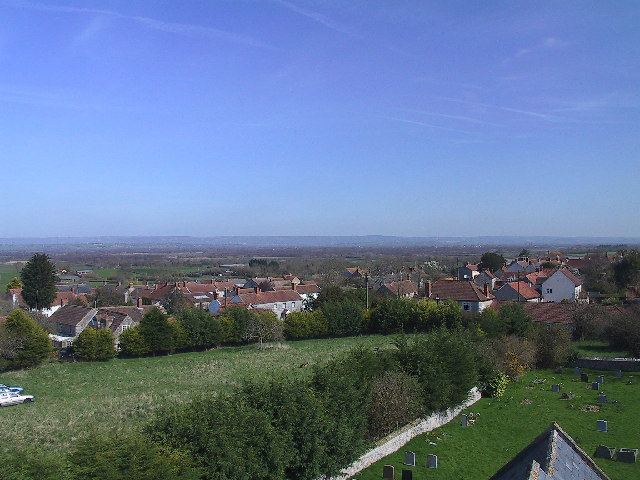
- Village of Catcott and part of church yard. From tower of St Peter's Church

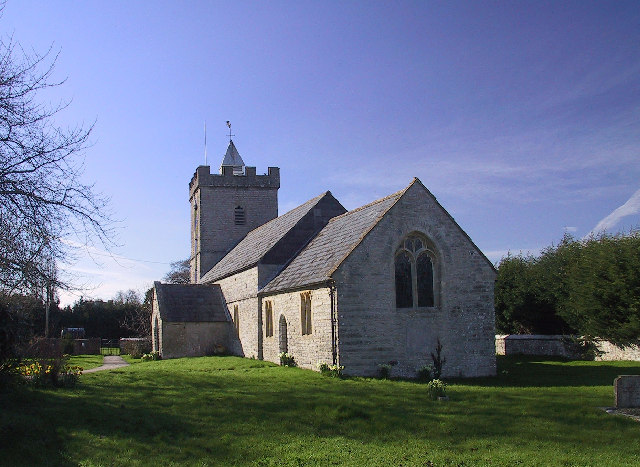
- St Peter's Church

- Location within Somerset
- Population: 531 (2011)
- OS grid reference: ST395393
- Unitary authority: Somerset Council
- Ceremonial county: Somerset
- Region: South West
- Country: England
- Sovereign state: United Kingdom
- Post town: BRIDGWATER
- Postcode district: TA7
- Dialling code: 01278
- Police: Avon and Somerset
- Fire: Devon and Somerset
- Ambulance: South Western
- UK Parliament: Wells and Mendip Hills

Catcott is a rural village and civil parish, situated close to Edington 7 miles (11.3 km) to the east of Bridgwater on the Somerset Levels to the north of the Polden Hills in Somerset, England.

== History ==
In the Domesday Book of 1086, Roger de Courcelles held five hides at Catcott, which were recorded with Glastonbury Abbey's Shapwick estate.

In 1990 Catcott was the winner of the village category of the Britain in Bloom competition.

The one-time Director-General of the Security Service, MI5, Sir Roger Hollis, spent his retirement in Catcott from 1968 until his death in 1973.

== Governance ==
The parish council has responsibility for local issues, including setting an annual precept (local rate) to cover the council’s operating costs and producing annual accounts for public scrutiny. The parish council evaluates local planning applications and works with the local police, district council officers, and neighbourhood watch groups on matters of crime, security, and traffic. The parish council's role also includes initiating projects for the maintenance and repair of parish facilities, as well as consulting with the district council on the maintenance, repair, and improvement of highways, drainage, footpaths, public transport, and street cleaning. Conservation matters (including trees and listed buildings) and environmental issues are also the responsibility of the council.

For local government purposes, since 1 April 2023, the village comes under the unitary authority of Somerset Council. Prior to this, it was part of the non-metropolitan district of Sedgemoor, which was formed on 1 April 1974 under the Local Government Act 1972, having previously been part of Bridgwater Rural District.

It is also part of the Wells and Mendip Hills constituency represented in the House of Commons of the Parliament of the United Kingdom. It elects one Member of Parliament (MP) by the first past the post system of election, and was part of the South West England constituency of the European Parliament prior to Britain leaving the European Union in January 2020, which elected seven MEPs using the d'Hondt method of party-list proportional representation.

== Education ==
Catcott primary school opened in 1842 and the original building is still in use, with further buildings being constructed in the 1970s and in 2000.

== Transport ==
The nearest station was Edington Burtle on the Highbridge Branch of the Somerset and Dorset Joint Railway. It closed in 1966.

== Sites of Special Scientific Interest ==
Catcott, Edington and Chilton Moors SSSI is a 1,083 hectares (2,680 acres) biological Site of Special Scientific Interest consisting of land south of the River Brue managed by Somerset Wildlife Trust and is known for the variety of the bird life. The site consists of low-lying land south of the River Brue, which floods on a regular basis; land north is included in the Tealham and Tadham Moors SSSI. The site is managed by Somerset Wildlife Trust and includes the Catcott Lows National Nature Reserve, of grassland in the summer, but flood during the winter, creating a perfect habitat for wintering waterfowl and Bewick's swans, Roe deer and several invertebrate species of scientific interest also inhabit the area, Catcott Heath and Catcott North.

== Religious sites ==
The Anglican parish Church of St Peter dates predominantly from the 15th century, but still includes some minor 13th-century work, and has been designated as a Grade I listed building. It was formerly one of the Polden Chapels held under Moorlinch; it was adjudged in 1548 to have been a chantry chapel and thus liable to closure and sale by Edward VI's commissioners. It was bought by William Coke, who already held the tithes. He armed himself to keep out the parishioners until 1552 when he demolished it. Following a series of court cases he was forced to rebuild it.

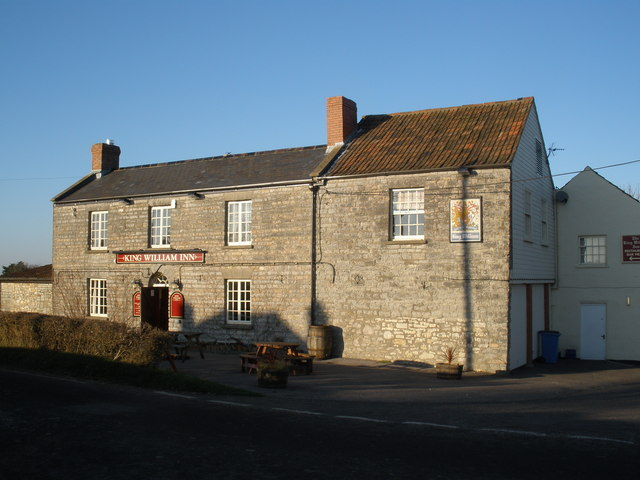
King William Inn

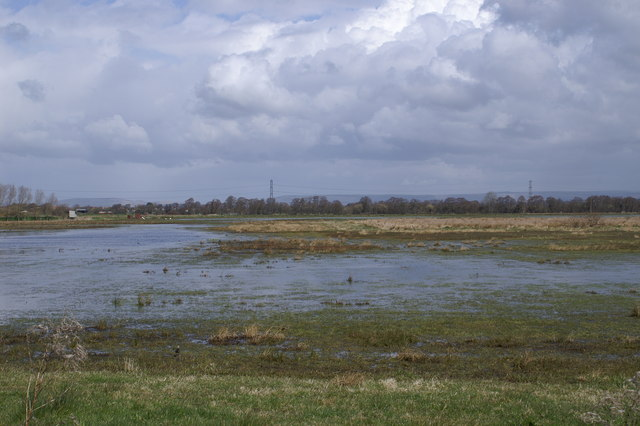
Flooded Catcott Heath.

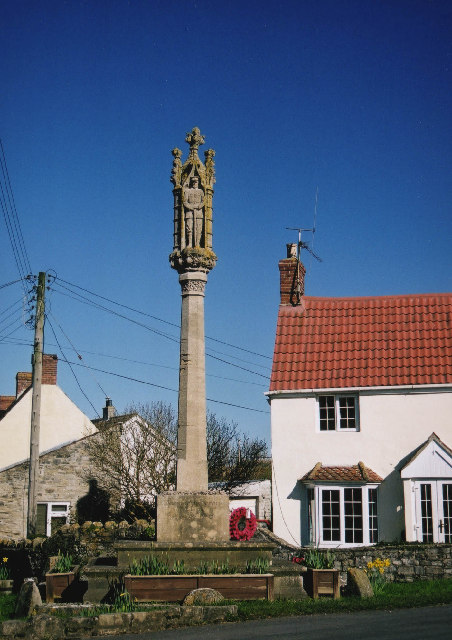
War Memorial
