= Ashcott =

Village in Somerset, England

Coordinates: 51.12°N 02.81°W

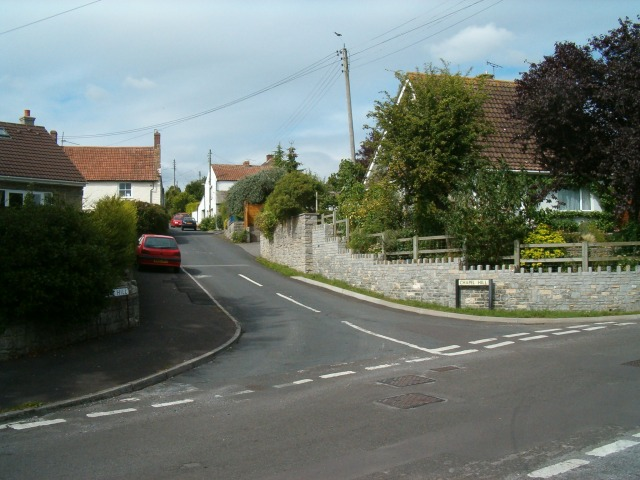
- Chapel Hill, Ashcott

- Location within Somerset
- Population: 1,186 (2011)
- OS grid reference: ST4337
- Unitary authority: Somerset Council
- Ceremonial county: Somerset
- Region: South West
- Country: England
- Sovereign state: United Kingdom
- Post town: BRIDGWATER
- Postcode district: TA7
- Dialling code: 01458
- Police: Avon and Somerset
- Fire: Devon and Somerset
- Ambulance: South Western
- UK Parliament: Wells and Mendip Hills

Ashcott is a small village and civil parish located in the Sedgemoor area of Somerset in the south-west of England. The village has a population of 1,186. The parish includes the hamlets of Ashcott Corner, Berhill, Buscott, Nythe and Pedwell.

The village has five pubs and its own brewer, Moor Beer. It has a church, shop, a primary school and an all-through independent school.

The annual Ashcott BeerFest is held on the Coronation playing fields at the end of June/beginning of July each year. It raises money for the Playing Fields, Cheeky Chimps Pre-School and the Ashcott Primary School PTA.

== History ==
The parish of Ashcott was part of the Whitley Hundred.

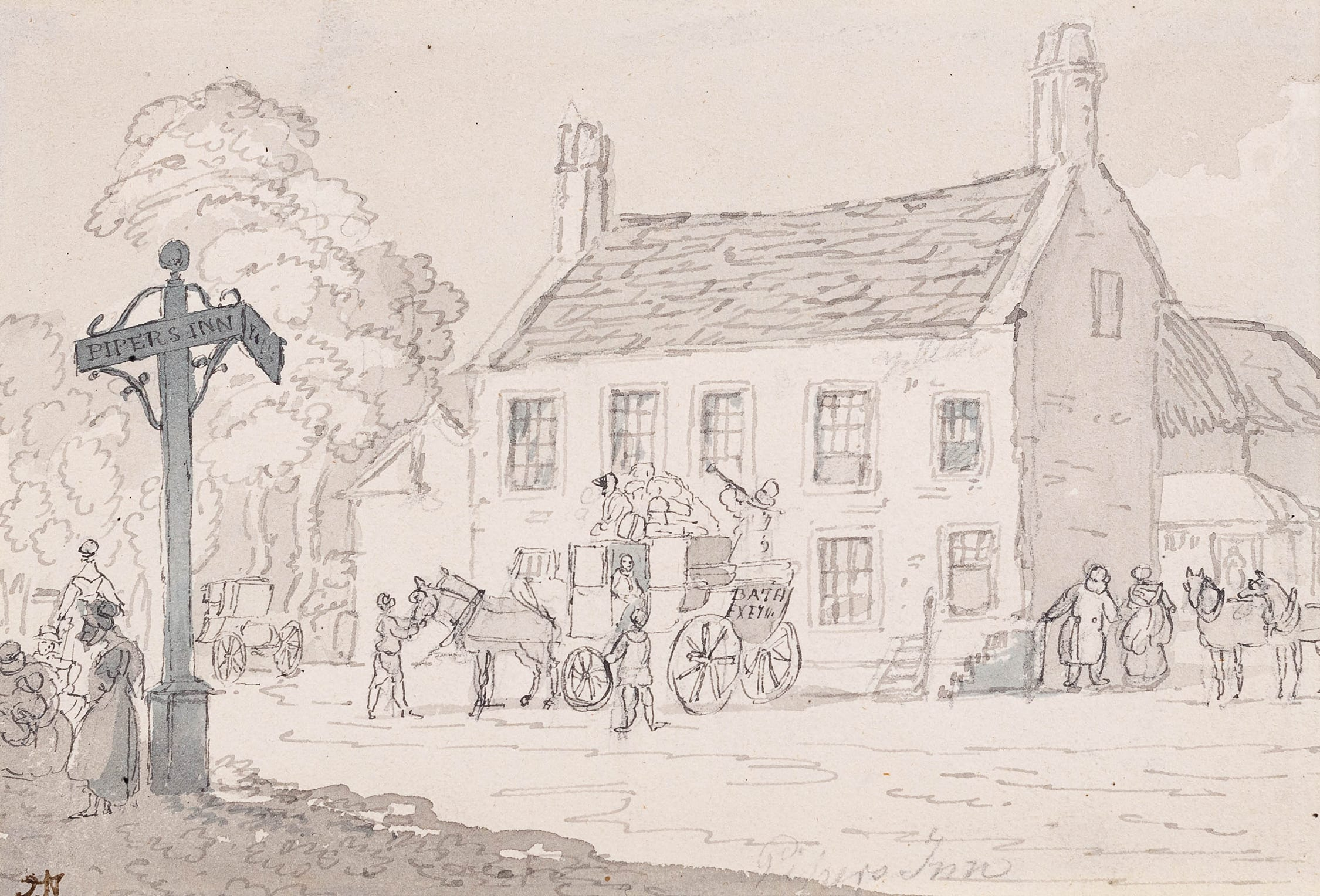
The Bath to Exeter coach at ‘The Piper’s Inn’, Ashcott, Somerset (1794) by John Nixon

The village was a stop for mail coaches running from Bath to Exeter, and later had a station on the Evercreech Junction to Burnham-on-Sea branch of the Somerset and Dorset Joint Railway. The station was two miles away from the village, and was originally called "Ashcott and Meare", reflecting the fact that Meare was also nearby (in fact, nearer). "Meare" was dropped from the official name in 1876, though the station "running board" – the large sign on the platform – continued to give the double name until the railway line closed in 1966 under the Beeching Axe.

A narrow gauge railway operated by Eclipse Peat operated from 1922 to 1983 and crossed the branch line on the level about 1/2-mile east of Ashcott station. On 29 August 1949 a train on the branch collided with a narrow gauge engine and the locomotive ended up in the adjacent Glastonbury Canal.

Marie T Lichfield grew up in the village with her family. She later became a Carmelite nun and wrote a fascinating account of life in the village before and during the Second World War in her book 'Countryside and Cloister' published in 1997.

== Governance ==
The parish council has responsibility for local issues, including setting an annual precept (local rate) to cover the council's operating costs and producing annual accounts for public scrutiny. The parish council evaluates local planning applications and works with the local police, district council officers, and neighbourhood watch groups on matters of crime, security, and traffic. The parish council's role also includes initiating projects for the maintenance and repair of parish facilities, as well as consulting with the district council on the maintenance, repair, and improvement of highways, drainage, footpaths, public transport, and street cleaning. Conservation matters (including trees and listed buildings) and environmental issues are also the responsibility of the council.

For local government purposes, since 1 April 2023, the village comes under the unitary authority of Somerset Council. Prior to this, it was part of the non-metropolitan district of Sedgemoor, which was formed on 1 April 1974 under the Local Government Act 1972, having previously been part of Bridgwater Rural District.

The village is part of 'East Polden' electoral ward. Although Ashcott is the most populous area the ward stretches to Moorlinch and Shapwick. The total population of the ward at the 2011 census was 2,130.

It is also part of the Wells and Mendip Hills constituency represented in the House of Commons of the Parliament of the United Kingdom. It elects one Member of Parliament (MP) by the first past the post system of election.

== Religious sites ==
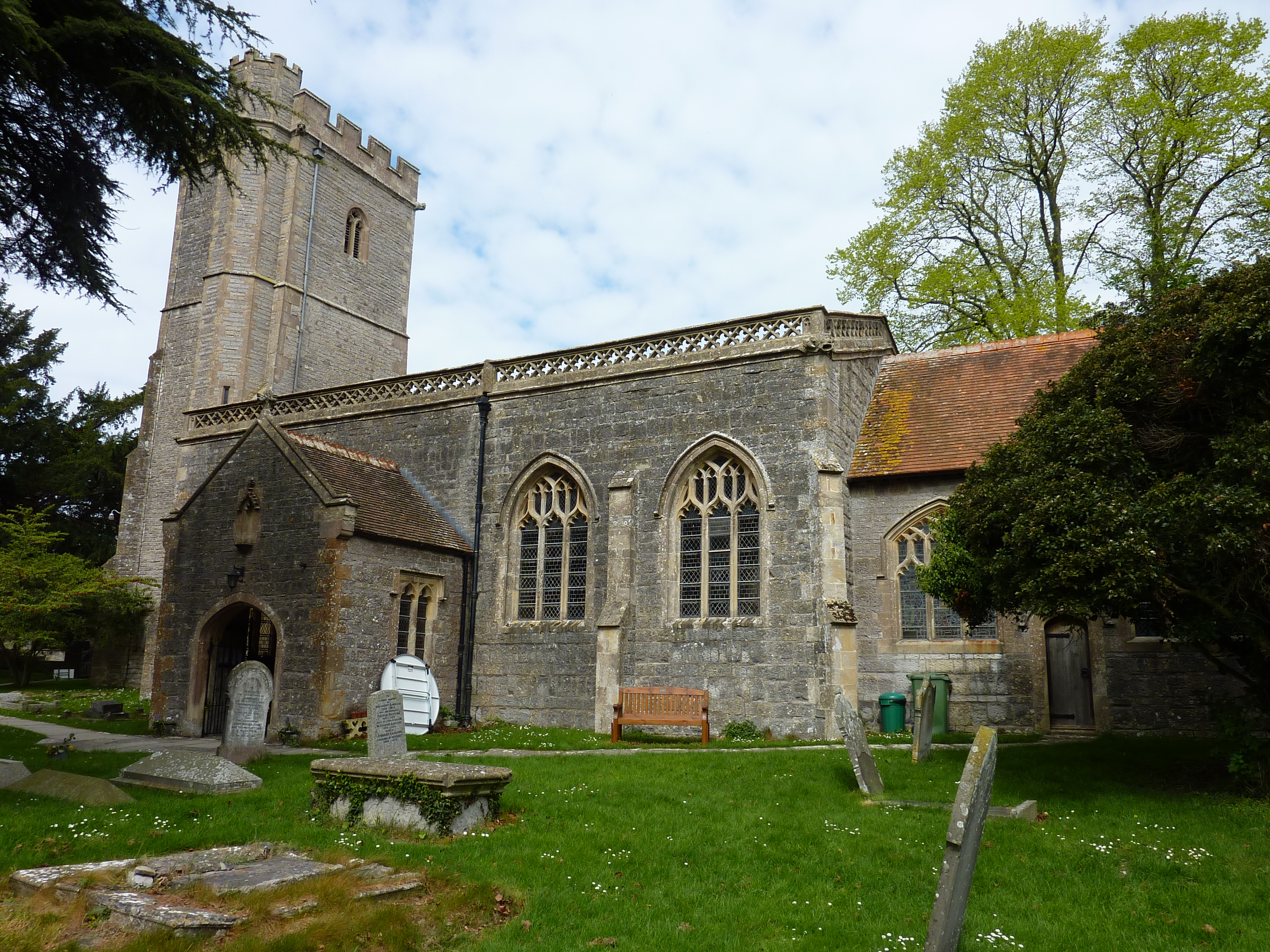
All Saints Church, Ashcott, Somerset

The Anglican parish Church of All Saints dates from the 15th century and has been designated as a Grade II* listed building.

== Notable residents ==
Ashcott was the birthplace of Joseph Trutch, a Canadian engineer, surveyor and politician. It is also the home to Bradley Middleton, former professional footballer and founder of The Levels School.
