= East Huntspill =

Village in Somerset, England

Coordinates: 51.199°N 2.941°W

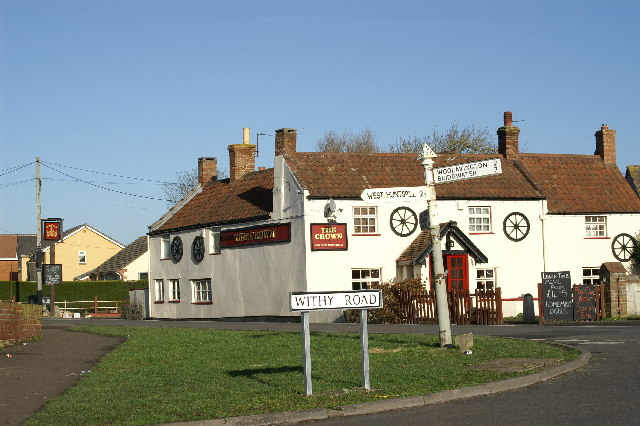
- The Crown Inn and road junction

- Location within Somerset
- Population: 1,146 (2011)
- OS grid reference: ST344454
- Civil parish: East Huntspill
- Unitary authority: Somerset Council
- Ceremonial county: Somerset
- Region: South West
- Country: England
- Sovereign state: United Kingdom
- Post town: HIGHBRIDGE
- Postcode district: TA9
- Dialling code: 01278
- Police: Avon and Somerset
- Fire: Devon and Somerset
- Ambulance: South Western
- UK Parliament: Wells and Mendip Hills

East Huntspill is a village and civil parish on the Huntspill Level, near Highbridge, Somerset, England. The civil parish includes Cote, Hackness and Bason Bridge.

The parish of East Huntspill has a population of 1,146.

== History ==
Huntspill was listed in the Domesday Book of 1086 as Honspil, meaning 'Huna's creek' possibly from the Old English personal name Huna and from the Celtic pwll.

The parish of Huntspill was part of the Huntspill and Puriton Hundred.

Three 18th-century farmhouses in East Huntspill, Hackney, New Road and Phippins, have all been designated as Grade II listed buildings.

In 1949 the civil parish of Huntspill was abolished and divided into Huntspill All Saints and West Huntspill along the line of the Bristol and Exeter Railway. The parish of Huntspill All Saints was renamed East Hunstspill in 1972.

== Governance ==
For local government purposes, since 1 April 2023, the village comes under the unitary authority of Somerset Council. Prior to this, it was part of the non-metropolitan district of Sedgemoor, which was formed on 1 April 1974 under the Local Government Act 1972, having previously been part of Bridgwater Rural District.

== Religious sites ==
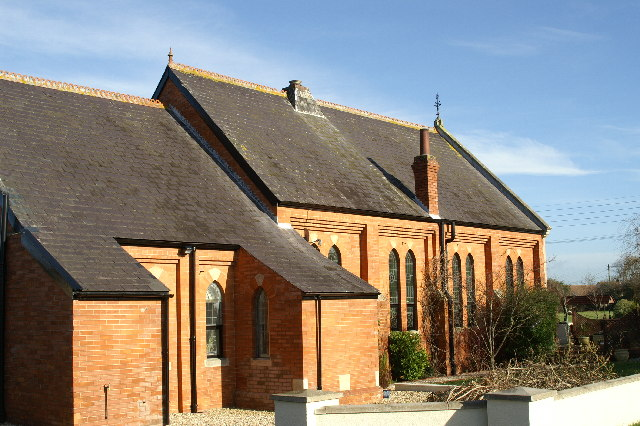
All Saints Church

The Anglican parish Church of All Saints in East Huntspill was built in 1839 by G P Manners, as a chapel-of-ease to the then parish church at Huntspill. It became the parish church in 1845, when the chapelry was formed into a parochial district, and the bell-chamber was added in the late 19th century. It has been designated as a Grade II listed building. It is on the Heritage at Risk Register because of the condition of the roof.

There was a United Methodist chapel in East Huntspill built in 1923, which replaced an earlier building in Chapel Lane. The chapel closed by 1997.

== See also ==
- Huntspill River
- River Brue
- River Parrett
