= Fiddington =

Village in Somerset, England

Coordinates: 51.158°N 3.124°W

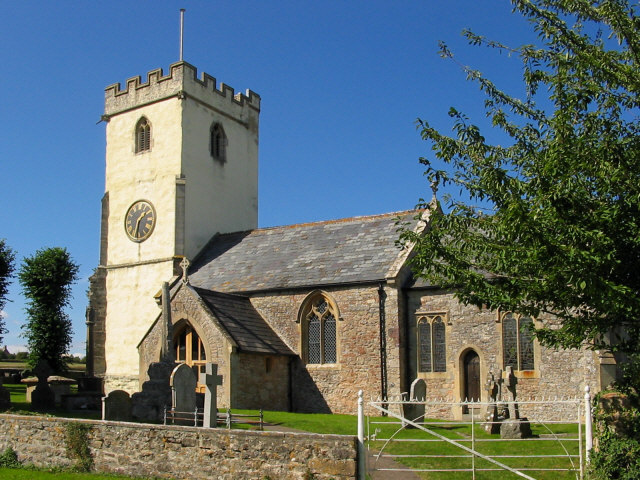
- Fiddington Church

- Location within Somerset
- Population: 298 (2011)
- OS grid reference: ST215405
- Unitary authority: Somerset Council
- Ceremonial county: Somerset
- Region: South West
- Country: England
- Sovereign state: United Kingdom
- Post town: BRIDGWATER
- Postcode district: TA5
- Dialling code: 01278
- Police: Avon and Somerset
- Fire: Devon and Somerset
- Ambulance: South Western
- UK Parliament: Bridgwater

Fiddington is a village and civil parish 2.5 miles (4 km) north-east of Nether Stowey, and 6 miles (10 km) north-west of Bridgwater in Somerset, England. The parish includes the hamlets of Bonson and Whitnell.

== Governance ==
The parish council has responsibility for local issues, including setting an annual precept (local rate) to cover the council’s operating costs and producing annual accounts for public scrutiny. The parish council evaluates local planning applications and works with the local police, district council officers, and neighbourhood watch groups on matters of crime, security, and traffic. The parish council's role also includes initiating projects for the maintenance and repair of parish facilities, as well as consulting with the district council on the maintenance, repair, and improvement of highways, drainage, footpaths, public transport, and street cleaning. Conservation matters (including trees and listed buildings) and environmental issues are also the responsibility of the council.

For local government purposes, since 1 April 2023, the village comes under the unitary authority of Somerset Council. Prior to this, it was part of the non-metropolitan district of Sedgemoor, which was formed on 1 April 1974 under the Local Government Act 1972, having previously been part of Bridgwater Rural District.

It is also part of the Bridgwater county constituency represented in the House of Commons of the Parliament of the United Kingdom. It elects one Member of Parliament (MP) by the first past the post system of election, and was part of the South West England constituency of the European Parliament prior to Britain leaving the European Union in January 2020, which elected seven MEPs using the d'Hondt method of party-list proportional representation.

== Religious sites ==
The Church of St Martin dates from the 11th century and has been designated by English Heritage as a Grade II* listed building. On the south wall of the nave is a 12 inches (30 cm) Sheela na Gig. It is unusual in having one arm aloft and the other resting on a knee. The part of the figure showing genitalia is less well defined than the upper body, possibly as a result of weathering or an attempt to obscure that part of the image at some time in the past.
