= Puriton =

Village in Somerset, England

Coordinates: 51.172°N 2.973°W

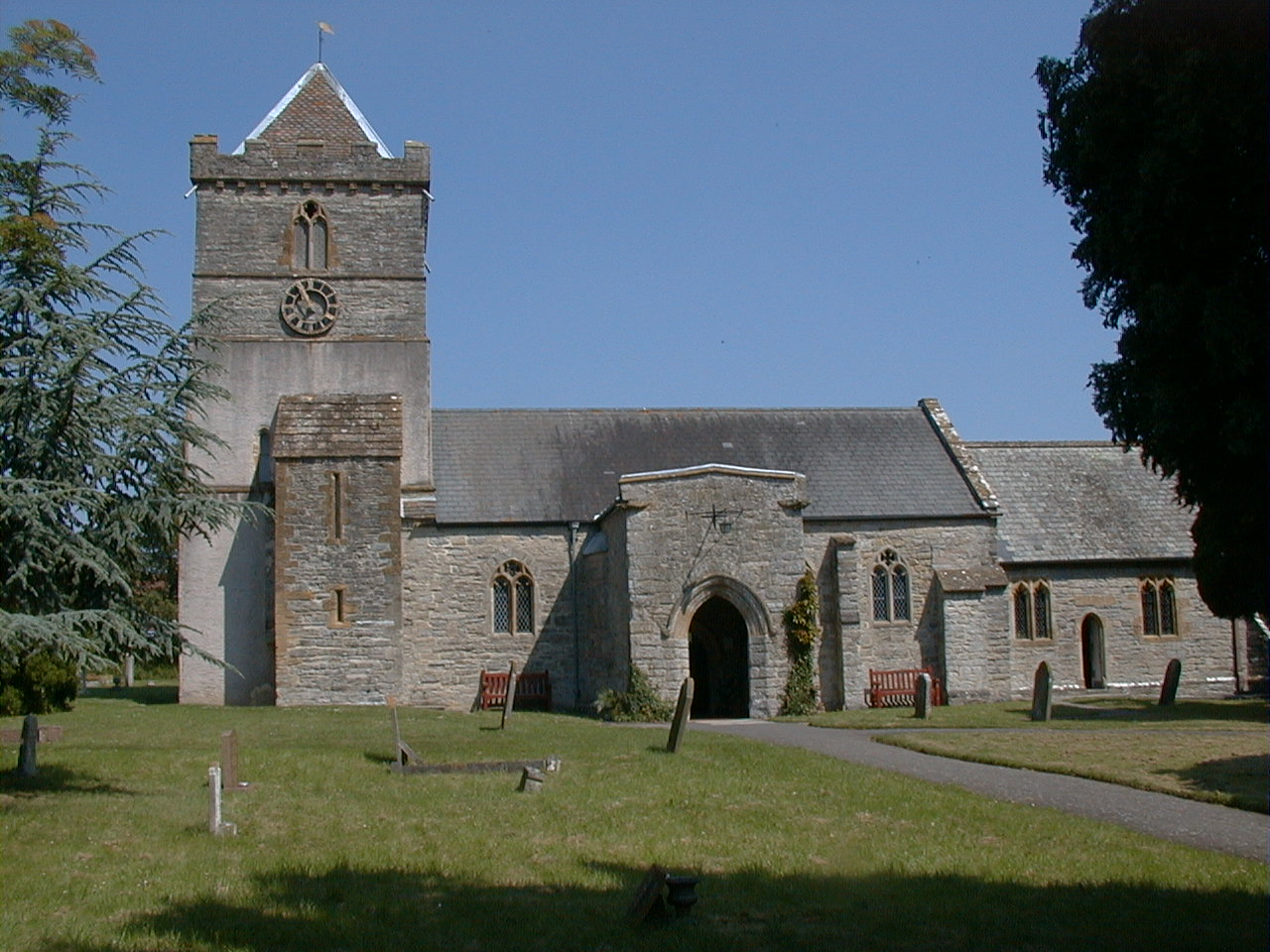
- Puriton Parish Church, constructed from local Blue Lias stone

- Location within Somerset
- Population: 1,968 (2011)
- OS grid reference: ST321415
- Unitary authority: Somerset Council
- Ceremonial county: Somerset
- Region: South West
- Country: England
- Sovereign state: United Kingdom
- Post town: BRIDGWATER
- Postcode district: TA7
- Dialling code: 01278
- Police: Avon and Somerset
- Fire: Devon and Somerset
- Ambulance: South Western
- UK Parliament: Bridgwater

Puriton is a village and parish at the westerly end of the Polden Hills, in Somerset, England. The parish has a population of 1,968. The local parish church is dedicated to St Michael and All Angels. A chapel on Woolavington Road was converted to a private house some 20 years ago. The parish includes the hamlets of Dunball and Down End.

In 1996, the village was described as "now becoming a rural commuter village". The built-up area is mostly between 5 and 50 metres above sea level.

The village has a full range of facilities, such as a primary school, parish church, pub, post office, butcher and hairdresser. It started to expand considerably in the 1960s and 1970s when new houses were built on former farm land, a former infilled stone Blue Lias quarry, Puriton Park, and on fields between the existing houses. The old Victorian school near the church was converted into homes and a new school built elsewhere. The Manor House was sold in 1960 and four houses were built on its former tennis courts; the House is in multiple occupancy.

== History ==
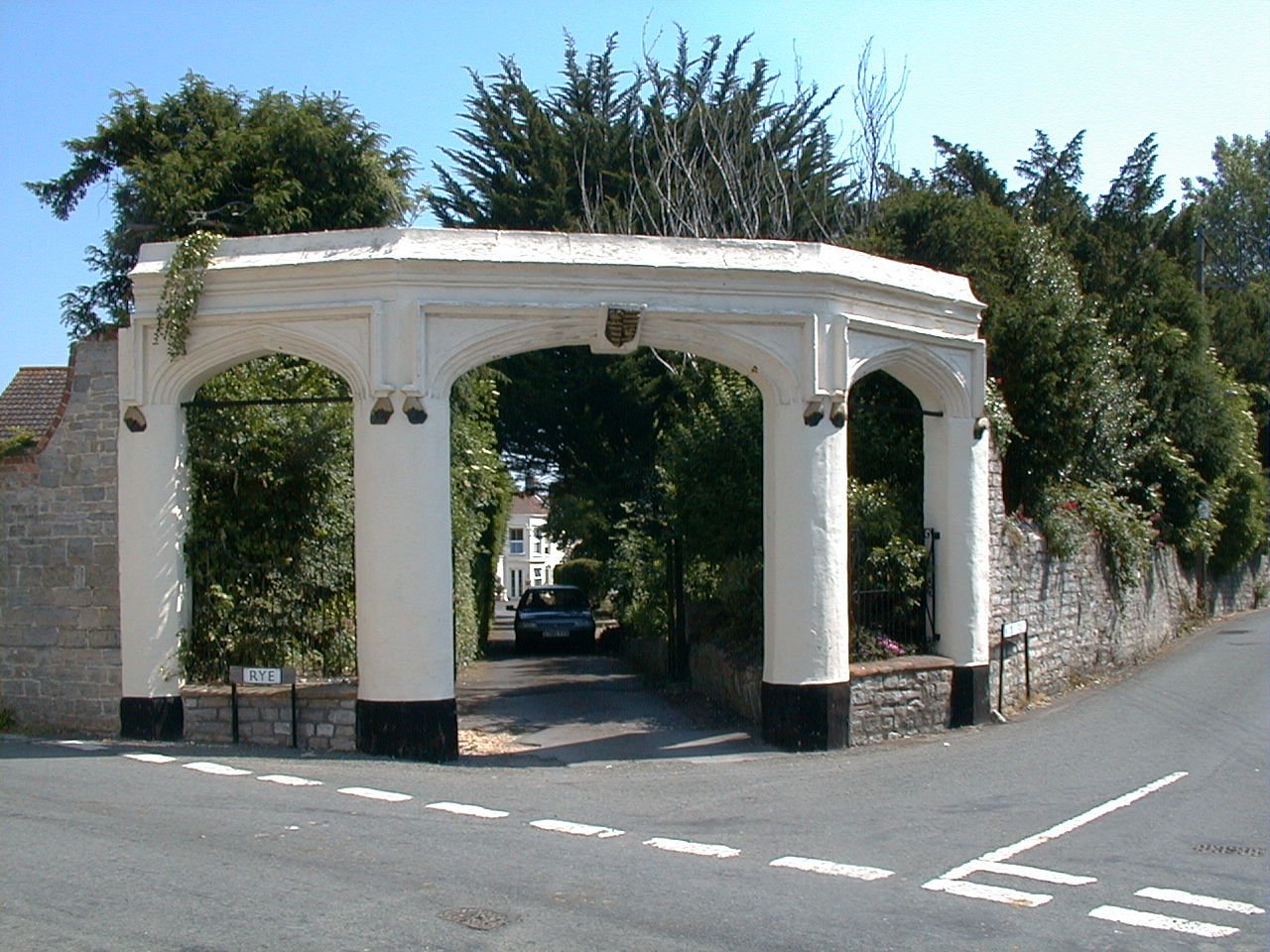
The archway to Puriton Manor House, Rye to the north (left), Middle Street to the east (right)

There is archaeological evidence of human settlement near Riverton Road, Puriton since the late iron age. In 2020, an archaeological assessment of the Gravity site also found evidence of later Iron Age and Romano- British remains.

Puriton was mentioned in the Domesday Book as growing pears, and was held by the Church of St Peter's, Rome. Its parish church was St Michael's.

Just north of Dunball is Down End which is the site of Down End Castle, a motte-and-bailey castle, which has been designated as a Scheduled Ancient Monument.

The parish was part of the Huntspill and Puriton Hundred,

=== Agriculture and industry ===
Until shortly after World War II the village still had apple and pear orchards. The village is mentioned in the Domesday Book as growing pears (1086 – Peritone 'a Pear Orchard or farmstead where Pear trees grow') and this is one possible reason for the village's name. A German pilot was captured in one of the orchards after his plane was shot down and he landed by parachute. The orchards have now all gone, houses having been built on them. The last was Culverhay, which at one time had housed both a dairy and a cider press. One working farm is still in existence.

A cement and lime works was at the western end of the Polden Hills, at Dunball. It used Blue Lias stone quarried at several locations in the village, transported to the works on narrow-gauge railways. This area of the Polden Hills was used for quarrying stone and lime burning from 1888 until 1973. Quarrying may have taken place on the hillside as early as the 15th century.

In 1910 exploration for coal discovered a 36 metres (118 ft) thick seam of Rock salt 183 metres (600 ft) beneath the mudstones. Between 1911 and 1922 this was commercially extracted by dissolving the salt with water pumped down bore holes, which was brought to the surface and evaporated in boiling pans.

In 1941, ROF Bridgwater, an explosives factory, was opened midway between Puriton and the adjacent village of Woolavington. The factory lies mostly in Puriton parish, with a small portion in Woolavington. Several million gallons of water per day were extracted from the nearby artificial Huntspill River to supply process water to the factory. After peak production in the second World War, the factory's water extraction rate became lower and the process water was returned to the Huntspill River after use, with clean-up through a reedbed sewage treatment plant. However, since the factory's closure (see paragraph below), this reedbed has been allowed to silt up. The site's former owners, BAE Systems Land and Armaments, closed the whole site in spring 2008. In 2017, it was announced by the site's current owners, a private company, the Salamanca Group, that they planned to turn it into a smart campus, called: Gravity.

The village's stone quarries began to go out of use during World War II. The cement and lime works, next to both the King's Sedgemoor Drain and the Bristol and Exeter Railway line, became run down by the early 1960s and was demolished when the M5 motorway was built through part of the site. The church, and the boundary walls, in the old part of the village, are built of blue lias blocks. Puriton Park was built over part of the site of an in-filled blue lias quarry, at the eastern end of the village.

The British Institute for the Achievement of Human Potential, which was the forerunner of British Institute for Brain Injured Children (BIBIC), moved in 1976 to a former 19th century house: Knowle Hall. The headquarters of BIBIC was to remain at Knowle Hall until 2014, when they relocated, across Somerset, to Langport. It is believed that they were unwilling to carry of burden of ongoing repair costs of what was mostly an old building.

=== Smart Campus ===
On 19 July 2023, it was confirmed that approximately half of the Gravity site would be a developed as new factory dedicated to producing Electric vehicle batteries for Tata Group's Tata Motors, the owner of Jaguar Land Rover. Construction work is ongoing.

== Governance ==
The parish council has responsibility for local issues, including setting an annual precept (local rate) to cover the council's operating costs and producing annual accounts for public scrutiny. The parish council evaluates local planning applications and works with the local police, district council officers, and neighbourhood watch groups on matters of crime, security, and traffic. The parish council's role also includes initiating projects for the maintenance and repair of parish facilities, as well as consulting with the district council on the maintenance, repair, and improvement of highways, drainage, footpaths, public transport, and street cleaning. Conservation matters (including trees and listed buildings) and environmental issues are also the responsibility of the council.

For local government purposes, since 1 April 2023, the village comes under the unitary authority of Somerset Council. Prior to this, it was part of the non-metropolitan district of Sedgemoor, which was formed on 1 April 1974 under the Local Government Act 1972, having previously been part of Bridgwater Rural District.

The village is part of the 'Puriton and Woolavington' electoral ward. This ward stretches from the River Parrett in the west to Cossington in the east. The total population of this ward at the 2011 census was 4,647.

It is part of the Bridgwater county constituency represented in the House of Commons of the Parliament of the United Kingdom. It elects one Member of Parliament (MP) by the first past the post system.

== Transport links ==
The northern end of King's Sedgemoor Drain, where it discharges into the River Parrett, lies just outside the parish boundary; it runs between the Polden Hills (to the east) and the M5 motorway (to the west).

In Roman times the course of the River Parrett near the village was very different. It had an almost-complete great loop that followed the southern flank of the Polden Hills, along the course of the present-day King's Sedgemoor Drain. Roman ships were able to dock in the lee of the Polden Hills.

Until the mid-19th century, the main road from Exeter to Bristol, via Crandon Bridge, passed through the village in front (east) of the Puriton Inn and continued along what is now Pawlett Road / Puriton Road to Pawlett and beyond. The Exeter — Bristol road is now part of the A38: and the arrow-straight section north from Bridgwater to Pawlett was built in the 1820s. It bypassed Pawlett; the old road is now known as the Old Main Road.

The village was served by a railway station at Dunball, opened in 1873 by the Bristol and Exeter Railway, downgraded to Dunball Halt by the British Transport Commission in 1961. It closed in November 1964 and has been completely removed, although the line remains open, with Bridgwater as the nearest station.

With the building of the 19th-century section of the A38 and later the M5, much of the old main road from Crandon Bridge through the village to Pawlett was partially retained as a link road to the A39, 'Bath Road'. The southeastern section from Crandon Bridge up the Polden Hill is now reused as a A39 link road to the M5 motorway. Part of the northeastern section was realigned in 1973, when the M5 motorway came through Somerset: the 19th diversion was diverted to the west of the Puriton Inn to roundabout at junction 23 of the M5. It also continues over the top of the junction 23, now as a dual carriageway link to the A38, 'Bristol Road' near Dunball wharf; with a link to Downend from just the northern carriageway. Other parts of the original road still exist as two sections of Puriton Hill and most of Puriton Road. Hall Road, Puriton, was built at the same time to link the A39 to Riverton Road, Puriton. The road between Riverton Road / Puriton Hill and Puriton Road / Downend Road was severed by the M5, being replaced by a footbridge to the hamlet of Downend. Church Field Lane was also severed by the M5, its two short sections near the M5 are unlinked.

The village is immediately east of Junction 23 of the M5, (Dunball is immediately to the west) of the M5; and since the construction of Junction 23 in the early 1970s, Puriton could be accessed via two side-roads leading directly off the A39 link road running eastwards of Junction 23 to the A39, Bath Road. The A38, Bristol road, is just over a mile away, beyond the M5 roundabout.

Since the announcement of the Gravity, smart campus, there have been major changes to A39 link road and the access routes to Puriton, Woolavington, and the road between Puriton and Woolavington. No work was allowed to start on demolishing and clearing the former ROF buildings until a direct road link between the ROF site and the A39 link was designed, built and opened: demolition and construction traffic was not allowed to access the former ROF Bridgwater site by driving through either Puriton or Woolavington. Note: Not all of this work and the associated mitigations has been completed.

== Religious sites ==
The Anglican parish Church of St Michael and All Angels was constructed from local Blue Lias stone. It has an early-13th-century tower, with the remainder dating from the 14th and 15th centuries. It has been designated a Grade I listed building.

== Puriton Party in the Park ==
Puriton hosts its own Party in the Park. It has been run annually since 2010 and takes place in the middle of August, typically from 2-10pm. The afternoon session from 2-6pm hosts a variety of stalls, rides and games for children and an arena in the field where groups from the village and beyond are invited to perform. The evening session from 6-10pm turns the field into a music concert, allowing local bands and artists the chance to perform on a lorry that has been transformed into a stage. The year 2014 saw Michael Eavis open the evening's entertainment, alongside Puriton's own Dolly Pardon (a spoof of the finale act from Glastonbury Festival 2014, Dolly Parton).

== See also ==
- ROF Bridgwater
