= Bawdrip =

Village and civil parish in Somerset, England

Coordinates: 51.153°N 2.942°W

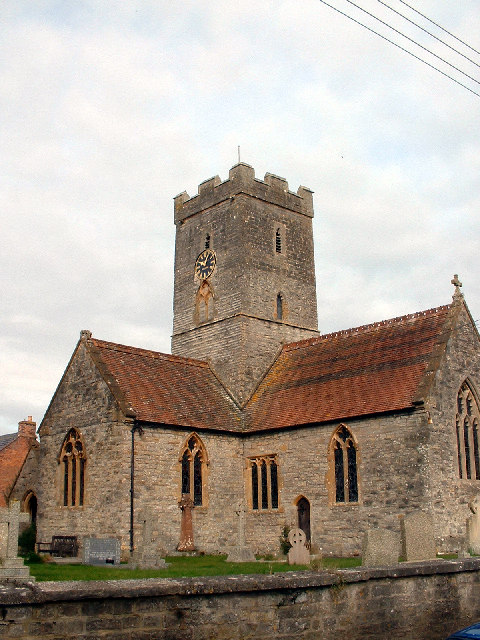
- Church of St Michael and All Angels, Bawdrip

- Location within Somerset
- Population: 506
- OS grid reference: ST340395
- Unitary authority: Somerset Council
- Ceremonial county: Somerset
- Region: South West
- Country: England
- Sovereign state: United Kingdom
- Post town: BRIDGWATER
- Postcode district: TA7
- Dialling code: 01278
- Police: Avon and Somerset
- Fire: Devon and Somerset
- Ambulance: South Western
- UK Parliament: Bridgwater

Bawdrip is a village and civil parish in Somerset, England. The village is on the south side of the Polden Hills about 4 miles (6.4 km) north-east of Bridgwater. At the 2011 census the parish had a population of 506. The parish includes the hamlets of Bradney, Horsey and Knowle.

== History ==
Some sources claim that in 1800, the iron age Polden Hill Hoard was found on Knowle Hill in the parish of Bawdrip, although other sources suggest the hoard was found in the near by village of Edington. The hoard is held in the British Museum's collection.

In 1086, Domesday Book recorded a settlement at Bagetrepe with 27 households and one mill, and another at Hursi with 19 households, both in North Petherton hundred.

There may have been quarrying on the hillside in the 15th century and Blue Lias was dug in the early 19th century. Lime was being extracted and processed in the extreme western tip of the parish under Puriton Hill by 1886 and until 1973 in association with the cement works at Dunball. Salt was extracted in the early 20th century.

The small building on Church Road, sometimes known as "The Dwarf's House" dates from the early 19th century. It is 13 feet (4.0 m) by 9 feet (2.7 m) and 13 feet (4.0 m) high.

King's Sedgemoor Drain crosses the parish from south-east to north-west.

== Governance ==
The parish council has responsibility for local issues, including setting an annual precept (local rate) to cover the council's operating costs and producing annual accounts for public scrutiny. The parish council evaluates local planning applications and works with the local police, district council officers, and neighbourhood watch groups on matters of crime, security, and traffic. The parish council's role also includes initiating projects for the maintenance and repair of parish facilities, as well as consulting with the district council on the maintenance, repair, and improvement of highways, drainage, footpaths, public transport, and street cleaning. Conservation matters (including trees and listed buildings) and environmental issues are also the responsibility of the council.

For local government purposes, since 1 April 2023, the village comes under the unitary authority of Somerset Council. Prior to this, it was part of the non-metropolitan district of Sedgemoor, which was formed on 1 April 1974 under the Local Government Act 1972, having previously been part of Bridgwater Rural District.

It is also part of the Bridgwater county constituency represented in the House of Commons of the Parliament of the United Kingdom. It elects one Member of Parliament (MP) by the first past the post system of election, and was part of the South West England constituency of the European Parliament prior to Britain leaving the European Union in January 2020, which elected seven MEPs using the d'Hondt method of party-list proportional representation.

== Transport ==
Bawdrip lies just off the A39 approximately 2 miles (3.2 km) from its junction with the M5 motorway.

It formerly had a railway station, Bawdrip Halt on the Somerset and Dorset Joint Railway, giving rail access to Bridgwater and Glastonbury; the halt opened in October 1923 and was closed on 1 December 1952.

== Religious sites ==
The Church of St Michael and All Angels dates predominantly form the late 13th and early 14th century, but underwent extensive restoration in 1866. The nearby 19th-century rectory has been suggested as one of the sites for the Legend of the Mistletoe Bough.

== Education ==
A village school was opened in 1870 and became a council school in 1913. Prior to that, village education came from Sunday schools, for which records date back to 1763.

Present-day Kingsmoor Primary School is located within Bawdrip Central Business District, on Church road. The school has approximately 170 pupils at any one time, six classrooms, outdoor space including a partial climbing wall and play equipment, and wooden shelters against the sun and rain.

The village is in the catchment area for East Bridgwater Community School in Eastover (formally known as the secondary modern, Sydenham), and most of the houses are far enough away to qualify for free bus transport.
