= Hundred of Andersfield =

Historical Hundred of Somerset, England

Andersfield
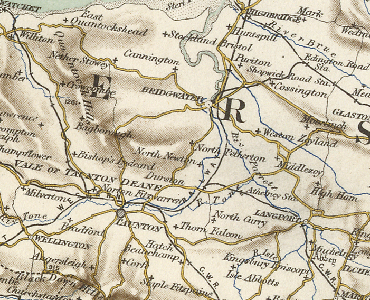
- Map of the Hundred
- Area
- 10,000 acres (4,000 ha)
- Status: Hundred
- Subdivisions
  - Type: Parishes
  - Units: Broomfield, Chilton Trinity, Creech St Michael, Durleigh, Enmore, Goathurst, Lyng and the Petherton limit tithing of North Petherton

The Hundred of Andersfield is one of the 40 historical Hundreds in the ceremonial county of Somerset, England, dating from before the Norman conquest during the Anglo-Saxon era although exact dates are unknown.

== Area ==
Andersfield covered an area of approximately 10,000 acres (4,000 ha) and had over 500 houses according to the 1851 census. It contained the parishes of Broomfield, Chilton Trinity, Creech St Michael, Durleigh, Enmore, Goathurst, Lyng and, from the 1670s, the Petherton limit tithing of North Petherton.
