= Woolavington =

Coordinates: 51.175°N 2.933°W

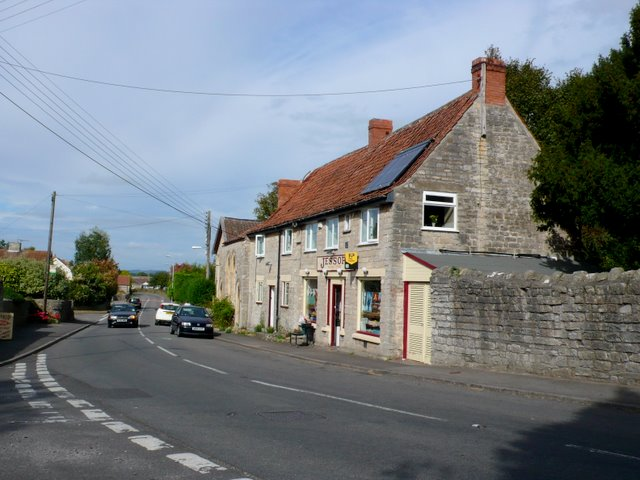
- Woolavington village store

- Location within Somerset
- Population: 2,115 (2011)
- OS grid reference: ST3441
- Civil parish: Woolavington
- Unitary authority: Somerset Council
- Ceremonial county: Somerset
- Region: South West
- Country: England
- Sovereign state: United Kingdom
- Post town: BRIDGWATER
- Postcode district: TA7
- Dialling code: 01278
- Police: Avon and Somerset
- Fire: Devon and Somerset
- Ambulance: South Western
- UK Parliament: Bridgwater

Woolavington is a village and civil parish on the Somerset Levels in the English county of Somerset. It is 5.2 miles (8.4 km) north east of Bridgwater, 7.2 miles (11.6 km) south east of Burnham on Sea and 11.9 miles (19.2 km) west of Glastonbury. At the 2021 census it had a population of 2,325.

== History ==
Known as Hunlavintone in the Domesday Book of 1086, the village's name means 'the settlement of Hunlaf's people'. The parish of Woolavington was historically part of the Whitley Hundred.

Close to the village is the Royal Ordnance Factory ROF Bridgwater, a factory which produced high explosives for munitions from 1941 until its closure in 2008.

== Governance ==
For local government purposes, since 1 April 2023, the village comes under the unitary authority of Somerset Council. Prior to this, it was part of the non-metropolitan district of Sedgemoor, which was formed on 1 April 1974 under the Local Government Act 1972, having previously been part of Bridgwater Rural District.

It is also part of the Bridgwater county constituency represented in the House of Commons of the Parliament of the United Kingdom. It elects one Member of Parliament (MP) by the first past the post system of election.

== Religious sites ==
The Anglican parish Church of St Mary has 11th-century origins and is a Grade I listed building. In the early 12th century it was granted to Goldcliff Priory in Monmouthshire by its founder Robert de Chandos who was lord of the manor of Woolavington. In the 15th century it passed to the canons of Windsor.

== Local economy ==
The village is close to the UK's first "gigafactory", under construction as of 2026, which when complete is expected to provide around 7,500 jobs. BBC News has speculated that Woolavington could potentially "double in size" with the construction of 1,550 new homes as part of the development.

== Notable residents ==
In 1807 it was the birthplace of the Reverend George Andrew Jacob and in 1812 his brother John Jacob, who became an officer of the Honourable East India Company's Bombay Army and was the founder of the city of Jacobabad in Pakistan, where his tomb is still maintained as a public monument.
