= Lyng, Somerset =

Civil parish in Somerset, England

Coordinates: 51.053°N 2.959°W

Lyng
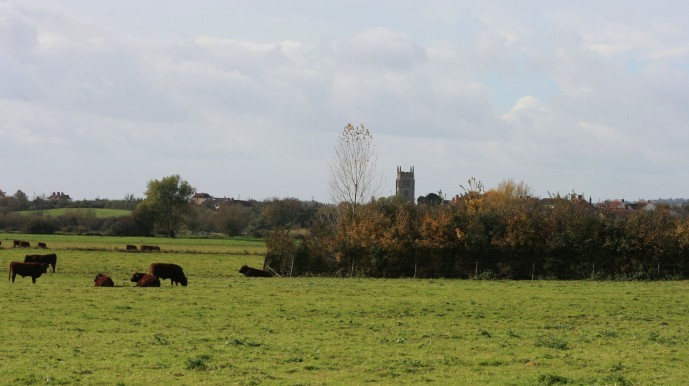
- View of East Lyng across the levels

- Location within Somerset
- Population: 338
- OS grid reference: ST328287
- Unitary authority: Somerset Council
- Ceremonial county: Somerset
- Region: South West
- Country: England
- Sovereign state: United Kingdom
- Post town: TAUNTON
- Postcode district: TA3
- Dialling code: 01823
- Police: Avon and Somerset
- Fire: Devon and Somerset
- Ambulance: South Western
- UK Parliament: Bridgwater

Lyng is a civil parish in Somerset, England, comprising the villages of West Lyng and East Lyng and the hamlet of Bankland.

== History ==
The name derives from the Old English hlenc, meaning hill.

Nearby Athelney is famous for being the refuge of King Alfred the Great from the Danes before the Battle of Ethandun in 878, and the site of a monastery he founded after his victory.

East Lyng is on higher ground towards the west of Athelney. Archaeological research suggests East Lyng was a medieval settlement, and was an important fortified burh during Saxon times, hence the usage of the East Lyng burh and Athelney by King Alfred the Great and his army. The Balt Moor Wall dates to this period.

By the time of the Domesday census completed in 1086, Lyng was described as a small rural settlement. In 1267 a charter for a market was granted, but is no longer recorded by 1349. Despite this the settlement at East Lyng retained burh status and was recorded as such in 1498–99.

Lyng was part of the hundred of Andersfield.

== Governance ==
The parish council has responsibility for local issues, including setting an annual precept (local rate) to cover the council's operating costs and producing annual accounts for public scrutiny; it also evaluates local planning applications and works with the local police, district council officers, and neighbourhood watch groups on matters of crime, security, and traffic. Its role also includes initiating projects for the maintenance and repair of parish facilities, as well as consulting with the district council on the maintenance, repair, and improvement of highways, drainage, footpaths, public transport, and street cleaning. Conservation matters (including trees and listed buildings) and environmental issues are also the responsibility of the council.

For local government purposes, since 1 April 2023, the civil parish comes under the unitary authority of Somerset Council. Prior to this, it was part of the non-metropolitan district of Sedgemoor, which was formed on 1 April 1974 under the Local Government Act 1972, having previously been part of Bridgwater Rural District.

It is also part of the Bridgwater county constituency represented in the House of Commons of the Parliament of the United Kingdom. It elects one Member of Parliament (MP) by the first past the post system of election.

== Geography ==
The villages occupy an east–west ridge within the Somerset Levels, with Hitchings Moor and Salt Moor to the north, and Curry Moor adjoining the River Tone to the south. The ridge falls to the east, ending at Athelney Hill near the confluence of the River Tone and River Parrett at Burrowbridge. North Moor is a biological Site of Special Scientific Interest because of its nationally important grazing marsh and ditch system on the Somerset Levels and Moors. A range of neutral grassland types supporting common and scarce plants has developed mainly due to variations in soils and management practices. Aquatic plant communities are exceptionally diverse with good populations of nationally scarce species. The site has special interest in its bird life.

== Transport ==
The ridge across the Somerset Levels has always been important for transport links. Today it carries the A361 road from Taunton to Street, and the Great Western Railway London Paddington to Penzance main line. The railway originally cut through the ridge just west of East Lyng, and traversed Hitchings Moor, but after years of being blocked by winter floods, the railway was diverted south of the ridge to join the line from Bristol at Cogload Junction.

== Religious sites ==
The current church at East Lyng, which is dedicated to St Bartholomew, is thought to have been built by the monks who were displaced from Athelney Abbey when it was dissolved by King Henry VIII of England in 1539. The ornate three-stage tower is of lias with hamstone dressings supported by set-back buttresses connected diagonally across the angles of the tower on the bottom two stages; these terminate as diagonal pinnacles on shafts at the third stage. The paired two-light bell-chamber windows have Somerset tracery flanked by attached shafts and pinnacles, with quatrefoil grilles. There are similar single windows on the stage below.

The East Lyng churchyard contains the grave of George Marston who was the artist for Ernest Shackleton's 1914 Endurance Trans-Antarctic Expedition.
