= Northover, Somerset =

Former village and suburb of Glastonbury in Somerset, England

Coordinates: 51.1410°N 2.7346°W

Northover is a former village, now a suburb of Glastonbury in the county of Somerset, England.
