= Chedzoy =

Village in Somerset, England

Coordinates: 51.133192°N 2.944649°W

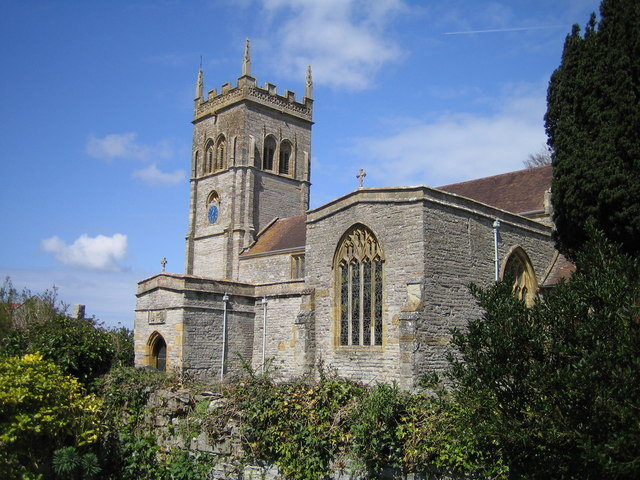
- Church of St Mary, Chedzoy

- Location within Somerset
- Population: 404 (2011)
- OS grid reference: ST335376
- Unitary authority: Somerset Council
- Ceremonial county: Somerset
- Region: South West
- Country: England
- Sovereign state: United Kingdom
- Post town: BRIDGWATER
- Postcode district: TA7
- Dialling code: 01278
- Police: Avon and Somerset
- Fire: Devon and Somerset
- Ambulance: South Western
- UK Parliament: Bridgwater

Chedzoy (alternatively Chedzey) is a civil parish village 3 miles (4.8 km) east of Bridgwater in Somerset, England.

== History ==
The village is at the western end of King's Sedgemoor and lies on an 'island' of Burtle marine sands, close to King's Sedgemoor Drain. The area was settled possibly in the Mesolithic period, and timber trackways from the 3rd to 1st millennium B.C. provided routes to other settlements on the Somerset Levels. Roman artifacts have been found in the parish.

The village is very close to the site of the 1685 Battle of Sedgemoor.

The name of the village is pronounced "Chidgey" or "Chedzey", and derives its name from being Cedd's Island. The "zoy" part of the name being derived from eg or ieg meaning island.

== Governance ==
The parish council has responsibility for local issues, including setting an annual precept (local rate) to cover the council's operating costs and producing annual accounts for public scrutiny. The parish council evaluates local planning applications and works with the local police, district council officers, and neighbourhood watch groups on matters of crime, security, and traffic. The parish council's role also includes initiating projects for the maintenance and repair of parish facilities, as well as consulting with the district council on the maintenance, repair, and improvement of highways, drainage, footpaths, public transport, and street cleaning. Conservation matters (including trees and listed buildings) and environmental issues are also the responsibility of the council.

For local government purposes, since 1 April 2023, the village comes under the unitary authority of Somerset Council. Prior to this, it was part of the non-metropolitan district of Sedgemoor, which was formed on 1 April 1974 under the Local Government Act 1972, having previously been part of Bridgwater Rural District.

It is also part of the Bridgwater county constituency represented in the House of Commons of the Parliament of the United Kingdom. It elects one Member of Parliament (MP) by the first past the post system of election, and was part of the South West England constituency of the European Parliament prior to Britain leaving the European Union in January 2020, which elected seven MEPs.

== Religious sites ==
The church of St Mary dates from the 13th century and has been designated by English Heritage as a grade I listed building. It still bears marks allegedly from the forces of the Duke of Monmouth during the Monmouth Rebellion, who are claimed to have asharpened their swords before battle.
