= Moorlinch =

Village in Somerset, England

Coordinates: 51.127°N 2.860°W

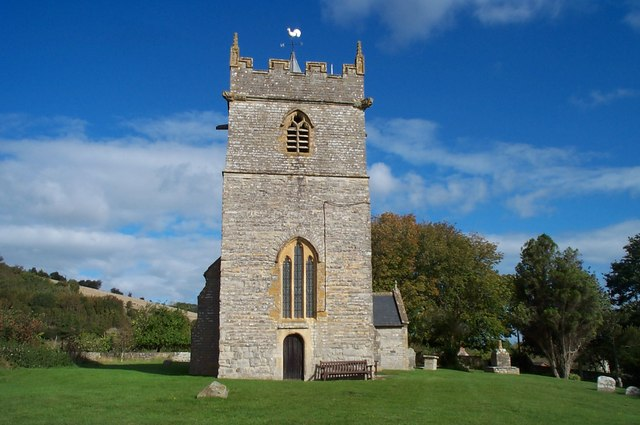
- St. Mary's Church

- Location within Somerset
- Population: 408 (2011)
- OS grid reference: ST399367
- Unitary authority: Somerset Council
- Ceremonial county: Somerset
- Region: South West
- Country: England
- Sovereign state: United Kingdom
- Post town: BRIDGWATER
- Postcode district: TA7
- Dialling code: 01458
- Police: Avon and Somerset
- Fire: Devon and Somerset
- Ambulance: South Western
- UK Parliament: Wells and Mendip Hills

Moorlinch is a village and civil parish where the Polden Hills meet the Somerset Levels in Somerset, England.

== History ==
The village was known as Mirieling in 971 and the name is believed to come from the Saxon myrge and hlinc meaning pleasant hill.

The parish of Moorlinch was part of the Whitley Hundred.

Moorlinch formed part of the Polden Estate held by Glastonbury Abbey from Saxon times until the dissolution of the monasteries in 1539. Then is descended with Shapwick manor to the Rolle family.

In 1900 the village windmill was demolished and the machinery moved to Ashton windmill in Chapel Allerton.

== Governance ==
The parish meeting has responsibility for local issues, including setting an annual precept (local rate) although it is one of only two parishes in Bridgwater District which do not raise any levy on its residents. The parish meeting evaluates local planning applications and works with the local police, district council officers, and neighbourhood watch groups on matters of crime, security, and traffic. The parish meetings role also includes initiating projects for the maintenance and repair of parish facilities, as well as consulting with the district council on the maintenance, repair, and improvement of highways, drainage, footpaths, public transport, and street cleaning. Conservation matters (including trees and listed buildings) and environmental issues are also the responsibility of the council.

For local government purposes, since 1 April 2023, the village comes under the unitary authority of Somerset Council. Prior to this, it was part of the non-metropolitan district of Sedgemoor, which was formed on 1 April 1974 under the Local Government Act 1972, having previously been part of Bridgwater Rural District.

It is also part of the Wells and Mendip Hills constituency represented in the House of Commons of the Parliament of the United Kingdom. It elects one Member of Parliament (MP) by the first past the post system of election.

== Geography ==
Moorlinch SSSI is part of the extensive grazing marsh grasslands and ditch systems of the Somerset Levels and Moors. Lying in the Parrett Basin at the foot of the Polden Hills, the area drains by gravity into the King’s Sedgemoor Drain.

== Religious sites ==
The Church of St Mary dates from the 13th century and has been designated by English Heritage as a Grade I listed building.
