= Pawlett =

Village in Somerset, England

Coordinates: 51.180°N 3.002°W

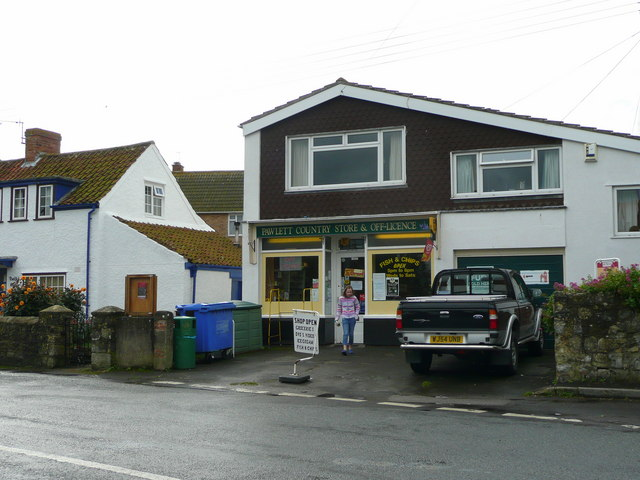
- Pawlett village shop

- Location within Somerset
- Population: 1,038 (2011)
- OS grid reference: ST300428
- Unitary authority: Somerset Council
- Ceremonial county: Somerset
- Region: South West
- Country: England
- Sovereign state: United Kingdom
- Post town: BRIDGWATER
- Postcode district: TA6
- Dialling code: 01278
- Police: Avon and Somerset
- Fire: Devon and Somerset
- Ambulance: South Western
- UK Parliament: Bridgwater

Pawlett is a village and civil parish 4 miles (6 km) north of Bridgwater, in the English county of Somerset. The parish includes the hamlet of Stretcholt.

The village has Roman or Saxon origins. It has a Norman church and expanded in the 17th and 18th centuries with the draining of the Somerset Levels.

During World War II it was the site of an experimental research station into anti-barrage balloon warfare, where experiments were performed to examine ways to use cable cutting devices on the wings of aircraft to sever the cable on which the balloon was flown and thus allow the aircraft to continue on a mission unimpeded. Brave pilots flew their machines into cables to test the effectiveness of these cutters.

== History ==
A survey in 2003 recorded an early system of flood banks in the "Hams" around the village which may have originated in the Roman or Saxon periods. An early field system was also identified, again possibly originating in the Saxon period. The Pawlett Hams form part of the Bridgwater Bay Site of Special Scientific Interest.

A small settlement of six households was recorded as Pavelet in the 1086 Domesday Book. In the 12th century the Pawlett Hams, running west of the village, were known as being the richest 2,000 acres (8 km^{2}) in England.

The name of the village is believed to come from an 11th-century estate and may refer to a stream, either with stakes or below a steep-sided hill.

The village lies on a bend of the River Parrett near to its mouth and had a landing place, called Pawlett pill, by the 15th century. It continued in use in the 18th century, but by 1780 it had been blocked by Canham sluice as part of the drainage of the Somerset Levels. In the 19th century Pawlett had a jury of sewers to view rhynes and ditches, and by 1936 the parish had its own water board to supervise drainage and freshwater irrigation of the Hams. This was absorbed into the Bridgwater and Pawlett drainage board in 1946.

In 1801 the population was 429, rising to 433 in 1811 and to 529 in 1821 when there were only 69 houses for 98 families. Numbers peaked at 597 in 1871, but fell from 483 in 1891 and to 346 in 1901. The population thereafter increased to 374 in 1911, 462 in 1931, 672 in 1961, and 786 in 1981.

A village school, supported by Anthony Ashley-Cooper, 1st Earl of Shaftesbury, was established in the late 18th century. Shaftesbury held the subsidiary title of 2nd Baron of Pawlett. In 1861, a National School was established near the church. A school board for the parish was elected in 1887 and built a school on the National School site in 1888. In 1903 there were 58 children on the register and despite some fluctuations during the intervening years there were 53 children aged 5 to 11 on the books in 1975 and 75 in 1981. A new County School opened west of the village in 1977 to replace the old building.

During the Second World War defences were constructed around Pawlett as a part of British anti-invasion preparations of World War II; nearby Pawlett Hill was a defended locality on the Taunton Stop Line, where the defences mainly comprise a number of pillboxes. There was also a RAF station used for carrying out experiments relating to barrage balloons. The hangar measures 100 feet (30 m) x 70 feet (21 m) x 80 feet (24 m) high and was erected in 1940–41 The hangar was needed so that the balloon being tested need not be deflated each night. The balloon was filled with a mixture of air and hydrogen made at the Weston-super-Mare gasworks. The experimental work continued until 1944. A Bristol Blenheim bomber crashed in the village during the war and the remains were excavated in 2007.

== Governance ==
The parish council has responsibility for local issues, including setting an annual precept (local rate) to cover the council’s operating costs and producing annual accounts for public scrutiny. The parish council evaluates local planning applications and works with the local police, district council officers, and neighbourhood watch groups on matters of crime, security, and traffic. The parish council's role also includes initiating projects for the maintenance and repair of parish facilities, as well as consulting with the district council on the maintenance, repair, and improvement of highways, drainage, footpaths, public transport, and street cleaning. Conservation matters (including trees and listed buildings) and environmental issues are also the responsibility of the council.

For local government purposes, since 1 April 2023, the village comes under the unitary authority of Somerset Council. Prior to this, it was part of the non-metropolitan district of Sedgemoor, which was formed on 1 April 1974 under the Local Government Act 1972, having previously been part of Bridgwater Rural District.

It is also part of the Bridgwater county constituency represented in the House of Commons of the Parliament of the United Kingdom. It elects one Member of Parliament (MP) by the first past the post system of election.

== Church ==
The Norman Church of John the Baptist replaced an earlier Saxon structure and the church is thought to have been a popular station on medieval pilgrimages from Watchet to Glastonbury. The south doorway arch features three bands of decoration: lozenges, zigzags, and a biting beasts motif on the outer ring. The baptismal font appears to be made from two separate fonts, the bottom part an inverted Saxon font topped with an upright plain Norman font.

The rood screen is 15th-century. The 20th-century north window shows Christ blessing children who are in modern dress and holding a teddy bear and toy boat. Other unusual features include pew boxes that retain hat pegs, reflecting a time when congregants wore hats to church. The chancel includes wide communion rails on three sides, thought to have been used for seated communion. Unusual and ancient features of the church in part owe their preservation to major renovations made in 1779. That "modernization" seems to have slaked the zeal for Victorian-era updates which eliminated such features in many other churches in the area. Crumbling of the church's blue lias stone led to its exterior being coated with cement. It has been designated by English Heritage as a Grade I listed building.

== Notable people ==
Peter Haggett CBE ScD FBA (b. 1933), academic geographer, emeritus professor at University of Bristol, was born in Pawlett.

== Gallery ==
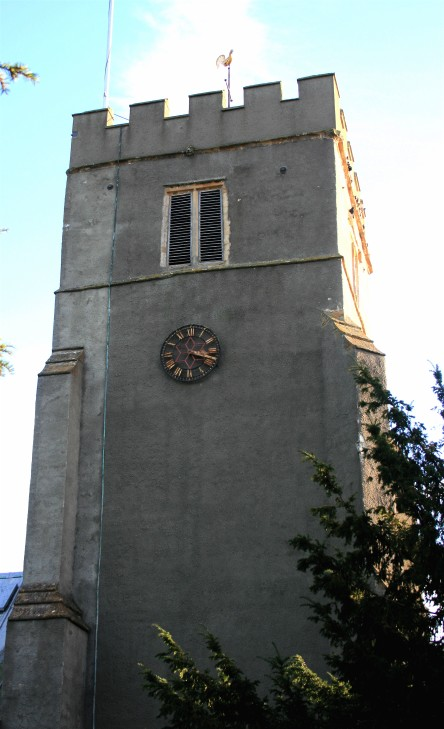
Bell tower of St John the Baptist church, Pawlett

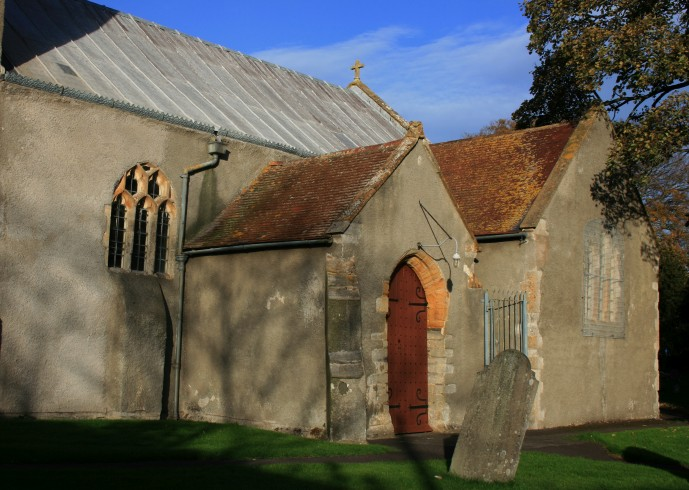
South side of St John the Baptist church

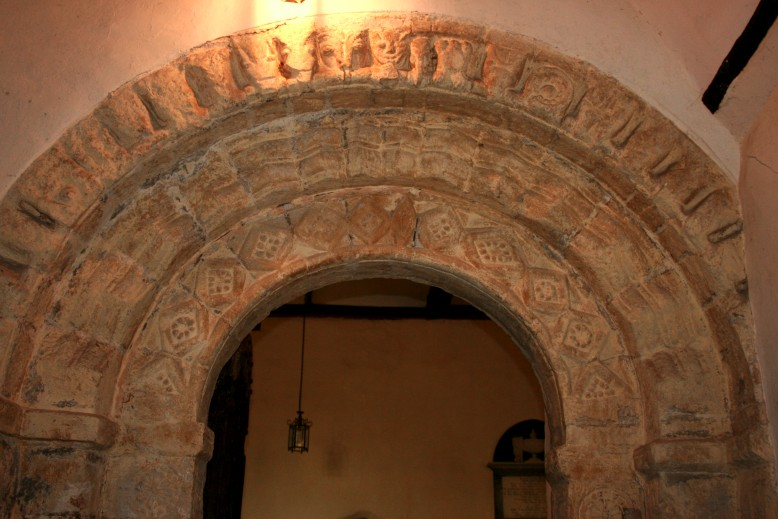
Norman arch over south door, St John the Baptist church

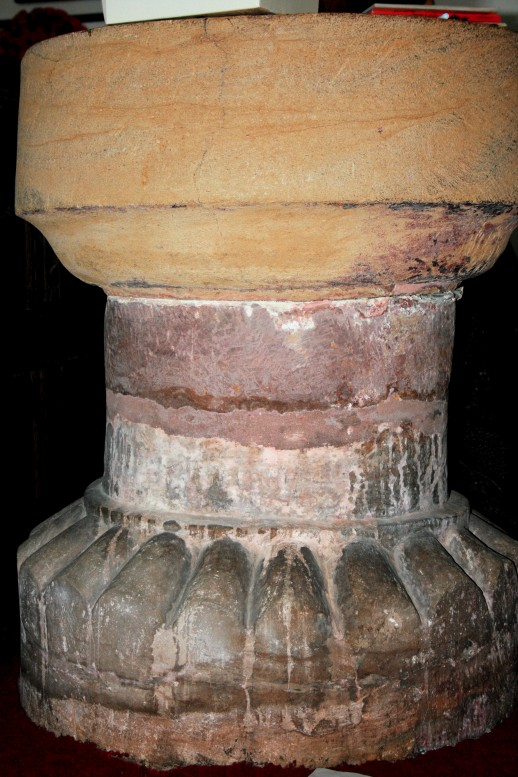
Inverted Saxon baptismal font supporting upright Norman font

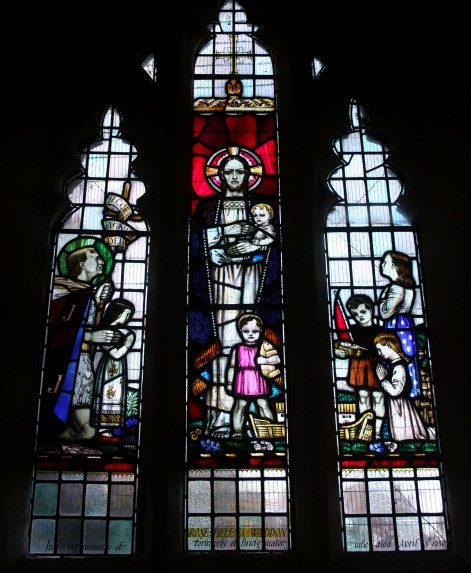
North window stained glass with modern-era children memorializes Rose Helena Wadden, said to have taught the first children's Sunday School class in Bridgwater

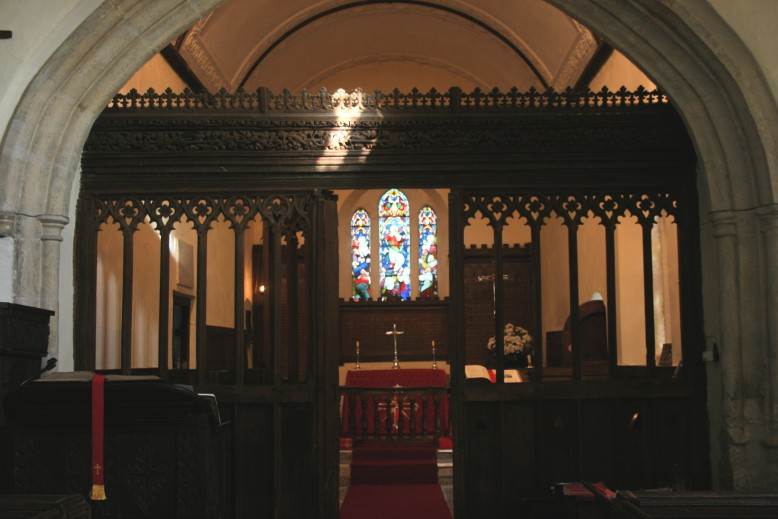
Rood screen and altar

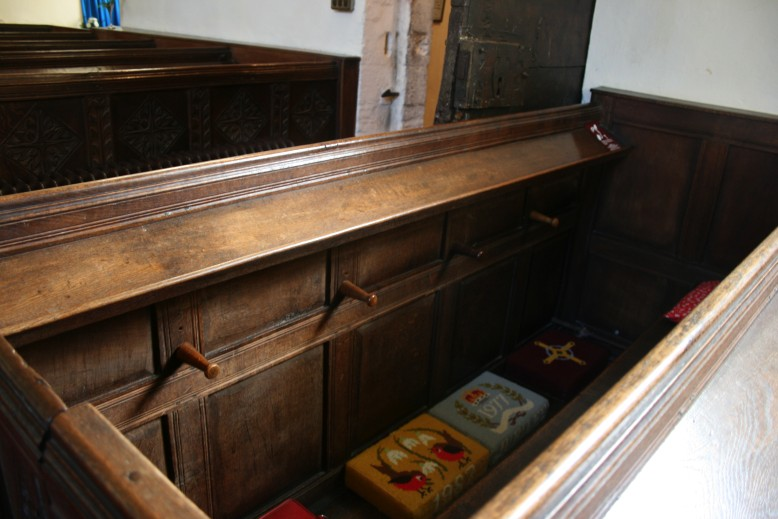
Pew boxes still include pegs for hanging up hats
