= TA postcode area =

Postcode area within the United Kingdom

Taunton
- Postcode area
- Coordinates: 51.056°N 3.070°W
- Country: United Kingdom
- Postcode area: TA
- Postcode area name: Taunton
- Post towns: 19
- Postcode districts: 24
- Postcode sectors: 67
- Postcodes (live): 11,711
- Postcodes (total): 14,693
- Statistics as at May 2020

The TA postcode area, also known as the Taunton postcode area, is a group of 24 postcode districts in South West England, within 19 post towns. These cover western Somerset (including Taunton, Bridgwater, Burnham-on-Sea, Chard, Crewkerne, Dulverton, Highbridge, Hinton St George, Ilminster, Langport, Martock, Merriott, Minehead, Montacute, Somerton, South Petherton, Stoke-sub-Hamdon, Watchet and Wellington), plus very small parts of Dorset and Devon.

== Coverage ==
The approximate coverage of the postcode districts:

Postcode district	Post town	Coverage	Local authority area(s)
TA1	TAUNTON	Taunton (south and town centre), Comeytrowe, Bishops Hull, Holway, Wilton, Lambrook	Somerset
TA2	TAUNTON	Taunton (north), Norton Fitzwarren, Cheddon Fitzpaine, Kingston St Mary, Monkton Heathfield, West Monkton	Somerset
TA3	TAUNTON	North Curry, Isle Abbots, Stoke St Mary, Stoke St Gregory, Fivehead, Churchinford, Trull	Somerset
TA4	TAUNTON	Bicknoller, Bishops Lydeard, Cotford St. Luke, Crowcombe, Milverton, West Bagborough, Williton, Wiveliscombe	Somerset
TA5	BRIDGWATER	Cannington, Nether Stowey, Over Stowey, Spaxton, Fiddington,	Somerset
TA6	BRIDGWATER	Bridgwater, North Petherton, Wembdon	Somerset
TA7	BRIDGWATER	Puriton, Polden Hills, Westonzoyland, Middlezoy, Shapwick, Catcott, Ashcott, Chedzoy	Somerset
TA8	BURNHAM-ON-SEA	Burnham on Sea, Berrow, Brean, Steep Holm	Somerset
TA9	HIGHBRIDGE	Highbridge, West Huntspill, Brent Knoll	Somerset
TA10	LANGPORT	Langport, Curry Rivel, Huish Episcopi, Hambridge and Westport	Somerset
TA11	SOMERTON	Somerton, Keinton Mandeville, Charlton Mackrell, Charlton Adam	Somerset
TA12	MARTOCK	Martock, Kingsbury Episcopi, Ash, Stembridge, Coat, Stapleton, Witcombe	Somerset
TA13	SOUTH PETHERTON	South Petherton, Over Stratton, Lopen, East Lambrook, West Lambrook	Somerset
TA14	STOKE-SUB-HAMDON	Stoke-sub-Hamdon, Norton-sub-Hamdon, Chiselborough	Somerset
TA15	MONTACUTE	Montacute	Somerset
TA16	MERRIOTT	Merriott	Somerset
TA17	HINTON ST. GEORGE	Hinton St George, Dinnington	Somerset
TA18	CREWKERNE	Crewkerne, Haselbury Plucknett, West Chinnock, Misterton, North Perrott	Somerset, Dorset
TA19	ILMINSTER	Ilminster, Ashill, Ilton, Dowlish Wake, Shepton Beauchamp, Donyatt, Whitelackington	Somerset
TA20	CHARD	Chard, Buckland St Mary, Forton, Combe St Nicholas, Tatworth, Thorncombe	Somerset, Dorset
TA21	WELLINGTON	Wellington, West Buckland, Rockwell Green, Tonedale, Holcombe Rogus	Somerset, Mid Devon
TA22	DULVERTON	Dulverton, Brompton Regis, Exebridge, Exton	Somerset
TA23	WATCHET	Watchet, Washford, Roadwater, Luxborough, Doniford, Treborough	Somerset
TA24	MINEHEAD	Minehead, Porlock, Dunster, Wheddon Cross, Exford, Blue Anchor	Somerset

== Map ==
TA postcode area map, showing postcode districts in red and post towns in grey text, with links to nearby BA, BS, DT and EX postcode areas.

Detailed map of postcode districts and post towns in and around South Petherton

== See also ==
- Postcode Address File
- List of postcode areas in the United Kingdom
