= Grade I listed buildings in Sedgemoor =

Sedgemoor is a former local government district in the English county of Somerset. In the United Kingdom, the term listed building refers to a building or other structure officially designated as being of special architectural, historical or cultural significance; Grade I structures are those considered to be "buildings of exceptional interest". Listing was begun by a provision in the Town and Country Planning Act 1947. Once listed, severe restrictions are imposed on the modifications allowed to a building's structure or its fittings. In England, the authority for listing under the Planning (Listed Buildings and Conservation Areas) Act 1990 rests with Historic England, a non-departmental public body sponsored by the Department for Digital, Culture, Media and Sport; local authorities have a responsibility to regulate and enforce the planning regulations.

Sedgemoor is a low-lying area of land close to sea level between the Quantock and Mendip hills, historically largely marsh (or moor). It contains the bulk of the area also known as the Somerset Levels, including Europe's oldest known engineered roadway, the Sweet Track.

There are 53 Grade I listed buildings in Sedgemoor, 14 of which are in Castle Street, Bridgwater. In 1723–1728, Castle Street was built on the site of the demolished Bridgwater Castle, as homes for the merchants trading in the town's port. Outside the town of Bridgwater, the largest concentration of Grade I listed buildings are in the village of Cannington, where the 12th-century Cannington Court and 14th-century Church of St Mary were both associated with a Benedictine nunnery. Cannington is also the site of the 13th-century Gurney Manor and Blackmoor Farmhouse, which was built around 1480 with its own chapel. Most of the Grade I listed buildings in Sedgemoor are Norman- or medieval-era churches, many of which are included in the Somerset towers, a collection of distinctive, mostly spireless Gothic church towers. Many of the more recent structures in the list are manor houses such as Halswell House, where the south range was built in the 16th century for Sir Nicholas Halswell and the main north range in 1689 for Sir Halswell Tynte. The most recently constructed building in the list is the Corn Exchange in Bridgwater, built in 1834.

== Buildings ==
Name	Location	Type	Completed (Note: The date given is the date used by Historic England as significant for the initial building or that of an important part in the structure's description.)	Grid ref. (Note: The grid reference is based on the British national grid reference system, sometimes known as OSGB36, used by the Ordnance Survey.) Geo-coordinates	Entry number (Note: The "List Entry Number" is a unique number assigned to each listed building and scheduled monument by Historic England.)	Image	Ref.
Blackmoor Farmhouse	Cannington		c. 1480	ST2446738687; 51°08′33″N 3°04′52″W	1175359	Blackmoor Farmhouse More images	
Bridgwater Arts Centre No 11 and 13 Castle Street	Bridgwater	House	1723–1728	ST2994037162; 51°07′46″N 3°00′09″W		Bridgwater Arts Centre No 11 and 13 Castle Street More images	
Cannington Court	Cannington		c. 1138	ST2579039553; 51°09′01″N 3°03′45″W	1344930	Cannington Court More images	
Church of St Andrew	Burnham-on-Sea		14th century	ST3043849408; 51°14′23″N 2°59′52″W	1262914	Church of St Andrew More images	
Church of St Andrew	Cheddar		14th century	ST4596053017; 51°16′25″N 2°46′34″W	1173613	Church of St Andrew More images	
Church of St Andrew	Compton Bishop		13th century	ST3959655392; 51°17′40″N 2°52′04″W	1059079	Church of St Andrew More images	
Church of St Bartholomew	Lyng		14th century	ST3327128874; 51°03′19″N 2°57′12″W	1060114	Church of St Bartholomew More images	
Church of St Christopher	Lympsham	Parish Church	15th century	ST3351954159; 51°16′58″N 2°57′17″W	1262678	Church of St Christopher More images	
Church of St Edward King and Martyr	Goathurst	Parish Church	14th century	ST2565034353; 51°06′13″N 3°03′48″W	1177353	Church of St Edward King and Martyr More images	
Church of St Gregory	Weare	Parish Church	11th century	ST4140452684; 51°16′13″N 2°50′29″W	1295977	Church of St Gregory More images	
Church of St John the Baptist	Axbridge	Parish Church	c. 1400	ST4315154608; 51°17′16″N 2°49′00″W	1173117	Church of St John the Baptist More images	
Church of St John the Baptist	Pawlett	Parish Church	12th century	ST3008642646; 51°10′44″N 3°00′06″W	1173441	Church of St John the Baptist More images	
Church of St Margaret	Spaxton	Parish Church	12th century	ST2252837024; 51°07′38″N 3°06′30″W	1060186	Church of St Margaret More images	
Churchyard cross about 10 meters south of the Church of St Margaret	Spaxton	Parish Church	14th century	ST2253137017; 51°07′38″N 3°06′30″W	1178278	Churchyard cross about 10 meters south of the Church of St Margaret More images	
Parish Church of St Mark (or Holy Cross)	Mark	Parish Church	13th century	ST3807847821; 51°13′34″N 2°53′17″W	1252187	Parish Church of St Mark (or Holy Cross) More images	
Church of St Mary	Berrow	Parish Church	13th century	ST2938652462; 51°16′01″N 3°00′49″W	1262961	Church of St Mary More images	
Church of St Mary	Bridgwater		13th century	ST2977236987; 51°07′40″N 3°00′18″W	1197414	Church of St Mary More images	
Church of St Mary	Cannington		Late 14th century	ST2579339524; 51°09′01″N 3°03′44″W	1059059	Church of St Mary More images	
Church of St Mary	Chedzoy	Parish Church	13th century	ST3411537668; 51°08′04″N 2°56′35″W	1060110	Church of St Mary More images	
Church of St Mary the Blessed Virgin	East Brent		15th century	ST3438851913; 51°15′45″N 2°56′30″W	1262673	Church of St Mary the Blessed Virgin More images	
Church of St Mary	Moorlinch	Parish Church	13th century	ST3980036879; 51°07′41″N 2°51′42″W	1060121	Church of St Mary More images	
Church of St Mary	North Petherton	Parish Church	12th century	ST2902833021; 51°05′32″N 3°00′53″W	1058924	Church of St Mary More images	
Church of St Mary	Charlynch, Spaxton	Parish Church	11th century	ST2384437805; 51°08′04″N 3°05′23″W	1178212	Church of St Mary More images	
Church of St Mary	Wedmore	Parish Church	12th century	ST4346847926; 51°13′40″N 2°48′40″W	1262159	Church of St Mary More images	
Church of St Mary	Woolavington	Parish Church	11th century	ST3479141648; 51°10′13″N 2°56′03″W	1060144	Church of St Mary More images	
Church of St Mary & All Saints	Broomfield	Parish Church	15th century	ST2242732019; 51°04′56″N 3°06′32″W	1058934	Church of St Mary & All Saints More images	
Church of St Mary the Virgin	Westonzoyland	Parish Church	13th century	ST3517334790; 51°06′31″N 2°55′39″W	1174351	Church of St Mary the Virgin More images	
Church of St Michael	Brent Knoll	Parish Church	11th century	ST3354150745; 51°15′07″N 2°57′13″W	1251356	Church of St Michael More images	
Church of St Michael	Othery	Parish Church	13th century	ST3824831613; 51°04′50″N 2°52′59″W	1060090	Church of St Michael More images	
Church of St Michael & All Angels	Greinton		12th century	ST4125936414; 51°07′26″N 2°50′27″W	1296062	Church of St Michael & All Angels More images	
Church of St Michael and All Angels	Puriton	Parish Church	Early 13th century	ST3203341720; 51°10′14″N 2°58′25″W	1344664	Church of St Michael and All Angels More images	
Church of St Peter	Catcott		15th century	ST3941739281; 51°08′58″N 2°52′03″W	1173050	Church of St Peter More images	
Church of St Peter	West Huntspill	Parish Church	c. 1400	ST3047445469; 51°12′15″N 2°59′48″W	1060138	Church of St Peter More images	
Church of the Holy Cross	Middlezoy	Parish Church	13th century	ST3747133099; 51°05′38″N 2°53′39″W	1344695	Church of the Holy Cross More images	
Corn Exchange	Bridgwater		1834	ST2981637032; 51°07′42″N 3°00′16″W	1205740	Corn Exchange More images	
Gothelney Hall	Spaxton	Manor House	15th century	ST2554837609; 51°07′58″N 3°03′56″W	1060185	Gothelney Hall More images	
Halswell House	Goathurst		16th century	ST2539733795; 51°05′55″N 3°04′00″W	1058950	Halswell House More images	
Lions House	Bridgwater		1730	ST2998037288; 51°07′50″N 3°00′07″W	1279714	Lions House More images	
No 1 Castle Street	Bridgwater	House	1723–1728	ST2999237180; 51°07′47″N 3°00′07″W	1297184	No 1 Castle Street More images	
No 2 Castle Street	Bridgwater	House	1723–1728	ST2998637195; 51°07′47″N 3°00′07″W	1280699	No 2 Castle Street More images	
No 3 Castle Street	Bridgwater	House	1723–1728	ST2998837174; 51°07′46″N 3°00′07″W	1197356	No 3 Castle Street More images	
No 4 Castle Street	Bridgwater	House	1723–1728	ST2998137198; 51°07′47″N 3°00′07″W	1297185	No 4 Castle Street More images	
No 5 Castle Street	Bridgwater	House	1723–1728	ST2997837171; 51°07′46″N 3°00′07″W	1197357	No 5 Castle Street More images	
No 6 Castle Street and attached wall to rear	Bridgwater	House	1723–1728	ST2996337196; 51°07′47″N 3°00′08″W	1197358	No 6 Castle Street and attached wall to rear More images	
No 7 Castle Street	Bridgwater	House	1723–1728	ST2996337164; 51°07′46″N 3°00′08″W	1197359	No 7 Castle Street More images	
No 8 Castle Street	Bridgwater	House	1723–1728	ST2995137195; 51°07′47″N 3°00′09″W	1197360	No 8 Castle Street More images	
No 9 Castle Street and attached walls and outhouse	Bridgwater	House	1723–1728	ST2995437152; 51°07′46″N 3°00′09″W	1197361	No 9 Castle Street and attached walls and outhouse More images	
No 10 Castle Street	Bridgwater	House	1723–1728	ST2993737193; 51°07′47″N 3°00′09″W	1197362	No 10 Castle Street More images	
No 12 Castle Street	Bridgwater	House	1723–1728	ST2992437192; 51°07′47″N 3°00′10″W	1197364	No 12 Castle Street More images	
No 14 Castle Street	Bridgwater	House	1723–1728	ST2991437190; 51°07′47″N 3°00′11″W	1197365	No 14 Castle Street More images	
No 16 Castle Street and attached wall	Bridgwater	House	1723–1728	ST2990537194; 51°07′47″N 3°00′11″W	1297186	No 16 Castle Street and attached wall More images	
Remains of the keep of Stowey Castle	Nether Stowey		11th century	ST1868739574; 51°08′59″N 3°09′50″W	1059074	Remains of the keep of Stowey Castle More images	
Gurney Manor	Cannington		13th century	ST2630539427; 51°08′58″N 3°03′18″W	1344898	Gurney Manor More images	

== See also ==
- List of Grade I listed buildings in Somerset
- Category:Grade I listed buildings in Somerset
- Grade II* listed buildings in Sedgemoor
