= St Mary's Church, Moorlinch =

Church in Somerset, England

Church of St Mary
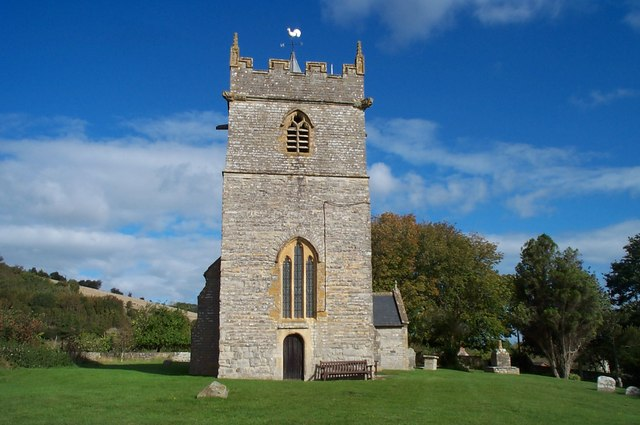

- Location within Somerset

General information
- Location: Moorlinch, England
- Coordinates: 51.1280°N 2.8616°W
- Completed: 13th century

The Church of St Mary in Moorlinch, Somerset, England dates from the 13th century and has been designated as a Grade I listed building. The church sits on the southern flank of the Polden Hills.

The earliest mention of a church at Moorlinch is a charter of King Ine in 725 and then in one of King Edgar in 971, although the authenticity of these documents has been challenged. In 1262 it was acquired by Glastonbury Abbey in 1262. The church includes a 14th-century chancel, and a 12th-century nave with a south porch. The font dates from the 12th century, while the pulpit is Jacobean, but made from wood taken from earlier perpendicular panels. The organ dates from 1800 and was made by James Davis.

The west tower contains six bells the oldest being the tenor which was cast in 1651 by Thomas Purdue of Closworth.

The parish is part of the benefice of Middlezoy and Othery and Moorlinch with Stawell and Sutton Mallet, within the Glastonbury deanery.

== See also ==
- Grade I listed buildings in Sedgemoor
- List of Somerset towers
- List of ecclesiastical parishes in the Diocese of Bath and Wells
