= St Michael's Church, Othery =

Church in Othery, Somerset, England

Church of St Michael
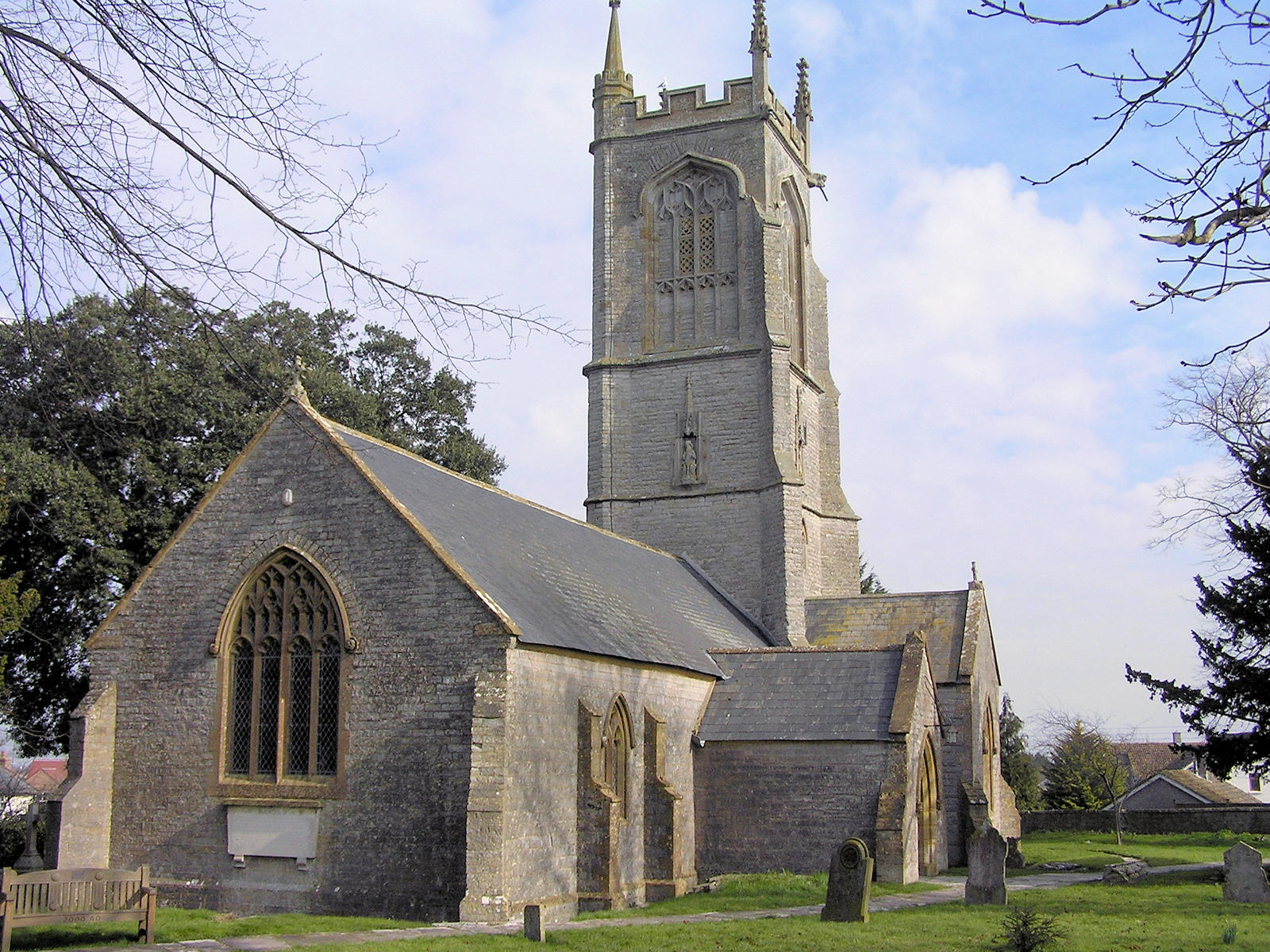

- Location within Somerset

General information
- Architectural style: Norman
- Location: Othery, England
- Coordinates: 51.0806°N 2.8829°W

The Church of St Michael in Othery, Somerset, England dates back to the 12th century. It has been designated by English Heritage as a Grade I listed building. It is on the Heritage at Risk Register due to the state of the high level stonework on the tower.

Othery was a chapelry of Sowy parish with its own chaplain from 1203, but the church of St Michael was dedicated before that time. In 1515, when Sowy was divided, Othery became a separate parish with its own parish church and vicar. The church, perpendicular in style, was remodelled in the 15th century, and partly rebuilt after 1844. Its typical Somerset tower was restored in 1849 and in 1853, when pinnacles and niches were built; sculptures of heads and angels were added in the following years. There are five bells in the tower; the oldest dates to the 1650s and was made by Robert Austen. The other bells date from between 1692 and 1815.

Roundels of medieval glass, originally from Glastonbury Abbey and depicting the heads of three doctors of the church, have been preserved. Stained glass by Hardman, Bell, and Holland of Warwick was installed in the 1850s in the chancel, vestry, and north transept. The church houses a memorial to the three Chard brothers, who included Colonel John Chard, V.C. (d. 1897), who led the defence of Rorke's Drift, South Africa, and whose father lived at Pathe.

The church registers go back to 1560, but the oldest register appears to be a rather poor late 17th-century copy of the original, "crudely arranged in alphabetical order of Christian names and with a gap from K–Q."

The Othery Cope, found under the mediaeval pulpit at the time of the Victorian renovations, is an extremely rare 16th-century ecclesiastical robe, restored and now housed at the Glastonbury Abbey Museum.

Othery church is one of the churches dedicated to St Michael that falls on a ley line proposed by John Michell. Other connected St Michaels on the ley line include churches built at Burrow Mump and Glastonbury Tor.

The first Vicar of Othery Parish was John Colmer (1515–1522).

== See also ==
- List of ecclesiastical parishes in the Diocese of Bath and Wells
