= St Mary's Church, East Brent =

Church of St Mary
- Church of St Mary the Blessed Virgin
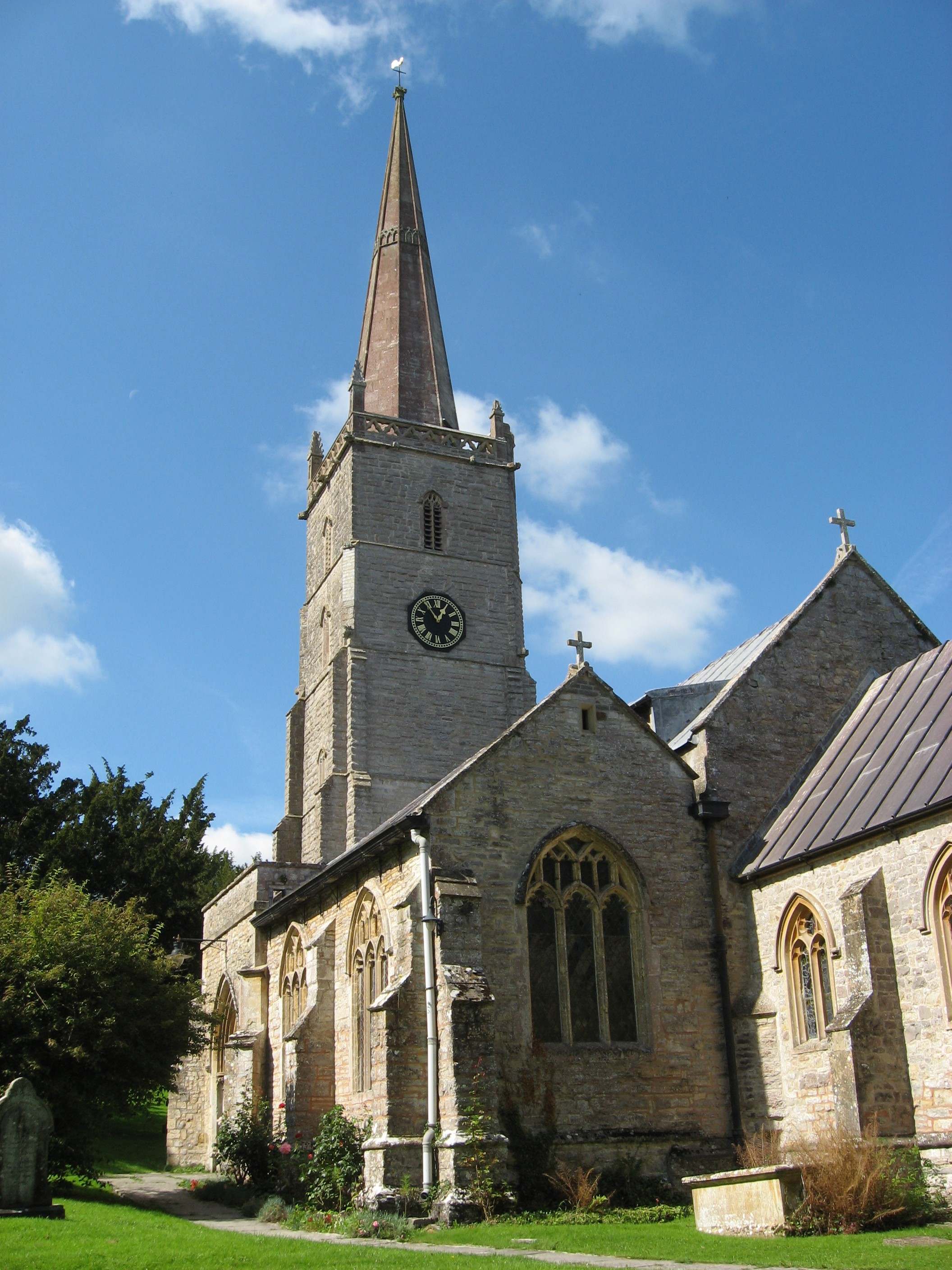

- Location within Somerset
- 51.2626°N 2.9417°W
- Location: Church Road, East Brent, Somerset, TA9 4HZ
- Country: England
- Denomination: Church of England
- Previous denomination: Roman Catholic
- Churchmanship: Central
- Website: theparishofthreesaints.org.uk

History
- Status: Active
- Dedication: St Mary the Virgin

Architecture
- Functional status: Parish church
- Heritage designation: Grade I listed
- Designated: 9 February 1961
- Style: Perpendicular Gothic
- Years built: 15th century

Specifications
- Materials: stone

Administration
- Province: Canterbury
- Diocese: Bath and Wells
- Archdeaconry: Archdeaconry of Wells
- Parish: Parish of Three Saints

The Church of St Mary the Blessed Virgin is a Church of England parish church in East Brent, Somerset, England. It was built in the 15th century is a Grade I listed building.

== History ==
Parts of the building date from 1298. The west tower and spire were added around 1400.

The church has a 15th-century eagle lectern and pulpit from 1634.

In the 19th century the building was restored with a chancel by William Butterfield. The heating system includes spiral heating pipe coils.

On 9 February 1961 the church was designated a Grade I listed building.

In the late 1990s the stonework of the tower was repaired using local lias stone to fit in with the original architecture. The dangerous state of the spire required £200,000 to be raised for repairs.

== Bells ==
The west tower has a ring of six bells. The third bell was cast in about 1450, possibly by the Bristol foundry. William Chamberlain of Aldgate, London cast the fourth bell in about 1480. George Davis of Bridgwater cast the fifth bell in 1799. Llewellins & James of Bristol cast the tenor bell in 1877 and the treble and second bells in 1910.

== Administration ==
The patron of the Church of England parish is the Bishop of Wells. It is part of the Parish of Three Saints along with the Church of St Christopher, Lympsham and the Church of St Michael, Brent Knoll.

== Notable clergy ==
Charles Fane de Salis was the vicar in the late 19th century, before being made Suffragan Bishop of Taunton. From 1911 to 1935 the vicar was Archie Wickham who played cricket for Somerset County Cricket Club.

== See also ==
- List of Grade I listed buildings in Sedgemoor
- List of towers in Somerset
- List of ecclesiastical parishes in the Diocese of Bath and Wells
