= Blackmoor Farmhouse, Cannington =

Building in Cannington, Somerset, England

Blackmoor Farmhouse
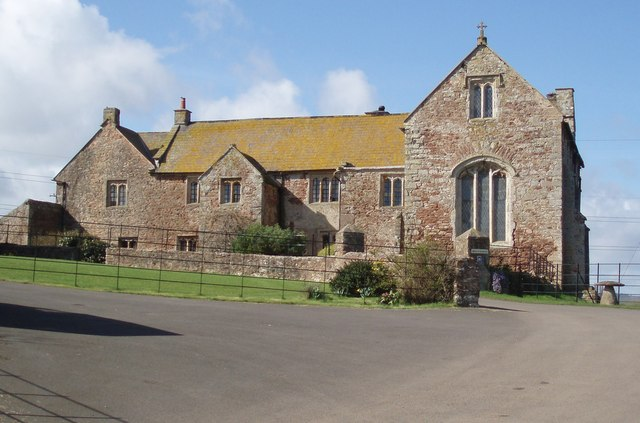
- Blackmoor Farmhouse in 2006

- Location within Somerset

General information
- Location: Cannington, Somerset, England
- Coordinates: 51.1416°N 3.0786°W
- Completed: c. 1480

Listed Building – Grade I
- Official name: Blackmoor Farmhouse
- Designated: 29 March 1963
- Reference no.: 1175359

Blackmoor Farmhouse at Cannington, Somerset, England and the attached chapel, was built around 1480 for Sir Thomas Tremayll. It was designated as a Grade I listed building on 29 March 1963. The farm now offers bed and breakfast accommodation and is a wedding venue.

== Building ==
The farmhouse was originally built for Sir Thomas Tremayll as a manor house, with integrated chapel, in approximately 1480. During the 16th century a porch was added, as well as a service wing. The interior was altered in the 19th century, adding windows to the rear of the property at the same time. The two story farmhouse is made of red sandstone rubble, with roughly cut quoins and rubble chimneystacks. The roof is slate ending in coped verges.

The front of the building has a number of bays ending in the chapel wing to the north, which includes tall lancet arch windows as well as an ogee-headed moulded stone door frame. The main entrance to the house is in one of the bays, with a studded door, in a similar ogee-headed moulded stone door frame. On the south side of the house there is a garderobe, also two storeys high, with a turret to the rear.

The building has many architectural features of its period with the roof structure comprising a series of jointed crucks together with some curved wind-braces still in place. There are coffered ceilings and a plank and muntin screen with soot blackening to one side now in one of the upstairs rooms (possibly re-sited from being a screens passage at the entrance to the main hall where one would expect to see this type of structure).

== Owners and residents ==
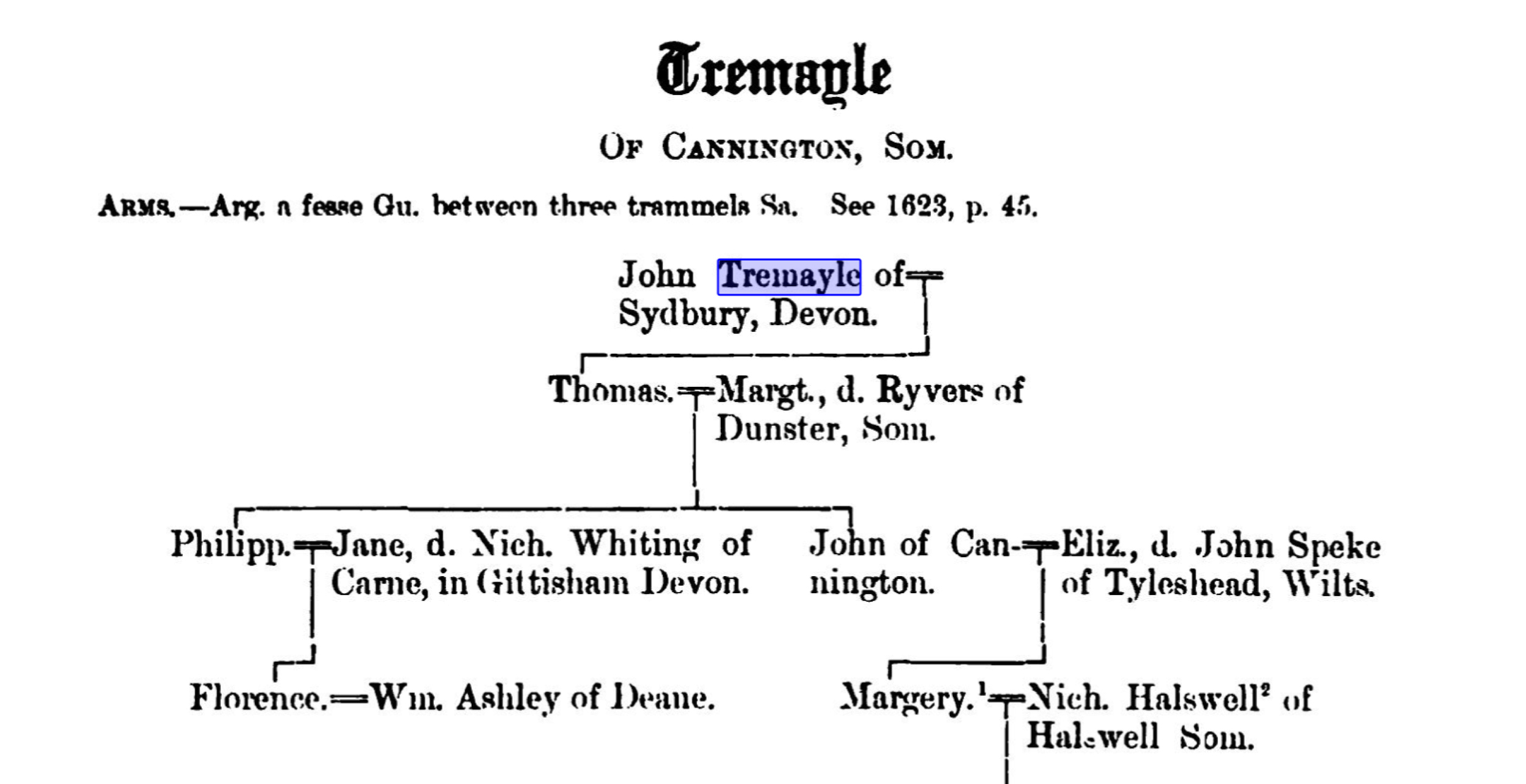
Family Tree of Tremayle family in 1531.

Sir Thomas Tremayle (1446–1508) built Blackmore Farm in about 1480. He had purchased the manor in 1476. He was also a Member of Parliament. His father was John Tremayle of Sidbury. He married Margaret Ryvers of Dunster and the couple had two sons and four daughters. When Thomas died in 1508 he left the property to his second son John Tremayle.

John Tremayle (d. 1534) married Elizabeth Speke daughter of John Speke. Their daughter Margery inherited the property. She married Nicholas Halswell (1510–1564) and Blackmore Farm was brought into the Halswell estate which is nearby. After their deaths their eldest son Robert Halswell became the owner of the house. From this date Blackmore Farm descended in the same manner as the Halswell Estate.

Robert Halswell (d. 1570) married Susan Brouncker of Melksham and their eldest son Sir Nicholas Halswell (1566–1633) became the owner when Robert died in 1570. He married Bridget Wallop, daughter of Sir Henry Wallop. There is a monument and effigies of both of them in St Edwards Church in Goathurst which can be seen at this reference. His son Henry Halswell (d. 1636) became the heir and as he was unmarried his younger brother Revd. Hugh Halswell (d. 1672) inherited the estate when Henry died in 1636. Hugh had no male heirs but his daughter Jane married John Tynte of Chelvey (1617–79). Their son Sir Halswell Tynte (1649–1702) became the heir when Hugh died in 1672. Blackmore Farm had now been brought to the Tynte family.

The property descended in the Tynte family for the next two centuries. The Tithe records of 1839 show that the owner of Blackmore Farm was Charles John Kemeys-Tynte (1778–1860). It continued to be part of the Halswell estate owned by the Kemeys-Tynte family. In 1952 it was occupied by the Dyer family who still own it today.

== See also ==
- List of Grade I listed buildings in Sedgemoor
