= St Mary's Church, Charlynch =

Church in Somerset, England

Church of St Mary
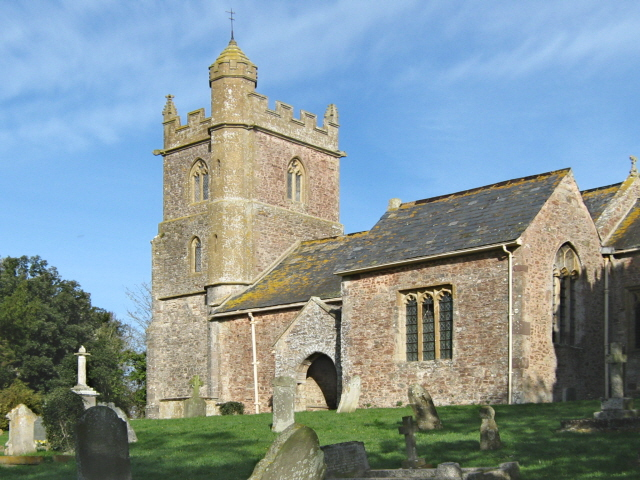

- Location within Somerset

General information
- Location: Spaxton, England
- Coordinates: 51.1343°N 3.0885°W
- Completed: 11th century

The Church of St Mary at Charlynch in the parish of Spaxton, Somerset, England was an Anglican Parish Church, but has now been deconsecrated. It dates from the 11th century with a tower probably of 1867. It has been designated as a Grade I listed building.

== History ==
The lordship of the parish and the right to appoint the rector was held by the manor of Currypool from 1245 until 1681. It was later under the patronage of the Martyrs Memorial Trust until the church closed in 1981.

The church building included a nave with a south porch and a transeptal south chapel. The chancel had the vestry and organ chamber attached. The three-stage west tower was added in the 19th century. There is some 15th-century stained glass in the transept. The Norman church included a doorway and chancel arch considered Romanesque. The font is from a similar period.

The church contains monuments and tablets to the family of Admiral Robert Blake. A reredos was erected in 1893 in memory of Lady Mary Taunton. After deconsecration in 1981 the altar was moved to the Church of St Margaret, Spaxton.

Since 1986 the church has been converted into a private residence. The former Rectory was sold in 1951 and divided into two private homes, known as Charlinch House and Tudor House.

== Henry James Prince ==
In 1840 the Reverend Henry James Prince was appointed curate at Charlynch. His energetic and animated preaching and his unconventional theology led to what he later described as the Charlinch Revival. In 1842, Bishop Law of Bath and Wells revoked Prince's licence to preach. He was subsequently defrocked and later founded the Agapemone at Spaxton and declared himself to be an incarnation of Christ.

== See also ==
- List of Grade I listed buildings in Sedgemoor
- List of towers in Somerset
