= Lions House, Bridgwater =

House in Bridgwater, Somerset, England

Lions House
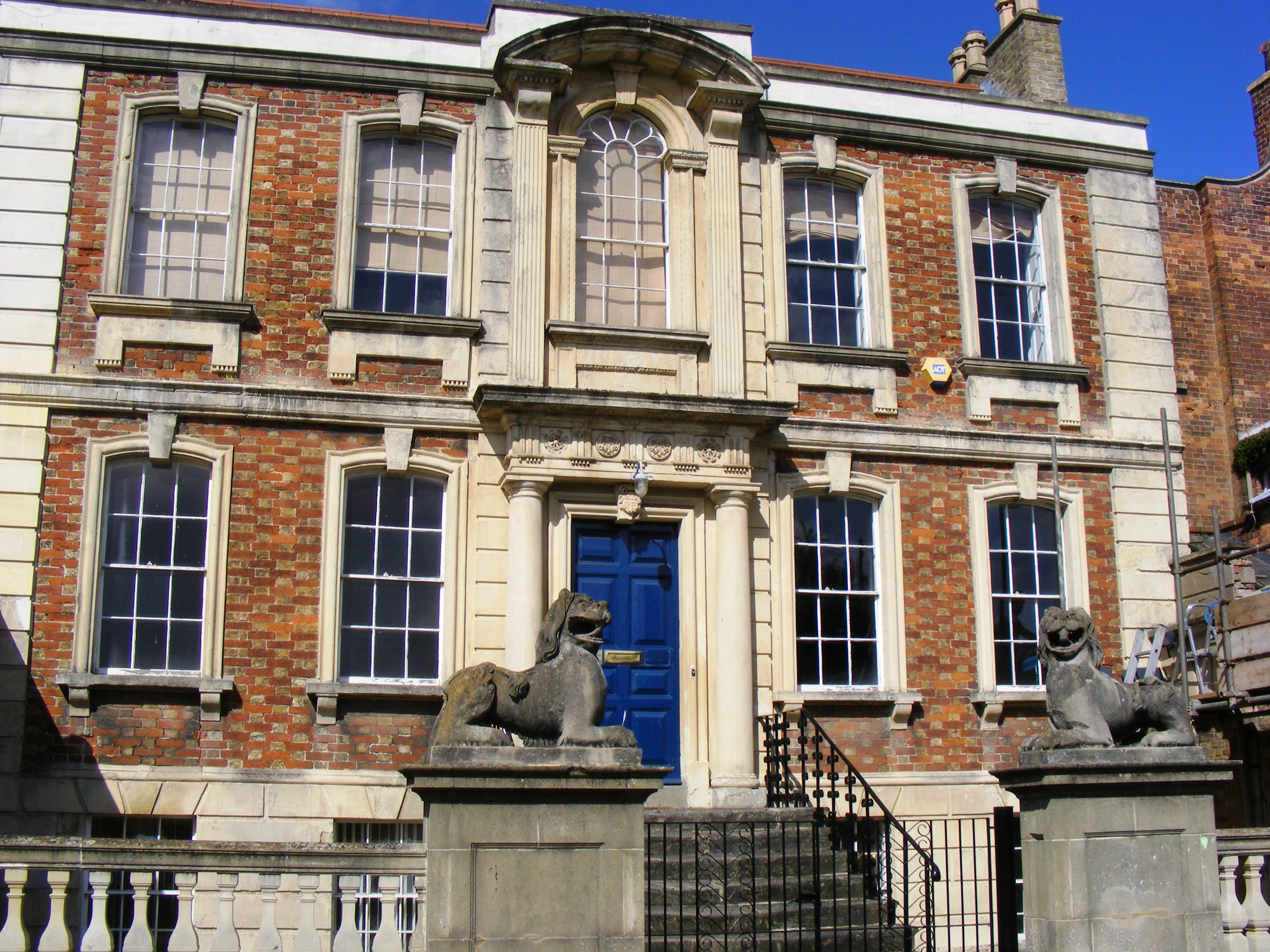

- Location within Somerset

General information
- Architectural style: Baroque
- Location: Bridgwater, England
- Coordinates: 51.1297°N 3.0012°W
- Completed: c. 1727

Design and construction
- Architect: Benjamin Holloway

The Lions House on West Quay in Bridgwater, Somerset, England was built around 1725 and has been designated as a Grade I listed building.

It was built between 1720 and 1730 in a Baroque style by Benjamin Holloway, as his house and was later occupied by several Mayors of Bridgwater. Holloway was employed by the Duke of Chandos to build and possibly design the houses in nearby Castle Street.

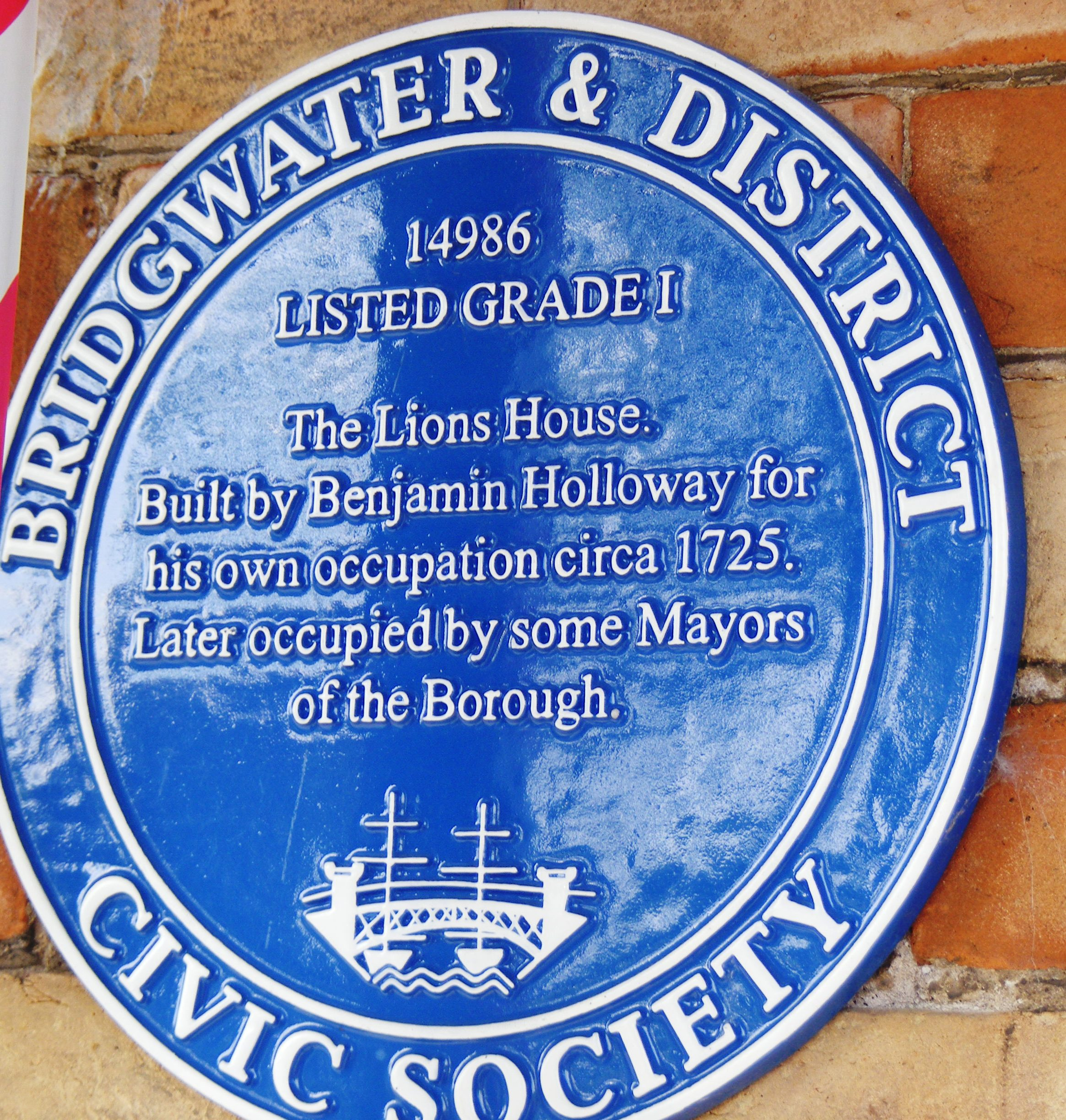
Blue Plaque

The two-storey house is of five bays with single storey wings on either side of front door which is approached via a flight of steps. It is built of Flemish-bond brick of alternate red and yellow, beneath a double-pitched pantile roof. At the front of the house are 20th-century low panelled and corniced gatepiers which carry Chinese-style dogs (The Lions).

The building is now known as Benjamin Holloway House. Parts of the building have been converted for commercial use and include a dentists and a professional services firm.

The Lion statues have been used as the inspiration for an exhibit by artist Rebecca Moss as part of Somerset Art Week. They are made in concrete to link to the local industrial heritage and the nearby Castle House, which was one of the first buildings to make extensive use of Portland cement for pre-cast concrete.

== See also ==
- List of Grade I listed buildings in Sedgemoor
