= Church of the Holy Cross, Middlezoy =

Church in Somerset, England

Church of the Holy Cross
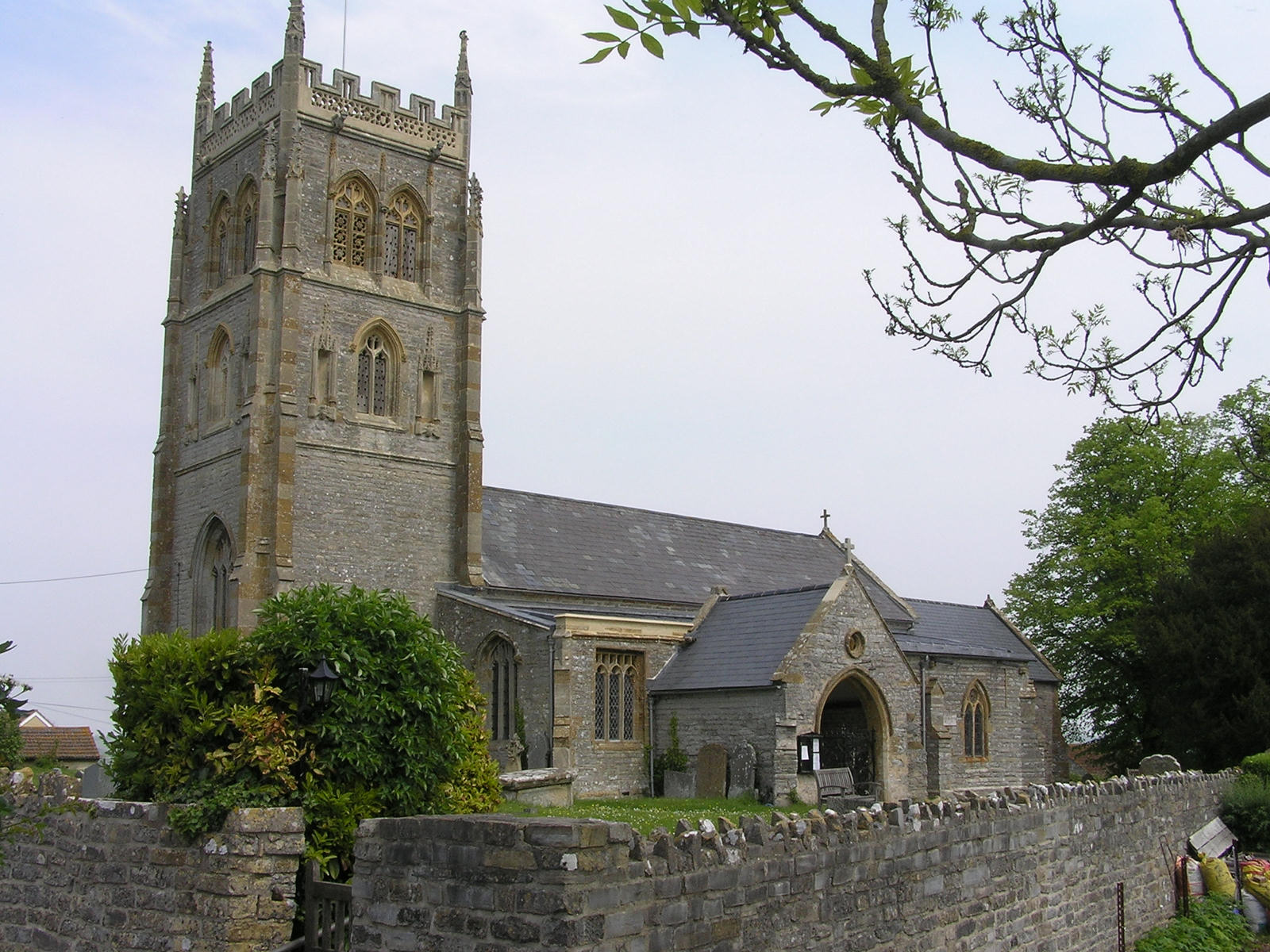

- Location within Somerset

General information
- Location: Middlezoy, England
- Coordinates: 51.0938°N 2.8943°W
- Completed: 13th century

The Church of the Holy Cross in Middlezoy, Somerset, England dates from the 13th century and has been designated as a grade I listed building.

William of Bitton II was the rector by 20 April 1263. From the 13th to early 16th century, when it became a separate parish, Middlezoy was a chapelry of Sowy parish. The church was originally dedicated to St. Lawrence and later to St. Mary before adopting the current dedication in 1754.

The church has a chancel and a nave with a south aisle and south porch, and a north chapel or vestry. The 3-stage west tower was built around 1483, similar to that at Lyng. The tower contains six bells, including one of 1608, probably by George Purdue of Closworth. The upper part of the tower was restored by Sall Strachey Historic Conservation. The work included replacing the pinnacles and sections of the pierced parapet. On the stonework are hunky punks which have been severely damaged by the weather.

The whole church has been renovated many times with a major restoration being undertaken in the 1860s to plans by Charles Knowles, with further repairs in 1908.

The parish is part of the benefice of Middlezoy and Othery and Moorlinch with Stawell and Sutton Mallet, within the Glastonbury deanery.

== See also ==
- List of Grade I listed buildings in Sedgemoor
- List of towers in Somerset
- List of ecclesiastical parishes in the Diocese of Bath and Wells
