= St Christopher's Church, Lympsham =

Church in Lympsham, Somerset, England

Church of St Christopher
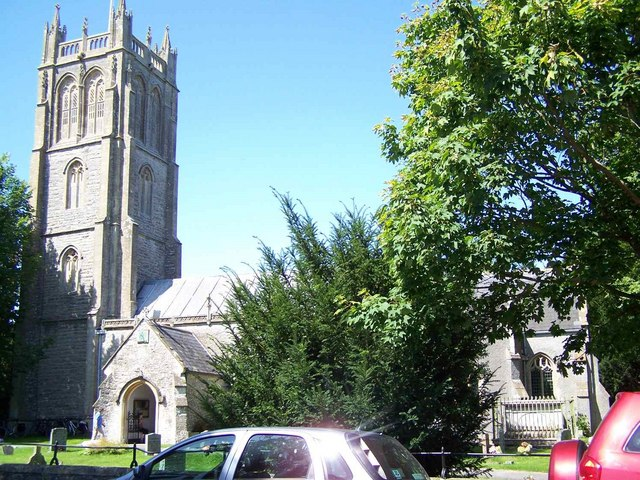

- Location within Somerset

General information
- Location: Lympsham, England
- Coordinates: 51.2828°N 2.9548°W
- Completed: 15th century

The Church of St Christopher in Lympsham, Somerset, England dates from the 15th century, and has been designated as a Grade I listed building.

It is known that Bartholomew de England was appointed rector at Lympsham in 1274, although the parish had been given by Ine of Wessex to Glastonbury Abbey in 690 remaining part of the Abbey estates until the dissolution of the monasteries in 1539.

During the 19th century extensive restoration was carried out by Rev A. J. Stephenson and his son, J. H. Stephenson. Further refurbishment was undertaken in 1909.

Archaeological exploration in 2001 uncovered a copper alloy coin from Bath dated 1670.

The parish is part of the benefice of Brent Knoll, East Brent and Lympsham, within the deanery of Axbridge.

== See also ==
- List of Grade I listed buildings in Sedgemoor
- List of towers in Somerset
- List of ecclesiastical parishes in the Diocese of Bath and Wells
