= Church of St John the Baptist, Pawlett =

Church in Somerset, England

Church of St John the Baptist
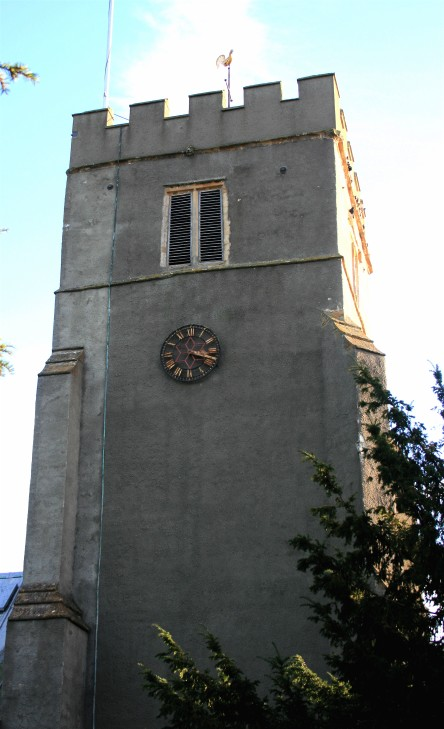
- Bell tower of St John the Baptist church

- Location within Somerset

General information
- Location: Pawlett, England
- Coordinates: 51.1788°N 3.0014°W
- Completed: 12th century

The Church of St John the Baptist in Pawlett, Somerset, England dates from the 12th century and has been designated as a Grade I listed building.

The Norman church of St John the Baptist replaced an earlier Saxon structure and the church is thought to have been a popular station on medieval pilgrimages from Watchet to Glastonbury. The south doorway arch features three bands of decoration: lozenges, zigzags, and a biting beasts motif on the outer ring. The baptismal font appears to be made from two separate fonts, the bottom part an inverted Saxon font topped with an upright plain Norman font.

The rood screen is 15th-century. The 20th-century north window shows Christ blessing children who are in modern dress and holding a teddy bear and toy boat. Other unusual features include pew boxes that still retain hat pegs, reflecting a time when congregants wore hats to church. The chancel includes wide communion rails on three sides, thought to have been used for seated communion. Unusual and ancient features of the church in part owe their preservation to major renovations made in 1779. That "modernization" seems to have slaked the zeal for Victorian-era updates which eliminated such features in many other churches in the area. The crumbling of the church's blue lias stone led to its exterior being coated with cement.

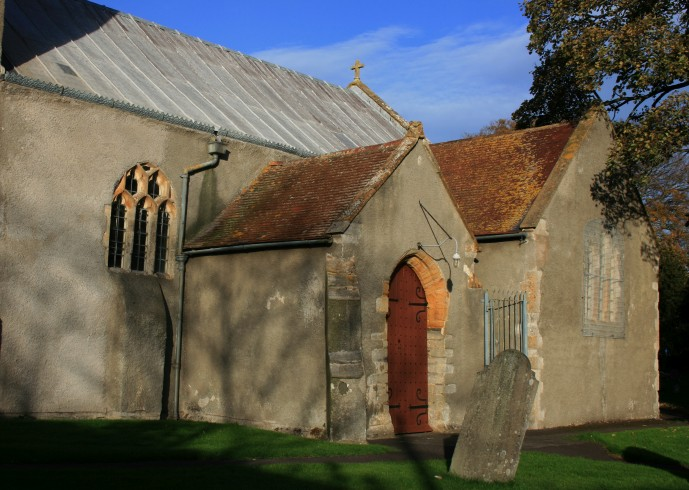
South side of St John the Baptist church

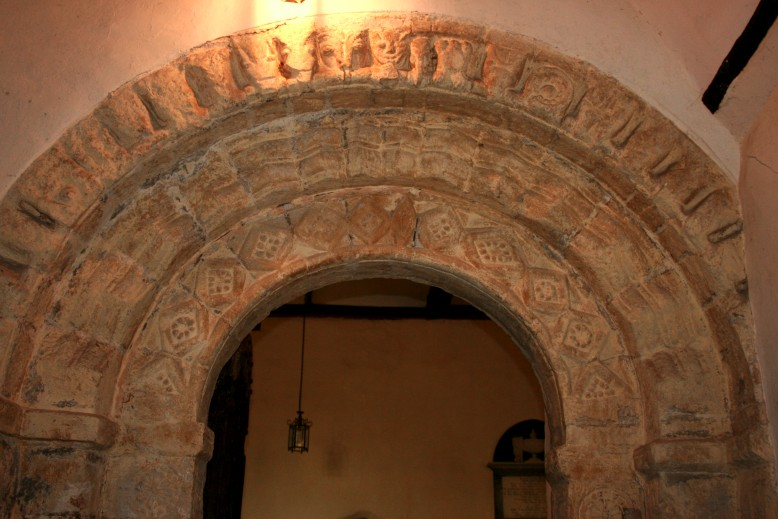
Norman arch over south door, St John the Baptist church

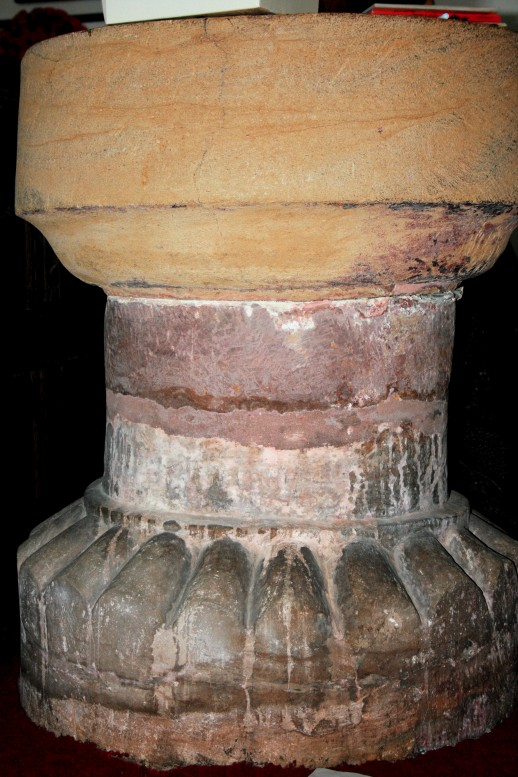
Inverted Saxon baptismal font supporting upright Norman font

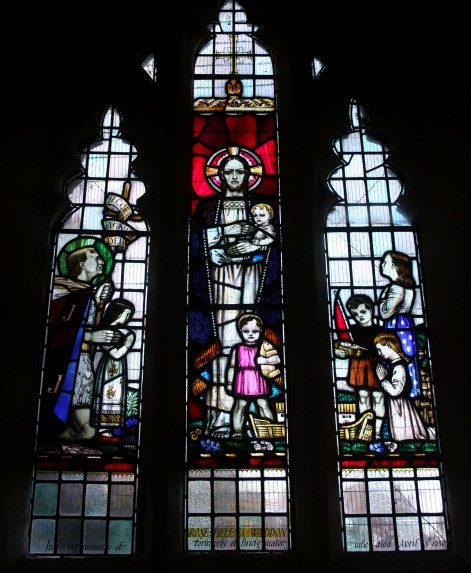
North window stained glass with modern-era children memorializes Rose Helena Wadden, said to have taught the first children's Sunday School class in Bridgwater

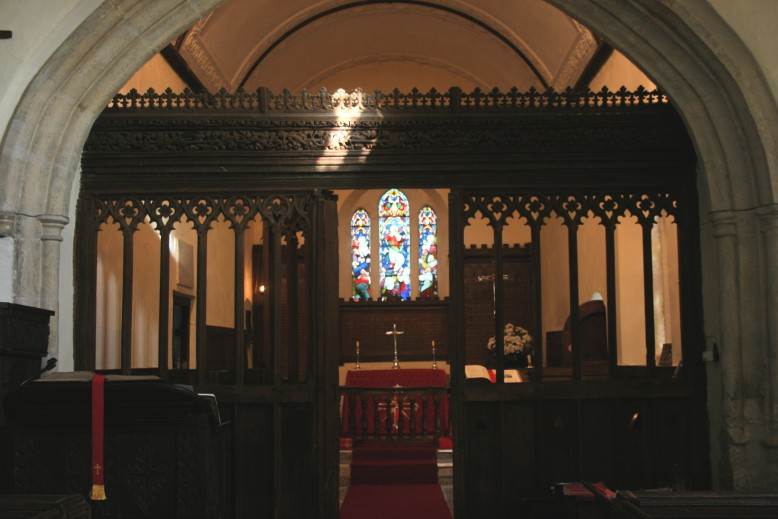
Rood screen and altar

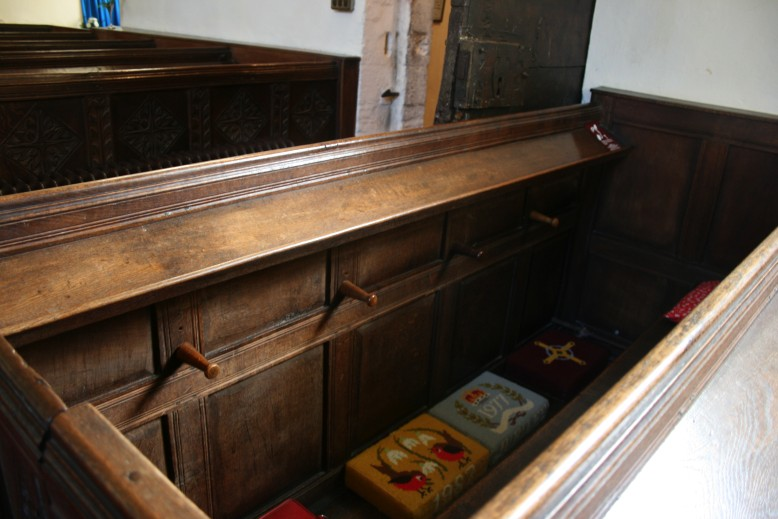
Pew boxes still include pegs for hanging up hats

== See also ==
- List of Grade I listed buildings in Sedgemoor
- List of towers in Somerset
- List of ecclesiastical parishes in the Diocese of Bath and Wells
