= St Andrew's Church, Cheddar =

Church in Somerset, England

Church of St Andrew
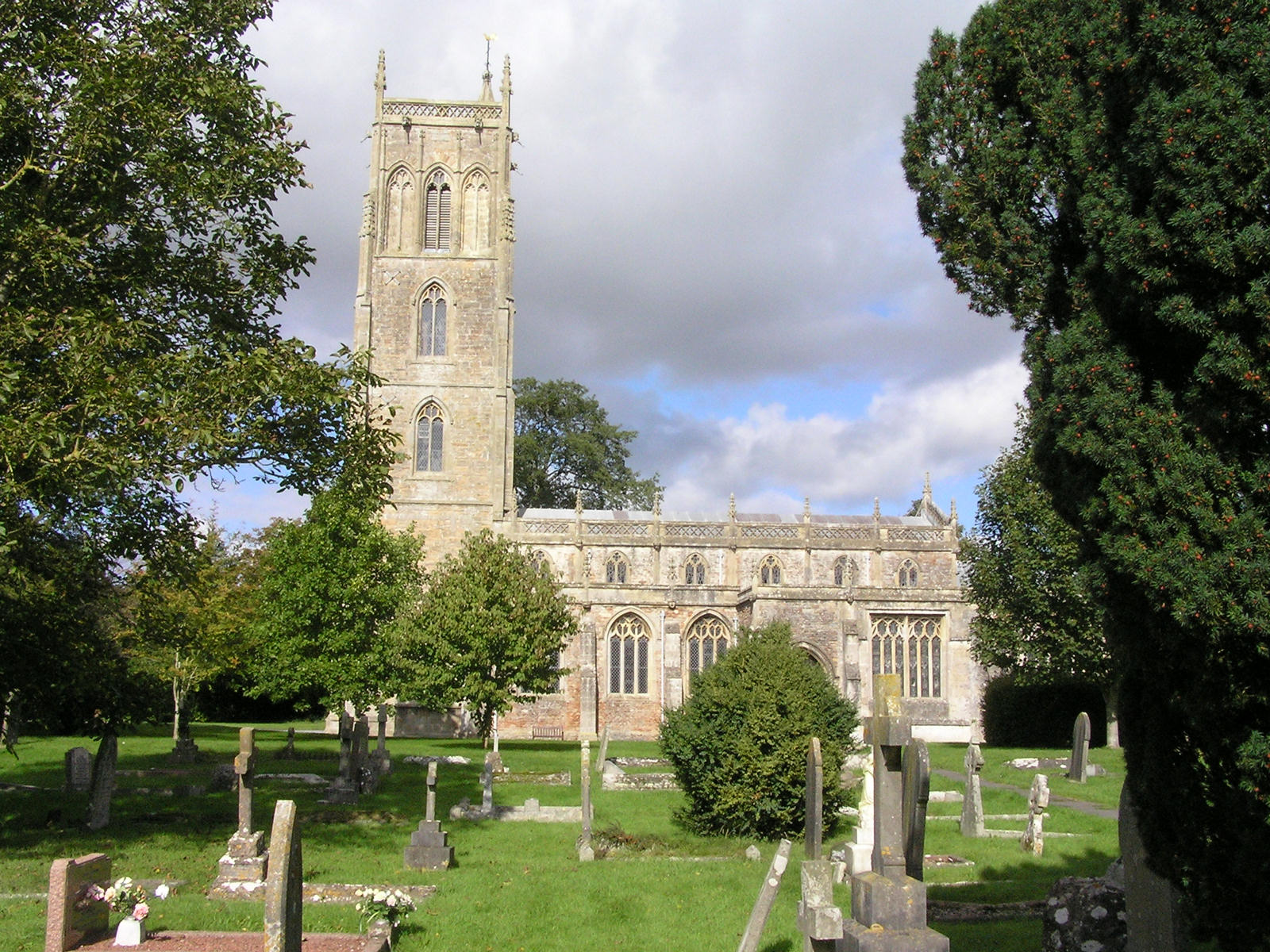

- Location within Somerset

General information
- Location: Cheddar, England
- Coordinates: 51.2737°N 2.7761°W
- Completed: 14th century

The Church of St Andrew in Cheddar, Somerset, England dates from the 14th century and has been designated as a Grade I listed building.

The church was restored in 1873 by William Butterfield. It contains some 15th-century stained glass and an altar table of 1631. The chest tomb in the chancel is believed to be to Sir Thomas Cheddar and is dated 1442.

The tower, which rises to 100 feet (30 m), and dates from around 1423, contains eight change-ringing bells, the tenor of which dates from 1759 and was cast by Thomas Bilbie of the Bilbie family. The oldest bell dates from circa 1580.

St Andrew's is the Church of England parish church for Cheddar. The Rector is The Reverend Stuart Burns, who was licensed as priest-in-charge in February 2016.

== See also ==
- List of Grade I listed buildings in Sedgemoor
- List of towers in Somerset
- List of ecclesiastical parishes in the Diocese of Bath and Wells
