= Hundred of Brent-cum-Wrington =

Historical Hundred of Somerset, England

Brent-cum-Wrington
- Area
- 18,200 acres (7,400 ha)
- Status: Hundred
- Subdivisions
  - Type: Parishes
  - Units: Berrow, Burrington, Broadfield, East Brent and Wrington

The Hundred of Brent-cum-Wrington is one of the 40 historical Hundreds in the ceremonial county of Somerset, England, dating from before the Norman conquest during the Anglo-Saxon era although exact dates are unknown. Each hundred had a 'fyrd', which acted as the local defence force and a court which was responsible for the maintenance of the frankpledge system. They also formed a unit for the collection of taxes. The role of the hundred court was described in the Dooms (laws) of King Edgar. The name of the hundred was normally that of its meeting-place.

The hundred of Brent-cum-Wrington was a relatively small hundred that contained the parishes of Berrow, Burrington, Broadfield, East Brent and Wrington. It covered an area of 18,200 acres (7,400 ha) but little is known about the population of the hundred.

The importance of the hundred courts declined from the seventeenth century. By the 19th century several different single-purpose subdivisions of counties, such as poor law unions, sanitary districts, and highway districts sprang up, filling the administrative role previously played by parishes and hundreds. Although the Hundreds have never been formally abolished, their functions ended with the establishment of county courts in 1867 and the introduction of districts by the Local Government Act 1894.
