= St Mary's Church, Chedzoy =

Church in Somerset, England

Church of St Mary
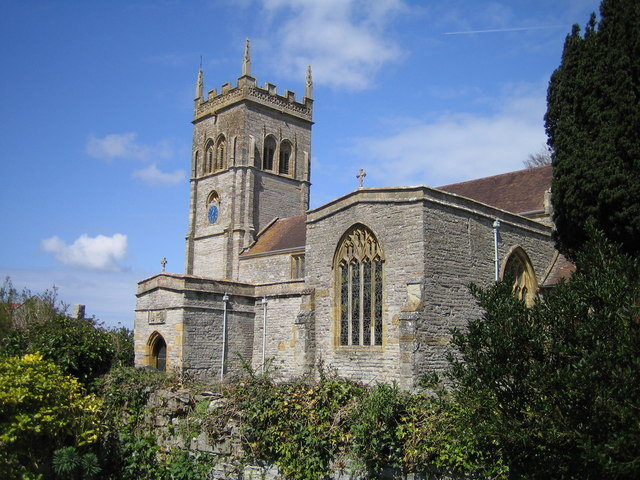

- Location within Somerset

General information
- Location: Chedzoy, England
- Coordinates: 51.1345°N 2.9429°W
- Completed: 13th century

The Anglican Church of St Mary in Chedzoy, Somerset, England dates from the 13th century and has been designated as a grade I listed building.

There is evidence of a Church in Chedzoy in 1166 when it was given along with the parent church in North Petherton to Buckland Priory. The tower dates from the early 16th century when the porch, clerestory, the arch into the north transept, and the windows in the north aisle were added.

Much of the current building is from the 17th century, although the Norman chancel, chancel arch and doorway remain. It was extensively remodelled by William Butterfield in 1861. A late medieval screen and rood loft were removed around 1841. The font has survived since the 13th century. The pulpit is from the 16th century. Amongst the memorials is a monumental brass believed to commemorate Richard Sydenham who died in 1499.

Local tradition says that the church still bears marks form the forces of the Duke of Monmouth during the Monmouth Rebellion in 1685, who sharpened their swords before battle, however this is unlikely to be the true source of the marks.

The parish is part of the benefice of Westonzoyland with Chedzoy within the Sedgemoor deanery.

== See also ==
- Grade I listed buildings in Sedgemoor
- List of Somerset towers
- List of ecclesiastical parishes in the Diocese of Bath and Wells
