= Church of St John the Baptist, Axbridge =

Church in Somerset, England

Church of St John the Baptist
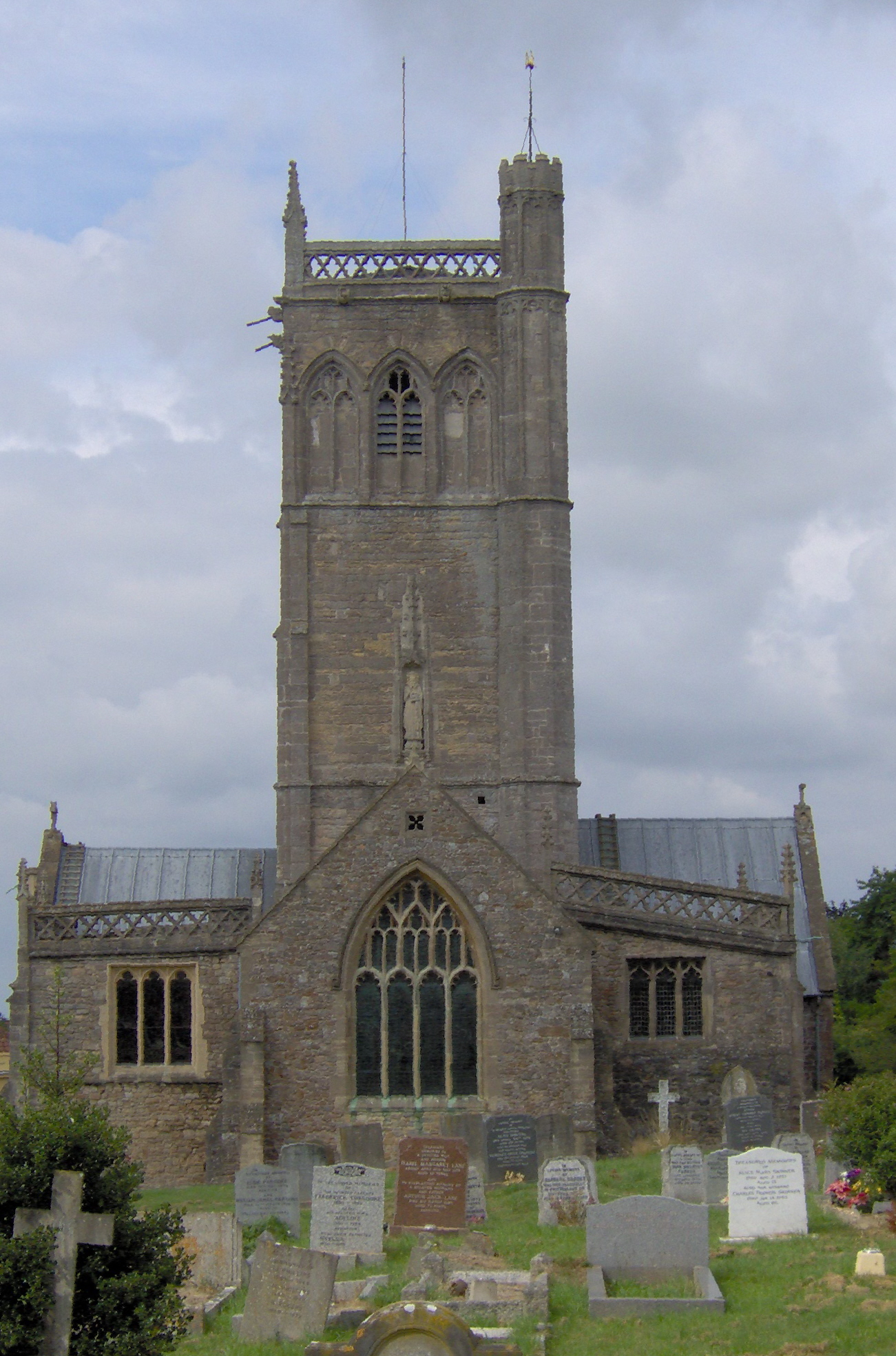

- Location within Somerset

General information
- Location: Axbridge, England
- Coordinates: 51.2877°N 2.8166°W
- Completed: c.1400
- Renovated: 1888

Renovating team
- Architect: J. D. Sedding

Listed Building – Grade I
- Designated: 9 February 1961
- Reference no.: 1173117

The Church of St John the Baptist in Axbridge, Somerset, England, was built in the 13th century and has been designated as a grade I listed building.

Work on the current building began in the early 15th century, and grew from an earlier building dating back to about 1230. The church is built of limestone and decorated with Doulting stone, while the steps are an interesting example of dolomitic conglomerate, which is called puddingstone.

The crossing tower, which was built around 1400, is over 100 feet (30 m) high, and holds six bells, one of which dating from 1723 was made by Edward Bilbie of the Bilbie family. The statue on the east side is that of St John the Baptist. On the west side is a king — perhaps Henry VII, which would place it after 1485. The North aisle ceiling retains some mediaeval painted panels, and amongst the carved bosses is the head of a Green Man, with leaves sprouting around his face. The nave roof is Jacobean and dates from 1636. The church was restored by John Dando Sedding in the 1880s.

The churchyard contains a Commonwealth war grave of a Dorsetshire Regiment soldier of World War II.

== See also ==
- List of Grade I listed buildings in Sedgemoor
- List of towers in Somerset
- List of ecclesiastical parishes in the Diocese of Bath and Wells
