= Archie Wickham =

English cricketer, clergyman, and entomologist

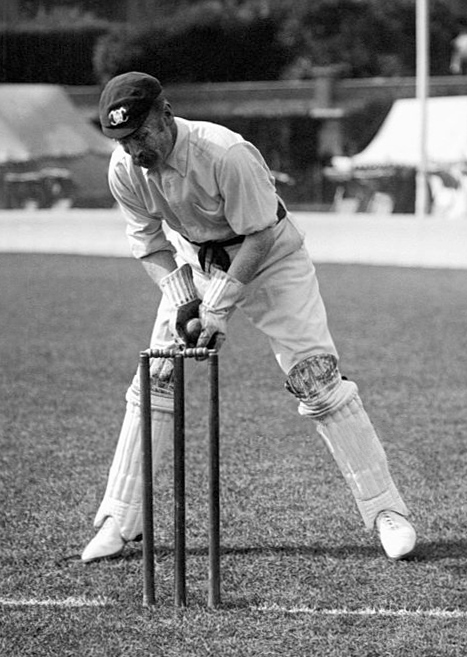
- Archie Wickham

Personal information
- Full name: Archdale Palmer Wickham
- Born: 9 November 1855; South Holmwood, Surrey, England
- Died: 13 October 1935 (aged 79); Highbridge, Somerset, England
- Batting: Right-handed
- Role: Wicket-keeper

Domestic team information
- Years: Team
- 1876–1878: Oxford University
- 1881–1890: Norfolk
- 1891–1907: Somerset
- First-class debut: 25 May 1876 Oxford University v Marylebone Cricket Club
- Last First-class: 11 July 1907 Somerset v Warwickshire

Career statistics
Competition	First-class
Matches	93
Runs scored	760
Batting average	8.83
100s/50s	0/0
Top score	28
Balls bowled	10
Wickets	0
Bowling average	–
5 wickets in innings	0
10 wickets in match	0
Best bowling	–
Catches/stumpings	90/60
- Source: CricketArchive, 13 March 2010

Archdale Palmer Wickham (9 November 1855 – 13 October 1935) was an English Anglican clergyman, first-class cricketer and entomologist.

== Clerical career ==
Wickham was the son of the Rev. Edmund Dawe Wickham of Holmwood, and was educated at Marlborough College. He matriculated in 1874 at New College, Oxford, where he read Classics, and graduated B.A. in 1879. He then prepared for the priesthood at Leeds Clergy School and was ordained. After three curacies he was vicar of Martock, Somerset, from 1888 to 1911 and a prebendary of Wells Cathedral from 1904 to 1911. He was then vicar of East Brent, Somerset, from 1911 until his death in 1935.

== Cricket career ==
Wickham played 82 first-class matches for Somerset County Cricket Club between 1891 and 1907. He also played for a number of representative teams and for Oxford University, and played second-class cricket for Norfolk County Cricket Club from 1881 to 1890. A wicket-keeper and right-handed batsman, he scored 760 career first-class runs, and claimed 90 catches and 60 stumpings. He had a distinctive wicket-keeping stance, bending low with his feet more than a metre apart.

Playing for Somerset against Hampshire in the County Championship in 1899, Wickham kept throughout Hampshire's innings of 672 for 7 without conceding a bye. This remained a record in the Championship until 2002. In 1901, playing for Somerset against Oxford University, he kept wicket for both sides: when the Oxford wicketkeeper was injured during the match, Wickham volunteered to stand in briefly for him. It is the only known instance in first-class cricket of a player keeping wickets for both sides in the same match.

Wickham was not noted for his batting, and usually batted at number 11. However, when he made his highest first-class score of 28, he top-scored in Somerset's second innings as they struggled in vain to avoid an innings defeat against Gloucestershire in 1900.

== Personal life ==
Wickham was a renowned amateur entomologist, specializing in the Lepidoptera. In 1917 he was elected a Fellow of the Royal Entomological Society. His collection of butterflies numbered many thousands. After his death his collection of specimens and manuscripts was lodged at the British Museum.

Wickham married firstly, in 1883, Emily Helena McPherson Baldwin (1856–1890), daughter of the Rev. John Richard Baldwin, a chaplain in India. They had a daughter and two sons. He and his second wife, Harriet Elizabeth Strong, who came from a family of vicars and brewers, had a son and two daughters.
