= St Mary's Church, Berrow =

Church in Somerset, England

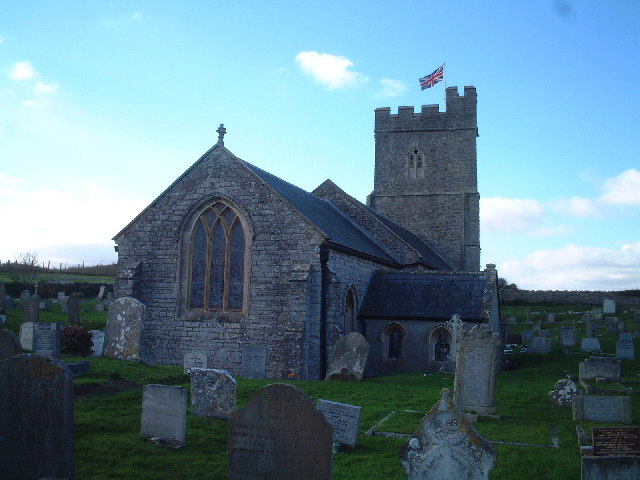

- Location within Somerset

General information
- Location: Berrow, England
- Coordinates: 51.2669°N 3.0135°W
- Completed: 13th century

Website
- www.berrowandbrean.co.uk

The Church of St Mary in Berrow, Somerset, England dates from the 13th century and was restored in the 19th. It has been designated as a grade I listed building.

The church is built of limestone from the Mendip Hills with Hamstone for the decoration. The south aisle is from the 15th century but was remodeled during the Victorian era.

The two-stage tower, which dates from the 15th century, contains a bell dating from 1801 and made by Thomas and James Bilbie of the Bilbie family, along with four other bells. It can be seen from the sea and was once painted white to act as a lighthouse.

The interior includes 14th and 15th century fonts.

The Anglican parish is part of the Berrow and Brean benefice within the archdeaconry of Wells.

== See also ==
- List of Grade I listed buildings in Sedgemoor
- List of towers in Somerset
- List of ecclesiastical parishes in the Diocese of Bath and Wells
