= Gothelney Hall =

Building in Somerset, England

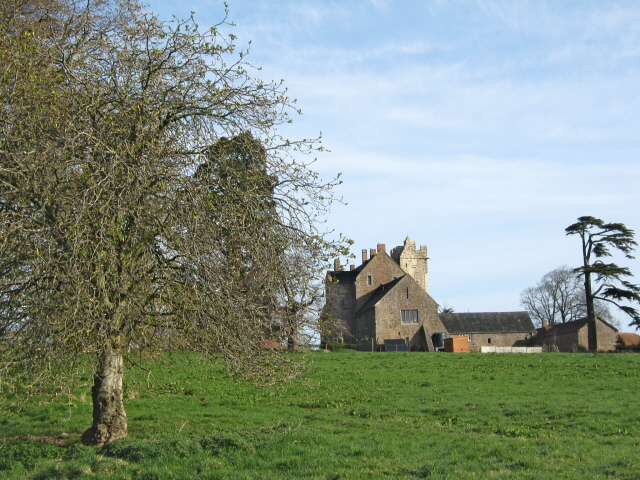

- Location within Somerset

General information
- Location: Spaxton, England
- Coordinates: 51.1327°N 3.0627°W
- Completed: 15th century

Gothelney Hall, also known as Gothelney Manor Farmhouse, located in the parish of Spaxton, Somerset, England was built in the 15th century and has been designated as a Grade I listed building.

The site was used for an earlier building dated by dendrochronology to between 1238 and 1411.

The tall house in the centre of the building dates from the 15th century, however this was extended in the 16th century, with further additions and renovations in the 17th and 19th centuries. Many of the original roof timbers survive. It was originally surrounded by a moat.

In World War II the house was used by the War Department and afterwards became a kindergarten. It was later used as a farmhouse and farm outbuildings can be found to the rear. The house remains a private dwelling and centre of a working farm.

== See also ==
- List of Grade I listed buildings in Sedgemoor
