= St Bartholomew's Church, Lyng =

Church in Somerset, England

Church of St Bartholomew
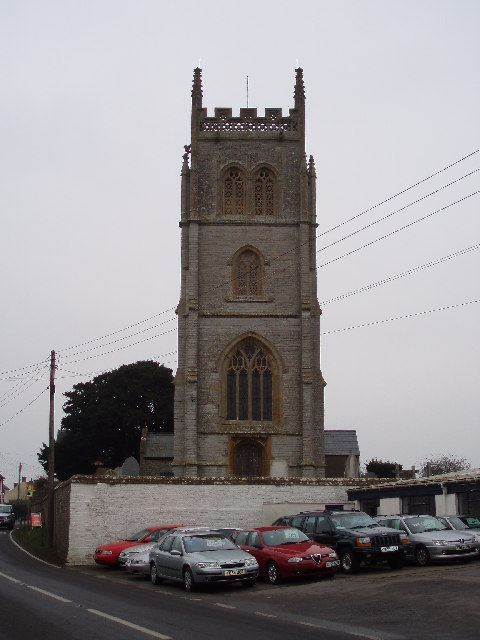

- Location within Somerset

General information
- Location: Lyng, England
- Coordinates: 51.0553°N 2.9537°W
- Completed: 14th century

The Church of St Bartholomew at East Lyng in the parish of Lyng, Somerset, England dates from the 14th century and has been designated as a Grade I listed building.

The Anglican church is dedicated to St Bartholomew, and is thought to have been built by the monks who were displaced from Athelney Abbey when it was dissolved by King Henry VIII of England in 1539. It stands on the site of an earlier fortress.

The ornate three-stage tower, which was built around 1497, is of lias with hamstone dressings supported by set-back buttresses connected diagonally across the angles of the tower on the bottom two stages; these terminate as diagonal pinnacles on shafts at the third stage. The paired two-light bell-chamber windows have Somerset tracery flanked by attached shafts and pinnacles, with quatrefoil grilles. There are similar single windows on the stage below. On the stonework are hunky punks representing dragons with the one on the left side of the west face being a mixture between a Basilisk or Cockatrice and a Griffin.

== See also ==
- List of Grade I listed buildings in Sedgemoor
- List of towers in Somerset
- List of ecclesiastical parishes in the Diocese of Bath and Wells
