= Church of St Mary the Virgin, Westonzoyland =

Church in Somerset, England

Church of St Mary the Virgin
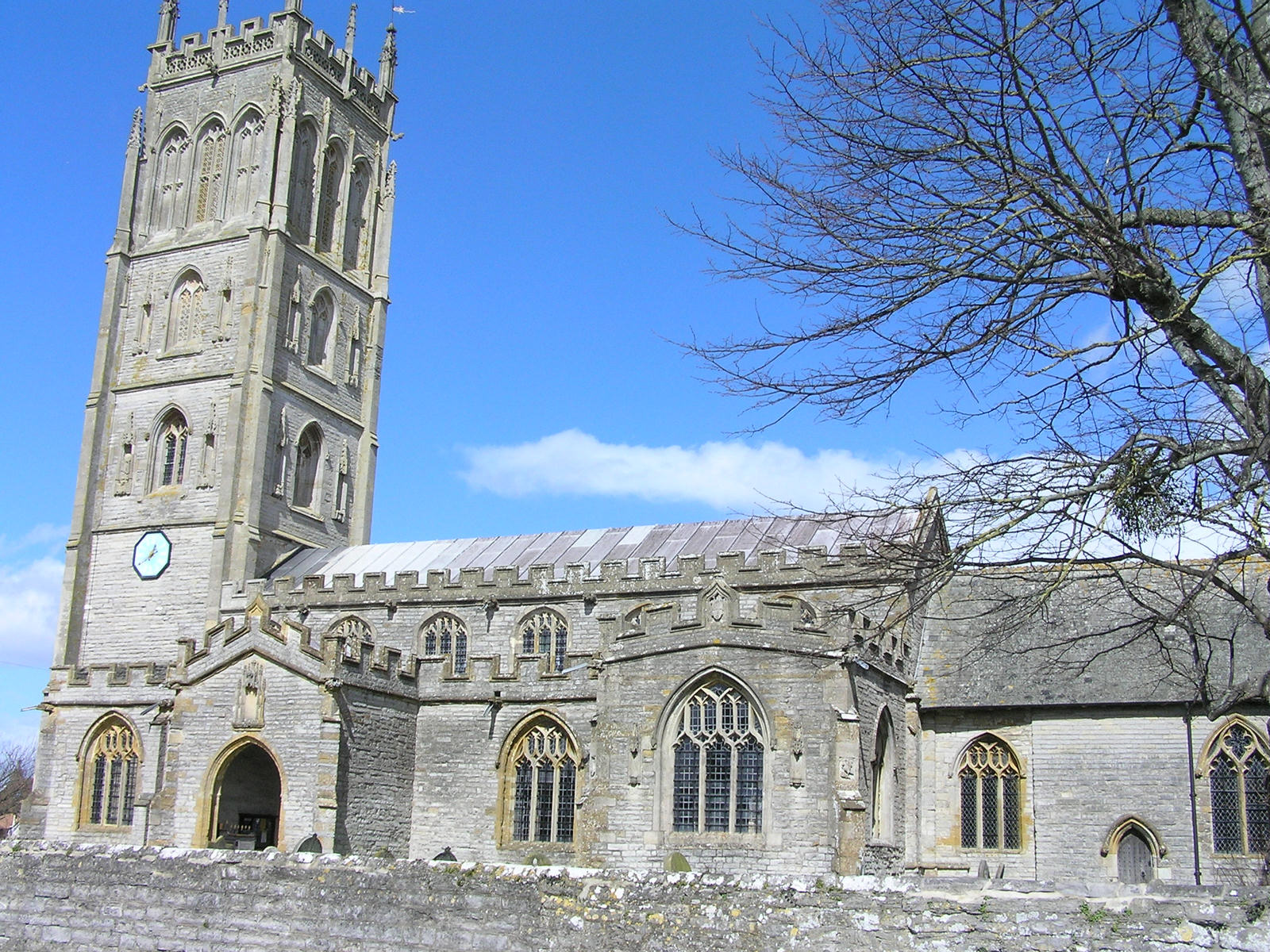

- Location within Somerset

General information
- Location: Westonzoyland, England
- Coordinates: 51.1087°N 2.9274°W
- Completed: 13th century

The Church of St Mary the Virgin in Westonzoyland, Somerset, England dates from the 13th century and has been designated as a Grade I listed building.

St Mary's Parish Church, with its 15th-century carved timber roof, has a link with two conflicts. It served as a prison for around 500 troops after the Battle of Sedgemoor.

From 1508 the vicar was Hugh Inge who went on to hold the offices of Bishop of Meath, Archbishop of Dublin and Lord Chancellor of Ireland.

The four-stage tower, which dates from around 1470, has an embattled parapet with quatrefoil arcading, and set-back buttresses which terminate in pinnacles on the bell-chamber stage. There are six bells in the tower. On the corners of the tower are hunky punks representing dragons.

Restoration during the 1930s of the roof was funded by public subscription and carried out by W. D. Caroe.

The church contains a corner dedicated to local airmen who lost their lives in 1918 and 1919 and post World War II in the early 1950s. The current vicar is The Reverend Dr Jane Sutton. The parish is part of the benefice of Westonzoyland with Chedzoy within the Diocese of Bath and Wells.

== See also ==
- List of Grade I listed buildings in Sedgemoor
- List of towers in Somerset
- List of ecclesiastical parishes in the Diocese of Bath and Wells
