= Castle Street, Bridgwater =

Street in Bridgwater, Somerset, England

Castle Street
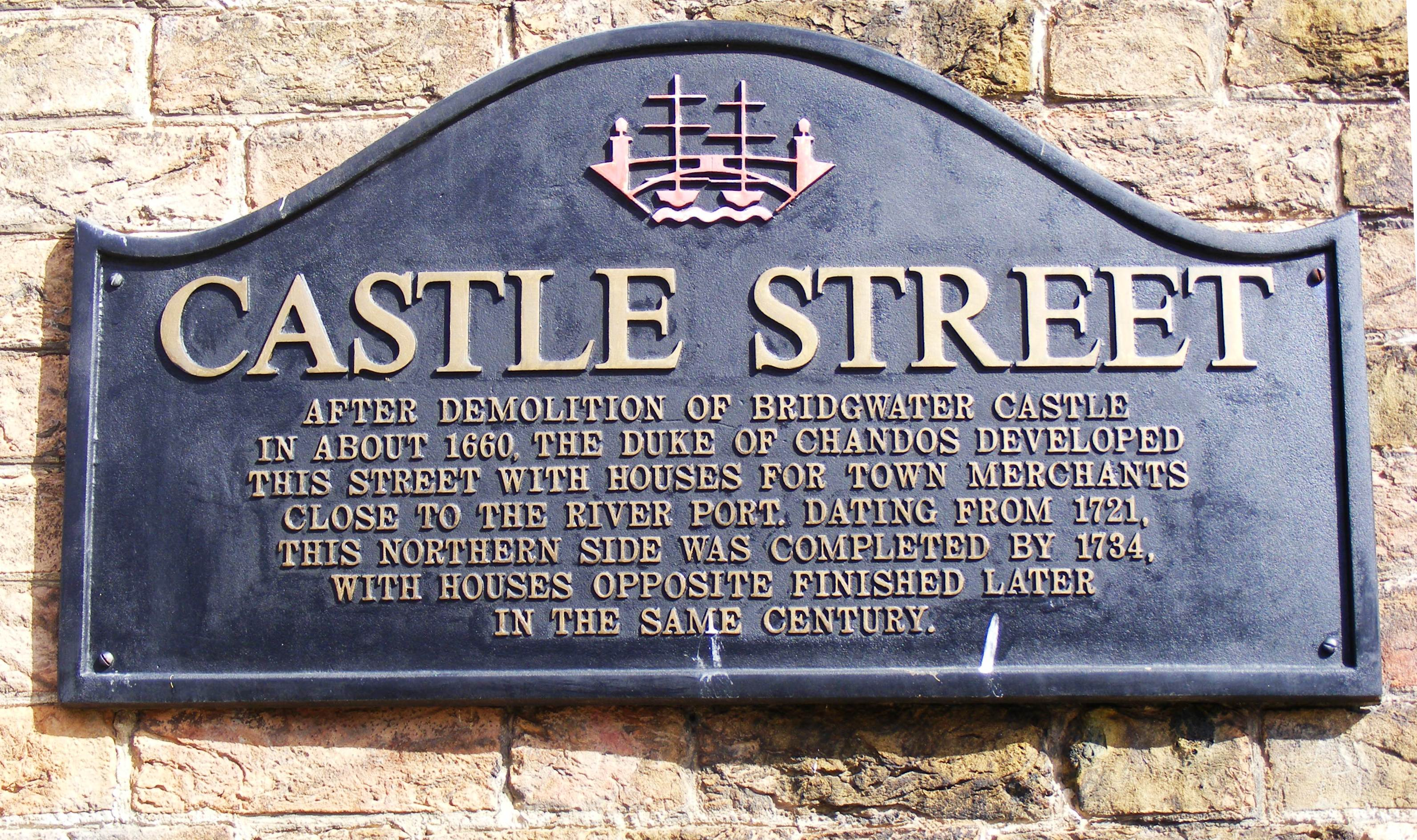
- Commemorative plaque

- Location within Somerset

General information
- Architectural style: Georgian
- Location: Bridgwater, England
- Coordinates: 51.1295°N 3.0025°W
- Construction started: 1723
- Completed: 1728
- Client: James Brydges, 1st Duke of Chandos

Design and construction
- Architect: Benjamin Holloway

Castle Street in Bridgwater, Somerset, England was built in the 1720s, on a site previously occupied by Bridgwater Castle, by Benjamin Holloway or Fort and Shepherd, the Duke's London surveyors for James Brydges, 1st Duke of Chandos. It was originally called Chandos Street. Many of the buildings have been designated as Grade I Listed buildings.

The buildings are made of red and yellow Flemish-bond brick, with moulded stone coping to the parapet, and follow very similar lines. They form an important group, unusual for their scale and ambition outside London's West End.

The buildings close to the quay on the River Parrett were built for the merchants who managed trade through the port, with the first bridge having been constructed in 1200 AD. Quays were built in 1424; with another quay, the Langport slip, being built in 1488 upstream of the town bridge. The river was navigable, with care, to Bridgwater town bridge by 400–500 tonne vessels. By trans-shipping into barges at the town bridge the Parrett was navigable as far as Langport and (via the River Yeo) to Ilchester. Many of the buildings still have undercroft vaults, some of which were used by the Customs House which was once at the lower end of Castle Street and led to the naming of Bond Street which adjoins Castle Street.

Castle Street was used as a location in the 1963 film Tom Jones.

In 2008, during sewer renovation work under Castle Street, a section of the curtain wall of the castle and a tunnel used to transport goods from the port were discovered.

== South side ==
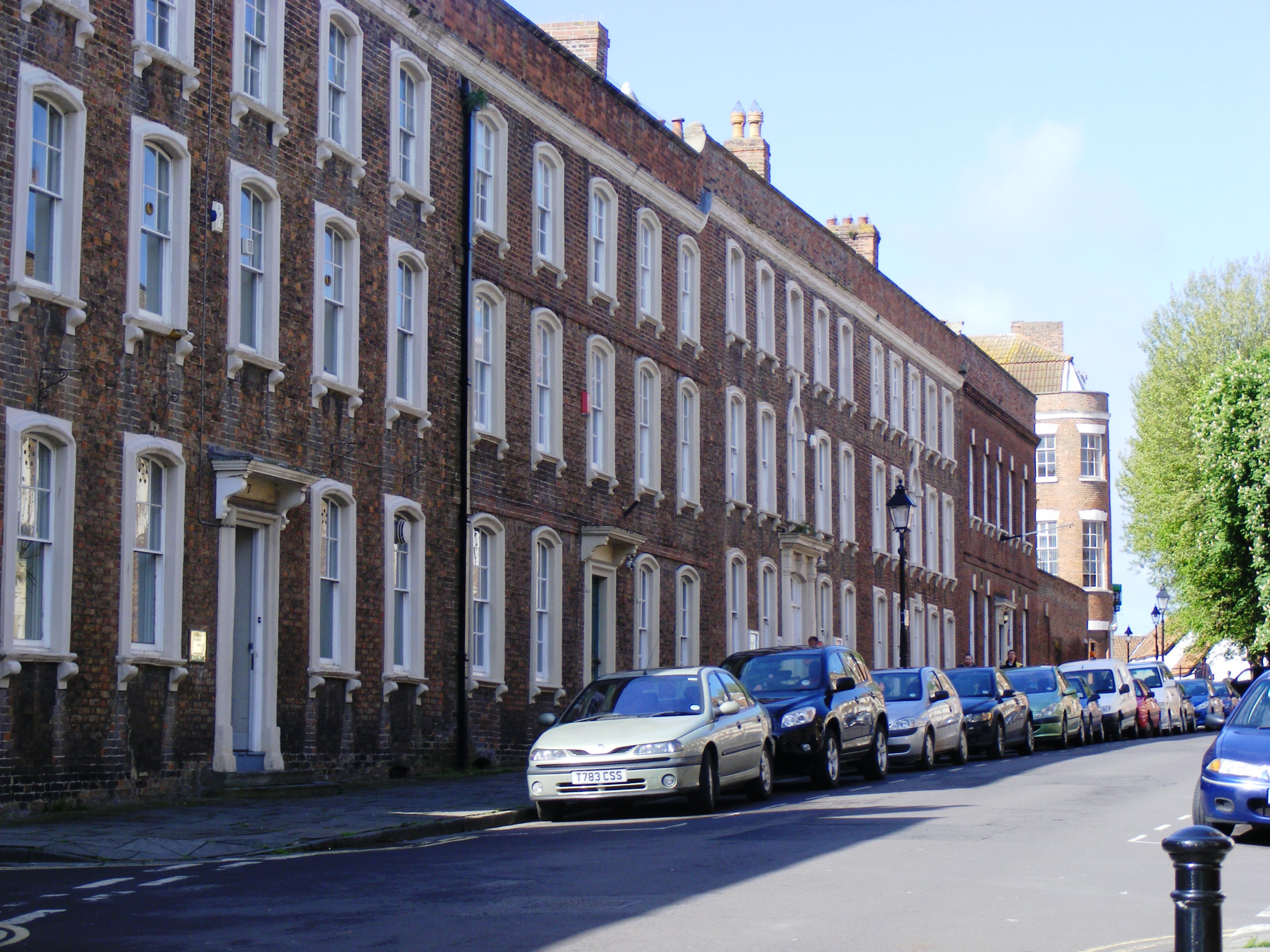
South side

Number 1 on the corner with West Quay and very close to the River Parrett was built as the Harbour Master's house and is now used as offices.

Number 3 and 5 were originally separate houses but have now been made into one building and are used as offices. Number 7 and 9 follow the same pattern.

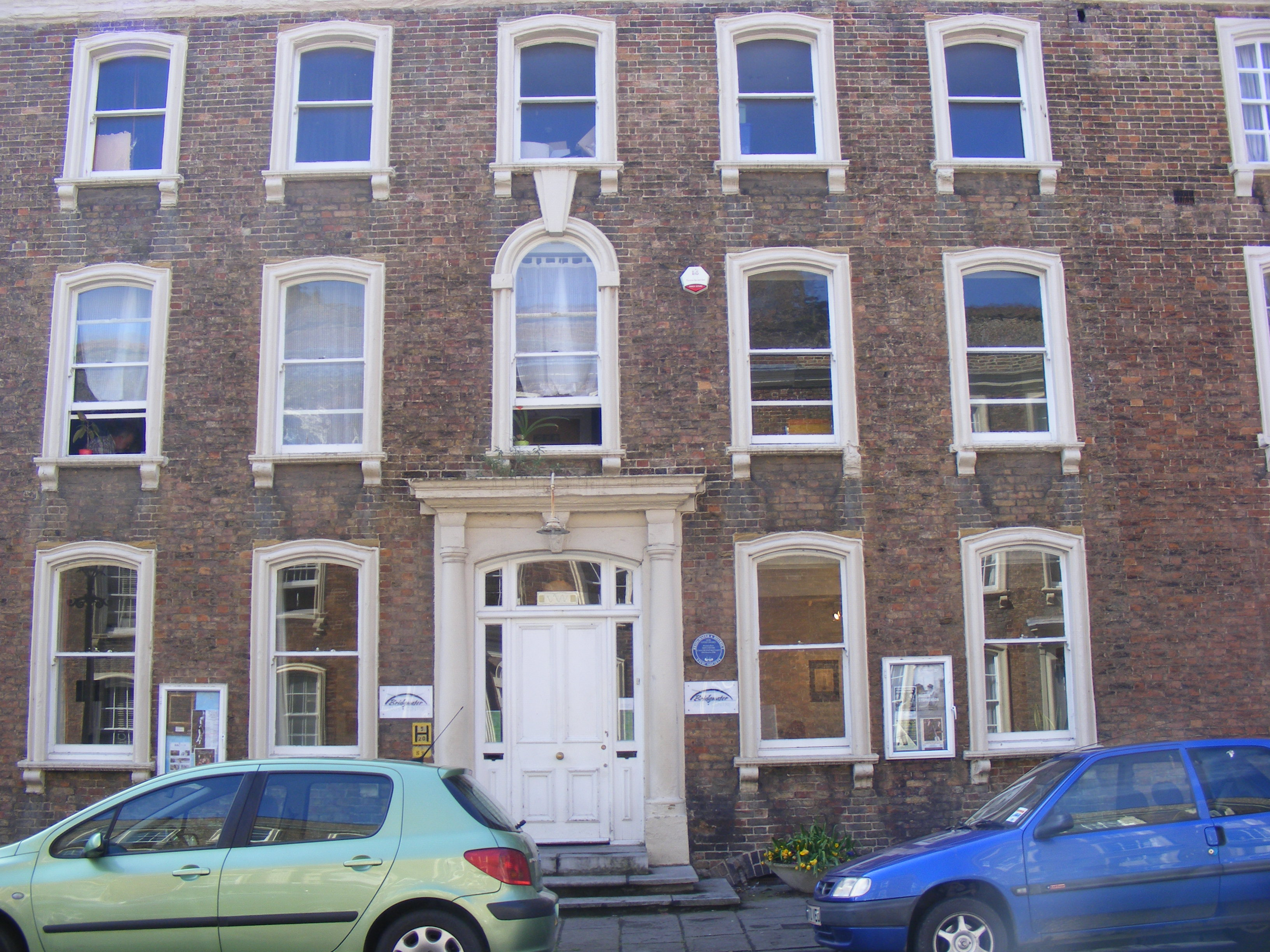
Bridgwater Arts Centre

Numbers 11 and 13 have been used as Bridgwater Arts Centre since 1946. Many of the original interior of the building has been lost but the plaster ceiling mouldings and the fireplace are original, as are the wooden side cupboards, the window panels and window seats. It was the venue for the first post-war meeting of the Congres Internationaux d'Architecture Moderne in 1947. Number 9 was purchased by Bridgwater Borough Council in 1966, which then passed into the ownership of Sedgemoor District Council in 1974. Number eleven Castle Street was acquired as part of the arts centre in 1982.

Number 15 is known as Legion House. It was originally built as a private house in the mid 18th century but is now used by the British Legion.

== North side ==
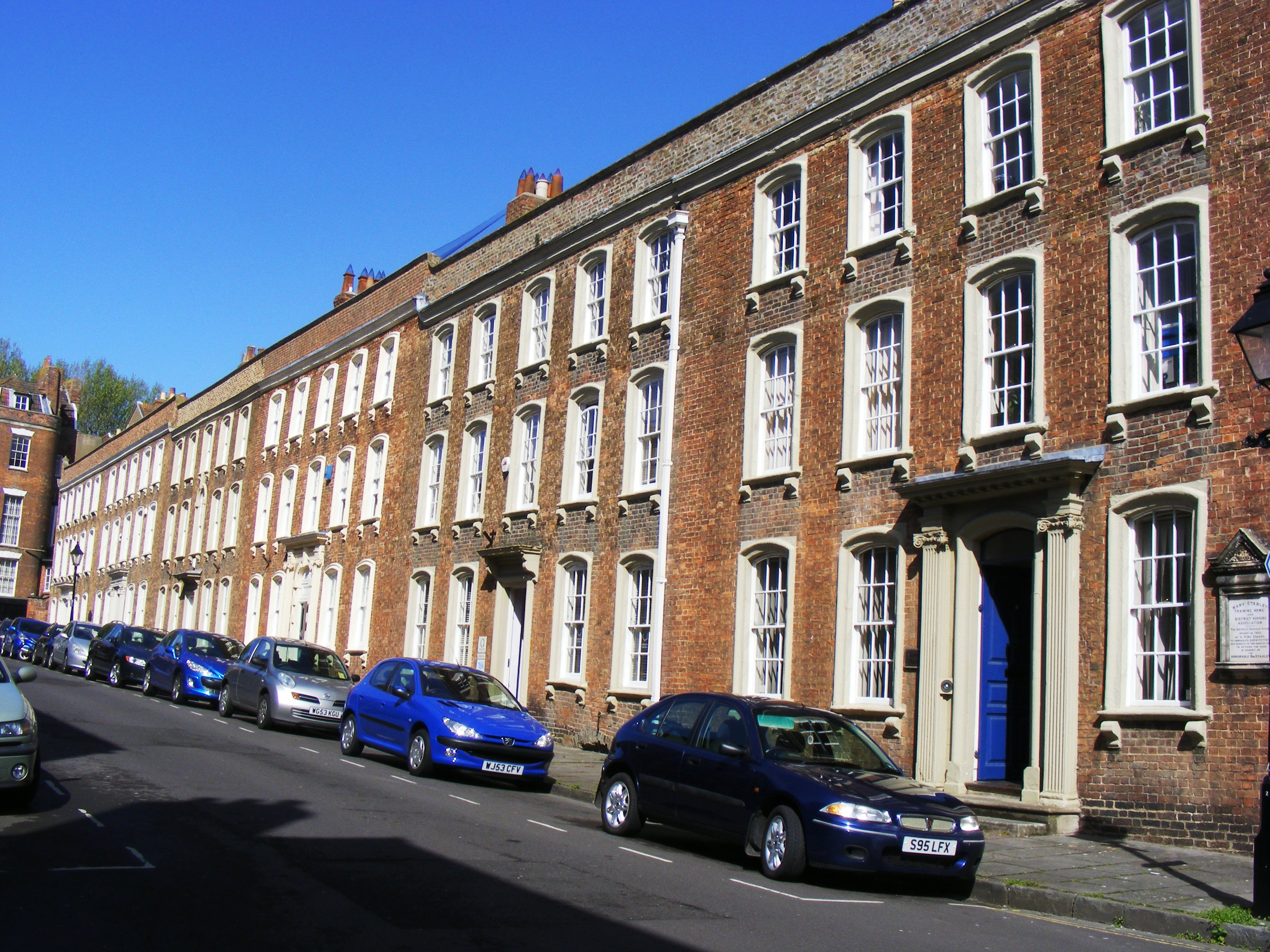
North side

Number 2 which is on the corner with West Quay has the same Flemish-bond brick but has been painted.

Number 4 has a vertical joint to Number 1 Bond Street on the left.

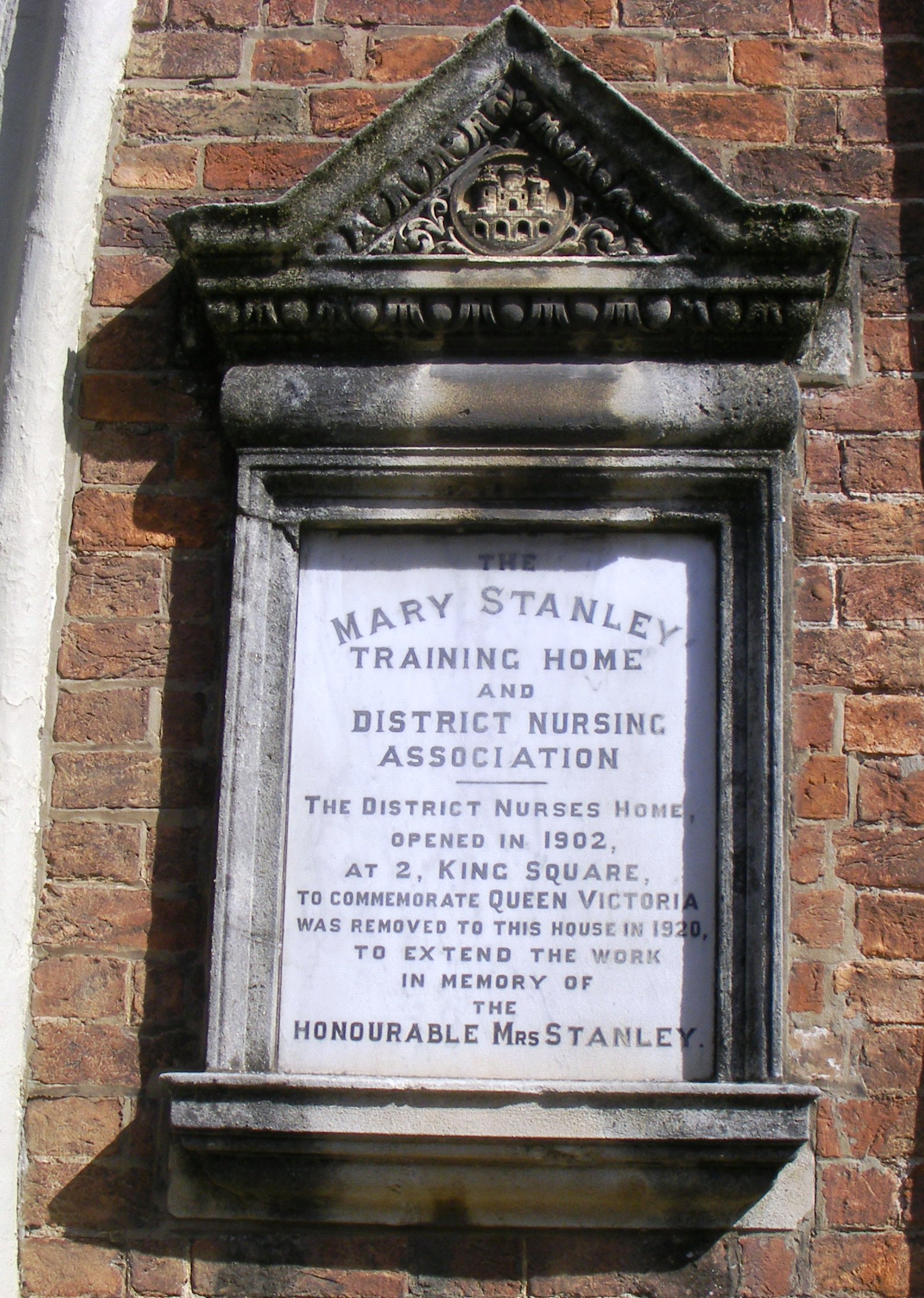
Plaque commemorating Mary Stanley's Nursing Home

Numbers 6, 8, 10 and 12 were originally a merchants houses and was used as nursing home from 1920 to 1990. The district nurses home originally opened in 1902 at Number 2 King Square to commemorate Queen Victoria but was moved to Castle Street in 1926.

Numbers 6 to 14 were also built as merchants houses and are now offices.

== See also ==
- List of Grade I listed buildings in Sedgemoor
