= Berrow, Somerset =

Village and civil parish in Somerset, England

Coordinates: 51.267°N 3.012°W

Berrow
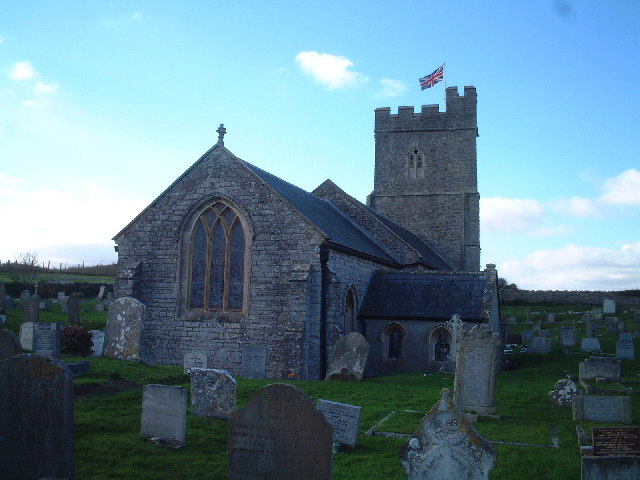
- St Mary's church

- Location within Somerset
- Population: 1,534
- OS grid reference: ST295525
- Unitary authority: Somerset Council
- Ceremonial county: Somerset
- Region: South West
- Country: England
- Sovereign state: United Kingdom
- Post town: BURNHAM-ON-SEA
- Postcode district: TA8
- Dialling code: 01278
- Police: Avon and Somerset
- Fire: Devon and Somerset
- Ambulance: South Western
- UK Parliament: Bridgwater

Berrow is a small residential coastal village and holiday area, a civil parish in Somerset, England, situated in between Burnham-on-Sea and Brean.

According to the 2011 census it had a population of 1,534.

== History ==
Berrow was part of the hundred of Brent-cum-Wrington.

== Governance ==
The parish council has responsibility for local issues, including setting an annual precept (local rate) to cover the council's operating costs and producing annual accounts for public scrutiny. The parish council evaluates local planning applications and works with the local police, district council officers, and neighbourhood watch groups on matters of crime, security, and traffic. The parish council's role also includes initiating projects for the maintenance and repair of parish facilities, as well as consulting with the district council on the maintenance, repair, and improvement of highways, drainage, footpaths, public transport, and street cleaning. Conservation matters (including trees and listed buildings) and environmental issues are also the responsibility of the council.

For local government purposes, since 1 April 2023, the village comes under the unitary authority of Somerset Council. Prior to this, it was part of the non-metropolitan district of Sedgemoor, which was formed on 1 April 1974 under the Local Government Act 1972, having previously been part of Axbridge Rural District.

An electoral ward of the same name exists. Although Berrow is the most populous area the ward stretches north along the coast to Brean. The total population of this ward taken from the 2011 census was 2,169.

It is also part of the a county constituency represented in the House of Commons of the Parliament of the United Kingdom. It elects one Member of Parliament (MP) by the first past the post system of election. It was part of the South West England constituency of the European Parliament prior to Britain leaving the European Union in January 2020, which elected seven MEPs using the d'Hondt method of party-list proportional representation.

== Church ==
The Church of St Mary dates from the 13th century and was restored in the 19th. The tower contains a bell dating from 1801 and made by Thomas and James Bilbie of the Bilbie family. It has been designated by English Heritage as a grade I listed building.

== Beach and dunes ==
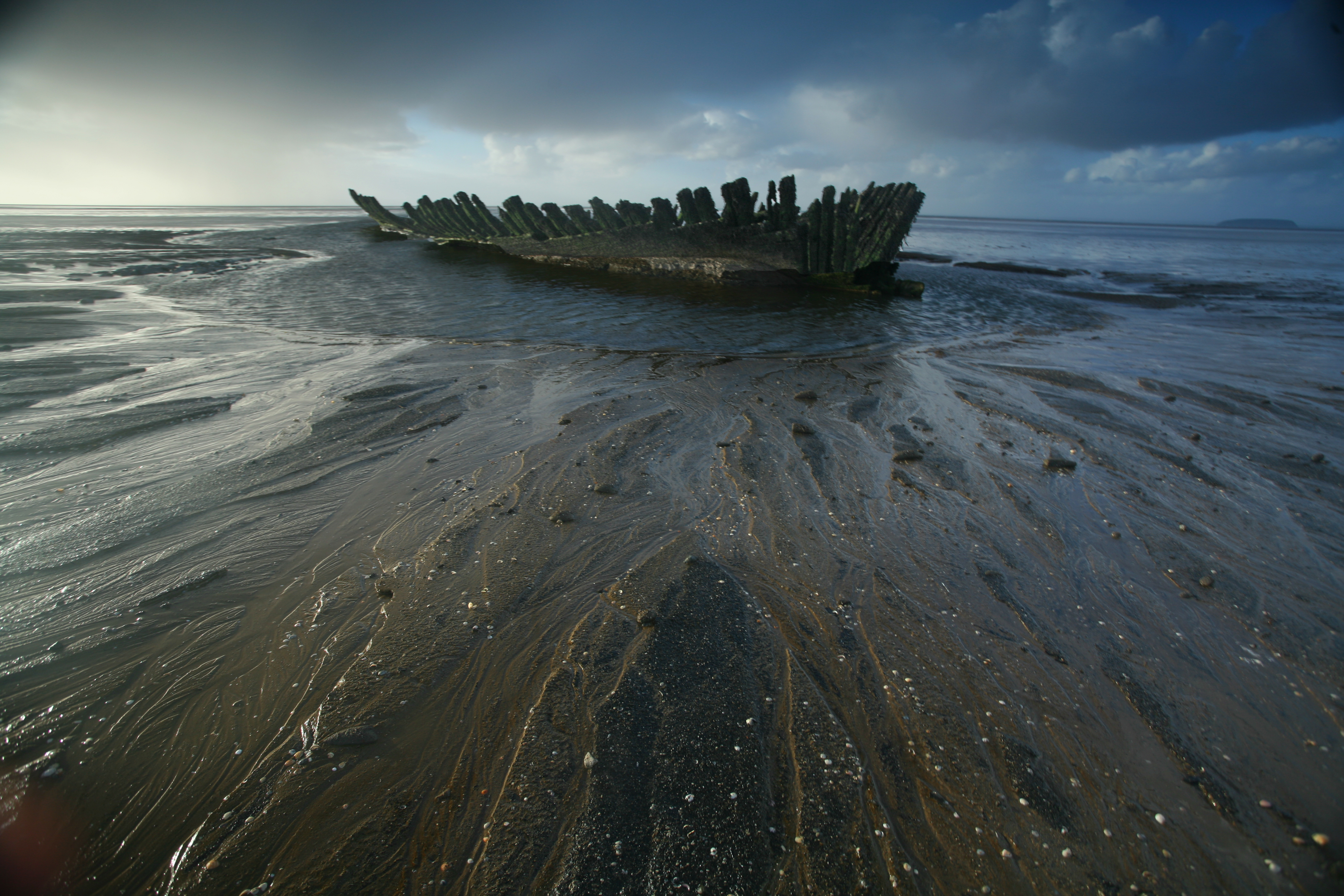
The wreck of the barque Nornen in 2006

Berrow beach was awarded the Blue flag rural beach award in 2005. The beach is home to the shipwreck of the Norwegian barque Nornen, which ran aground on 3 March 1897. The ship was built in 1876 as the Maipu in Bordeaux, before being sold to S. C. Larson in Norway and renamed. She ran aground in a storm and most of the structure was removed for scrap. In July 2003, Sedgemoor District Council threatened to remove the wreck from the beach fearing it could be held liable if any jet-skiers were to hit the wreck while submerged at high tide.

Berrow Dunes, west of the village, has a golf course, and is a noted site for various unusual plants, including a strong colony of lizard orchids. A 200 hectare (494 acre) area was designated in 1952 as a Site of Special Scientific Interest.

Berrow Marsh, contained within the dunes between the village and the beach, is a mixture of reedbed and salt marsh. Birds found here include many wetland species such as reed and sedge warbler and in winter occasional jack snipe amongst large numbers of common snipe.

== Notable people ==
- Charles Brooke, Rajah of Sarawak born in the vicarage in 1829
