= Lympsham =

Village in Somerset, England

Coordinates: 51.286°N 2.955°W

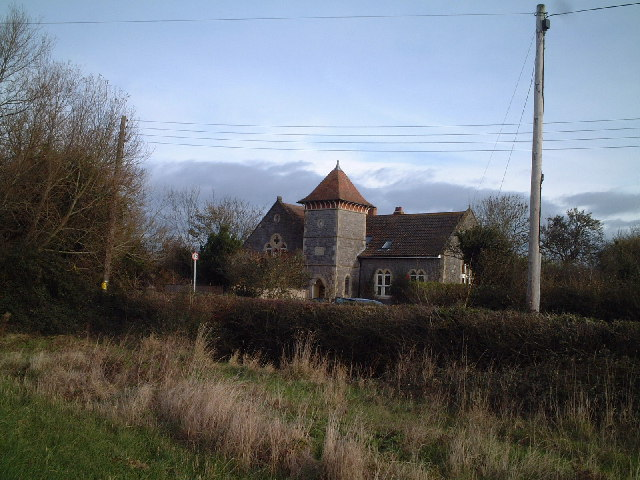
- Former Methodist Chapel - now converted to a private dwelling

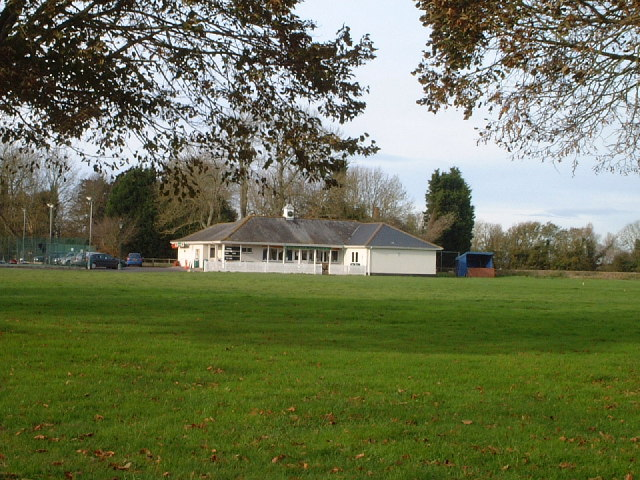
- Cricket Pavilion

- Location within Somerset
- Population: 960
- OS grid reference: ST335545
- Unitary authority: Somerset Council
- Ceremonial county: Somerset
- Region: South West
- Country: England
- Sovereign state: United Kingdom
- Post town: WESTON-SUPER-MARE
- Postcode district: BS24
- Dialling code: 01934
- Police: Avon and Somerset
- Fire: Devon and Somerset
- Ambulance: South Western
- UK Parliament: Wells and Mendip Hills

Lympsham is a village and civil parish six miles west of Axbridge and six miles south-east of Weston-super-Mare, close to the River Axe in Somerset, England. The parish includes the hamlet of Wick where Wick Farmhouse dates from the mid 18th century.

== History ==
It has been suggested that the name means 'a suitable home' from the Old English ge-limplic and ham. More probable is a combination of a personal name beginning "Lin-" or something like "lind-pyll" (pool where lime trees grow) with "ham" (in Old English this usually means either "village" or "estate"). The first appearance of the name in records is in 1086 Domesday Survey: It is certain that King William laid a heavy hand on the estates of the monastery—'quamplures ex suis commilitionibus ex Glastoniæ feudavit possessionibus.' (fn. 34) Malmesbury does not tell us of the losses but only the fact that afterwards the Conqueror relented somewhat towards this old English monastery, and gave back the estates of Podimore, Milton, Fullbrook, Berrow, Burrington, Lympelesham, Blackford and Wootton. At the time of the Conquest the monks suffered the loss of some of their estates, but these were afterwards recovered and even William the Conqueror made reparation for what he had robbed them of. The possessions of the abbey amounted to the huge extent of 818 hides. The 'twelve hides' consisting of the site, precincts and immediate demesne of the abbey was regarded as an ungeldable and unhidated liberty of which the islands of Meare, Panborough, and Edgarley formed part. As far as these estates lay in Somerset the details of the endowment will be found in the account of the Survey A History of the County of Somerset: Volume 2 Edited by William Page.

It is likely that efforts were made to improve the drainage of the soil in the area during the Saxon period. In 1129, the Abbot of Glastonbury Abbey recorded that corn was growing here on land which had previously been classified as worthless.

== Governance ==
The parish council has responsibility for local issues, including setting an annual precept (local rate) to cover the council’s operating costs and producing annual accounts for public scrutiny. The parish council evaluates local planning applications and works with the local police, district council officers, and neighbourhood watch groups on matters of crime, security, and traffic. The parish council's role also includes initiating projects for the maintenance and repair of parish facilities, as well as consulting with the district council on the maintenance, repair, and improvement of highways, drainage, footpaths, public transport, and street cleaning. Conservation matters (including trees and listed buildings) and environmental issues are also the responsibility of the council.

For local government purposes, since 1 April 2023, the village comes under the unitary authority of Somerset Council. Prior to this, it was part of the non-metropolitan district of Sedgemoor, which was formed on 1 April 1974 under the Local Government Act 1972, having previously been part of Axbridge Rural District.

It is also part of the Wells and Mendip Hills constituency represented in the House of Commons of the Parliament of the United Kingdom. It elects one Member of Parliament (MP) by the first past the post system of election.

== Education ==
The school is home to the Lympsham Church of England Academy, which educates children between the ages of 2 and 9.

== Religious sites ==
The Church of St Christopher originates from the 15th century, but includes significant 19th-century restoration by Rev A. J. Stephenson and his son, J. H. Stephenson. It has been designated by English Heritage as a Grade I listed building.

== Notable people ==
- Sir William Comer Petheram (1835–1922), a judge in India.

== See also ==
- Bristol Channel floods, 1607
