= St Margaret's Church, Spaxton =

Church in Somerset, England

Church of St Margaret
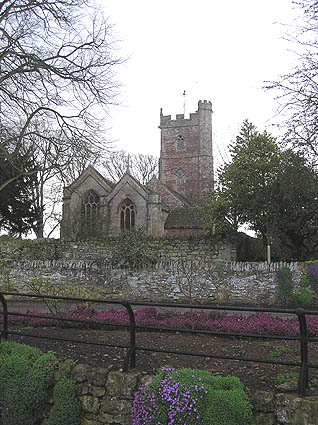

- Location within Somerset

General information
- Location: Spaxton, England
- Coordinates: 51.1269°N 3.1069°W
- Completed: 15th century

The Church of St Margaret in Spaxton, Somerset, England has some parts from the 12th and 13th centuries but is predominantly from the 15th century, and was restored in 1895. It has been designated as a Grade I listed building.

The three-bay nave has a south aisle and includes Norman herringbone stonework. The tower can be dated to 1434 from a will bequeathing money for its construction. It was extended in the 14th century. The chancel has a south transept chapel and a north chapel which has been turned into a vestry.

The tower contains six bells, two of which date from the late 17th century. Parts of the clock mechanism are from the 16th.

The parish is part of the benefice of Aisholt, Enmore, Goathurst, Nether Stowey, Over Stowey and Spaxton with Charlynch within the Quantock deanery.

== See also ==
- Grade I listed buildings in Sedgemoor
- List of Somerset towers
- List of ecclesiastical parishes in the Diocese of Bath and Wells
