= Church of St Edward King and Martyr, Goathurst =

Church in Somerset, England

Church of St Edward King and Martyr
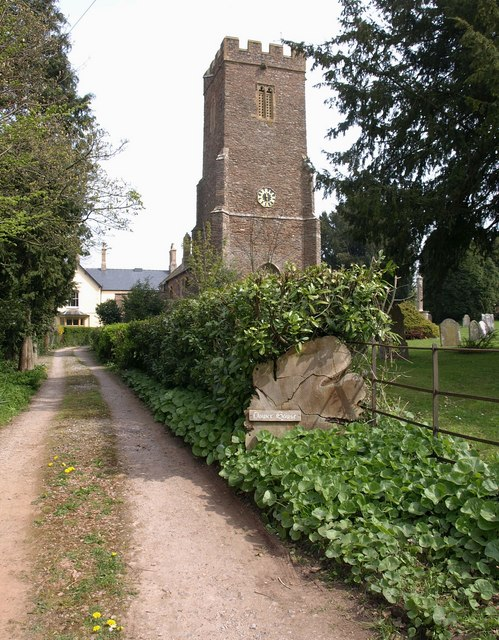

- Location within Somerset

General information
- Location: Goathurst, England
- Coordinates: 51.1036°N 3.0630°W
- Completed: 14th century

The Church of St Edward King and Martyr in Goathurst, Somerset, England, dates from the 14th century and has been designated as a Grade I listed building.

The parish was originally part of the Royal Forest of North Petherton and its first squire owned St Edward's church. The dedication to Edward the Martyr is unusual; Edward was a young Saxon king who was murdered by his stepmother Elfrida in 978 at Corfe Castle in Dorset so that her own son would become king.

The church includes a 19th-century monument to three-year-old Isabella Kemeys, showing the child lying on a pillow holding a broken flower, and monuments to the Kemeys-Tynte family of Halswell House.

== See also ==
- List of Grade I listed buildings in Sedgemoor
- List of towers in Somerset
- List of ecclesiastical parishes in the Diocese of Bath and Wells
