= Othery =

Village in Somerset, England

Coordinates: 51.08°N 2.88°W

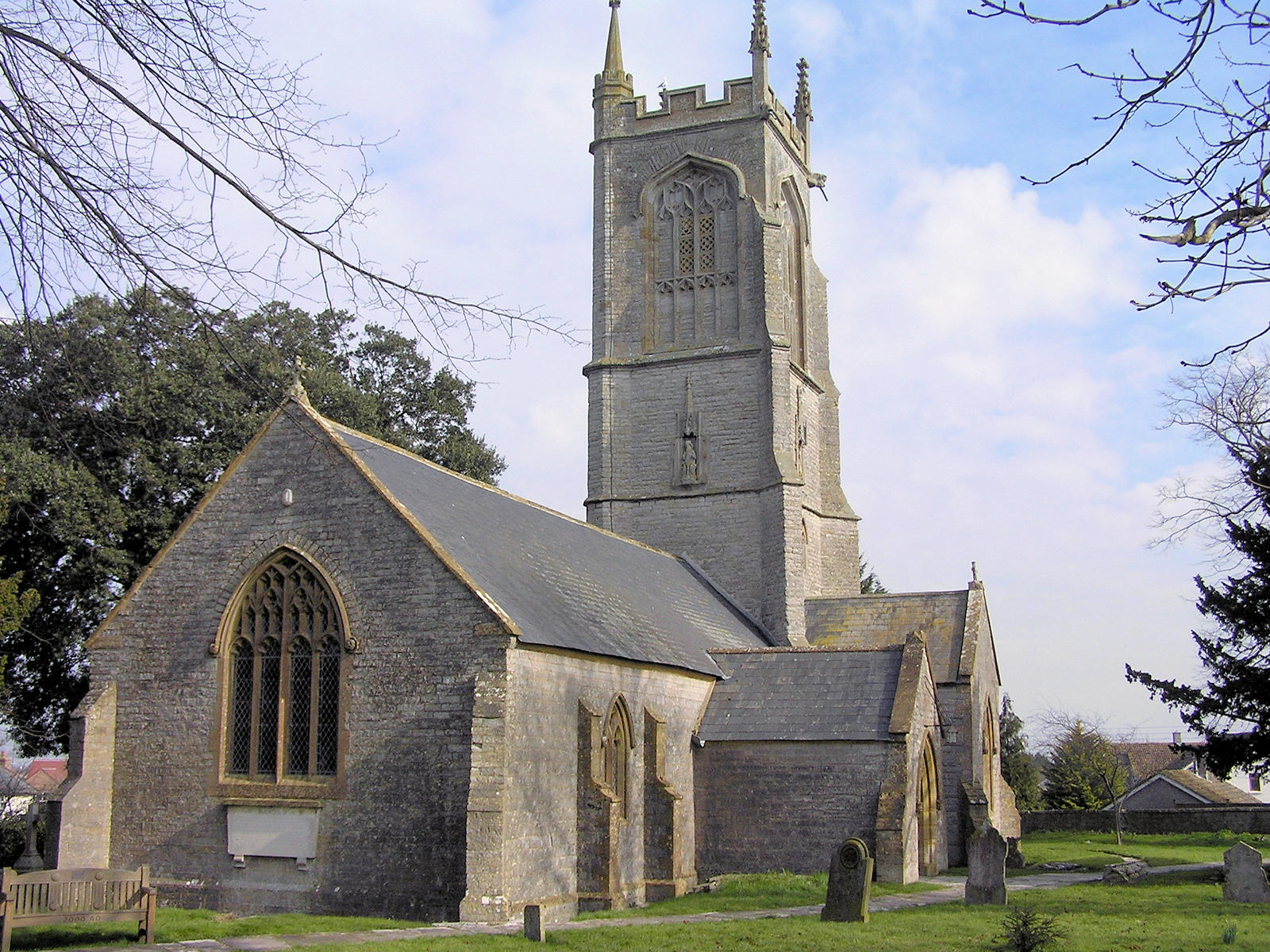
- The Church of St Michael

- Location within Somerset
- Population: 642 (2011)
- OS grid reference: ST3823
- Unitary authority: Somerset Council
- Ceremonial county: Somerset
- Region: South West
- Country: England
- Sovereign state: United Kingdom
- Post town: BRIDGWATER
- Postcode district: TA7
- Dialling code: 01823
- Police: Avon and Somerset
- Fire: Devon and Somerset
- Ambulance: South Western
- UK Parliament: Bridgwater

The parish and village of Othery, established in 1515, sits on a detached extension of Sowy island on the Somerset Levels. It is 7 miles (11 km) east of Bridgwater and 4 miles (6 km) north-west of Langport. It borders the hamlets and villages of Pathe, Burrowbridge, Middlezoy, Westonzoyland and Aller, which it meets at Beer Wall. The border with Burrowbridge was defined in 1985, reducing Othery to 553 ha (1,366 acres). Many of these borders are defined by ditches and walls created and rearranged, from the 13th century onwards, to drain and channel the waters of the River Cary and the River Parrett as they flooded the low-lying levels on their way to the Bristol Channel.

== History ==
The name means "Other-island". The "island" of Othery rising above the Levels is a mixed sedimentary and alluvial deposit: marl, Mercia mudstone, sand and gravel ("Burtle Beds"), peat, and deposits from the basin of the River Parrett. The moors on the shallowest deposits are just 13 feet (4 m) above sea level, with the highest hill, on the southwest side of Othery, standing 82 feet (25 m) above sea level.

The parish of Othery was part of the Whitley Hundred.

Othery once had three pubs, reduced to just one, The London Inn, which has now also closed. It had a village shop (closed), a post office (closed), a bakery (Maisey's, also now closed,) and a primary school. There is also a very active village hall. Othery borders two Sites of Special Scientific Interest, both designated in 1985: Southlake Moor and Sedgemoor, to the north of Beer Wall.

== Governance ==
The parish council has responsibility for local issues, including setting an annual precept (local rate) to cover the council’s operating costs and producing annual accounts for public scrutiny. The parish council evaluates local planning applications and works with the local police, district council officers, and neighbourhood watch groups on matters of crime, security, and traffic. The parish council's role also includes initiating projects for the maintenance and repair of parish facilities, as well as consulting with the district council on the maintenance, repair, and improvement of highways, drainage, footpaths, public transport, and street cleaning. Conservation matters (including trees and listed buildings) and environmental issues are also the responsibility of the council. The chairman of the Parish Council until 2019 was Councillor Mervyn Winslade MBE who stood down at the May elections. At the first meeting of the newly elected council, Councillor Anthony Bostock was elected Chairman. He remained in post until his resignation in May 2021. Since May 2021 Councillor Andrew Tizzard has been Chairman.

For local government purposes, since 1 April 2023, the village comes under the unitary authority of Somerset Council. Prior to this, it was part of the non-metropolitan district of Sedgemoor, which was formed on 1 April 1974 under the Local Government Act 1972, having previously been part of Bridgwater Rural District.

It is also part of the Bridgwater county constituency represented in the House of Commons of the Parliament of the United Kingdom. It elects one Member of Parliament (MP) by the first past the post system of election, and was part of the South West England constituency of the European Parliament prior to Britain leaving the European Union in January 2020, which elected seven MEPs using the d'Hondt method of party-list proportional representation.

== Religious sites ==
Othery was a chapelry of Sowy parish with its own chaplain from the 13th century. In 1515, when Sowy was divided, Othery became a separate parish with its own parish church and vicar. The church of St Michael was dedicated before 1203. The church, perpendicular in style, was remodelled in the 15th century, and partly rebuilt after 1844. Its typical Somerset tower was restored in 1849 and in 1853, when pinnacles and niches were built; sculptures of heads and angels were added in the following years. There are five bells in the tower; the oldest dates to the 1650s and was made by Robert Austen. The other bells date from between 1692 and 1815. Roundels of medieval glass, originally from Glastonbury Abbey and depicting the heads of three doctors of the church, have been preserved. Stained glass by Hardman, Bell, and Holland of Warwick was installed in the 1850s in the chancel, vestry, and north transept. The church houses a memorial to the three Chard brothers, who included Colonel John Chard, V.C. (d. 1897), who led the defence of Rorke's Drift, South Africa, and whose father lived at Pathe. It has been designated by English Heritage as a Grade I listed building.

The church registers go back to 1560, but the oldest register appears to be a rather poor late 17th-century copy of the original, "crudely arranged in alphabetical order of Christian names and with a gap from K-Q."

The Othery Cope, found under the mediaeval pulpit at the time of the Victorian renovations, is an extremely rare 16th-century ecclesiastical robe, restored and now housed at the Glastonbury Abbey Museum.

Othery church is one of the churches dedicated to St Michael that falls on a ley line proposed by John Michell. Other connected St Michaels on the ley line include churches built at Burrow Mump and Glastonbury Tor.

The first Vicar of Othery Parish was John Colmer (1515–1522).

Reverend Andrea Harwood is current Priest in Charge. The Churchwardens as of 2021 are Mr Mervyn Winslade MBE and Mrs Maragret Harris, who are supported by the Deputy Churchwardens who are Mr Anthony Betty and Mrs Anita Winslade.
