= Holland of Warwick =

Holland of Warwick was an English stained glass manufacturing firm based in Warwick, Warwickshire and active throughout the mid-nineteenth-century. Like many Victorian stained glass producers of the time, the firm primarily produced ecclesiastical commissions.

== Works ==
- 1853 East Window of All Souls' Church, Crockenhill, Kent (1851).
