= East Brent =

Village in Somerset, England

Coordinates: 51.264°N 2.936°W

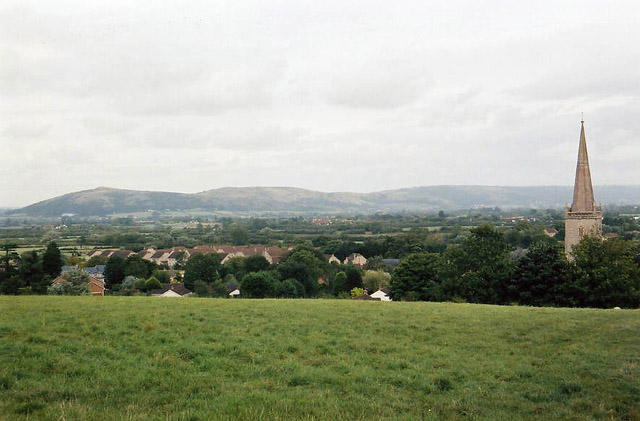
- Crook Peak and East Brent Church

- Location within Somerset
- Population: 1,404 (in 2021)
- OS grid reference: ST347520
- Civil parish: East Brent
- Unitary authority: Somerset Council
- Ceremonial county: Somerset
- Region: South West
- Country: England
- Sovereign state: United Kingdom
- Post town: Highbridge
- Postcode district: TA9
- Dialling code: 01278
- Police: Avon and Somerset
- Fire: Devon and Somerset
- Ambulance: South Western
- UK Parliament: Wells and Mendip Hills

East Brent is a village and civil parish, 5 miles (8 km) west of Axbridge, Somerset, in the south-west of England. The village lies on the north-eastern edge of Brent Knoll, a hill that dominates the surrounding level countryside, and is close to the M5 motorway. The parish includes the hamlets of Rooksbridge (where the A38 road crosses the Mark Yeo) and Edingworth, and had a population of 1,404 at the 2021 census.

== History ==
The manor formed part of the great Saxon estate of Brent given by King Ine of the West Saxons to Glastonbury Abbey in 693 and held by the monks of the abbey until the Dissolution of the monasteries in 1539. It was then granted to the Duke of Somerset and subsequently passed to the Whitmores and then the Pophams, who lived in the Grade II listed Beaconsfield House until it was sold in 2015.

East Brent was part of the hundred of Brent-cum-Wrington.

Abbot John Selwood built a mansion in the village in the 15th century, which was demolished in 1708.

In 1851 George Anthony Denison was preferred to the valuable living of East Brent, and in the same year was made Archdeacon of Taunton. He was responsible for establishing the annual Harvest Home festival in the village.

== Governance ==
The parish council has responsibility for local issues, including setting an annual precept (local rate) to cover the council's operating costs and producing annual accounts for public scrutiny. The parish council evaluates local planning applications and works with the local police, district council officers, and neighbourhood watch groups on matters of crime, security, and traffic. The parish council's role also includes initiating projects for the maintenance and repair of parish facilities, as well as consulting with the district council on the maintenance, repair, and improvement of highways, drainage, footpaths, public transport, and street cleaning. Conservation matters (including trees and listed buildings) and environmental issues are also the responsibility of the council.

For local government purposes, since 1 April 2023, the village comes under the unitary authority of Somerset Council. Prior to this, it was part of the non-metropolitan district of Sedgemoor, which was formed on 1 April 1974 under the Local Government Act 1972, having previously been part of Axbridge Rural District.

It is also part of the Wells and Mendip Hills constituency represented in the House of Commons of the Parliament of the United Kingdom. It elects one Member of Parliament (MP) by the first past the post system of election, and was part of the South West England constituency of the European Parliament prior to Britain leaving the European Union in January 2020, which elected seven MEPs using the d'Hondt method of party-list proportional representation.

== Church and chapel ==
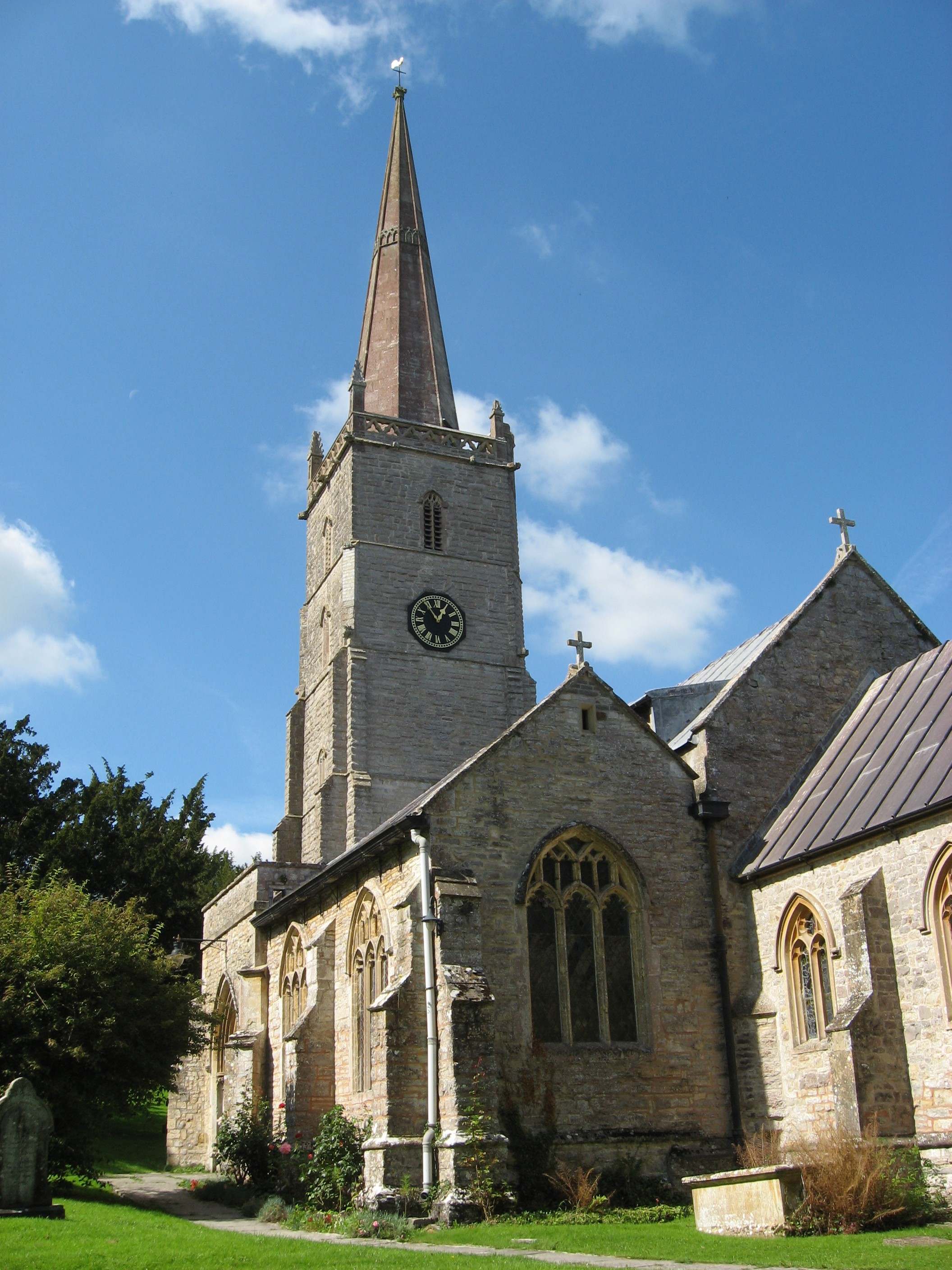
Church of St Mary the Blesséd Virgin

The parish Church of St Mary the Blesséd Virgin was built in the 15th century and was restored in the 19th century with a chancel by William Butterfield. It is a Grade I listed building. The church has a 15th-century eagle lectern and pulpit from 1634.

Charles Fane de Salis was the vicar in the late 19th century, before becoming Suffragan Bishop of Taunton.

A Baptist chapel was erected in 1852 and last used for worship in 1955 before being converted into a private house.
