= Middlezoy =

Village in Somerset, England

Coordinates: 51.088°N 2.894°W

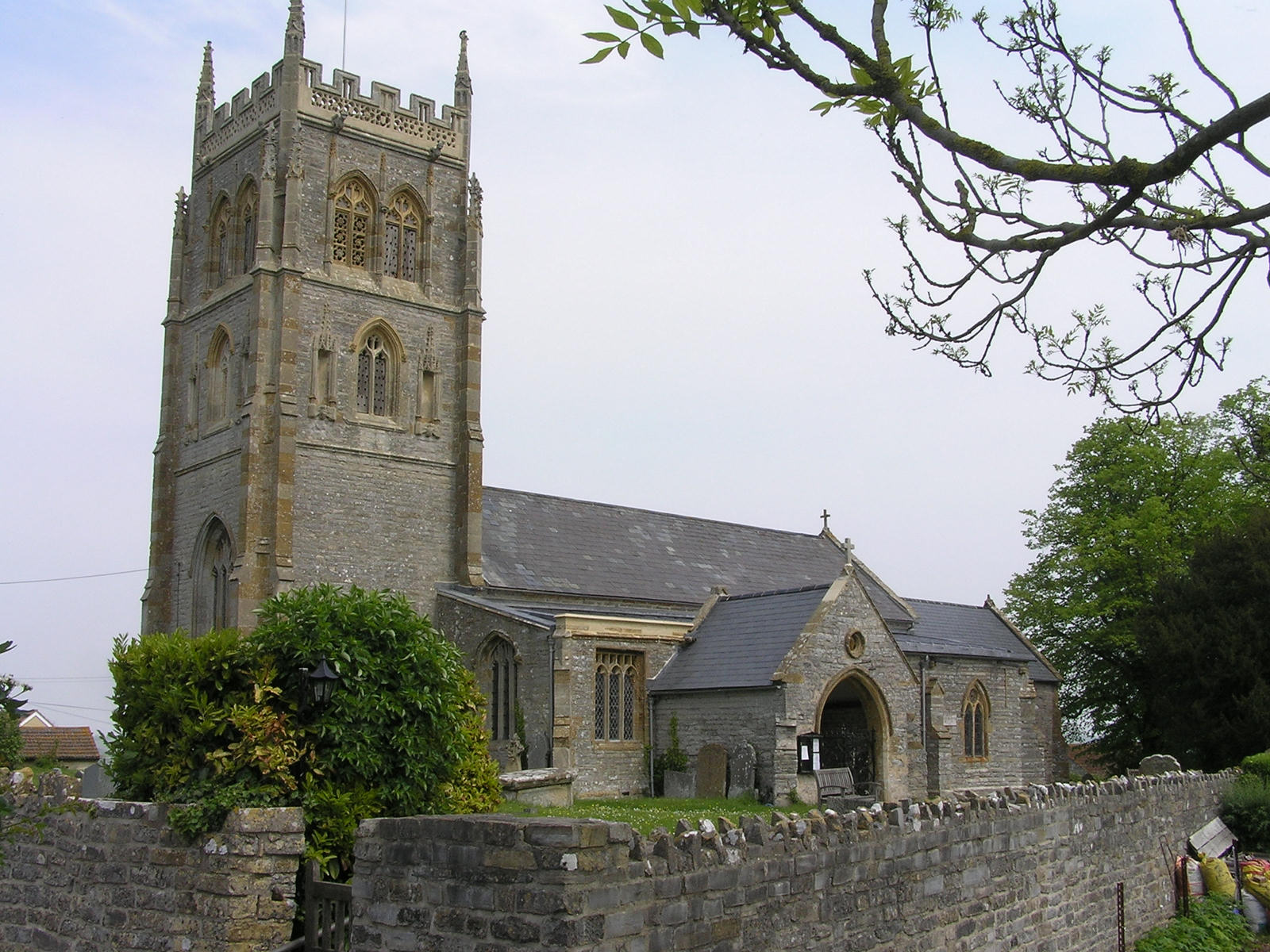
- Church of the Holy Cross

- Location within Somerset
- Population: 725 (2011)
- OS grid reference: ST375325
- Unitary authority: Somerset Council
- Ceremonial county: Somerset
- Region: South West
- Country: England
- Sovereign state: United Kingdom
- Post town: BRIDGWATER
- Postcode district: TA7
- Dialling code: 01823
- Police: Avon and Somerset
- Fire: Devon and Somerset
- Ambulance: South Western
- UK Parliament: Bridgwater

Middlezoy is a village and civil parish on the Somerset Levels in Somerset, England. Situated between the two other villages of Westonzoyland and Othery and is about six miles from the town of Bridgwater which is on the tidal river Parret.

== History ==
The name Middlezoy meaning the middle stream island, derives from Sowi, the name of Glastonbury Abbey's major estate, sow, a British river name from a root meaning flowing. The extra i is derived from the Saxon ig for island.

The parish of Middlezoy was part of the Whitley Hundred.

In 1800 1,100 acres of common land were enclosed as a result of the Inclosure Acts.

In 2006 the village shop closed and a grant was obtained for the erection of a new modular structure to house a community shop and post office.

In 2018 an unlicensed aerodrome business named Middlezoy Aerodrome was started on the south side of the old RAF Westonzoyland Airfield with a grass strip, hangar and a Nissen hut. A Meteor T.7 gate guard can be seen from the A372 main road.

== Governance ==
The parish council has responsibility for local issues, including setting an annual precept (local rate) to cover the council's operating costs and producing annual accounts for public scrutiny. The parish council evaluates local planning applications and works with the local police, district council officers, and neighbourhood watch groups on matters of crime, security, and traffic. The parish council's role also includes initiating projects for the maintenance and repair of parish facilities, as well as consulting with the district council on the maintenance, repair, and improvement of highways, drainage, footpaths, public transport, and street cleaning. Conservation matters (including trees and listed buildings) and environmental issues are also the responsibility of the council.

For local government purposes, since 1 April 2023, the village comes under the unitary authority of Somerset Council. Prior to this, it was part of the non-metropolitan district of Sedgemoor, which was formed on 1 April 1974 under the Local Government Act 1972, having previously been part of Bridgwater Rural District.

It is also part of a county constituency represented in the House of Commons of the Parliament of the United Kingdom. It elects one Member of Parliament (MP) by the first past the post system of election.

== Geography ==
Just to the north of the village is the Greylake Site of Special Scientific Interest, which consists of 20 low-lying fields in the north west corner of King's Sedgemoor, and includes the Royal Society for the Protection of Birds Greylake nature reserve. This location is the type section for the Pleistocene Burtle Beds, as it is probably the most complete Burtle Beds sequence in Somerset. It demonstrates a sequence of fluvial (or possibly glacial) gravels, marine intertidal silts and marine subtidal. Rich molluscan, ostracod and foraminifer assemblages and a mammalian fauna, including Red Deer (Cervus elephus), Aurochs (Bos primigenius) and Fallow Deer (Dama cf dama) have been recorded.

== Religious sites ==
Holy Cross church Middlezoy dates from the 13th century. It has a three-stage tower similar to that at Lyng and has been designated by English Heritage as a grade I listed building. William of Bitton II was the rector by 20 April 1263.
