= Church of the Blessed Virgin Mary, Shapwick =

Church in Somerset, England

Church of the Blessed Virgin Mary
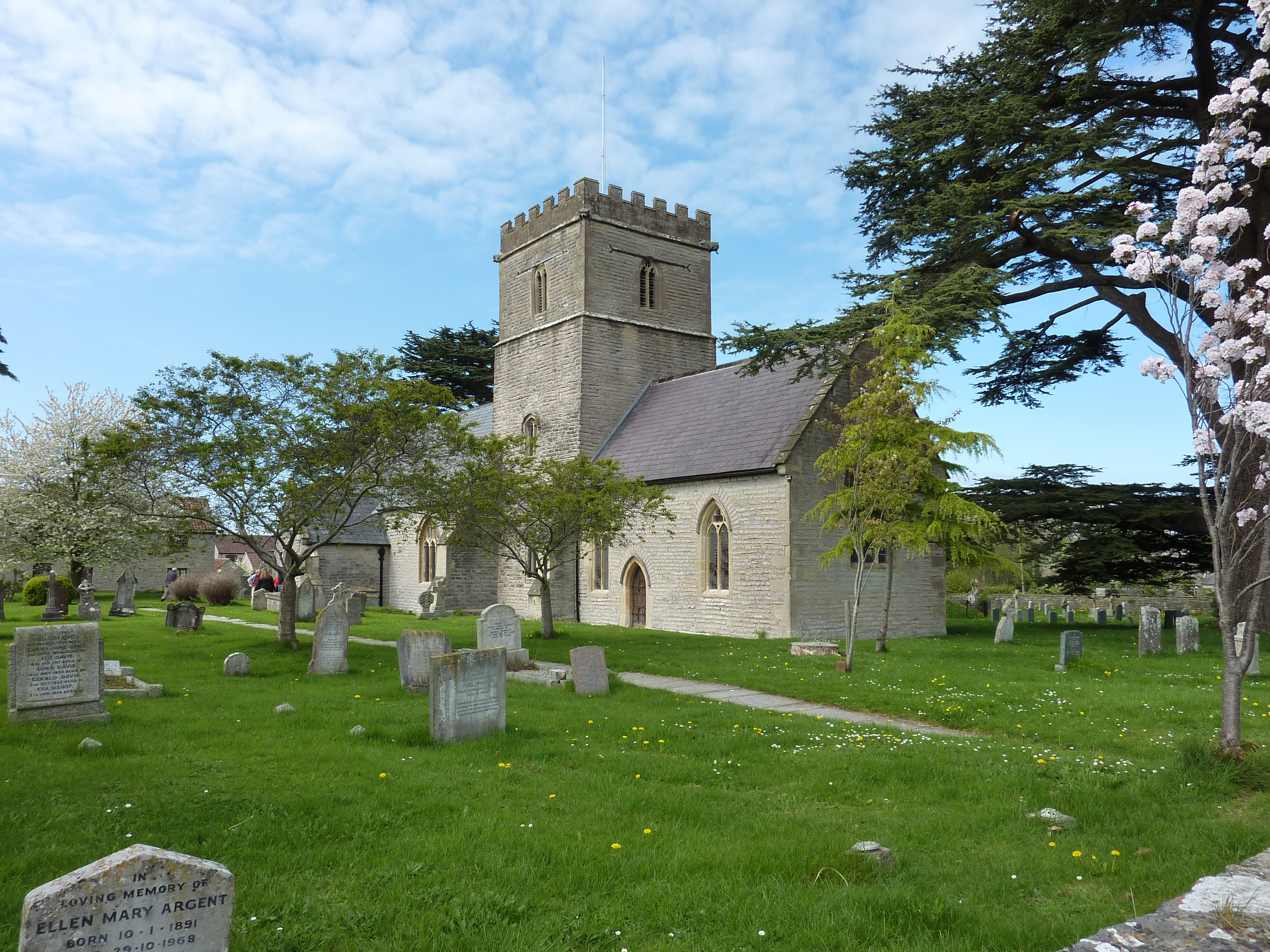

- Location within Somerset
- 51.1405°N 2.8337°W
- Location: Shapwick, Somerset, England

Listed Building – Grade II*
- Official name: Church of the Blessed Virgin Mary
- Designated: 29 March 1963
- Reference no.: 1058962

The Church of the Blessed Virgin Mary in Shapwick within the English county of Somerset was consecrated in 1331. It is a Grade II* listed building.

== History ==
The building was constructed in the early 14th century and consecrated in 1331. It replaced an earlier building which existed in 1168 but may go back to a charter of 971. The new building had the same dimensions as the previous church. The church was under the patronage of Glastonbury Abbey.

Its central two-stage tower is a style that was at least a century out of date when it was built in the 15th century as part of wider alterations to the church. Further restoration was undertaken in 1861 by George Gilbert Scott.

The parish is part of the Polden Wheel benefice within the Diocese of Bath and Wells.

== Architecture ==
The church consists of a nave with a vestry, chancel and south porch. The tower has six bells.

Parts of the current building including the piscina and font were moved from an earlier church in fields outside the village.

The church contains memorials to the Bull family, including Henry Bull, who were Lord of the manor and lived at Shapwick Manor.
