= Henry Bull (MP) =

English lawyer and politician

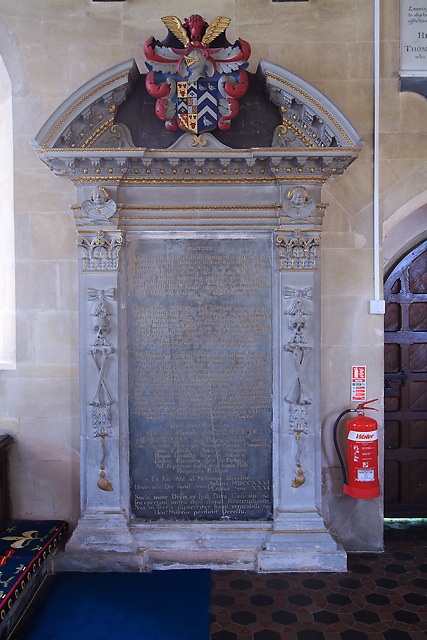
Monument to Henry Bull in the Church of the Blessed Virgin Mary in Shapwick

Henry Bull (1630 – 28 January 1692) was an English lawyer and politician who sat in the House of Commons at various times between 1660 and 1692.

Bull was the eldest surviving son of William Bull, barrister of Shapwick, Somerset and his wife Jane Southworth, daughter of Henry Southworth, merchant of London and Wells. He was baptised on 8 October 1630. He was admitted at Inner Temple in 1651 and called to the bar in 1658. In April 1660, Bull was elected Member of Parliament for Wells in the Convention Parliament. He succeeded his father in 1676 and was appointed High Sheriff of Somerset for 1683–84.

He was elected MP for Milborne Port for the Second Exclusion Parliament in 1679 and again in 1681 and 1685. In 1689 he was elected MP for Bridgwater and was re-elected for the seat in 1690.

Bull died suddenly at the age of about 61 and was buried at Shapwick.

Bull married Elizabeth Hunt, daughter of Robert Hunt of Compton Pauncefoot, Somerset on 14 April 1658 and had three sons and two daughters.

Parliament of England
Vacant Seats vacant in Rump Parliament Title last held by Ralph Hopton & Edward Rodney	Member of Parliament for Wells; 1660– 1661; With: Thomas White	Succeeded by Sir Maurice Berkeley; Lord Richard Butler
Preceded by John Hunt; William Lacy	Member of Parliament for Milborne Port; 1679–1689; With: John Hunt	Succeeded by John Hunt; Thomas Saunders
Preceded by Sir Francis Warre; Sir Halswell Tynte	Member of Parliament for Bridgwater; 1689– 1692; With: Sir Francis Warre	Succeeded by Robert Balch; Sir Francis Warre
