= Gerald Trump =

English cricketer (born 1937)

Personal information
- Full name: Gerald Trump
- Born: 10 August 1937 (age 89); Taunton, Somerset, England
- Batting: Right-handed
- Bowling: Right-arm medium
- Relatives: Harvey Trump (son); Henry Searle (grandson)

Domestic team information
- Years: Team
- 1958–1961: Devon
- 1962: Somerset 2nd XI
- 1963–1973: Devon
- 1975–1977: Somerset 2nd XI

Gerald Trump (born 10 August 1937) is an English cricketer, schoolmaster and the founder, and headmaster, of Edington School (later Shapwick School). He was a medium pace seam bowler who generally opened the bowling. He played for Devon and Somerset second XI between 1958 and 1977. He was captain of Devon between 1970 and 1972.

== Personal life and teaching ==
Trump was born in Taunton. He attended Priory Secondary Modern in Taunton, before going on to study physical education at St Luke's College, Exeter. After graduating from college, Trump returned to Priory as a P.E. teacher. He married Jacqueline Betty at St Andrew's Church, Taunton on Easter Monday in April 1960. Trump's son, Harvey also played cricket for Somerset, appearing in over 200 top level matches between 1988 and 1997.

After leaving Priory School, Trump worked as assistant master of remedial English at Millfield. In 1972, the head of Millfield, Colin Atkinson, himself a former Somerset cricketer, was instrumental in the founding of Chalice School in Glastonbury, which specialised in teaching students with dyslexia; Trump became the new school's headmaster. When Chalice closed two years later, Trump established Edington School in Burtle, in order to continue working with dyslexic students.

== Cricket career ==
Trump joined Taunton Cricket Club as a 14 year old, and represented Somerset Schools and Somerset Colts as a junior. In 1957 he attended final trials for the Royal Air Force team, having been a member of the Technical Training Command team that won the inter-command championship. In 1958, Somerset allowed him to register to play for Devon. He made his Minor Counties Championship debut for them against Cornwall that May, and was awarded his cap by the county later in the season.

Trump played one season for Somerset second XI in 1962 in the Minor Counties championship, scoring 55 runs at 9.16, and taking 11 wickets at 20.45 before returning to play for Devon, where he later captained the side between 1970 and 1972. In 1968 he had joined Morlands Cricket Club in Glastonbury, near to where he was working at Millfield School. In 1970, he was elected as the Southern and Western Minor Counties representative on the Minor Counties selection committee. Between 1975 and 1977, he again played for Somerset second XI.

Trump played 124 times for Devon in the Minor Counties Championship. He finished his career with 324 wickets at an average of 22.32, standing sixth in the all-time list of leading wicket-takers for Devon as of the start of the 2021 season, with 11 five wicket hauls and two ten wicket matches. As a batsman, he scored 1,504 runs at an average of 12.12.

Trump made a single List A appearance for Devon, in the 1969 Gillette Cup against Hertfordshire. Batting in the lower order, Trump scored a single run in the match, and took bowling figures of 1-42 from twelve overs.
