= Cossington, Somerset =

Village in Somerset, England

Coordinates: 51.160°N 2.924°W

Cossington
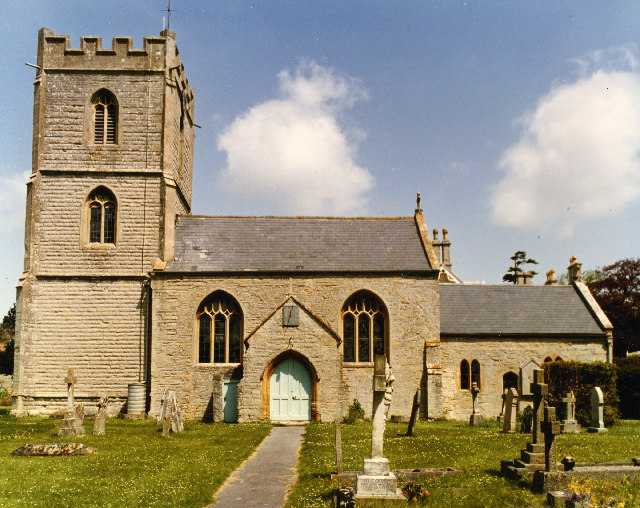
- St Mary's Church, Cossington

- Location within Somerset
- Population: 564 (2011)
- OS grid reference: ST355405
- Unitary authority: Somerset Council
- Ceremonial county: Somerset
- Region: South West
- Country: England
- Sovereign state: United Kingdom
- Post town: BRIDGWATER
- Postcode district: TA7
- Dialling code: 01278
- Police: Avon and Somerset
- Fire: Devon and Somerset
- Ambulance: South Western
- UK Parliament: Bridgwater

Cossington is a village and civil parish close to Woolavington and 5 miles (8 km) north of Bridgwater, in Somerset, England. The village lies on the north side of the Polden Hills. Its population in 2021 was 640.

== History ==
The Domesday book states that Cossington was a settlement of 22 households. It was part of the ancient Polden estate of Glastonbury Abbey. The abbey retained an interest as chief lord of the manor until 1508. The parish of Cossington was part of the Whitley Hundred.

Cossington railway station was a station on the Bridgwater branch of the Somerset and Dorset Joint Railway, which opened in 1890 and closed in 1952.

Cossington had a Penny Post service under Bridgwater in 1830. The post office closed in March 2007.

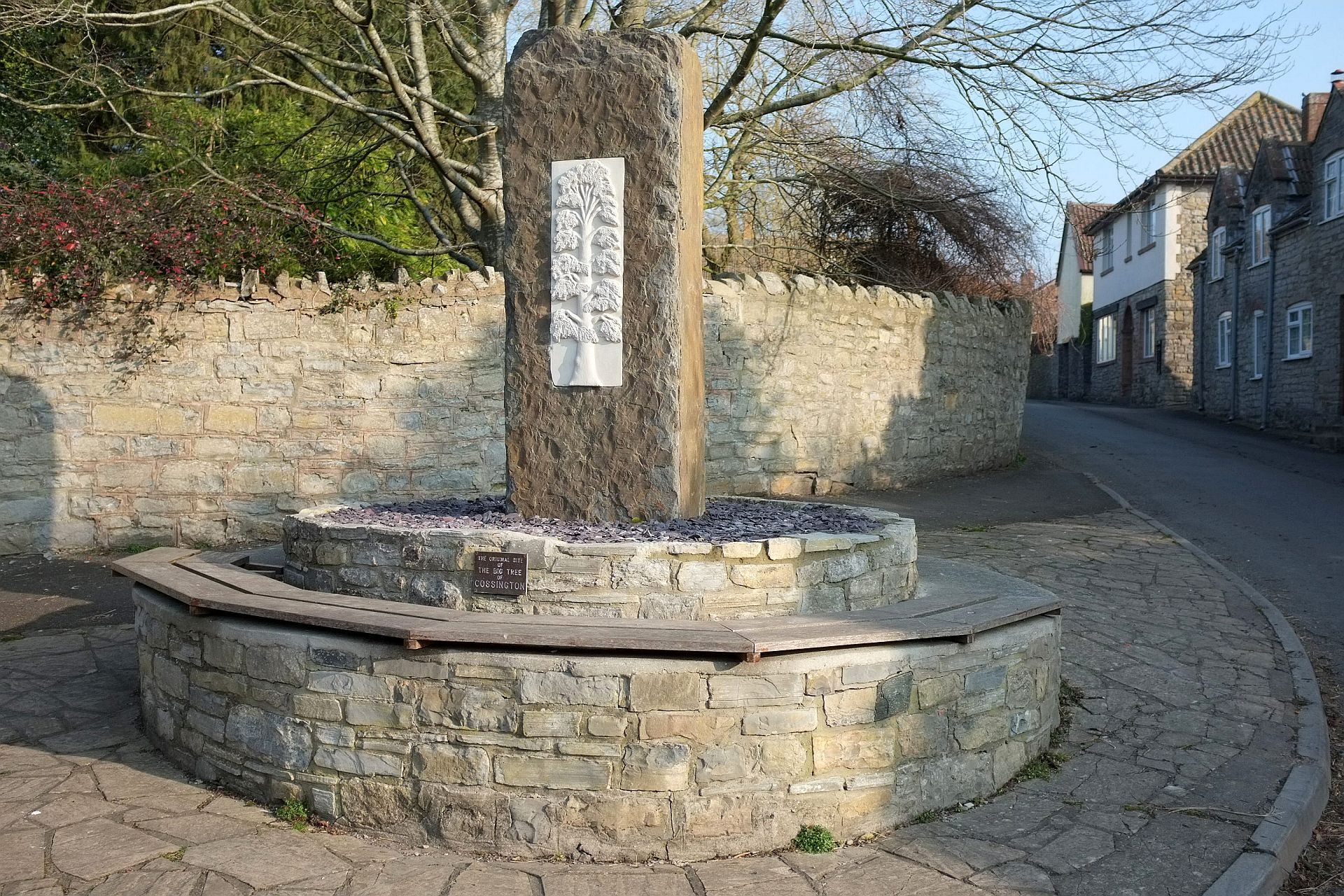
The Big Tree memorial stone

== Governance ==
The parish council has responsibility for local issues, including setting an annual precept (local rate) to cover the council's operating costs and producing annual accounts for public scrutiny. The parish council evaluates local planning applications and works with the local police, district council officers, and neighbourhood watch groups on matters of crime, security, and traffic. The parish council's role also includes initiating projects for the maintenance and repair of parish facilities, as well as consulting with the district council on the maintenance, repair, and improvement of highways, drainage, footpaths, public transport, and street cleaning. Conservation matters (including trees and listed buildings) and environmental issues are also the responsibility of the council.

For local government purposes, since 1 April 2023, the village comes under the unitary authority of Somerset Council. Prior to this, it was part of the non-metropolitan district of Sedgemoor, which was formed on 1 April 1974 under the Local Government Act 1972, having previously been part of Bridgwater Rural District.

It is also part of the Bridgwater county constituency represented in the House of Commons of the Parliament of the United Kingdom. It elects one Member of Parliament (MP) by the first past the post system of election, and was part of the South West England constituency of the European Parliament prior to Britain leaving the European Union in January 2020, which elected seven MEPs using the d'Hondt method of party-list proportional representation.

== Religious sites ==
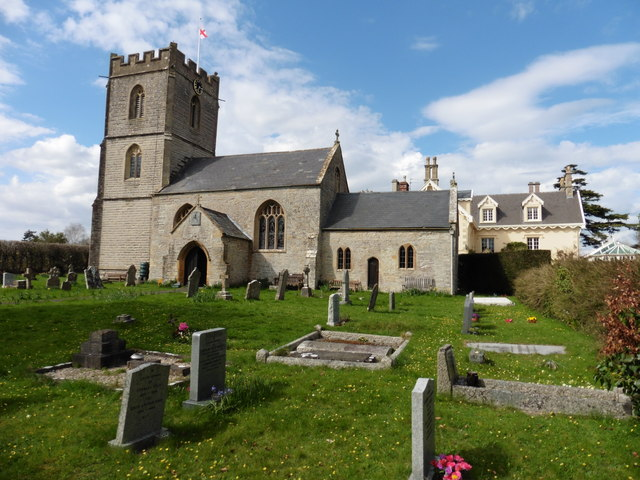
St Mary's Church, Cossington (geograph 4909062)

The church is dedicated to St Mary and dates from the 13th century; it underwent extensive renovation in 1900. It has been designated by English Heritage as a Grade II* listed building.
