= Peat extraction on the Somerset Levels =

Peat mining in England

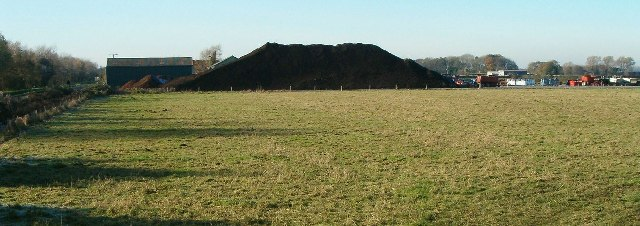
Modern peat works on the Somerset Levels, 2005

Peat has been extracted from the Somerset Levels in South West England since the area was first drained by the Romans, and continues in the 21st century on an area of less than 0.5% of the total geography. The modern system in recycling land back to farm use and conservation has resulted in the creation of numerous Sites of Special Scientific Interest.

== Context ==
Large areas of peat were laid down on the Somerset Levels, particularly in the River Brue Valley, during the Quaternary period after the ice sheets melted.

In June 1961, on opening a new areas for peat extraction, peat diggers found one half of a Flatbow. Carbon dated to the Neolithic period, it was given the name the Meare Heath Bow.

== History ==
=== Early ===
Peat was extracted from the Moors during Roman times, since the Levels were first drained.

After the Romans left Britain, peat extraction was undertaken by hand by the owning or tenanted farmers.

=== Victorian era ===
By the late Victorian period, the Eclipse Peat Company was the main commercial extractor of peat, operating initially across Shapwick Heath.

Extracting peat at Westhay, September 1905

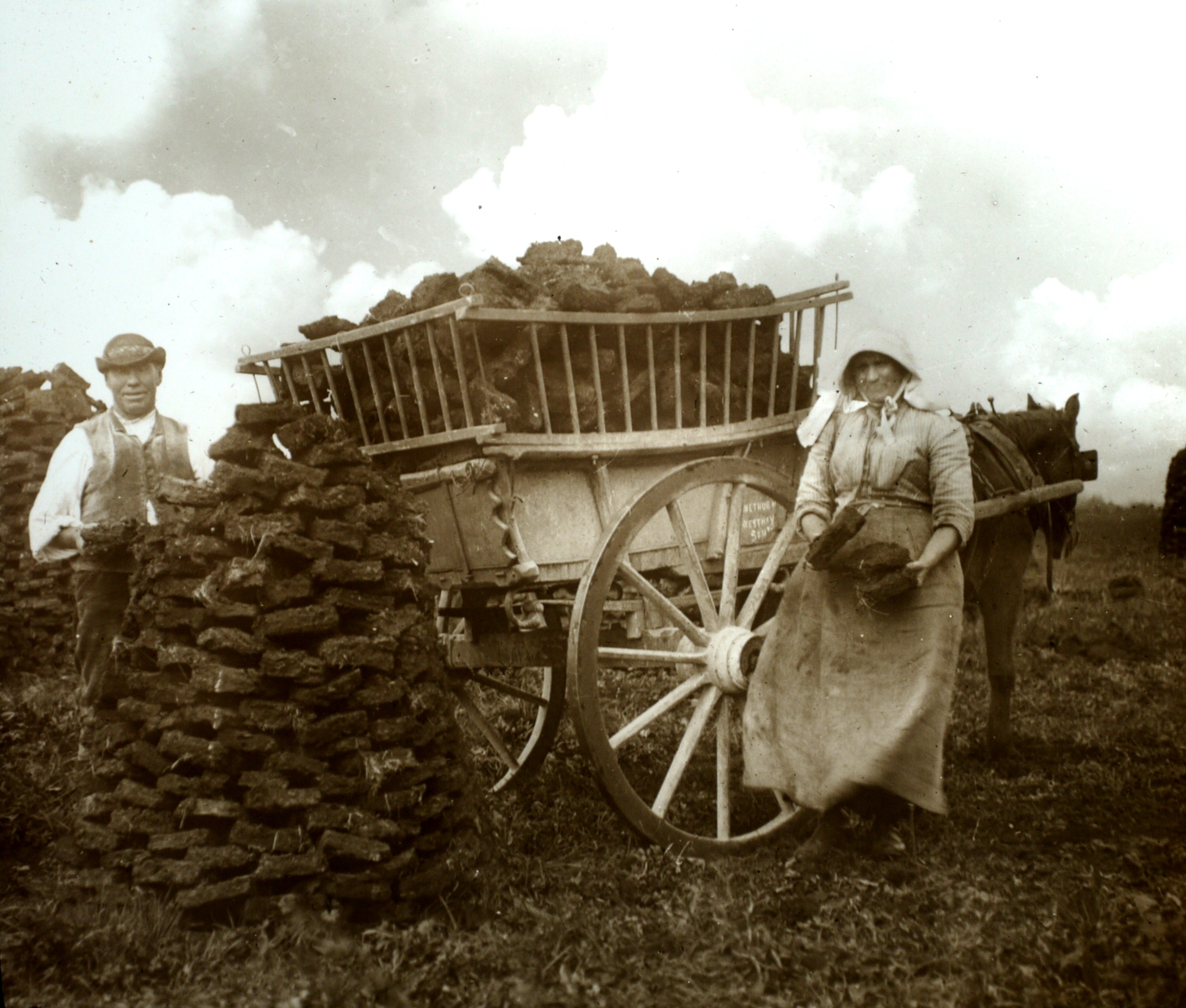
Peat gatherers

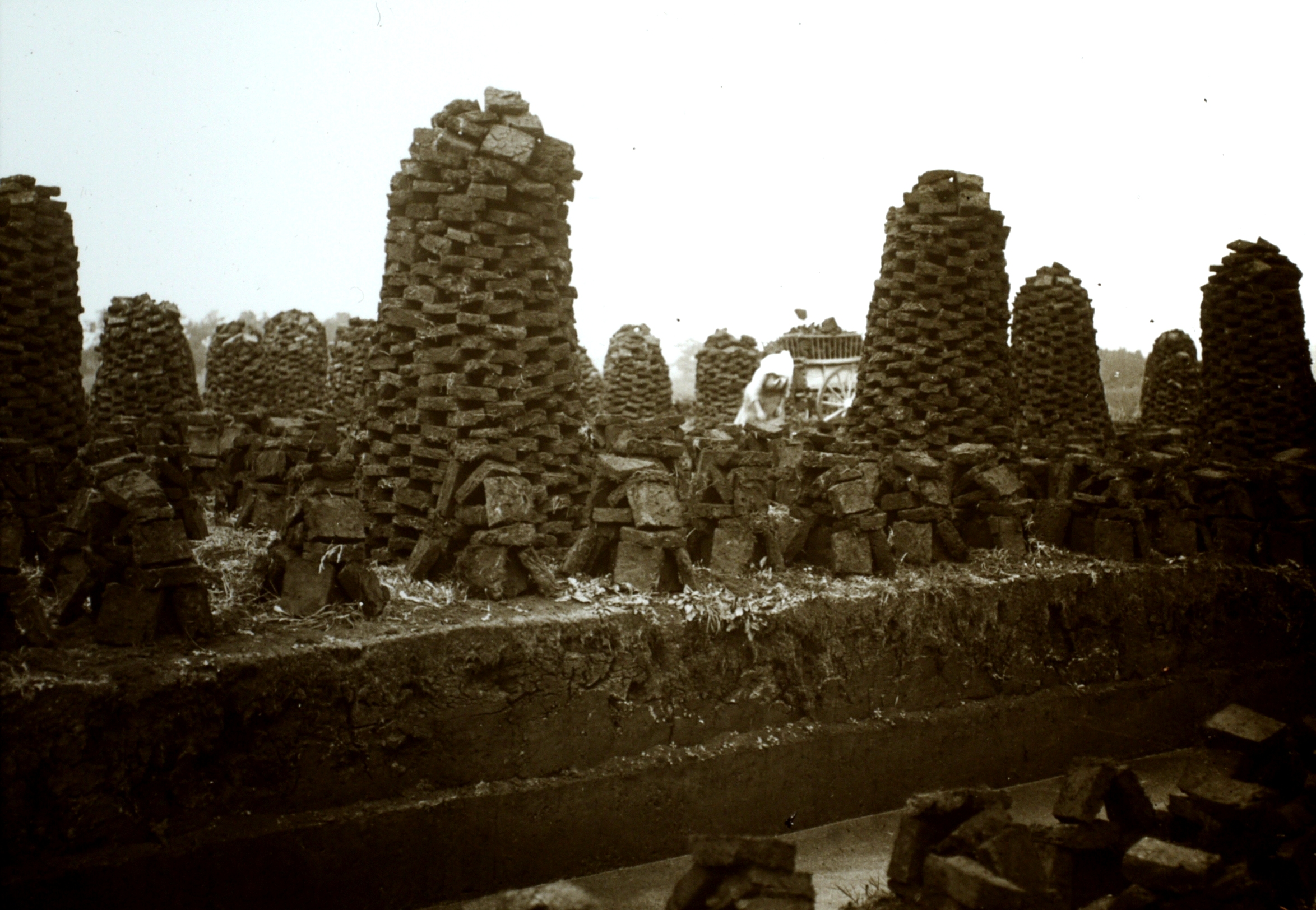
Peat stacks and cutting

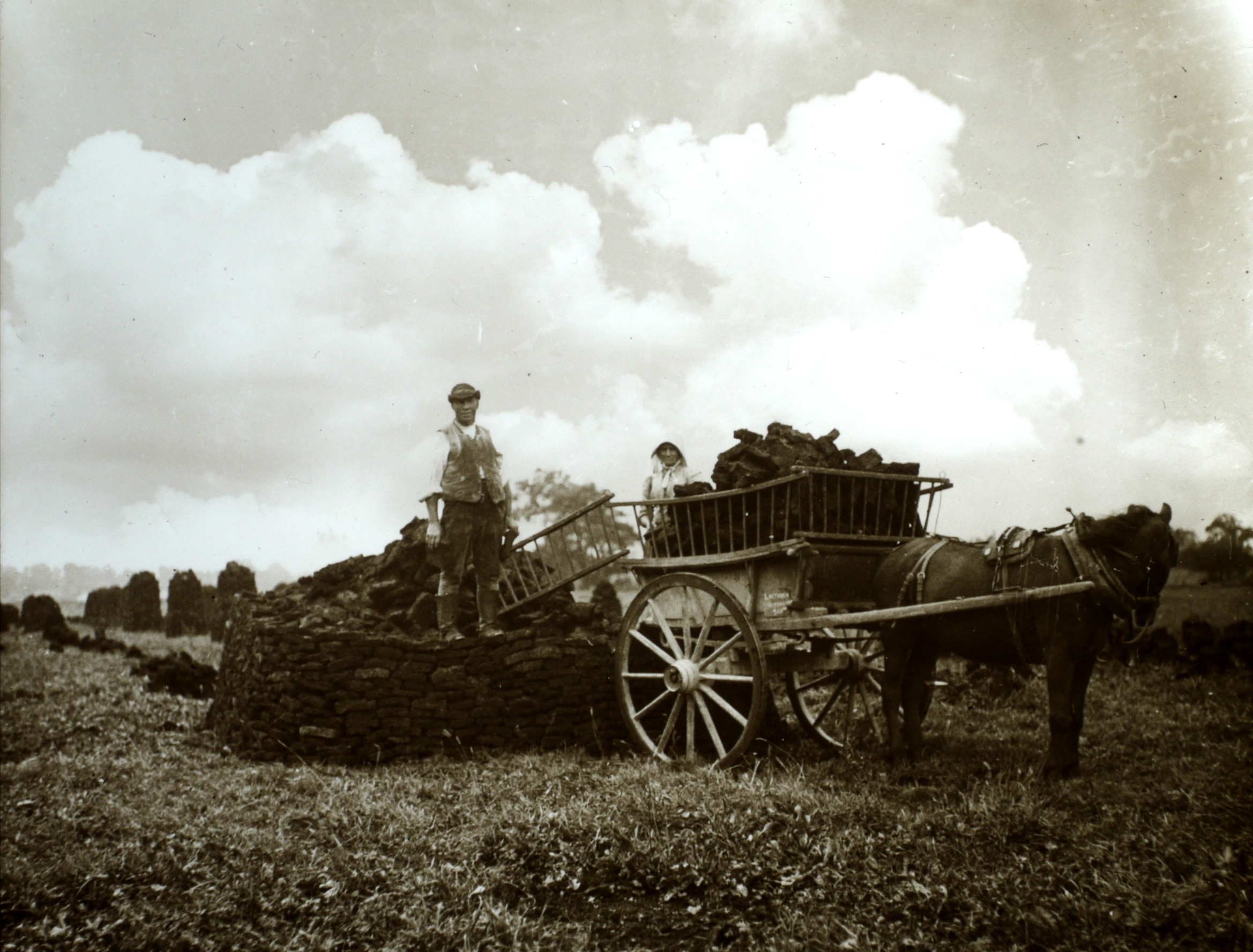
Harvesting the peat

=== 20th century ===
There was an extensive 2 ft (610 mm) narrow gauge tramway operated by the Eclipse Peat Company to take workers to remote locations and then extract heavy loads of cut peat. Developed from 1922, it was initially operated by horses. The tramway had its mainworks at the Broomfield Works, where from the 1930s the company constructed its own locomotives from kits supplied by R.A. Listers of Dursley, based around either Lister diesel or J.A.P. petrol engines. The railway crossed both the Glastonbury Canal and the former Somerset Central Railway from Burnham-on-Sea to Wells, near Ashcott railway station. Merged into the Somerset and Dorset Joint Railway, 1/2 mile (0.8 km) west of Ashcott existed "Alexander siding", which allowed exchange between the SD&JR and the Eclipse tramway system, and hence distribution of cut peat products across the United Kingdom. In 1949 a British Railways passenger train from Highbridge collided with an Eclipse narrow gauge diesel locomotive crossing on the level and left the track, ending up in the Glastonbury Canal. The tramway was worked for a final time in 1983, after which all transport was undertaken by road. One of the locomotives, Lister 42494, is currently preserved at Twyford Waterworks.

The introduction of plastic packaging in the 1950s allowed the peat to be packed without rotting, which led to the industrialisation of peat extraction during the 1960s to meet the demand for peat for horticulture. However, the resultant reduction in water levels put local ecosystems at risk; peat wastage in pasture fields was occurring at rates of 1–3 feet (0.3–0.8 m) per century. The need to reduce the amount of peat extracted led to mechanisation, and hence Eclipse agreed to be bought by Fisons in 1961. This was the last year that hand-cutting was used to extract peat, and since that time all cutting has been done by machine.

=== 21st century ===
Peat extraction on the Somerset Levels continued in the 2000s, although at a much reduced scale. In 2012 the Fisons Eclipse Peat Works covered 3,000 acres (1,200 ha), but only 1,100 acres (450 ha) were actually worked — less than 0.5% of the entire area of the Somerset Levels. Employing 90 people, more were employed in the summer when the peat was turned by hand to allow it to dry. 70% of production was sold in various products to domestic gardeners, while 30% was used for commercial purposes. After the company had finished working an area, it was environmentally restored, and then either resold to the original farmer, conservationists, or private buyers. The system led to the creation of a number of Sites of Special Scientific Interest, giving a haven to wildlife on the levels.

Peat workings at the start of the 21st century

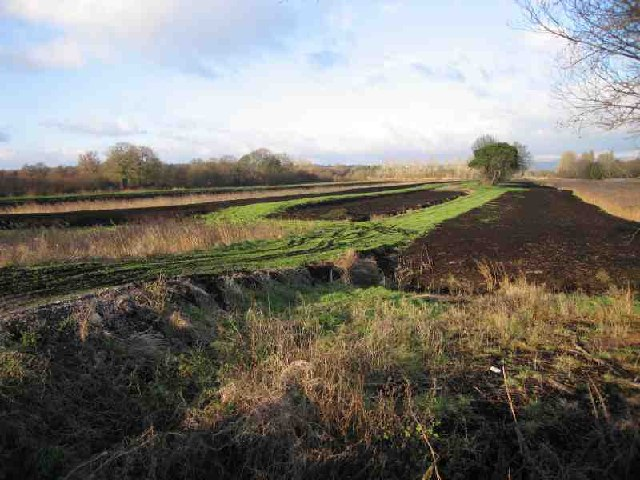
Preparing areas in the Somerset Levels for peat extraction, 2005

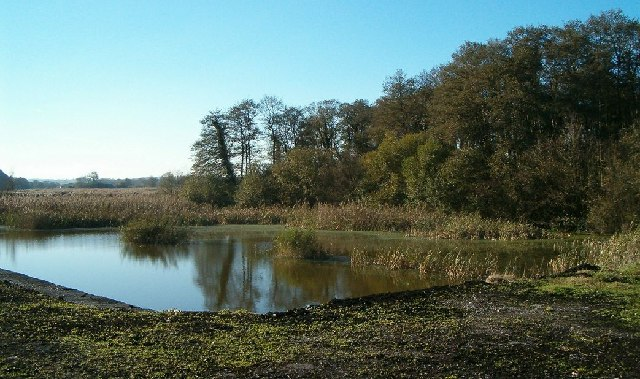
Old peat working, now allowed to flood, at Cold Harbour, 2005

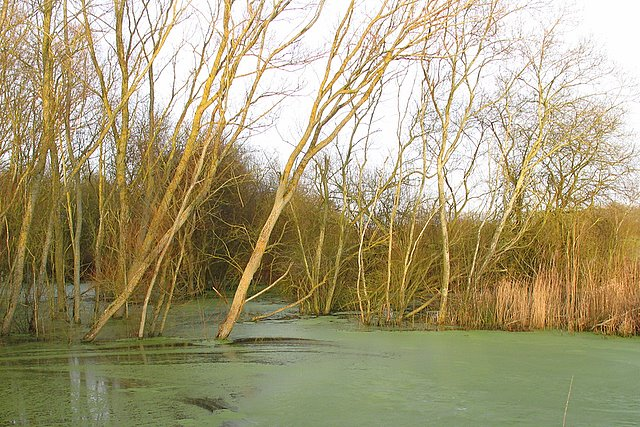
Old peat extraction areas, now flooded and "returned to nature", 2008

In 2022, Somerset Wildlife Trust issued a "position statement" on peat extraction in Somerset, calling for the practice to end immediately, and stating that "Given that the cost of peatland restoration will continue to increase until extraction ceases, it would be both illogical and an inefficient use of public funds for UK Governments to continue to invest in peatland restoration whilst permitting peat use and extraction to continue."

In 2023, the local authority, Somerset County Council, was discussing with the British Government a way to pay the peat extraction companies to cease extraction from the Somerset Levels. The council is run by the Liberal Democrats, who have promised to bring extraction to a halt. Companies still extracting peat in 2023 include Godwins, who were at that time making their compost with around 30% peat, and stating that they intended to make their products entirely peat-free. The council has stated that all extraction licences are due to expire "by the end of 2042".

Peat production in 2023

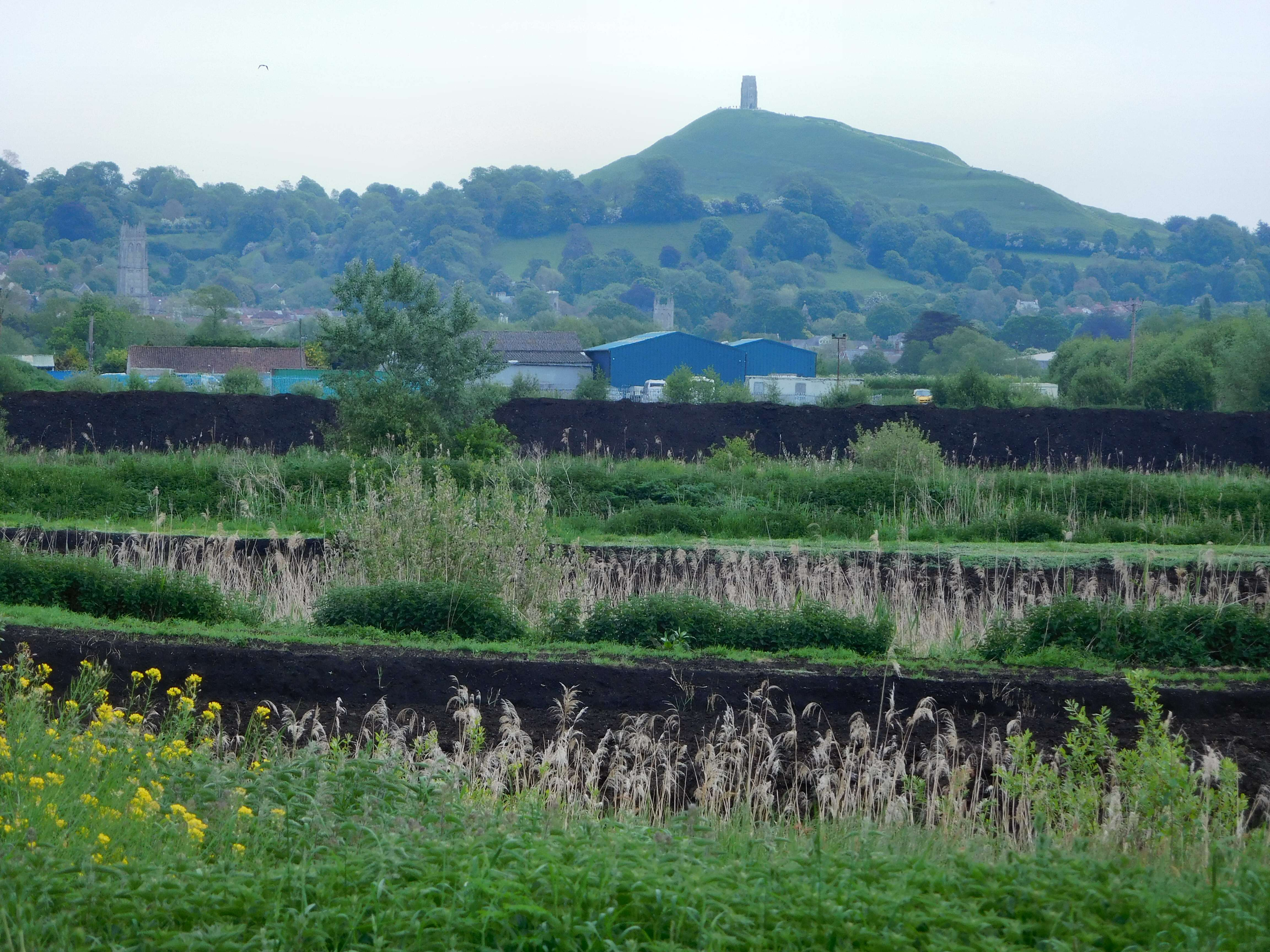
Peat extraction areas near Glastonbury

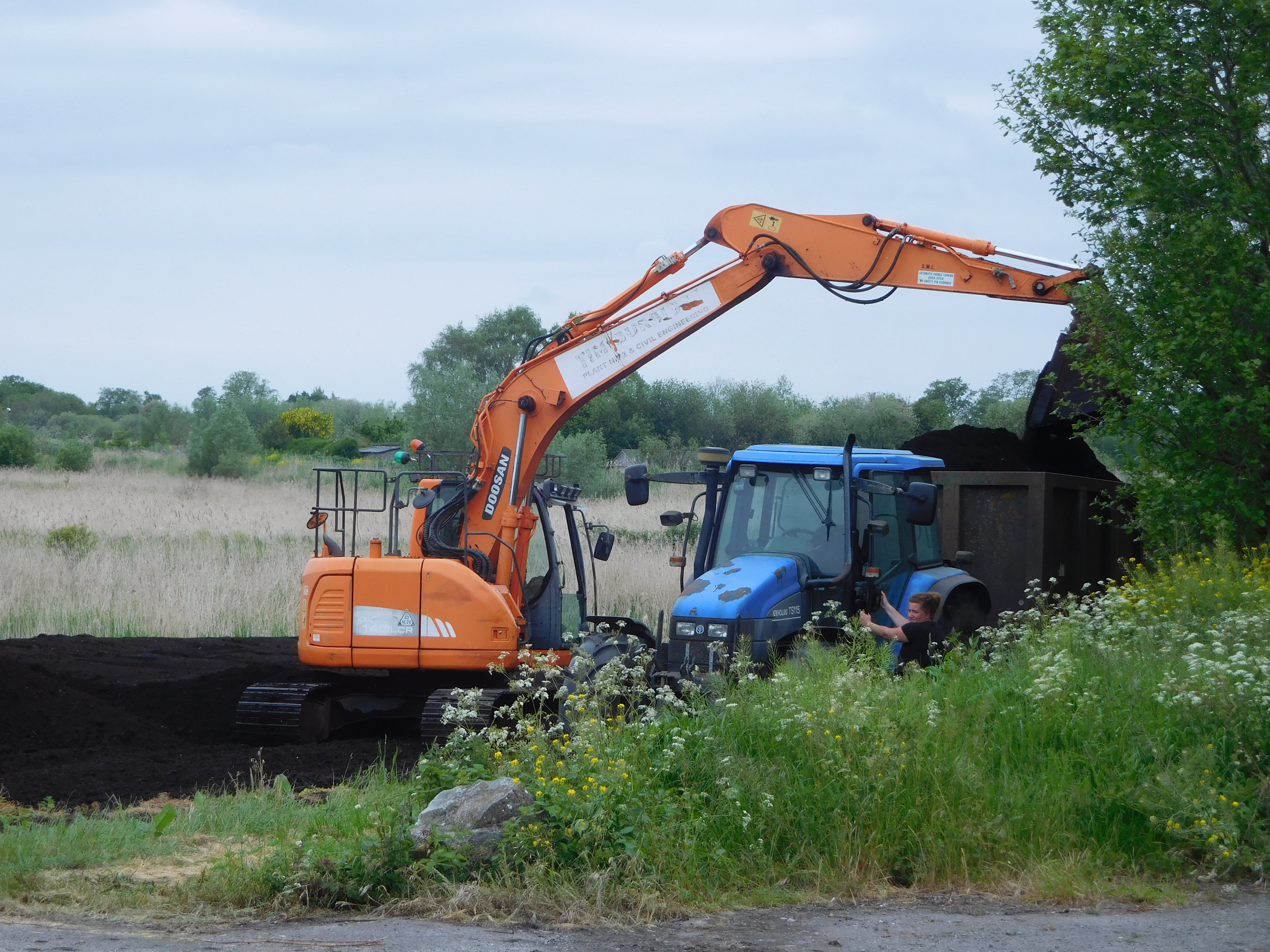
Peat extraction in strip next to a reed bed

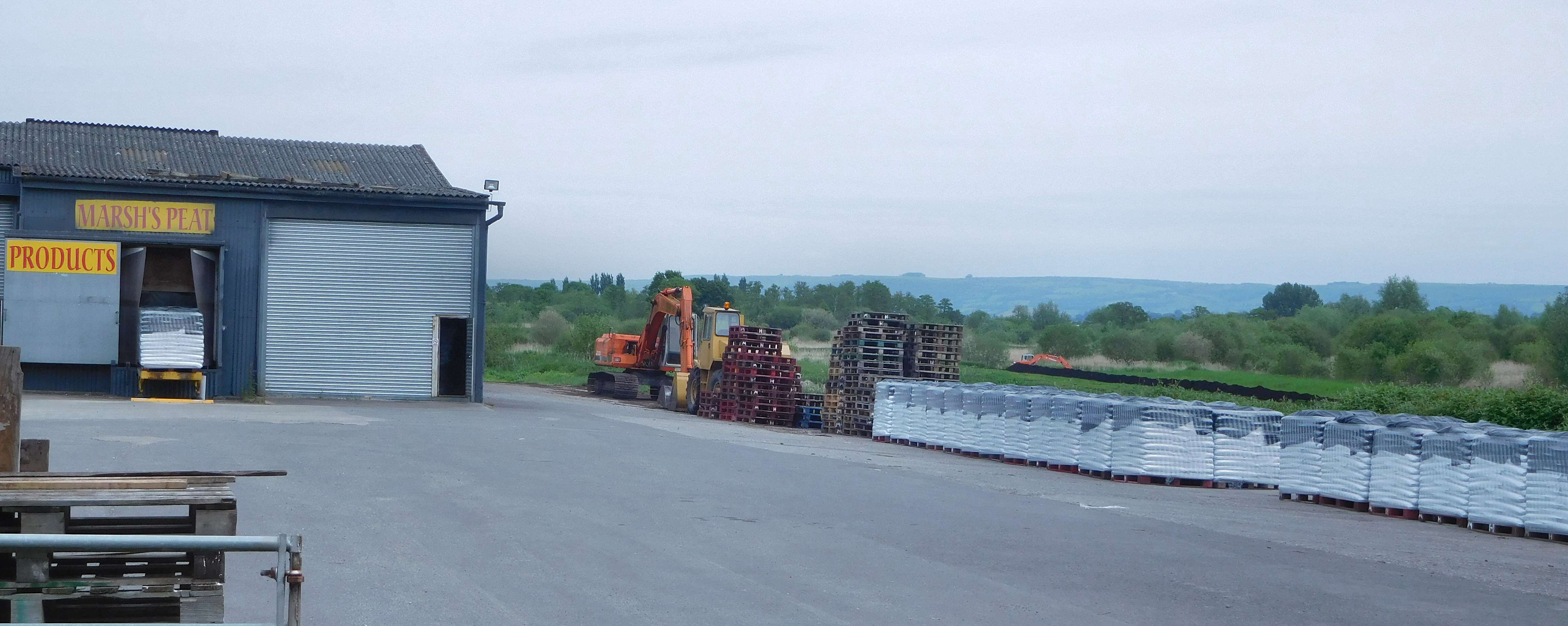
Factory with bagged peat, extraction in the background

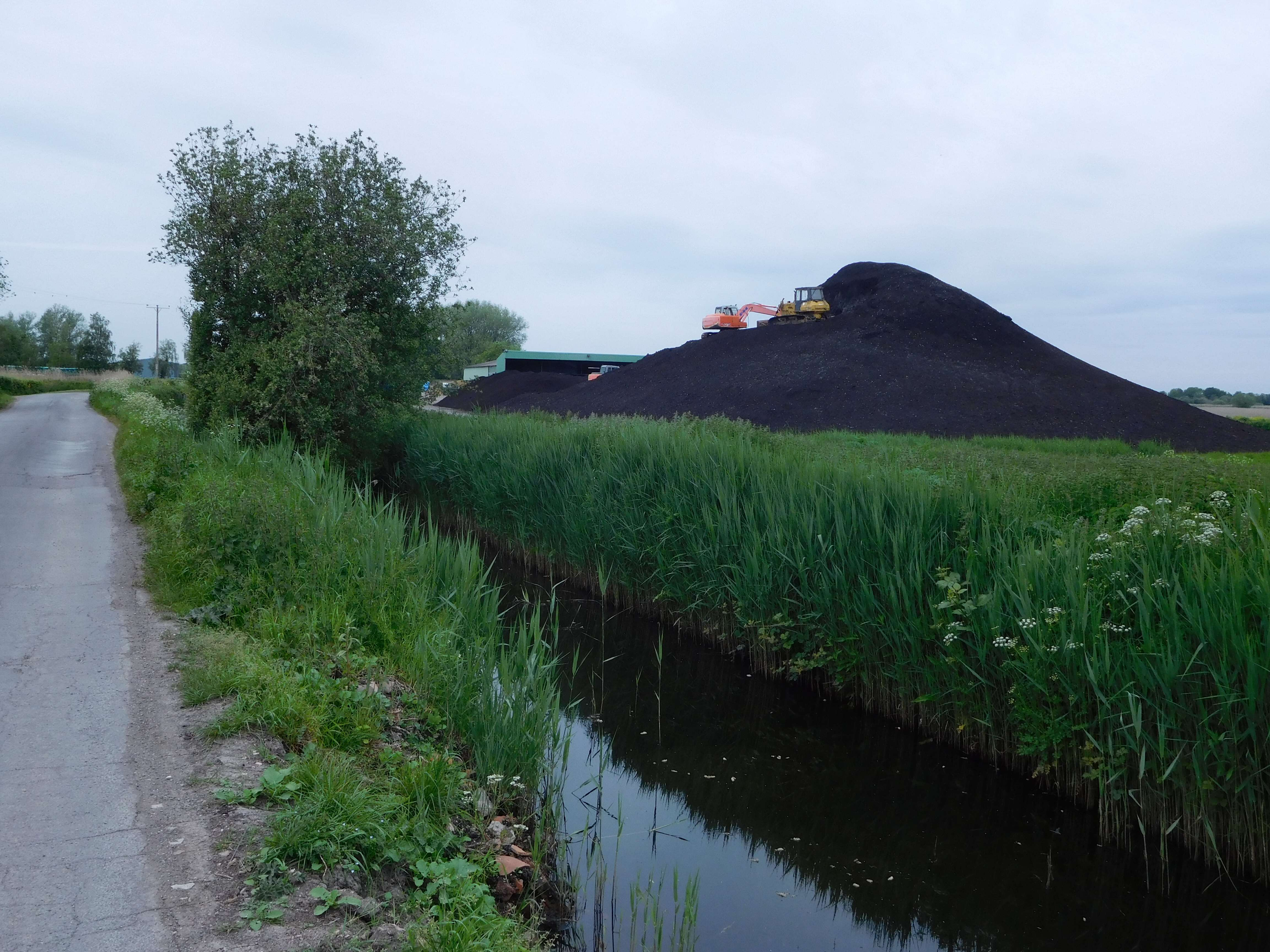
Pile of extracted peat with excavators
