= Cossington railway station =

Railway station in Somerset, England

Cossington
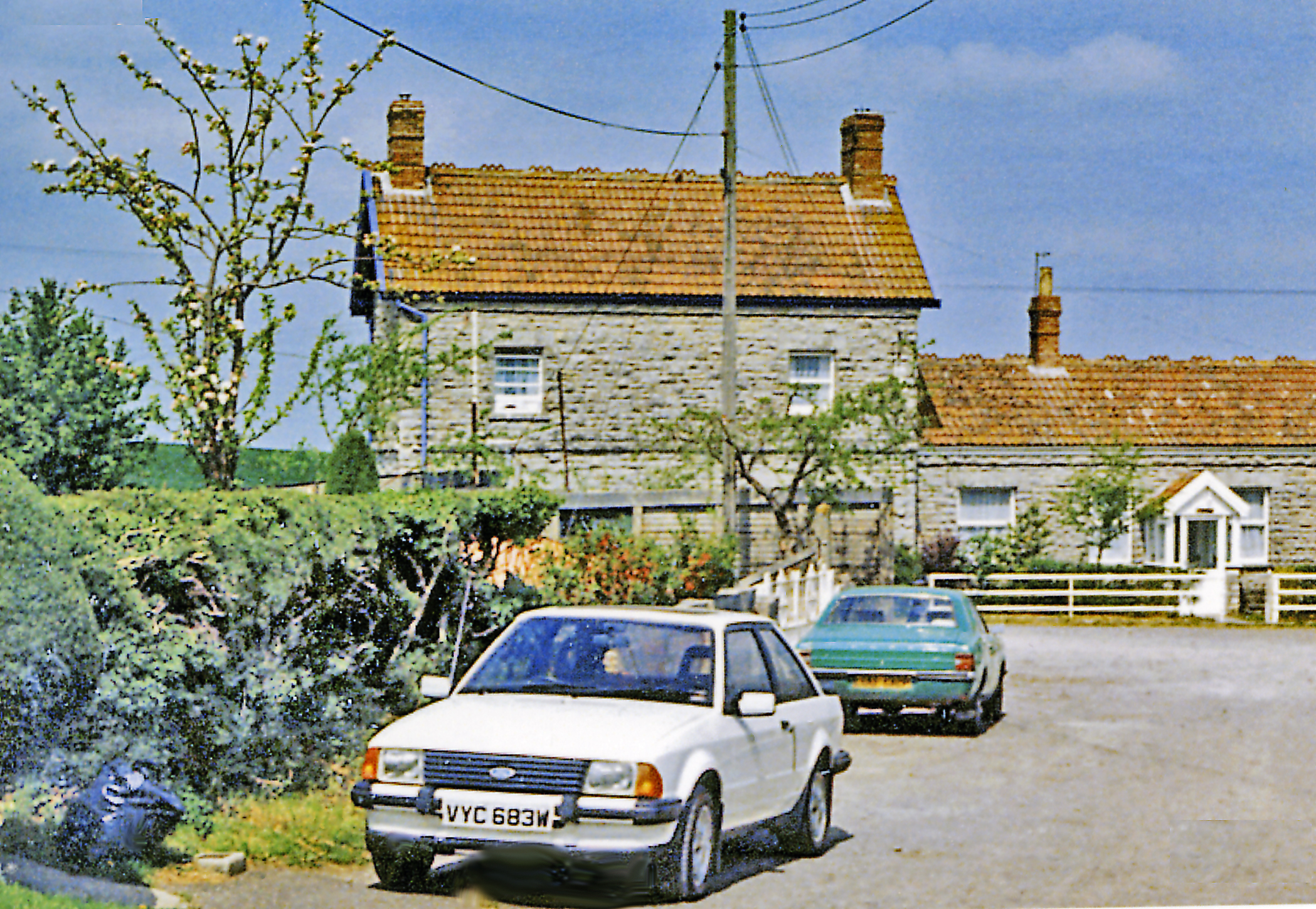
- Station building (1987)

General information
- Location: Cossington, Somerset; England
- Coordinates: 51.1627°N 2.9201°W
- Grid reference: ST357408
- Platforms: 1

Other information
- Status: Disused

History
- Original company: Bridgwater Railway
- Pre-grouping: Bridgwater Railway
- Post-grouping: Somerset and Dorset Joint Railway

Key dates
- 21 July 1890: Opened
- 1 December 1952: Closed
Location

Cossington railway station was a station at Cossington on the Bridgwater branch of the Somerset and Dorset Joint Railway, built to link the line at Edington with Bridgwater.

Opened on 21 July 1890 by the Bridgwater Railway Company, it was located to the north of the village, and consisted of a single platform with a stone building and a siding. This was controlled from a ground frame, the hut from which is now on the East Somerset Railway.

The station closed when the service was withdrawn on 1 December 1952. Station Road leads to the former station site.

Preceding station	Disused railways	Following station
Edington Jn. Line and station closed	Somerset & Dorset Joint Railway; Bridgwater Railway	Bawdrip Halt; Line and station closed
