= Church of St Mary, Cossington =

Church in Somerset, England

Church of St Mary
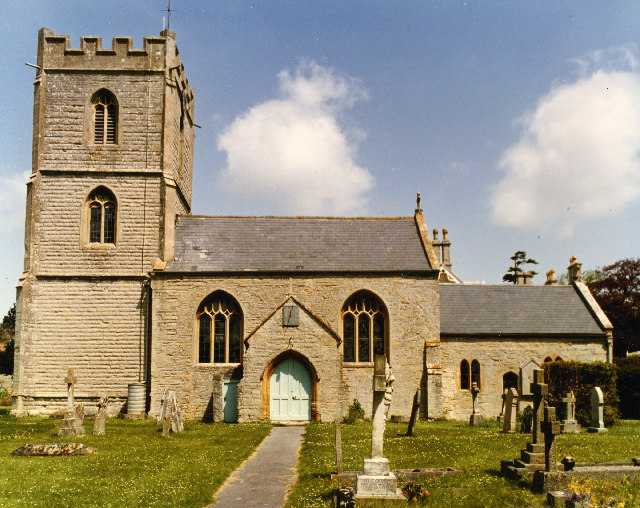

- Location within Somerset
- 51.1581°N 2.9215°W
- Location: Cossington, Somerset, England

Listed Building – Grade II*
- Official name: Church of St Mary
- Designated: 29 March 1963
- Reference no.: 1344698

The Anglican Church of St Mary in Cossington within the English county of Somerset was built in the 13th century. It is a Grade II* listed building.

== History ==
The church was built in the 13th century and revised in the 14th and 15th centuries. Victorian restoration was carried out in 19th century. In 1900 the west gallery was removed. The dedication to the Blessed Virgin Mary was before 1505.

The parish is part of the benefice of Woolavington with Cossington and Bawdrip within the Diocese of Bath and Wells.

== Architecture ==
The church has a nave and chancel with a south porch. The three-stage tower is supported by diagonal buttresses, and contains six bells.

== See also ==
- List of ecclesiastical parishes in the Diocese of Bath and Wells
