= Bawdrip Halt railway station =

Disused railway station in Bawdrip, Somerset

Coordinates: 51°09′11″N 2°56′33″W

Bawdrip Halt

General information
- Location: Bawdrip; England
- Platforms: 1

Other information
- Status: Disused

History
- Original company: Somerset and Dorset Joint Railway

Key dates
- 7 July 1923: Station opened as Bawdrip Halt
- 1 December 1952: Station closed
Location

Bawdrip Halt was a railway station at Bawdrip on the Bridgwater branch of the Somerset and Dorset Joint Railway.

Although the line had opened in 1890, station facilities at Bawdrip were not provided until 7 July 1923, after petitioning by local people. The new halt was surprisingly popular, with 2,185 passengers using it between 7 July and 29 September 1923.

It consisted of a single concrete platform 140 feet long; a waiting shelter was provided during 1924.

The station closed when the branch service was withdrawn on 1 December 1952.

Preceding station	Disused railways	Following station
Cossington; Line and station closed	Somerset & Dorset Joint Railway; LSWR and Midland Railways	Bridgwater North; Line and station closed
