= Shapwick railway station =

Former railway station in England

Coordinates: 51.1670°N 2.8267°W

Shapwick
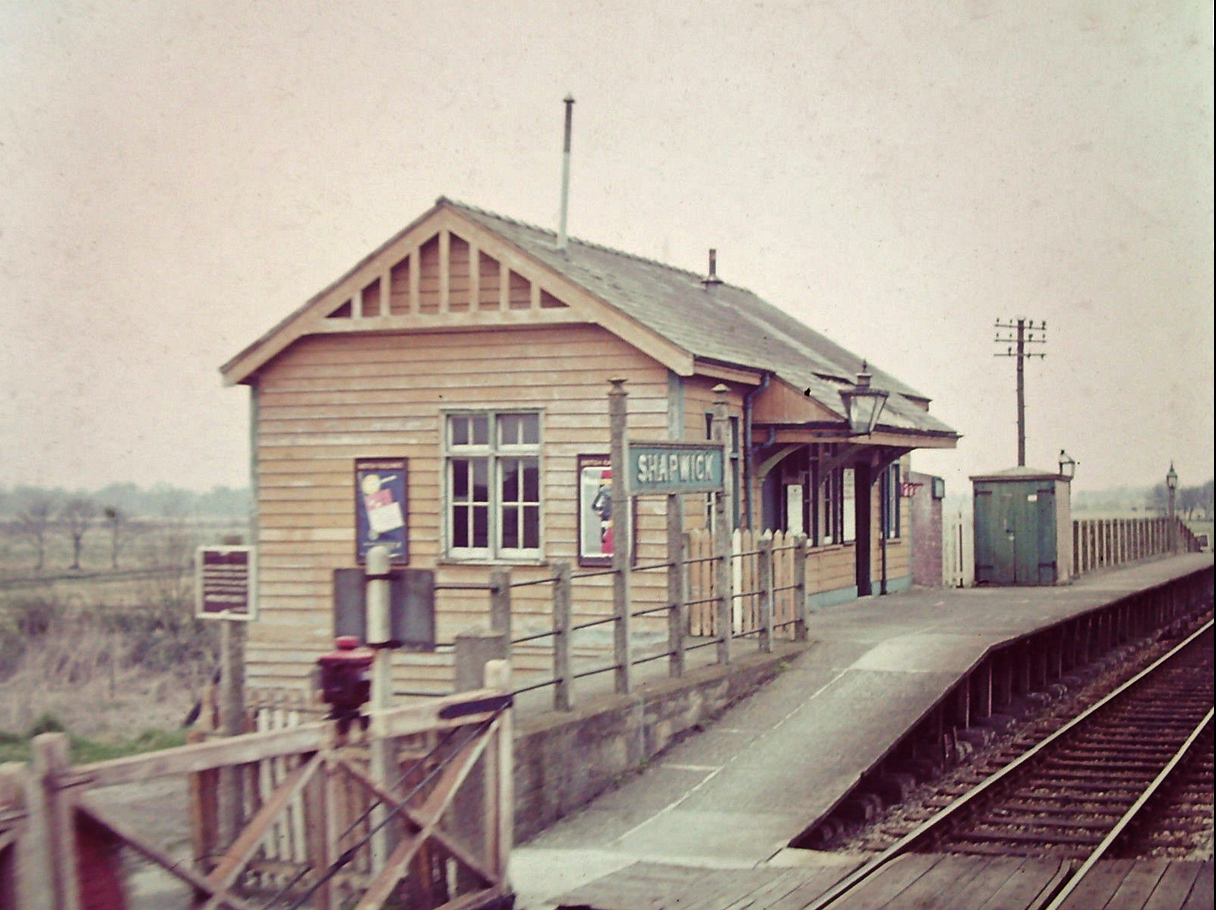
- Shapwick in 1960

General information
- Location: Shapwick, Somerset; England
- Grid reference: ST423412
- Platforms: 2

Other information
- Status: Disused

History
- Pre-grouping: Somerset Central Railway
- Post-grouping: SR and LMS; Western Region of British Railways

Key dates
- 28 August 1854: Opened
- 7 March 1966: Closed
Location

Shapwick station was a railway station on the Highbridge branch of the Somerset and Dorset Joint Railway. Opened by the Somerset Central Railway in 1854, the station consisted of a goods yard, a passing loop with two platforms, and a wooden station building which burned down and was replaced in 1900.

The passing-loop and a level crossing were operated from a 17-lever signal box, which was opened in 1901 to replace one destroyed in the 1900 fire.

The station was two and a half miles from the village of Shapwick and appeared in some early timetables as "Shapwick Road", though this does not seem to have ever been an official name.

The station was closed, with the rest of the branch, on 7 March 1966.

The line and station were held in fond regard by John Betjeman who in 1963 featured them in a BBC programme, Let's Imagine: a Branch Line Railway, in which Betjeman travels from Evercreech Junction to Burnham on Sea.

Preceding station	Disused railways	Following station
Ashcott; Line and station closed	Somerset & Dorset Joint Railway; LSWR and Midland Railways	Edington Junction; Line and station closed
