= Ashcott railway station =

Disused railway station in Ashcott, Somerset

Coordinates: 51.15389°N 2.78921°W

Ashcott
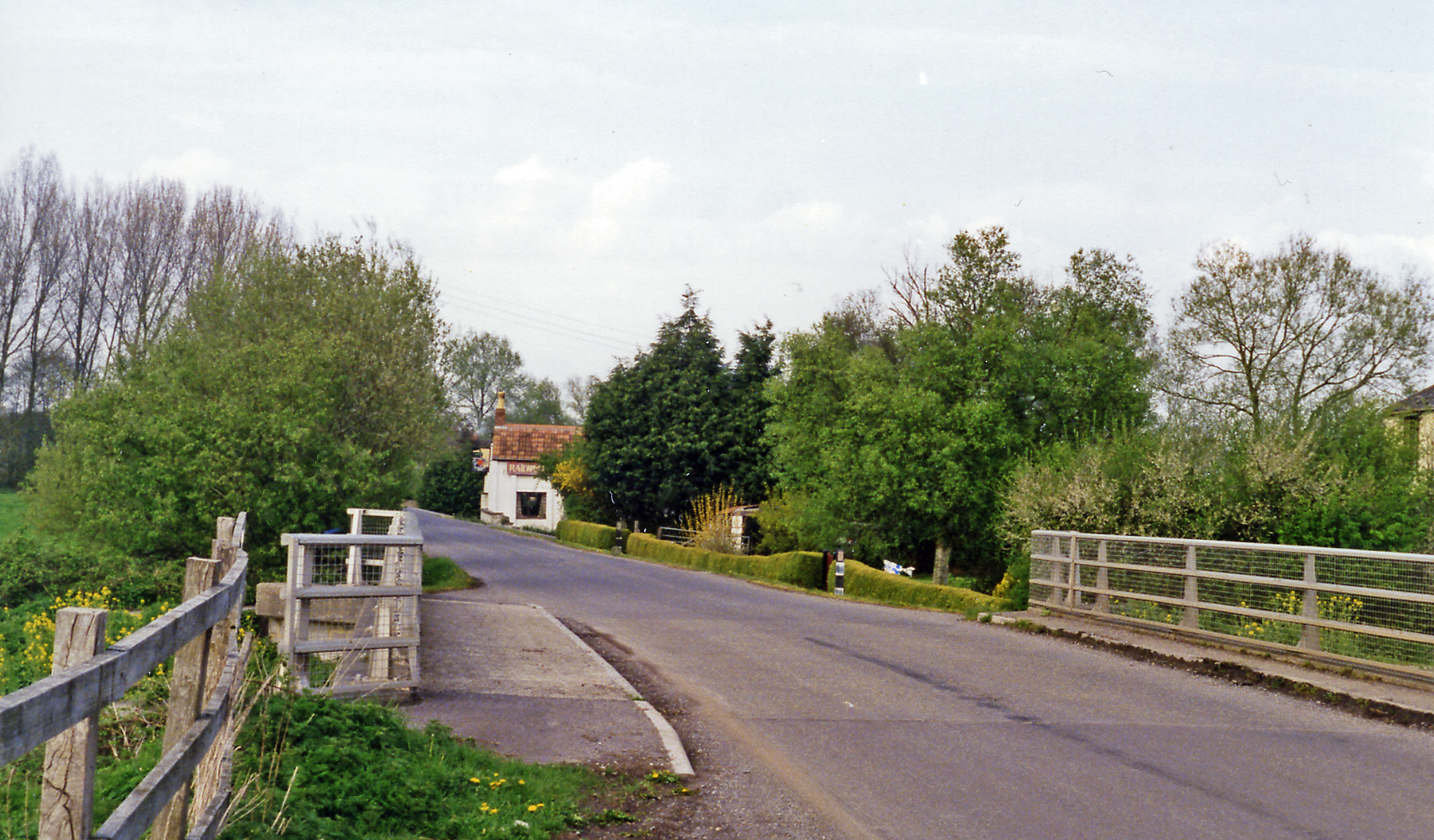
- Site of the station in 1995

General information
- Location: Ashcott, Somerset; England
- Grid reference: ST449397
- Platforms: 1

Other information
- Status: Disused

History
- Pre-grouping: Somerset Central Railway
- Post-grouping: SR and LMS; Western Region of British Railways

Key dates
- July 1856: Station opened as Ashcott and Meare
- 1876: Renamed Ashcott
- 7 March 1966: Station closed
Location

Ashcott railway station was a station on the Highbridge branch of the Somerset and Dorset Joint Railway. Opened by the Somerset Central Railway in 1856 as Ashcott and Meare, the name changed to Ashcott in 1876. Consisting of a short wooden platform and station building, the station was next to a road level crossing. This was operated with a 10 lever ground frame.

== History ==
The station was opened by the Somerset Central Railway and became part of the Somerset and Dorset Railway when the SCR merged with the Dorset Central Railway in 1862. From 1875, the line was called the Somerset and Dorset Joint Railway, as a joint line run by a committee for the Midland Railway and the Southern Railway. The line became a joint operation of the Southern Railway and the London, Midland and Scottish Railway after the grouping of 1923. It was placed in the Western Region when the railways were nationalised in 1948. The station closed when trains were withdrawn during the Beeching Axe, taking effect on 7 March 1966.

== Eclipse Peat Company ==
0.5 miles (0.80 km) west of Ashcott existed Alexander Siding, which allowed exchange between the SD&JR and the Eclipse Peat Works 2 ft (610 mm) industrial tramway system, and hence distribution of cut peat products across the United Kingdom. The Eclipse also had a level crossing on the SD&JR branch further towards Glastonbury.

On 19 August 1949, a British Railways passenger train from Highbridge collided with an Eclipse narrow gauge diesel locomotive crossing on the level and left the track, ending up in the Glastonbury Canal.

Preceding station	Disused railways	Following station
Glastonbury and Street; Line and station closed	Somerset & Dorset Joint Railway; LSWR and Midland Railways	Shapwick; Line and station closed
