= Burtle Priory =

Coordinates: 51.1713°N 2.8730°W

Monastery information
- Order: Augustinian
- Established: 1199

People
- Founder(s): William son of Godfrey of Eddington

Site
- Location: Burtle, Somerset, England
- Grid reference: ST391416

Burtle Priory shown within Somerset
(grid reference ST391416)

Burtle Priory (also known as Burtle Moor Priory) originated as a hermitage on a site called Sprauellissmede (or Sprawlesmede), in Burtle, Somerset, England.

It was endowed by William son of Godfrey of Eddington in 1199. It was later known as St Stephens chapel and by 1312 a house of the Augustinian Canons Regular. In 1535 the priory was worth £6 5s. 2d.

The present day Church of St Philip and St James stands on the site of the Priory. It was built in 1838-9 by Richard Carver, the County Architect and Surveyor, and is a Grade II listed building.
