= Shapwick School =

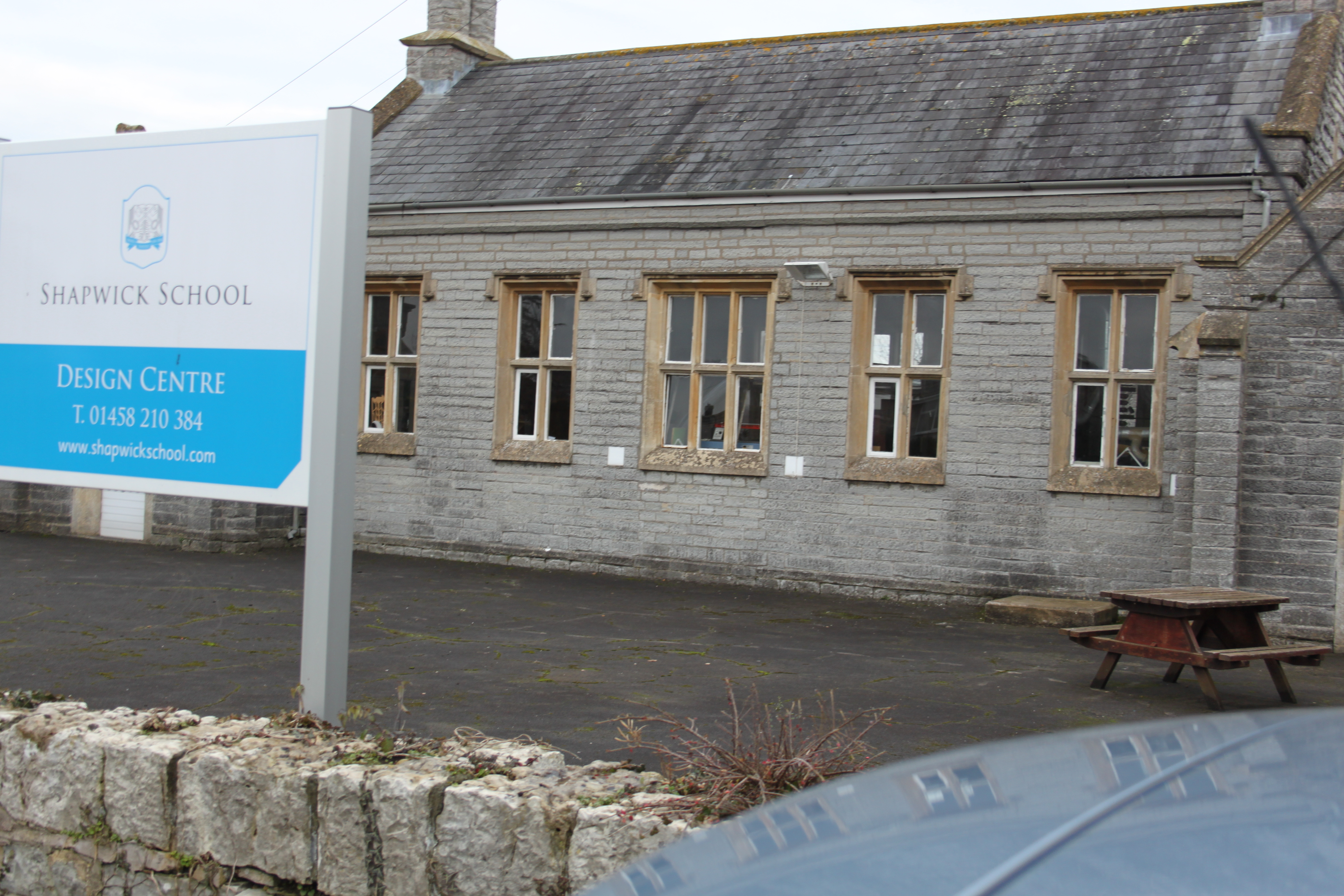

Location
- Station Road; Shapwick, Somerset, TA7 9NJ; England; 51.1422°N 2.8341°W

Information
- Type: Specialist school Private school Residential special school
- Motto: The same road by different steps
- Religious affiliation: Multi-denominational
- Established: 1974
- Founder: Colin Atkinson
- Closed: April 2020
- Specialist: Dyslexia, dyspraxia, dyscalculia
- Department for Education URN: 123929 Tables
- Ofsted: Reports
- Joint Principals: Gareth Wright and Hellen Lush
- Gender: Co-ed
- Age: 8 to 18
- Enrolment: 100
- Houses: 3 boarding houses; 2 on site in Shapwick and 1 in Meare
- Former names: Chalice School; Edington & Shapwick School
- Website: http://www.shapwickschool.com/

Shapwick School was a specialist school at Shapwick Manor in Shapwick, a village on the Somerset Levels in Somerset, England. In March 2020, it was announced that the school would close at the end of term in March due to financial difficulties.

The fee-paying school specialised in the holistic education of pupils with dyslexia and its related learning disabilities such as dyscalculia, Developmental coordination disorder, pragmatic language impairment, and specific language impairment. It had pupils aged 8 to 18, most of whom were boarders, while the rest were day pupils. The therapy department offered speech and language and occupational therapy within the timetable according to assessed need. Pupils in the sixth form received direct support from the school but studied at Bridgwater College.

The school was accredited by the Council for the Registration of Schools Teaching Dyslexic Pupils (CReSTeD), and the Royal College of Speech and Language Therapists.

In November 2010, the school gained national attention when it briefly featured in a BBC Three documentary Kara Tointon: Don't Call Me Stupid about actress Kara Tointon who has dyslexia. Tointon visited the school to see how it approaches the teaching of pupils with dyslexia. She sat in a class, learning new techniques for addressing her own dyslexia, and talked to some of the pupils about their experiences.

== History ==
In 1974, Colin Atkinson, a former cricketer for Somerset County Cricket Club and head of Millfield, established the Chalice School in Glastonbury to teach pupils with dyslexia. When Chalice closed two years later, Chalice headmaster Gerald Trump established Edington School in the old primary school building in Burtle. In 1981 a Senior School was created called Edington Senior School. In 1984, Shapwick Senior School was established. The two schools worked together until 1994 when they merged to become Edington & Shapwick School, operating on the two sites in Shapwick and Burtle, and run by joint headmasters. In 2015, the school's two sites were merged again onto the Shapwick campus.

From 1984, Jon Whittock and David Walker were joint headmasters, until David Walker's death in May 2011. In May 2013, Whittock stepped down as headmaster of Shapwick School for the next headmaster, Mr Lee. Adrian Wylie was principal from September 2014 until his retirement in July 2019. The final joint principals were Gareth Wright and Hellen Lush. On 31 March 2020, the school closed permanently.

== Successor schools ==
In March 2020, upon the announcement of the closure of Shapwick School, Abbot's Way School in Meare, Somerset was proposed by Shapwick's last Heads, Gareth Wright and Hellen Lush. An independent specialist day school for students with dyslexia, dyspraxia and dyscalculia is planned.

In April 2020, it was reported that a group of former staff from Shapwick School were planning to open a new school locally. The new school, called The Levels School, is in the village of Ashcott, close to the site of Shapwick School, and was founded by Bradley Middleton, who formerly worked in a pastoral capacity at Shapwick. Moving with him to The Levels School were teachers and therapists from Shapwick, including the former head of therapy. The school was given the green light by Sedgemoor District Council following a virtual meeting of its development committee on 4 August 2020. At the end of October, the school was awaiting an Ofsted visit before fully opening. The BBC reported on 26 November that The Levels School had received the green light from the Department for Education and would be opening in January 2021. Parents will be able to pay privately to send their children to the school, or they can apply for education, health and care plan (EHCP) funding through their local authority. It will be open for eight to 16-years-olds, for students with dyslexia and learning differences associated with the condition.
