= Harvey Trump =

English cricketer (born 1968)

Personal information
- Full name: Harvey Russell John Trump
- Born: 11 October 1968 (age 58); Taunton, Somerset, England
- Batting: Right-handed
- Bowling: Right-arm off-break
- Relatives: Gerald Trump (father); Henry Searle (son)

Domestic team information
- Years: Team
- 1988–1997: Somerset
- 1988: Marylebone Cricket Club

Career statistics
Competition	FC	LA
Matches	107	122
Runs scored	991	177
Batting average	12.38	7.37
100s/50s	0/0	0/0
Top score	48	19
Balls bowled	19146	5139
Wickets	243	107
Bowling average	38.78	35.95
5 wickets in innings	9	0
10 wickets in match	2	n/a
Best bowling	7/52	4/51
Catches/stumpings	76/–	46/–
- Source: CricketArchive, 22 December 2015

Harvey Russell John Trump (born 11 October 1968) is a former English cricketer who played for Somerset between 1988 and 1996.

Trump, the son of Gerald Trump, a former captain of both Somerset's Second XI and of Devon's Minor Counties side, was a lower-order right-handed batsman and a right-arm off-spin bowler. A successful school cricketer at Millfield School, he played for England's Under-19 team in Tests in Sri Lanka in 1986–87. In these three matches, he took seven wickets and also scored an unbeaten 50 in the final match at Galle.

He made his debut for Somerset in 1988 and played fairly regularly for nine seasons, without ever quite appearing to make the decisive breakthrough to be an automatic selection. His most successful seasons were 1991 and 1992: he took around 50 first-class wickets in each season and in 1992 against Gloucestershire, in the last first-class match played at the Wagon Works Ground at Gloucester, he took seven for 52 in each innings to give both his best innings and match figures.

But the following year Somerset recruited Mushtaq Ahmed as the county's overseas player and Trump's opportunities were more limited. Also, his batting never developed, and he failed to reach 50 in first-class matches. He did not appear in first-class matches after 1996 and played only a few more List A games before retiring to become, like his father, a schoolteacher. He has since played a few times for Herefordshire in the Minor Counties.

His son, Henry Searle (né Trump), is a tennis player.

After Retiring his cricket career, he went on to become a principal in Capital International Schools.
