= Edington railway station =

Former railway station in Somerset, England

Coordinates: 51.1811°N 2.8716°W

Edington Burtle
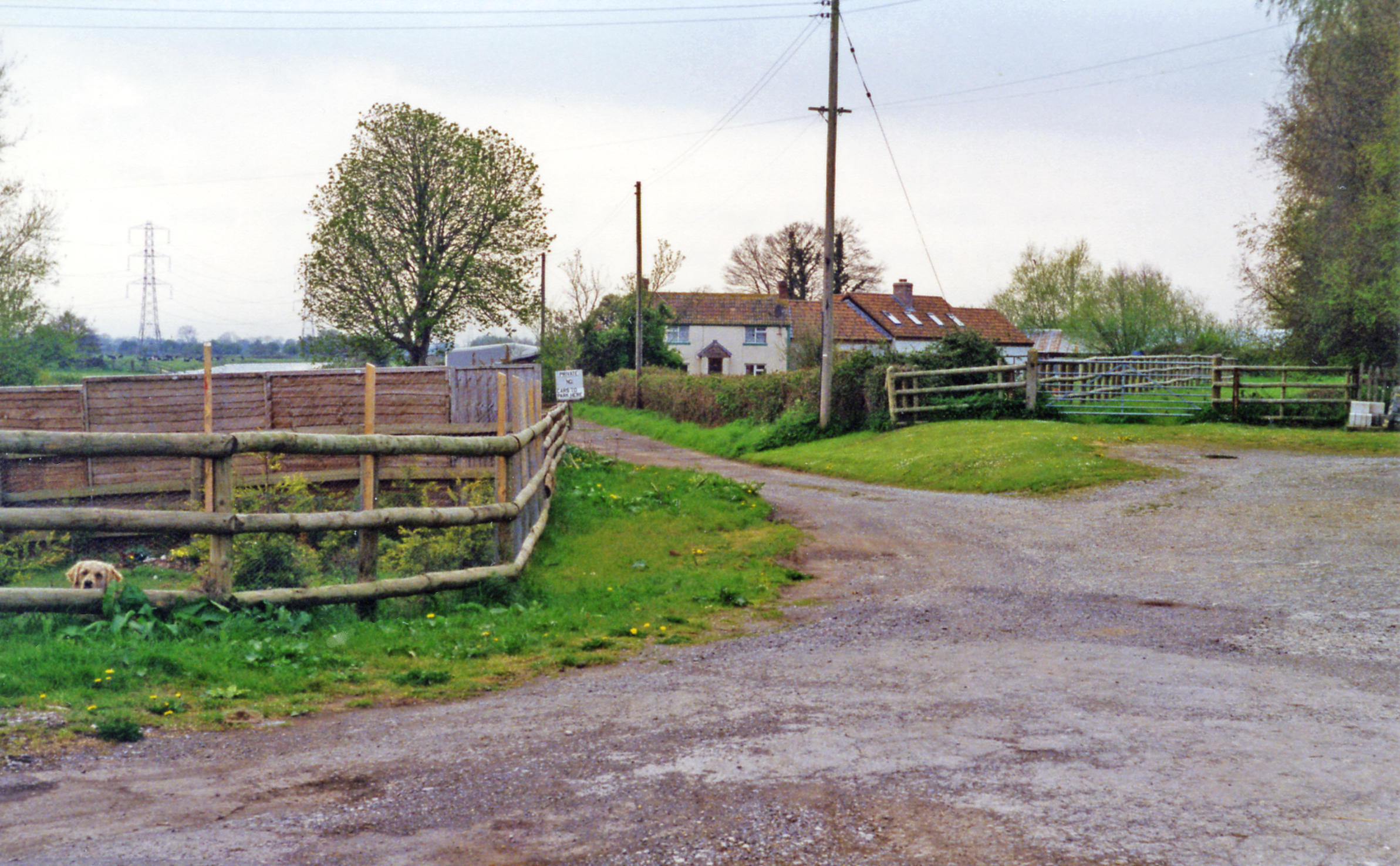
- Site of the station in 1995

General information
- Location: Edington, Somerset; England
- Grid reference: ST392428
- Platforms: 3

Other information
- Status: Disused

History
- Pre-grouping: Somerset Central Railway
- Post-grouping: SR and LMS; Western Region of British Railways

Key dates
- 1856: Opened (Edington Road)
- 21 July 1890: Renamed (Edington Junction)
- 8 June 1953: Renamed (Edington Burtle)
- 7 March 1966: Closed
Location

Edington Burtle railway station was a station on the Somerset and Dorset Joint Railway, and served the village of Edington, Somerset, UK. Originally named Edington Road, with the village two miles away, it became in 1890 the junction for the Bridgwater branch off the Highbridge line and for the next period in its life was known as Edington Junction. After the Bridgwater line closed to passengers in 1952, the station was renamed as Edington Burtle – Burtle is a village to the north of the station, and somewhat closer than Edington. In February 1956 the down platform and signal box was closed. Goods Yard closed on 13 July 1964. It closed in March 1966 when the line was shut as part of the Beeching axe.

Preceding station	Disused railways	Following station
Shapwick; Line and station closed	Somerset & Dorset Joint Railway; LSWR & Midland Railways; Highbridge Line	Bason Bridge; Line and station closed
Shapwick; Line and station closed	Somerset & Dorset Joint Railway; LSWR & Midland Railways; Bridgwater Branch	Cossington; Line and station closed
