= Shapwick Manor =

Manor house in Shapwick, Somerset, England

- Location within Somerset
- 51.1422°N 2.8341°W
- Location: Shapwick, Somerset, England

Listed Building – Grade II*
- Official name: Shapwick Manor
- Designated: 29 March 1963
- Reference no.: 1190512

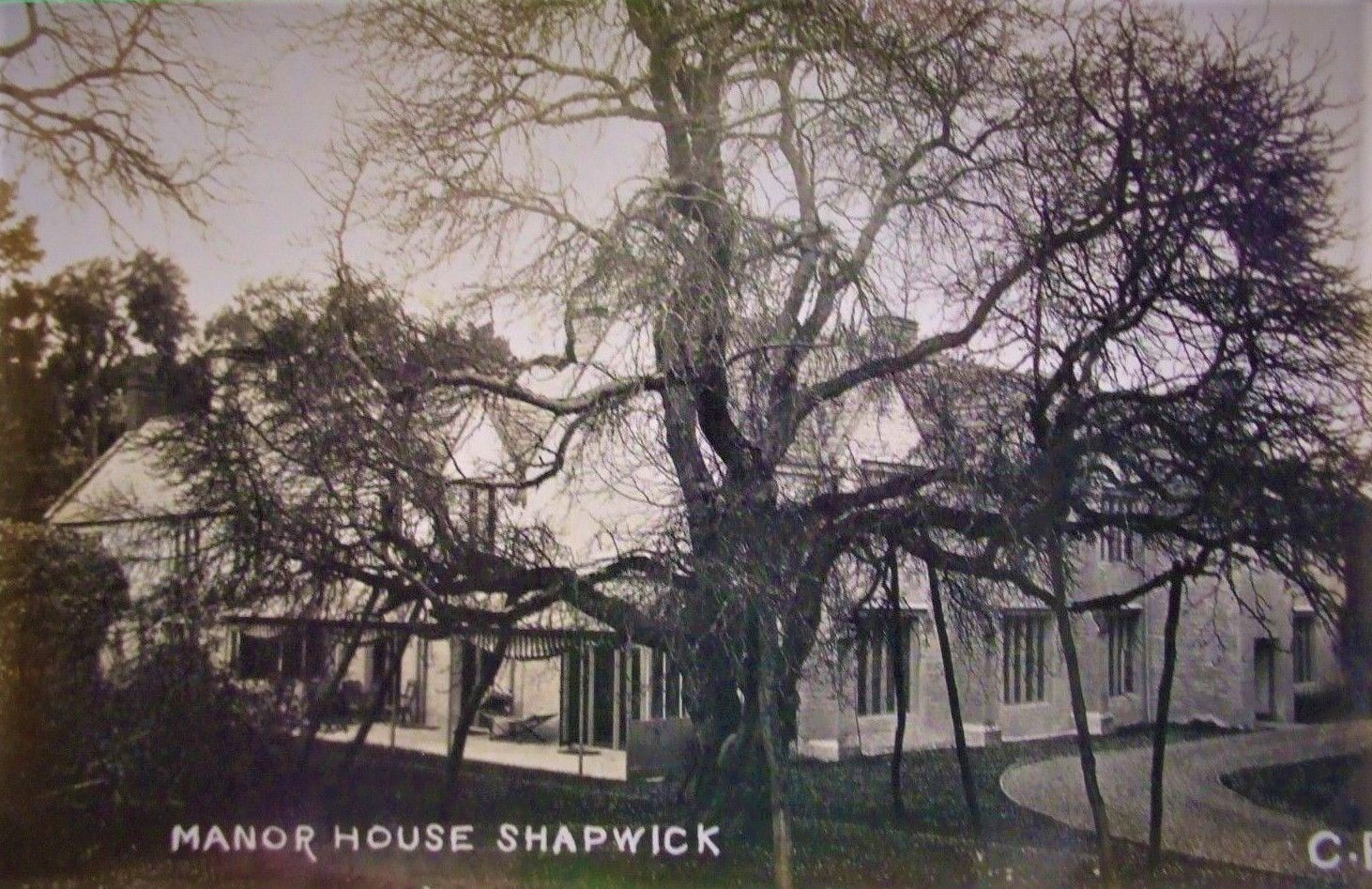
Postcard ca 1910

Shapwick Manor at Shapwick in the county of Somerset, England, is a medieval manor house, largely remodelled in the 19th century by Henry Strangways on his return from South Australia in 1871.

It is a Grade II* listed building.

It is not to be confused with Shapwick House, formerly an hotel, and more recently a rental property, which lies to the north of the village.

== History ==
The manor of Shapwick originally belonged to Glastonbury Abbey, forming part of its Pouholt (Polden) estate in 729.

The building that is known as Shapwick House, not the Manor, was built for the Almoner of Glastonbury Abbey in the Middle Ages. A survey in 1327 includes a 5 acres (2.0 ha) garden, moat and fishponds.

Between 1956 and 1980, Shapwick Manor was an outlying boarding house for boys at Millfield School, and was later home to Shapwick School, which closed in March 2020.

== Architecture ==
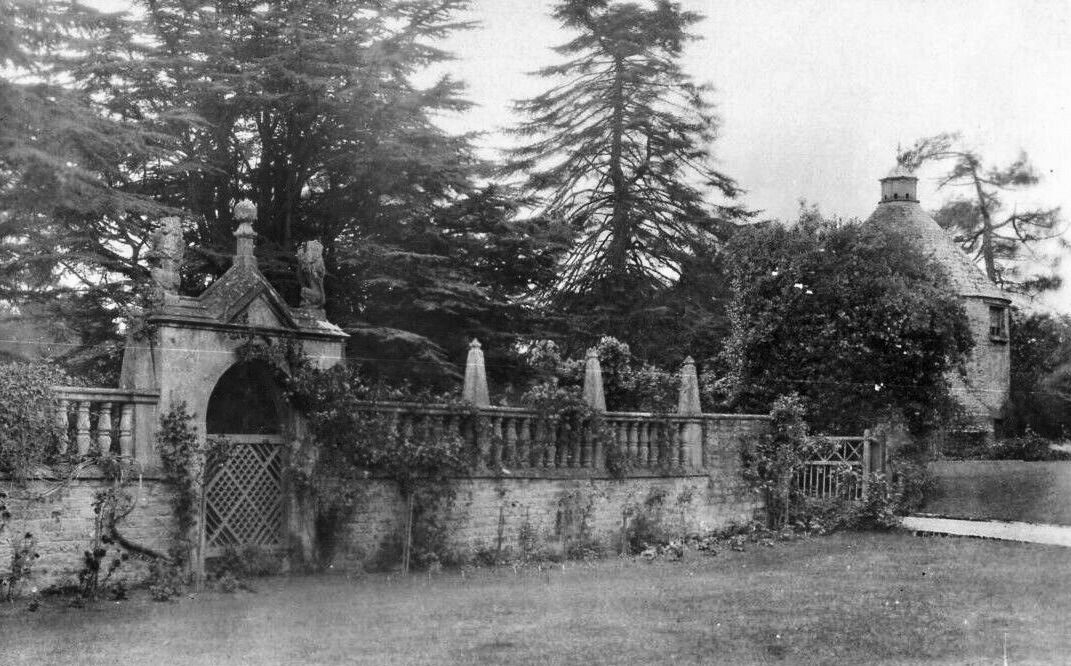
Garden Screen, ca 1910

Shapwick Manor is a two-storey stone building that has an asymmetrical frontage, formerly with a glazed veranda supported on iron columns to one side of the building.

The stable block, which was built in the 17th century, is also Grade II* listed.

The dovecote is medieval but was restored in the 18th and 19th centuries; it was re-roofed in the 20th century.

The stone screen (illustrated) and flanking walls were built around 1658.
