= Bridgwater North railway station =

Disused railway station in England

Bridgwater North
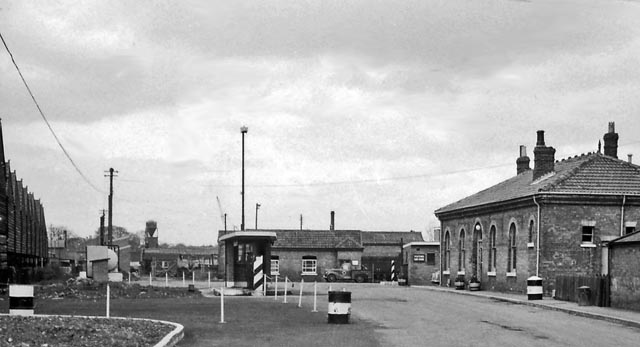
- The station in 1963

General information
- Location: Bridgwater, Somerset; England
- Coordinates: 51.1326°N 2.9959°W
- Grid reference: ST304374
- Platforms: 2

Other information
- Status: Disused

History
- Original company: Bridgwater Railway
- Pre-grouping: Bridgwater Railway
- Post-grouping: Somerset and Dorset Joint Railway

Key dates
- 21 July 1890: Opened as Bridgwater
- 26 September 1949: Renamed Bridgwater North
- 1 December 1952: Closed for passengers
- 7 July 1962: closed for goods
Location

Bridgwater Railway Act 1882
- Act of Parliament
- Parliament of the United Kingdom
- Long title: An Act for incorporating the Bridgewater Railway Company and authorising them to make and maintain the Bridgewater Railway and for authorising arrangements between them and the London and South-western Railway Company and for other purposes.
- Citation: 45 & 46 Vict. c. ccliii

Dates
- Royal assent: 18 August 1882

Text of statute as originally enacted

Bridgwater Railway Act 1886
- Act of Parliament
- Parliament of the United Kingdom
- Long title: An Act for conferring further powers on the Bridgewater Railway Company in relation to their Undertaking and for other purposes.
- Citation: 50 Vict. c. liv

Dates
- Royal assent: 25 September 1886

Text of statute as originally enacted

Bridgwater Railway Act 1888
- Act of Parliament
- Parliament of the United Kingdom
- Long title: An Act for conferring further powers on the Bridgewater Railway Company.
- Citation: 51 & 52 Vict. c. cxcv

Dates
- Royal assent: 10 August 1888

Bridgwater North railway station was the terminus of the Bridgwater Railway, authorised by the Bridgwater Railway Act 1882 (45 & 46 Vict. c. ccliii), which ran from a junction with the Somerset and Dorset Joint Railway at Edington, between 1890 and 1954. Although often regarded as part of the Somerset and Dorset Joint Railway, and effectively worked as part of that system, the Bridgwater Railway remained nominally independent until the railway Grouping of 1923 when it was vested in the Somerset and Dorset Joint Railway group.

- A railway seven miles one furlong and four chains in length commencing in the parish of Edington by a junction with the main line of the Somerset and Dorset Railway at or near the Edington Station on that railway and terminating in the parish of Bridgewater in a field at or near the junctions of the main roads from Bridgewater to Bristol and from Bridgewater to Glastonbury and Wells with Monmouth Street.
— Section 5, Bridgwater Railway Act 1882 (45 & 46 Vict. c. ccliii)

== The station ==
Originally named Bridgwater, the station was opened on 21 July 1890. It was renamed Bridgwater North in 1949 when it came under British Railways ownership, to avoid confusion with the larger former Great Western Railway (GWR) station in the town. The station consisted of an island platform with a canopy, goods yard and a connection to riverside wharves.

== Closure ==
The passenger station closed when the branch service was withdrawn on 1 December 1952. The line to Edington Burtle via Cossington was closed completely in 1954 after goods traffic was diverted over a new connection to the GWR docks branch which continued until 1962. Bridgwater railway station remains open on the Bristol to Taunton Line.

The site is now occupied by a Sainsbury's supermarket and an adjacent large retail park.

Preceding station	Disused railways	Following station
Bawdrip Halt; Line and station closed	Somerset and Dorset Joint Railway; Bridgwater Railway	Terminus
