= Shapwick, Somerset =

Village in Somerset, England

Coordinates: 51.141°N 2.833°W

Shapwick
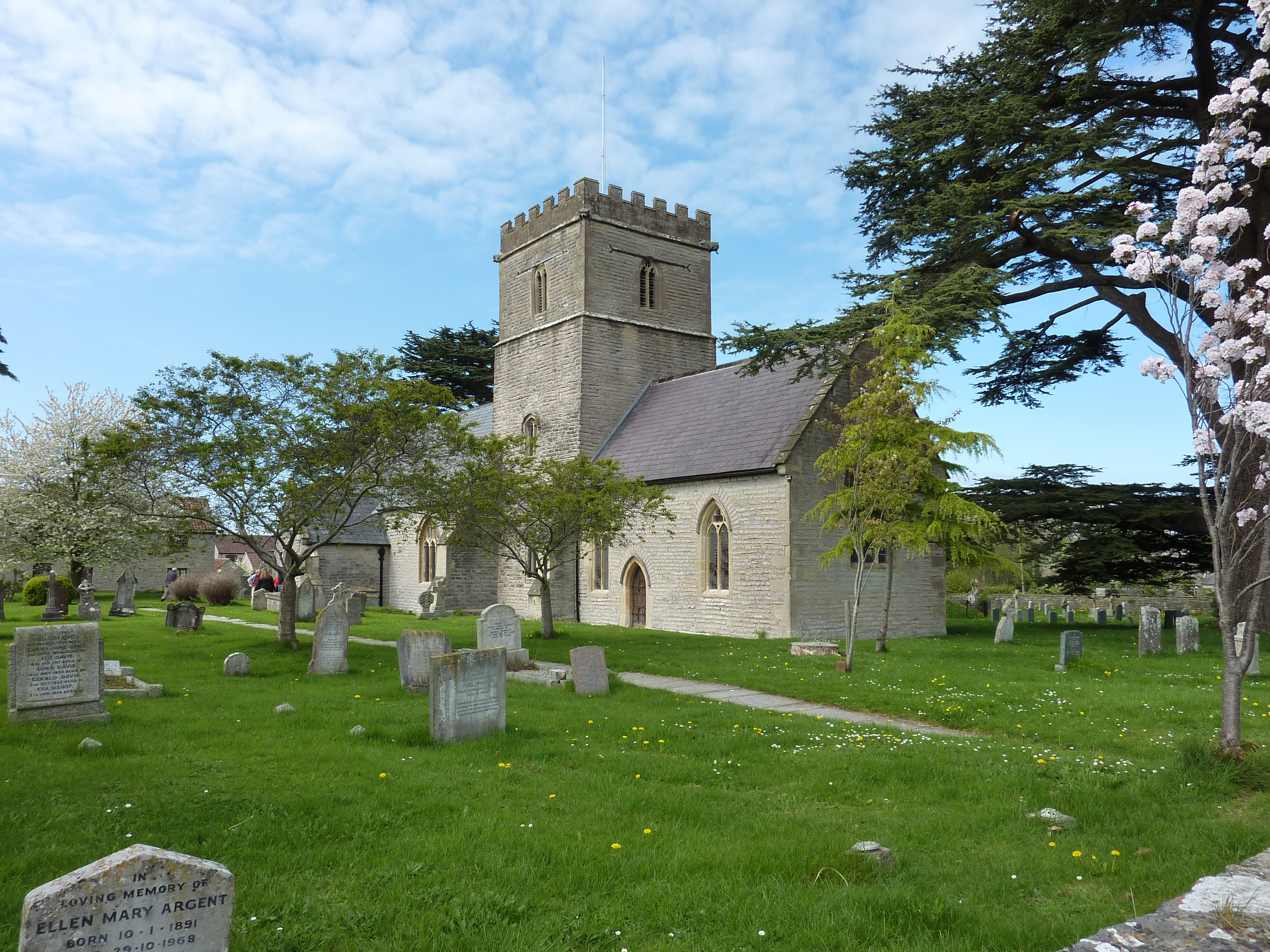
- Church of St Mary

- Location within Somerset
- Population: 536 {2011}
- OS grid reference: ST418382
- Unitary authority: Somerset Council
- Ceremonial county: Somerset
- Region: South West
- Country: England
- Sovereign state: United Kingdom
- Post town: BRIDGWATER
- Postcode district: TA7
- Dialling code: 01458
- Police: Avon and Somerset
- Fire: Devon and Somerset
- Ambulance: South Western
- UK Parliament: Wells and Mendip Hills

Shapwick is a village on the Polden Hills overlooking the Somerset Moors, in Somerset, England. It is situated to the west of Glastonbury.

== History ==
Shapwick is the site of one end of the Sweet Track, a 6,000-year-old, ancient, wooden causeway, dating from the 39th century BC.

In 1998 a hoard of 9,238 silver denarii (the second largest hoard ever found from the Roman Empire, and the largest in the United Kingdom) was discovered in the remains of a previously unknown Roman villa near Shapwick. Following a Treasure Inquest in Taunton, the hoard was valued and acquired in its entirety by Somerset County Museums Service for the sum of £265,000. It became known as the Shapwick Hoard.

The parish of Shapwick was part of the Whitley Hundred.

Due to the plan of its roads and streets academics have described it as a "typical English village". Shapwick is one of the nine Thankful Villages in Somerset — those that suffered no casualties in World War I. The village was featured on Darren Hayman's album, Thankful Villages Volume 2.

== Manor ==
The manor of Shapwick originally belonged to Glastonbury Abbey, forming part of its Pouholt (Polden) estate in 729. It was divided into two halves in medieval times. After the dissolution of the monasteries the manor passed to Thomas Walton and then to the Rolle family.

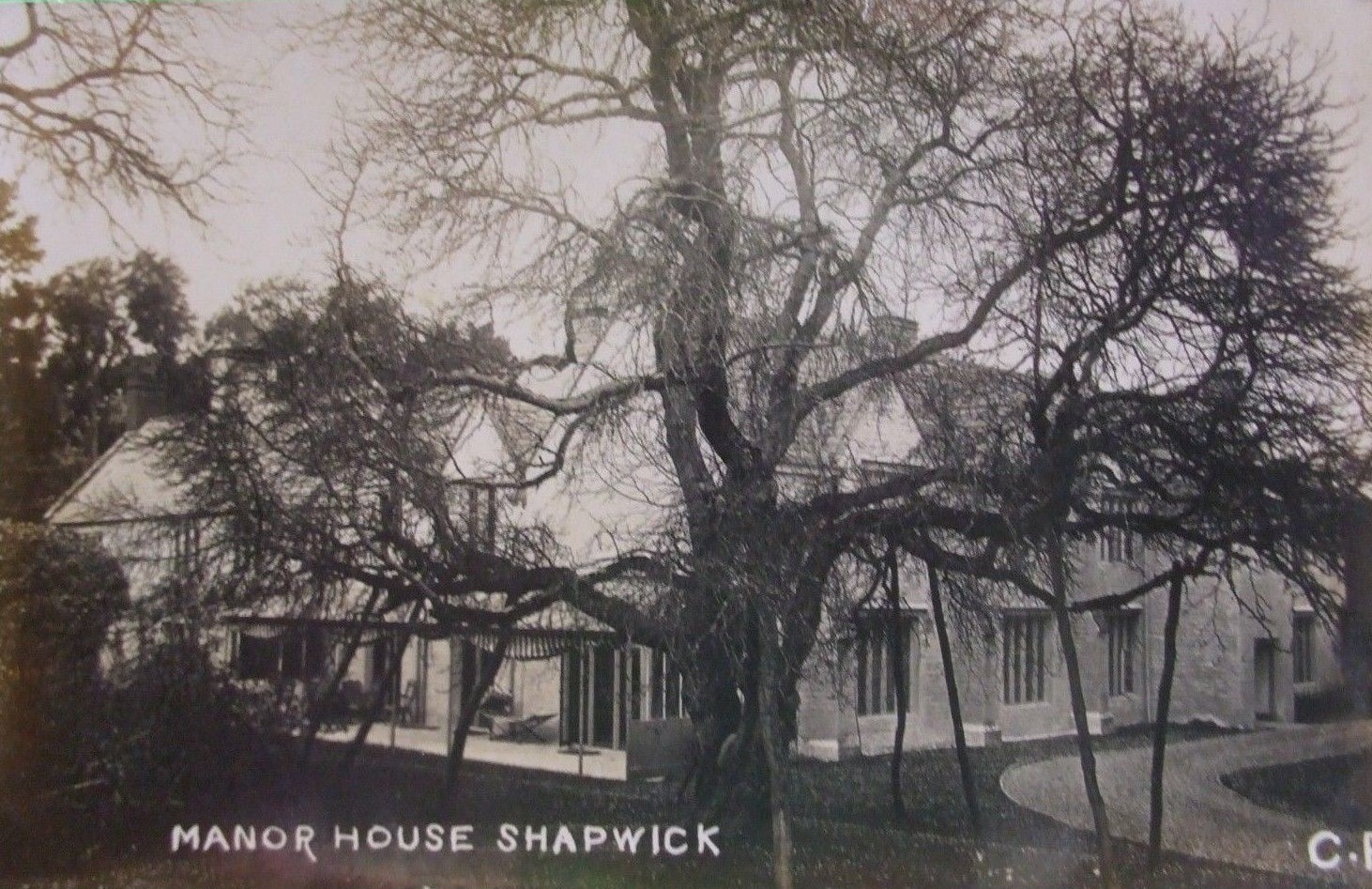
Shapwick Manor, circa 1910

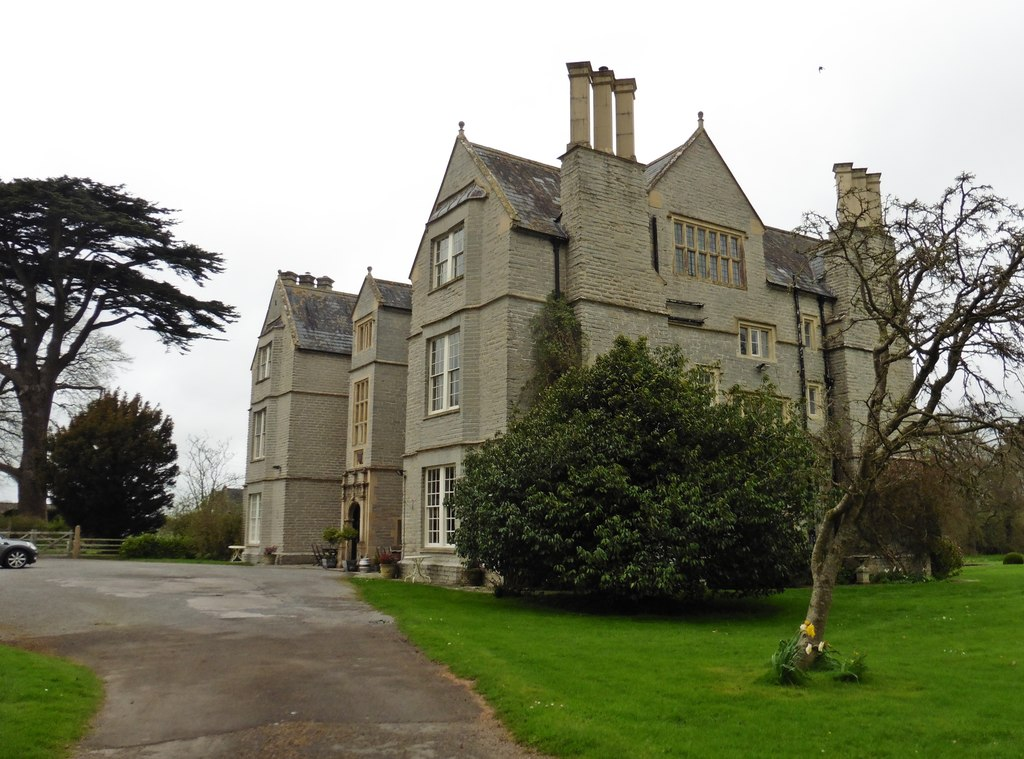
Shapwick House Hotel

Shapwick House was built by Sir Henry Rolle in 1630 in place of the original manor house. The property was sold in 1786/7 by Denys Rolle (1725-1797) of Stevenstone in Devon, to George Templer (1755-1819) of the East India Company 4th son of James I Templer (1722–1782) of Stover, Teigngrace. Shapwick House is a Grade II* listed building and is now an hotel. Originally it was moated but the moat was filled in during the rebuilding by Henry Bull in the first quarter of the 17th century.

The manor house (Shapwick Manor, previously known as Down House) was built after the manor was split in two. It dates from around 1475. Shapwick Manor is also a Grade II* listed building.

== Governance ==
The parish council has responsibility for local issues, including setting an annual precept (local rate) to cover the council's operating costs and producing annual accounts for public scrutiny. The parish council evaluates local planning applications and works with the local police, district council officers, and neighbourhood watch groups on matters of crime, security, and traffic. The parish council's role also includes initiating projects for the maintenance and repair of parish facilities, as well as consulting with the district council on the maintenance, repair, and improvement of highways, drainage, footpaths, public transport, and street cleaning. Conservation matters (including trees and listed buildings) and environmental issues are also the responsibility of the council.

For local government purposes, since 1 April 2023, the village comes under the unitary authority of Somerset Council. Prior to this, it was part of the non-metropolitan district of Sedgemoor, which was formed on 1 April 1974 under the Local Government Act 1972, having previously been part of Bridgwater Rural District. Policing is provided by the Avon and Somerset Constabulary.

It is also part of the Wells and Mendip Hills constituency represented in the House of Commons of the Parliament of the United Kingdom. It elects one member of parliament (MP) by the first past the post system of election.

== Geography ==
Shapwick Heath is a biological Site of Special Scientific Interest and national nature reserve It is a former raised bog lying in the basin of the River Brue. The site supports a diverse community of terrestrial and aquatic invertebrates. National rarities are the large marsh grasshopper (Stethophyma grossum) found on sphagnum moss bogs, the greater silver diving beetle (Hydrophilus piceus) and the lesser silver diving beetle (Hydrochara caraboides) which is now confined nationally to the Brue Basin Peat Moors.

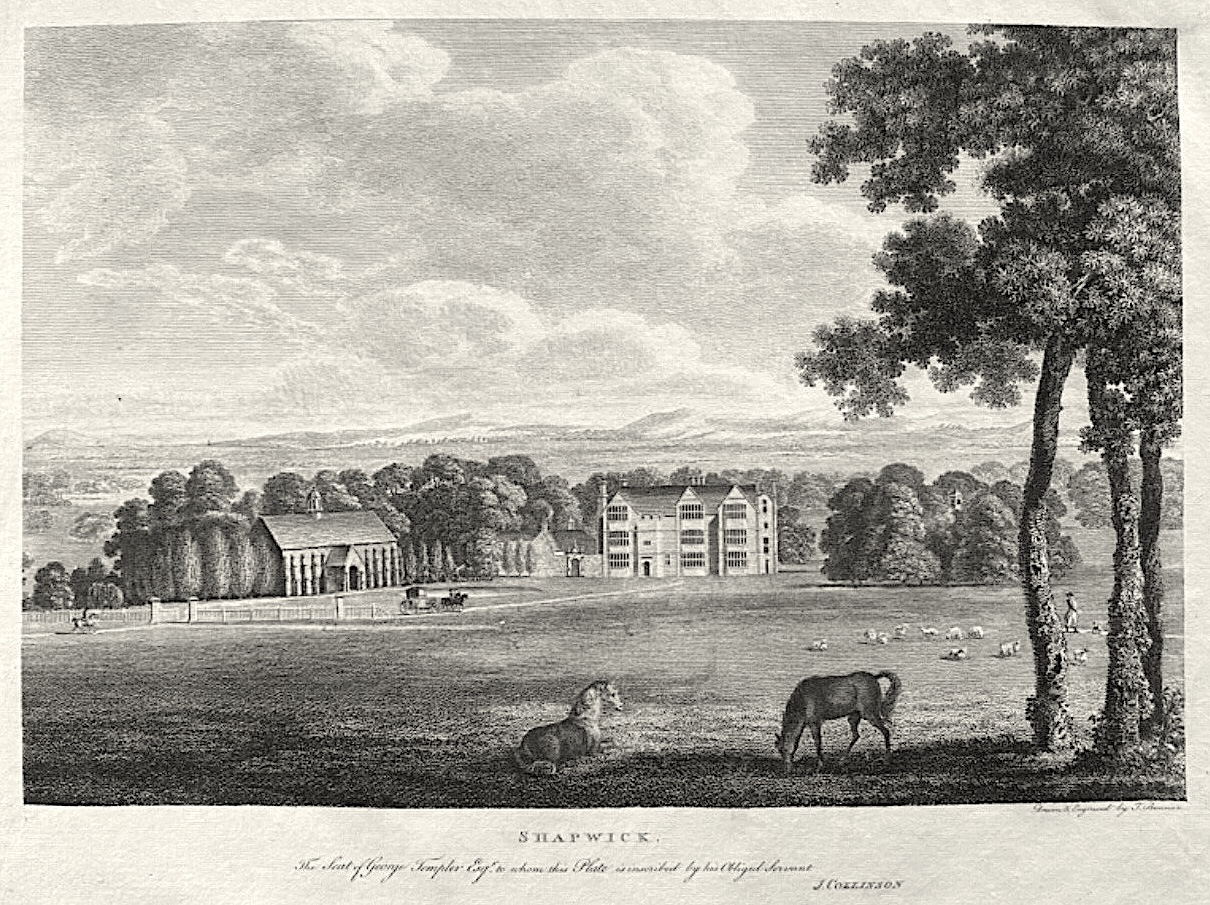
Shapwick House in a 1791 engraving by Thomas Bonnor

The adjoining Shapwick Moor has been purchased by the Hawk and Owl Trust and will be their first reserve in south west England. The land will be farmed traditionally in order to recreate the habitats of the past. The management plan for the site is being overseen by Natural England. The first steps in the creation of the nature reserve are to reseed the land and then reintroduce Devon ruby red cattle to the site. The priority is to encourage wildlife, not human visitors and there will be no visitor centre or permanent structures, but a public footpath which crosses the site will be improved and hides built along the footpath at key vantage points. Birds identified at the site include: buzzard, sparrowhawk, kestrel, hobby, red kite, barn owl, lapwing, pheasant, cuckoo, woodpecker and skylark.

== Religious sites ==
The Anglican parish Church of St Mary, which was consecrated in 1331, is an anachronism. Parts of the current building including the piscina and font were moved from an earlier church in fields outside the village. Its central tower is a style that was at least a century out of date. It underwent some alteration in the 15th century, particularly to tower and West end, with further restoration in 1861 by George Gilbert Scott. It has been designated as a Grade II* listed building.

== Education ==
Shapwick was home to Shapwick School, founded in Glastonbury 1974, but moved into the village in 1984.

It was a special school for children aged 8 to 18 with dyslexia. Pupils aged 13 to 18 were based at Shapwick Senior School in the village, while those aged 8 to 12 attended Shapwick Prep in nearby Burtle.

In November 2010, the school was featured in November a BBC Three documentary Kara Tointon: Don't call me stupid about actress Kara Tointon, who has dyslexia.

Shapwick School received an 'inadequate' rating from OFSTED in 2020. The school ran out of money and closed in March that year.

== Transport ==
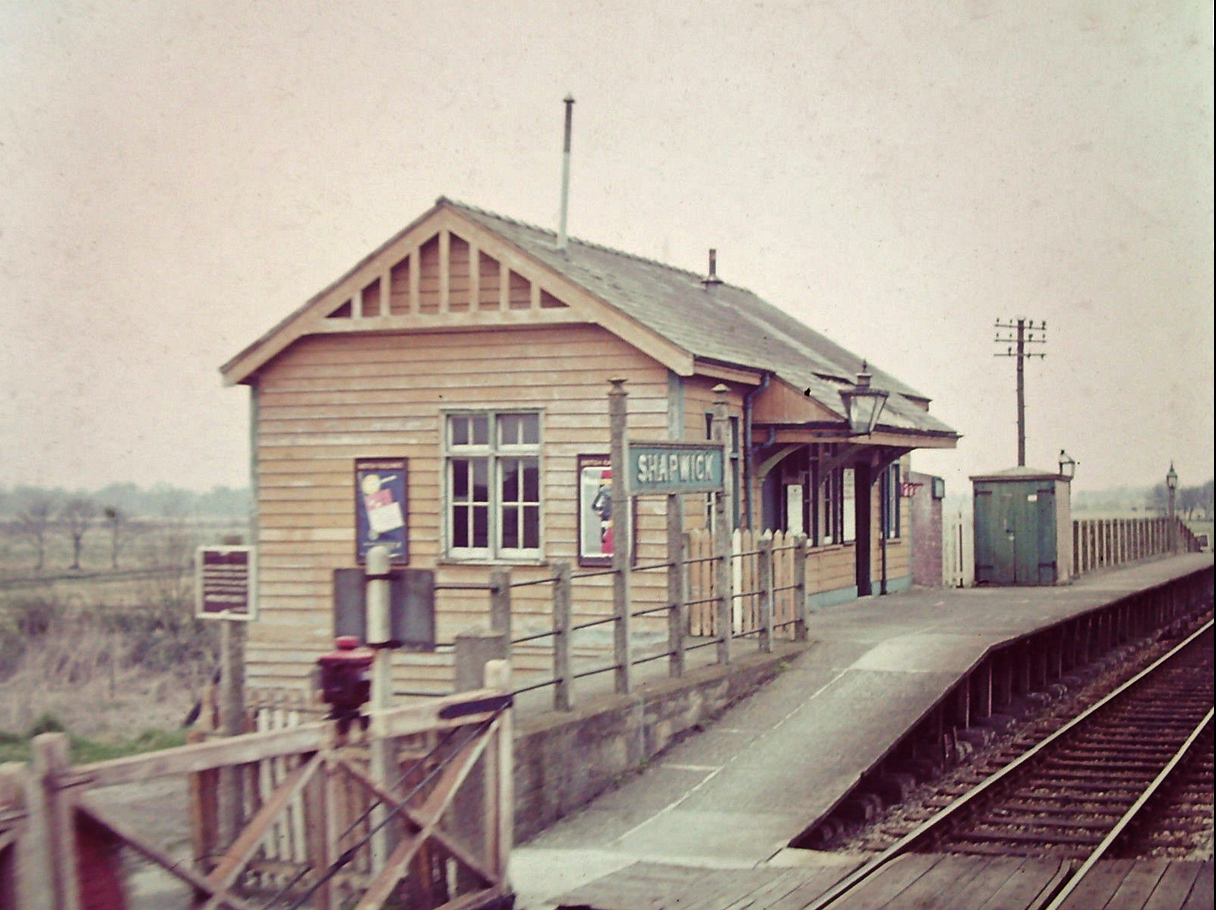
Shapwick Station, ticket office and waiting room, photographed in 1960 (located on southern ('Up') platform)

Shapwick railway station was a station on the Highbridge branch of the Somerset and Dorset Joint Railway. It opened in 1854 and closed in 1966.

== Notable residents ==
=== Politics ===
- Abraham Burrell (1589–1657), politician who sat in the House of Commons from 1645 to 1653, lived at Shapwick Manor.
- Denys Rolle (1725–1797), politician who sat in the House of Commons from 1761 to 1774, lived at Shapwick Manor.
- Francis Rolle (1630–1686), lawyer and politician who sat in the House of Commons at various times between 1656 and 1685, lived at Shapwick Manor.
- Henry Rolle (1589–1656), Chief Justice of the King's Bench, politician who sat in the House of Commons at various times between 1614 and 1629, and father of Francis Rolle, lived at Shapwick Manor and was buried there.
- Samuel Rolle (c. 1588 – 1647), politician who sat in the House of Commons at various times between 1640 and 1647, was sold Shapwick Manor alongside Hugh Fortescue and Henry Rolle.
- Henry Strangways (1832–1920), Australian politician, was born in Shapwick.
- George Templer (c. 1755 – 1819), writer, merchant and politician who sat in the House of Commons from 1790 to 1796, lived at Shapwick Manor.

=== Sport ===
- Calum Haggett (born 1990), first-class cricketer, grew up in Shapwick.
- Jake Seamer (1913–2006), amateur cricketer, was born and grew up in Shapwick.

=== Other ===
- Churchill Julius (1847–1938), Anglican cleric, later the first Archbishop of New Zealand, was briefly Vicar of Shapwick in the 1870s.
- Joan Marsham (1888–1972), Girl Guide leader, was born in Shapwick.
- Giles E. Strangways (1819–1906), pioneer of the British colony of South Australia and uncle of Henry Strangways, was born in Shapwick.

== In popular culture ==
In 2012, the musician Jon Brookes (also known as 'The Advisory Circle' of the Ghost Box record label) released the electronica album Shapwick (on the Clay Pipe record label) based on "an imaginary impression of" the village and its surrounding countryside, following an unplanned car journey through the area one autumn evening: "I felt a certain energy around the place. The images created by the trees in the dark conjured inspiration and it struck me that an album could be based on an imaginary impression of this area. I had already recorded some pieces that were in search of a home and the idea formed within seconds."

Shapwick also featured in songwriter Daren Hayman's Thankful Villages project in 2017. Hayman visited each of the 54 villages and recorded songs and interviews with local residents and a short film. The film for Shapwick features Darren performing his song based on the folk tale "The Mistletoe Bride" in locations around the village.
