= Edington, Somerset =

Village in Somerset, England

Coordinates: 51.151°N 2.881°W

Edington
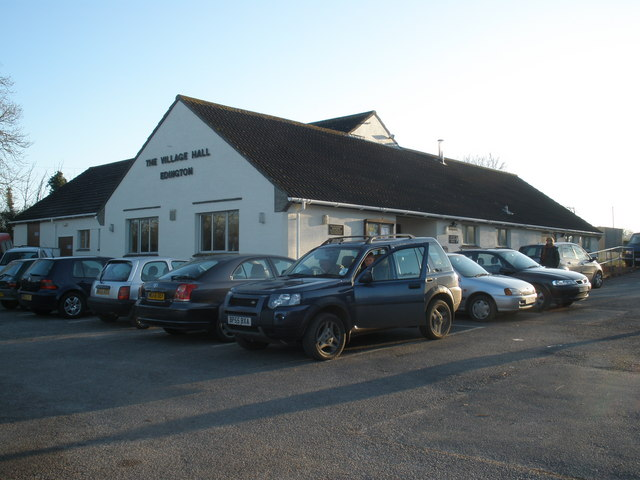
- The Village Hall

- Location within Somerset
- Population: 373 (2021 census)
- OS grid reference: ST385395
- Unitary authority: Somerset Council
- Ceremonial county: Somerset
- Region: South West
- Country: England
- Sovereign state: United Kingdom
- Post town: Bridgwater
- Postcode district: TA7
- Dialling code: 01278
- Police: Avon and Somerset
- Fire: Devon and Somerset
- Ambulance: South Western
- UK Parliament: Wells and Mendip Hills

Edington is a rural village, situated on the north side of the Polden Hills in Somerset, England. There is evidence of human activity in the area since the Bronze Age and the settlement has an entry in the Domesday book.

Either side of it lie the villages of Chilton Polden and Catcott, and north of it is the small village of Burtle. There is a 12th-century church, but the nearest primary school is in the village of Catcott.

Edington has a GP surgery and a village hall.

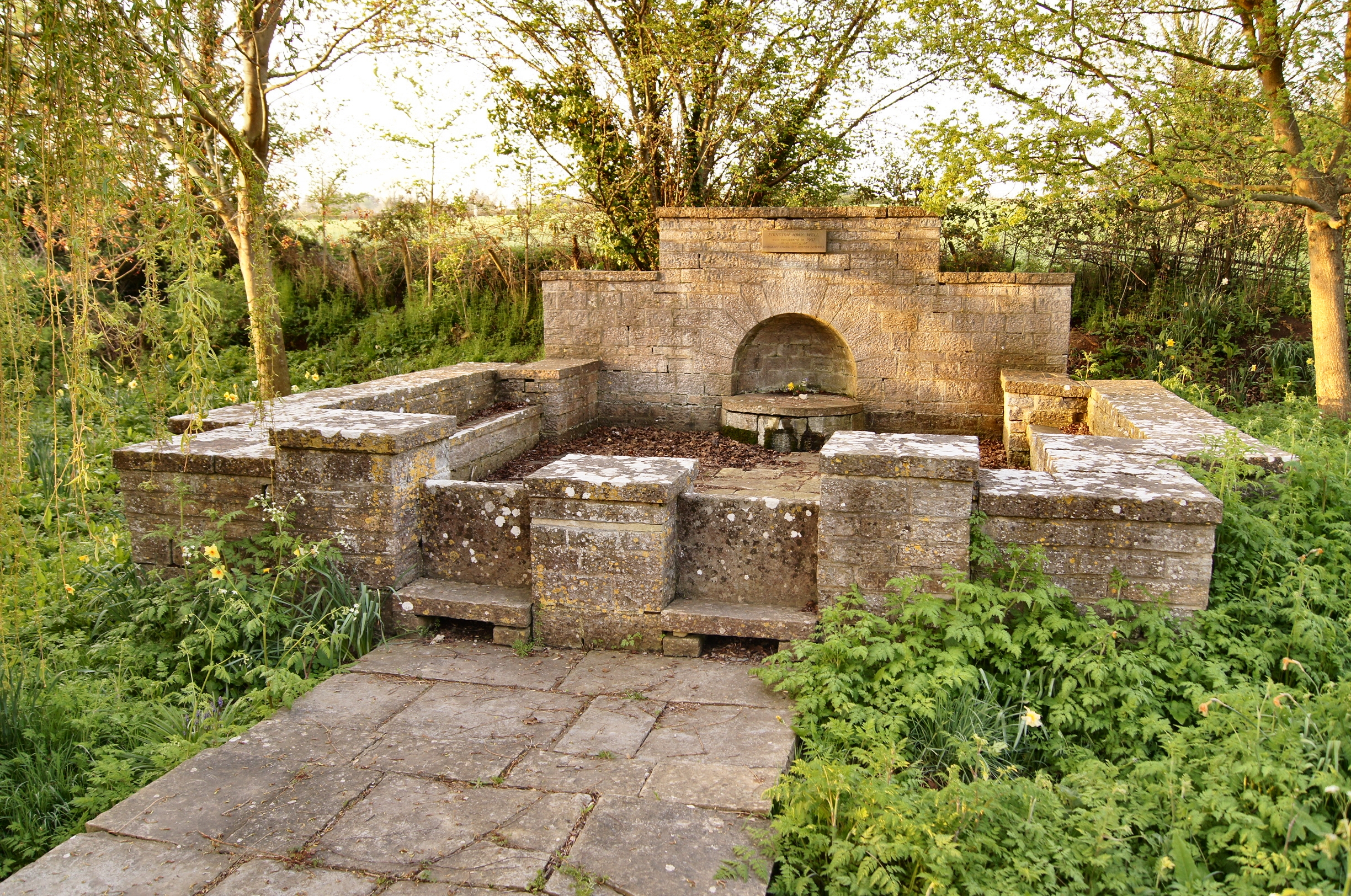
Holy Well, Edington

At the north end of the village is a Holy Well.

== History ==
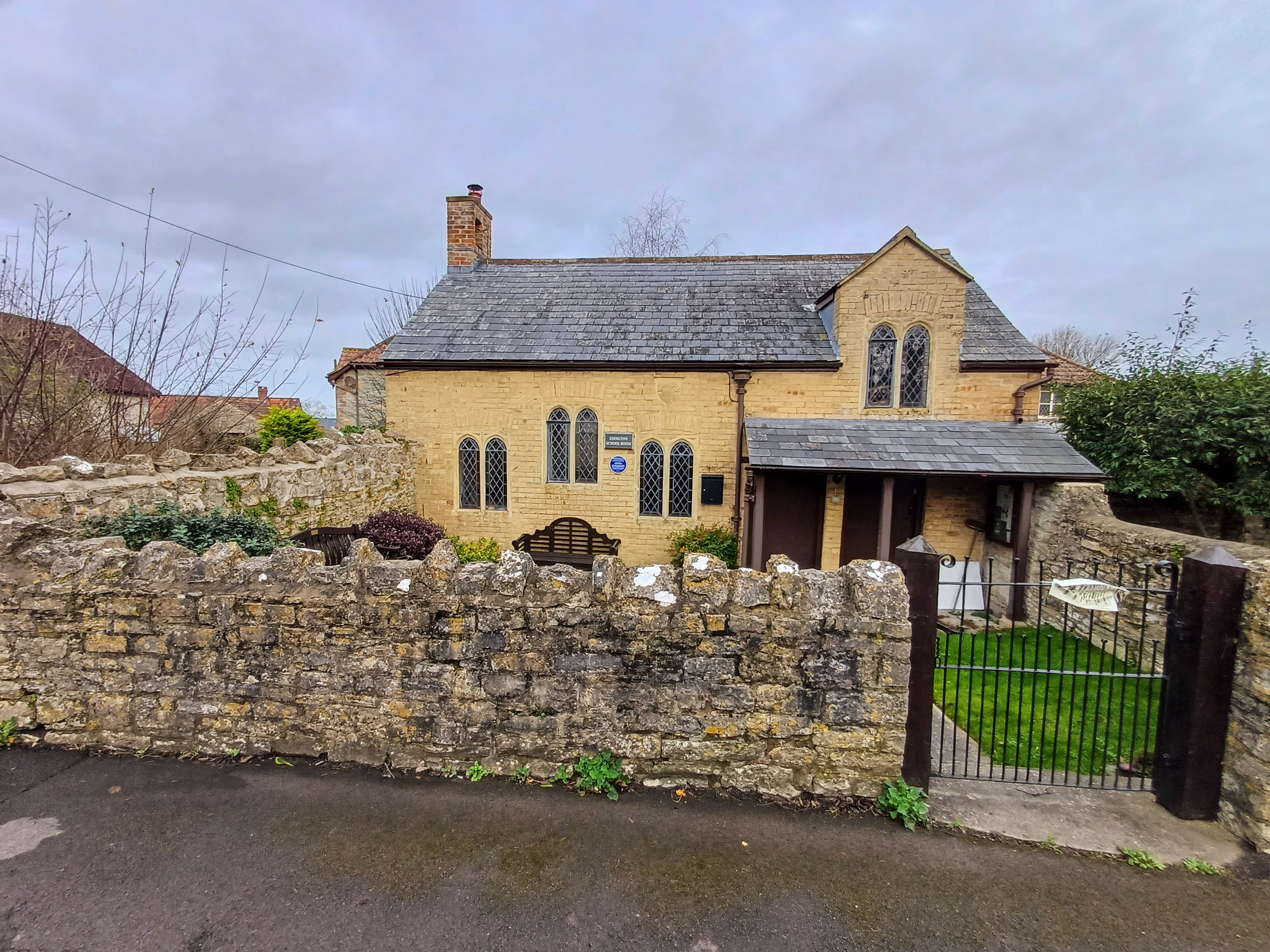
The Old Sunday School in Edington was founded in 1772 by Richard Field. The building now holds the village's local history archives.

The 1888-1913 Ordnance Survey map of Edington shows the site of a Roman pottery kiln. Bronze Age palstaves have also been found at a site near Edington.

Edington was located in the hundred of Whitley and the county of Somerset. In 1086, it had a recorded population of approximately 20.7 households.

Edington was once linked to the towns of Glastonbury and Burnham-on-Sea by the Somerset and Dorset Joint Railway and was later a junction for the short branch to Bridgwater, which opened in 1890. Edington railway station was known as Edington Junction between 1890 and 1953, changing to Edington Burtle on the closure of the Bridgwater line and closing on 7 March 1966.

== Governance ==
The parish council has responsibility for local issues.

For local government purposes, since 1 April 2023, the village comes under the unitary authority of Somerset Council. Before this, it was part of Bridgwater Rural District from 1894 to 1974, and then Sedgemoor district from 1974 to 2023.

== Geography ==
	Burtle
Chilton Polden	Edington	Catcott
Stawell	Sutton Mallet

Catcott, Edington and Chilton Moors SSSI is a 1,083 hectares (2,680 acres) biological Site of Special Scientific Interest managed by Somerset Wildlife Trust and is known for the variety of the bird life. The site consists of low-lying land south of the River Brue which floods on a regular basis; land north is included in the Tealham and Tadham Moors SSSI. The site includes the Catcott Lows national nature reserve, of grassland in the summer, but flood during the winter, creating a perfect habitat for wintering waterfowl and Bewick's swans, Roe deer and several invertebrate species of scientific interest also inhabit the area, Catcott Heath and Catcott North.

== Demographics ==
Census population of Edington parish
Census	Population	Female	Male	Households	Source
2001	337	178	159	138	
2011	372	201	171	151	
2021	373	199	174	153	

== Sources ==
- Railway information
