= Burtle =

Village in Somerset, England

Coordinates: 51.17°N 02.87°W

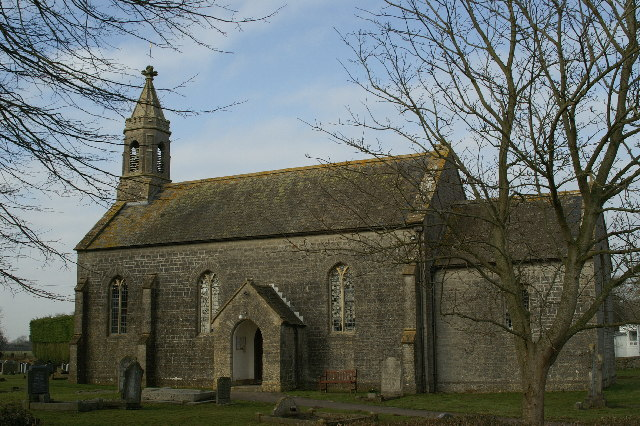
- St Philips & St James Church

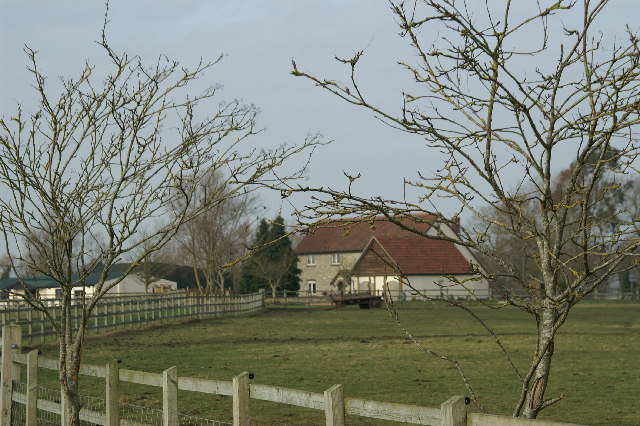
- Farmhouse, North of Burtle

- Location within Somerset
- Population: 388 (2011)
- OS grid reference: ST3942
- Unitary authority: Somerset Council
- Ceremonial county: Somerset
- Region: South West
- Country: England
- Sovereign state: United Kingdom
- Post town: Bridgwater
- Postcode district: TA7
- Dialling code: 01278
- Police: Avon and Somerset
- Fire: Devon and Somerset
- Ambulance: South Western
- UK Parliament: Wells and Mendip Hills

Burtle is a village and civil parish on the Somerset Levels in Somerset, England.

== History ==
Burtle Priory (also known as Burtle Moor Priory) originated as a hermitage on a site called Sprauellissmede, endowed by William son of Godfrey of Eddington in 1199. It was later known as St Stephens chapel and by 1312 a house of the Augustinian Canons Regular.

It is close to the village of Edington and between them was Edington Burtle station on a branch of the Somerset and Dorset Joint Railway, which opened in 1890 and closed on 7 March 1966.

== Governance ==
The parish council has responsibility for local issues, including setting an annual precept (local rate) to cover the council's operating costs and producing annual accounts for public scrutiny. The parish council evaluates local planning applications and works with the local police, district council officers, and neighbourhood watch groups on matters of crime, security, and traffic. The parish council's role also includes initiating projects for the maintenance and repair of parish facilities, as well as consulting with the district council on the maintenance, repair, and improvement of highways, drainage, footpaths, public transport, and street cleaning. Conservation matters (including trees and listed buildings) and environmental issues are also the responsibility of the council.

For local government purposes, since 1 April 2023, the village comes under the unitary authority of Somerset Council. Prior to this, it was part of the non-metropolitan district of Sedgemoor, which was formed on 1 April 1974 under the Local Government Act 1972, having previously been part of Bridgwater Rural District.

It is also part of the Wells and Mendip Hills constituency represented in the House of Commons of the Parliament of the United Kingdom. It elects one Member of Parliament (MP) by the first past the post system of election, and was part of the South West England constituency of the European Parliament prior to Britain leaving the European Union in January 2020, which elected seven MEPs using the d'Hondt method of party-list proportional representation.

== Educational and religious sites ==
The Anglican Church of St Philip and St James was built in 1838–1839 by Richard Carver, the County Architect and Surveyor.

Burtle was home to the lower school of Shapwick School, known as Shapwick Prep. The special school for children with dyslexia was established in 1974 by Colin Atkinson, a former cricketer for Somerset County Cricket Club and head of Millfield. Originally called the Chalice School, it was expanded and renamed to Edington Senior School in 1981, before merging with Shapwick Senior School. Shapwick School closed in 2020.
