= Charles Kemeys =

Charles Kemeys may refer to:

- Sir Charles Kemeys, 2nd Baronet (c. 1614–1658)
- Sir Charles Kemeys, 3rd Baronet (1651–1702), MP, son of the above
- Sir Charles Kemeys, 4th Baronet (1688–1735), MP for Glamorganshire, son of the above
