= Sir Halswell Tynte, 3rd Baronet =

English Tory politician

Sir Halswell Tynte, 3rd Baronet (15 November 1705 – 1730), of Halswell House, Goathurst, Somerset, was an English Tory politician who sat in the House of Commons from 1727 to 1730.

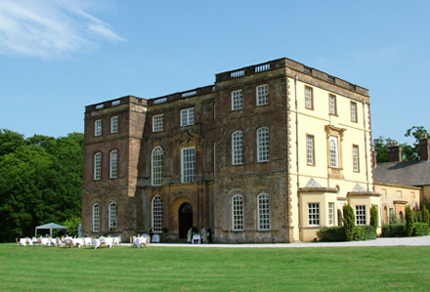
Halswell House

Tynte was born in 1705, he was the eldest son of Sir John Tynte, 2nd Baronet of Halswell, Somerset, and his wife Jane Kemys, daughter of Sir Charles Kemys, 3rd Baronet, MP of Cefn Mably, Glamorgan. He succeeded to the baronetcy in March 1710. On 1 March 1723, he matriculated at New College, Oxford. He married Mary Walters, daughter of John Walters of Brecon on 28 September 1727.

Tynte was returned unopposed as Tory Member of Parliament for Bridgwater at the 1727 general election in his family's interest. He voted consistently against the Administration.

Tynte died on 12 November 1730. He had two daughters, and was succeeded by his brother Rev. John Tynte and then by another brother Charles.

Parliament of Great Britain
Preceded by George Dodington; Thomas Palmer	Member of Parliament for Bridgwater; 1727–1730; With: George Dodington	Succeeded by George Dodington; Thomas Palmer
Baronetage of England
Preceded by John Tynte	Baronet (of Halswell); 1710-1730	Succeeded by John Tynte
