= Tynte baronets =

Extinct baronetcy in the Baronetage of England

There have been two baronetcies created for persons with the surname Tynte, one in the Baronetage of England and one in the Baronetage of Ireland. Both are extinct.

The Tynte Baronetcy of Halswell, Somerset, was created in the Baronetage of England for Halswell Tynte on 26 Jan 1674.

The Tynte Baronetcy of Dunlavin, County Wicklow was created in the Baronetage of Ireland for James Stratford Tynte on 24 August 1778. He was the only son of Robert Tynte and Lady Elizabeth Stratford, daughter of John Stratford, 1st Earl of Aldborough. He had one daughter but no male heir.

== Tynte family origins ==
One of the legends that surround the families who have lived in Halswell House is that of the first Tynte who, as a young knight of the Arundel Family, is said to have gone on the Third Crusade with King Richard the Lionheart. He was singled out for his bravery at the 1192 battle of Ascalon. The King observing him is supposed to have said:

" .. the maiden knight had borne himself like a lion, and had done work enough for six crusaders"

For which service to the Christian cause the King is said to have conferred on the young Knight his armorial bearings (Heraldic device), a lion argent on a field of gold between six crosslets of the first and the motto Tynctus Cruore Saraceno ("tinged with Saracen blood"). Examples of the Tynte family crest can be seen in the church of St Edwards in Goathurst, and the inn The Tynte Arms in nearby Enmore.

However, later historians have concluded that the Tyntes only rose from the yeomanry in the late 16th century (so would not have been entitled to have a coat of arms until then).

== Tynte baronets, of Halsewell, Somerset (1674) ==
- Sir Halswell Tynte, 1st Baronet (4 February 1649 – 9 Apr 1702) MP for Bridgwater 1679–89
- Sir John Tynte, 2nd Baronet (4 March 1683 – 16 March 1710)
- Sir Halswell Tynte, 3rd Baronet (15 Nov 1705 – 12 November 1730) MP for Bridgwater 1727–30
- Sir John Tynte, 4th Baronet (27 March 1707 – 15 August 1740)
- Sir Charles Kemys Tynte, 5th Baronet (19 May 1710 – 25 August 1785) MP for Monmouth 1745–47 and Somerset 1747–74.

== Tynte baronets, of Dunlaven, County Wicklow (1778) ==
Escutcheon of the Tynte baronets

- Sir James Stratford Tynte, 1st Baronet (August 1760 – 10 November 1785). Baronetcy extinct on his death.

== Anglo-Irish background ==
Sir Robert Tynte of Youghal and Ballycrenane was born in Wraxall, North Somerset, near Bristol. Possibly his interest in Ireland came through contact with Sir Walter Raleigh's close friend and cousin, Sir Arthur Gorges, whose family also came from Wraxhall.[36] He came to Munster as an Elizabethan soldier during the Desmond Rebellion. After the wars, he secured possession of the castle in Youghal from the Walshes, an affluent merchant family resident in Youghal since the 14th century who were dispossessed for supporting the Earl of Desmond. The castle gave him a firm foothold in the new economic infrastructure of Munster and he quickly worked his way up the administration, filling the office of High Sheriff from 1625 to 1626. As Youghal developed to serve the needs of the new colonists, so Tynte’s Castle provided an excellent base for storage and organization. During his lifetime, Tynte also acquired lands in the Barony of Imokilly, including the tower house at Ballycrenane, near Ladysbridge, County Cork.

A friend of Richard Boyle, 1st Earl of Cork, Tynte was married in 1612 to Richard Boyle's cousin Elizabeth (née Boyle), widow of Sir Edmund Spenser the poet. In time, Tynte's son Robert had two daughters, Catherine who married William Hyde of Carrigoneda, and Jane, who married Major Nicholas Pyne of Mogeely, son of the highly successful English settler Henry Pyne, and was the mother of Sir Richard Pyne, Lord Chief Justice of Ireland. Tynte's other son Henry would marry Sir Percy Smyth's eldest daughter, Mabel. Sir Robert Tynte outlived Henry by two years, dying in 1663. He was buried at Kilcredan graveyard, near Ladysbridge.

=== Mabel Smyth and Sir Henry Tynte ===
Mabel Smyth was the eldest daughter of Sir Percy Smyth by his first wife, Mary Meade, daughter of Robert Meade of Broghill. She married Sir Henry Tynte, MP for Youghal, eldest son of Sir Robert Tynte, the Somerset entrepreneur who owned Tynte’s Castle in Youghal. On 25 April 1661, Sir Henry was returned for County Cork, alongside the Hon. Richard Boyle, to the Irish Parliament. He died soon after this for, in a by-election of 2 June 1661, his seat was filled by Sir John Perceval, 1st Baronet, of Bruton. The Tynte family held the castle in Youghal until 1866 and, despite moving to Wicklow, remained interested in Youghal politics to such an extent that the Right Hon. Sir James Tynte of Old Bawn, Dublin and Dunlavin, Co. Wicklow was elected MP for Youghal in the early 18th century. He was born James Worth, younger son of William Worth (died 1721), Baron of the Court of Exchequer (Ireland) and his second wife Mabel Tynte, daughter of the abovementioned Sir Henry Tynte and Mabel Smyth. He took the Tynte name as a condition of receiving his inheritance. He was the grandfather of Sir James Stratford Tynte.
