= Temple of Harmony =

Folly in Goathurst, Somerset

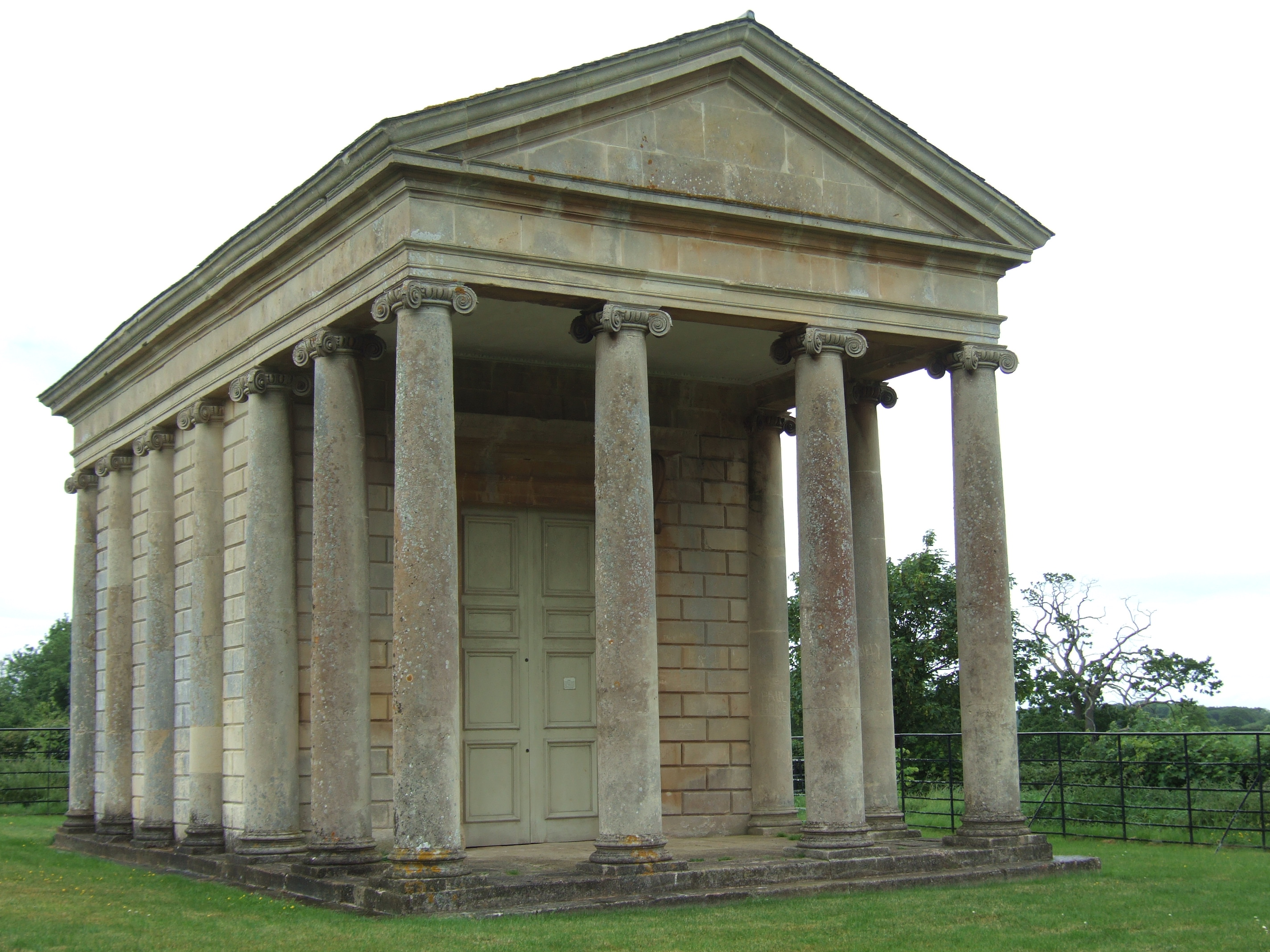
- The Temple of Harmony

- Location within Somerset

General information
- Location: Goathurst, England
- Coordinates: 51.102350°N 3.070529°W
- Construction started: 1767
- Client: Sir Charles Kemeys-Tynte

Design and construction
- Architect: Thomas Prowse

The Temple of Harmony is an 18th-century folly in the grounds of Halswell House, Goathurst, Somerset, England. Built in 1767, it is a replica of the 1st-century Temple of Fortuna Virilis in Rome. The Temple stands in Mill Wood, a 17-acre (7 ha) pleasure garden in the grounds of Halswell House, and was built for Sir Charles Kemeys-Tynte in 1767 to designs by Thomas Prowse, with features by Robert Adam and Thomas Stocking. The Temple was dedicated to the memory of a mutual friend, Peregrine Palmer, formerly MP for Oxford University (d 1762).

The Temple has a slate roof and pedimental end gables, and is surrounded with Ionic columns and pilasters. It is aligned north-west/south-east, with the portico at the south-east end, facing Halswell House which lies some 470 metres (510 yards) distant. The Somerset Buildings Preservation Trust (SBPT) acquired the Temple in 1993 in a derelict condition, having been used for many years as a cattle shelter. It has now been restored, with grants from English Heritage and others, and is a Grade II* listed building. Its dimensions at its base are approximately 6.4 by 11.3 metres (21 by 37 ft), and it now has the addition of a tie bar, a long retaining bolt that runs through the structure from one side to the other, helping to keep it together.

John Walsh's marble statue in the temple depicting Terpsichore, the Muse of joy in the dance and lyric poetry, was dedicated to the memory of Thomas Prowse after his death in 1767. This was copied in 1999 and the copy is now located here. The original is in the Museum of Somerset, Taunton.

The Temple was owned by the Somerset Building Preservation Trust and managed by the Halswell Park Trust for a number of years. In 2020 it was purchased by Edward Strachan, the owner of Halswell House and the surrounding land known as Mill Wood, thus restoring it to its rightful position in the surrounding parkland.

The Temple can be visited on Sunday afternoons during the summer months and at other times by prior arrangement.

== Gallery ==
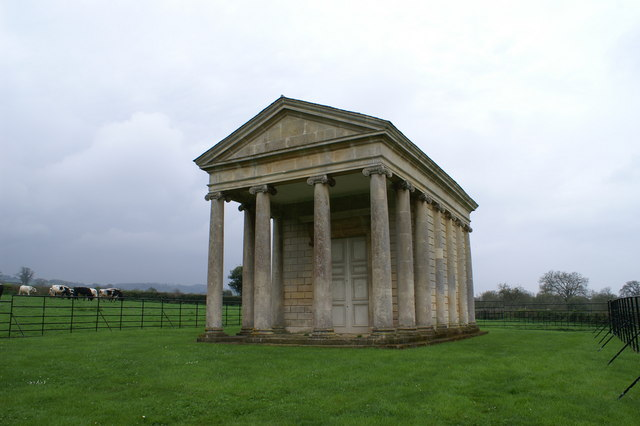
South-east facade with portico

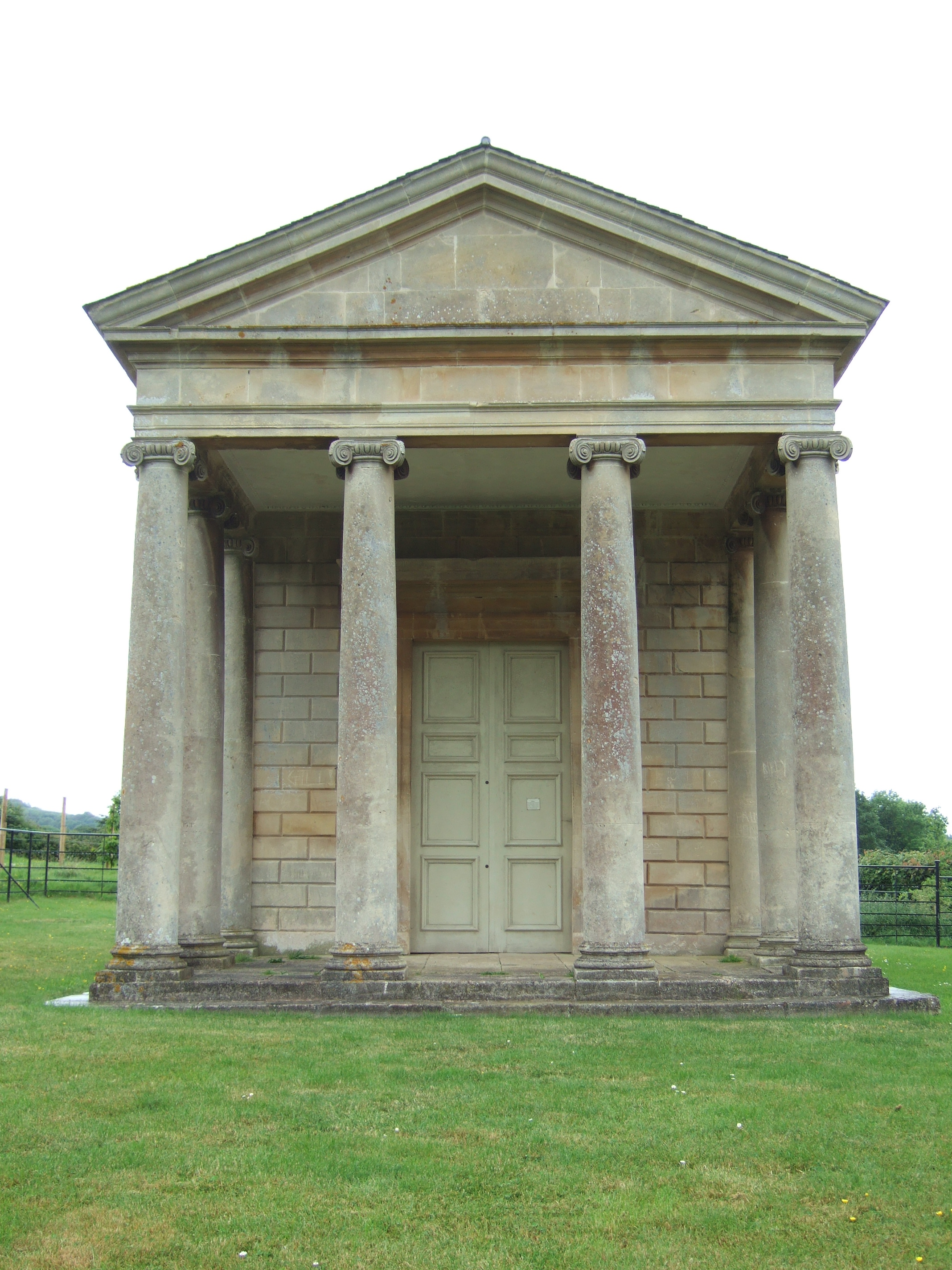
South-east facade with portico

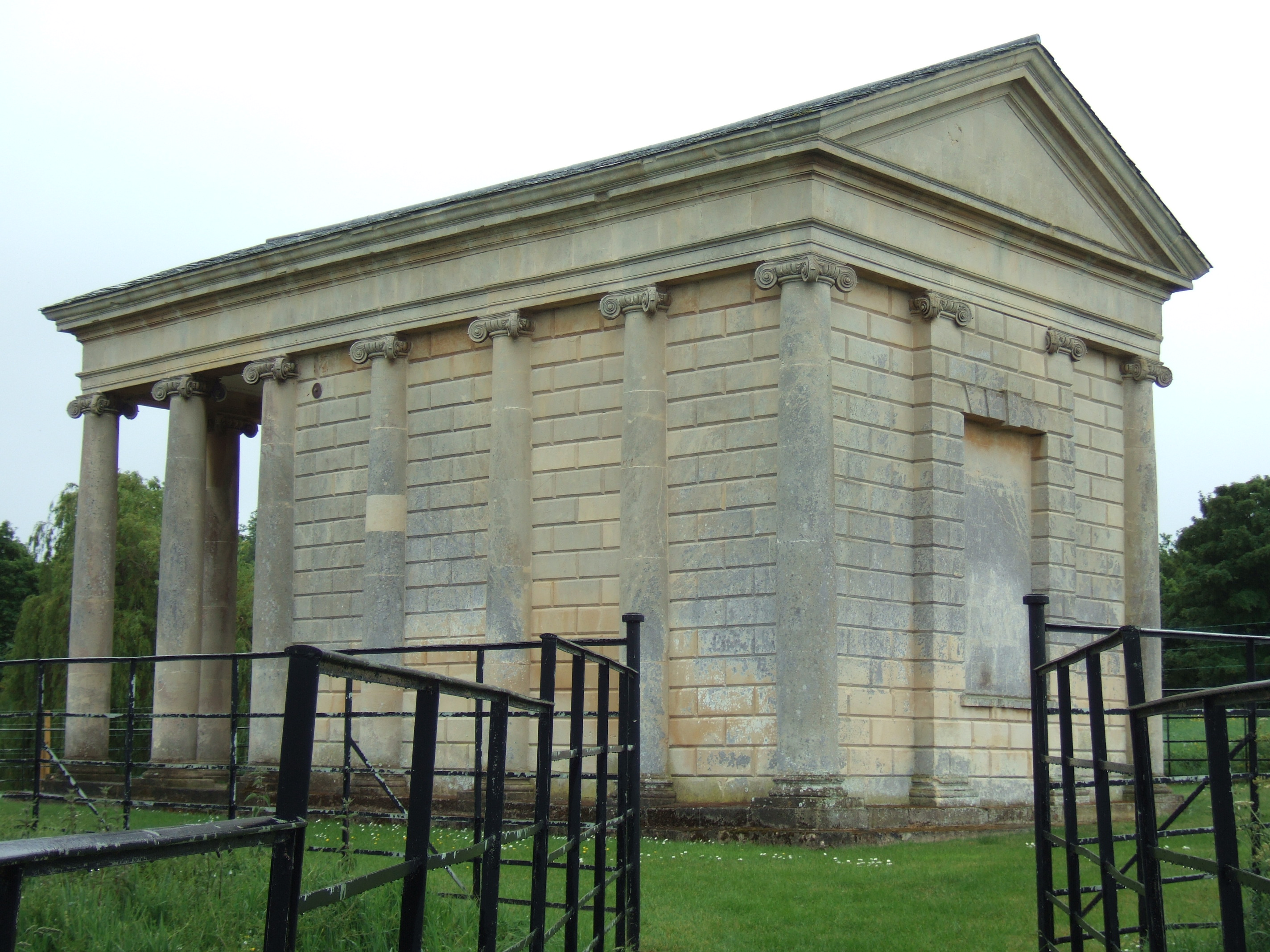
North-east facade (long side) and north-west facade with blind window

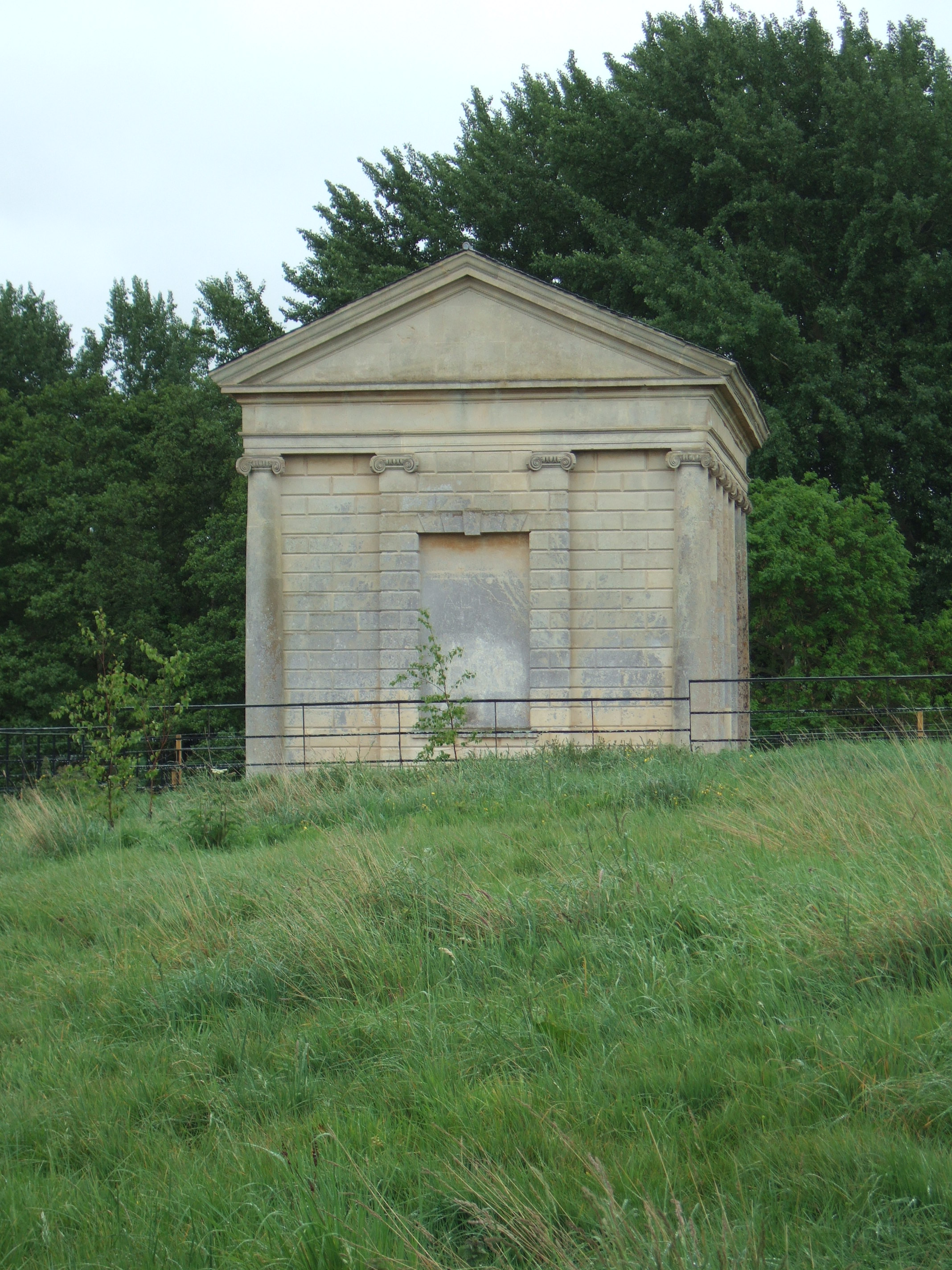
North-west facade

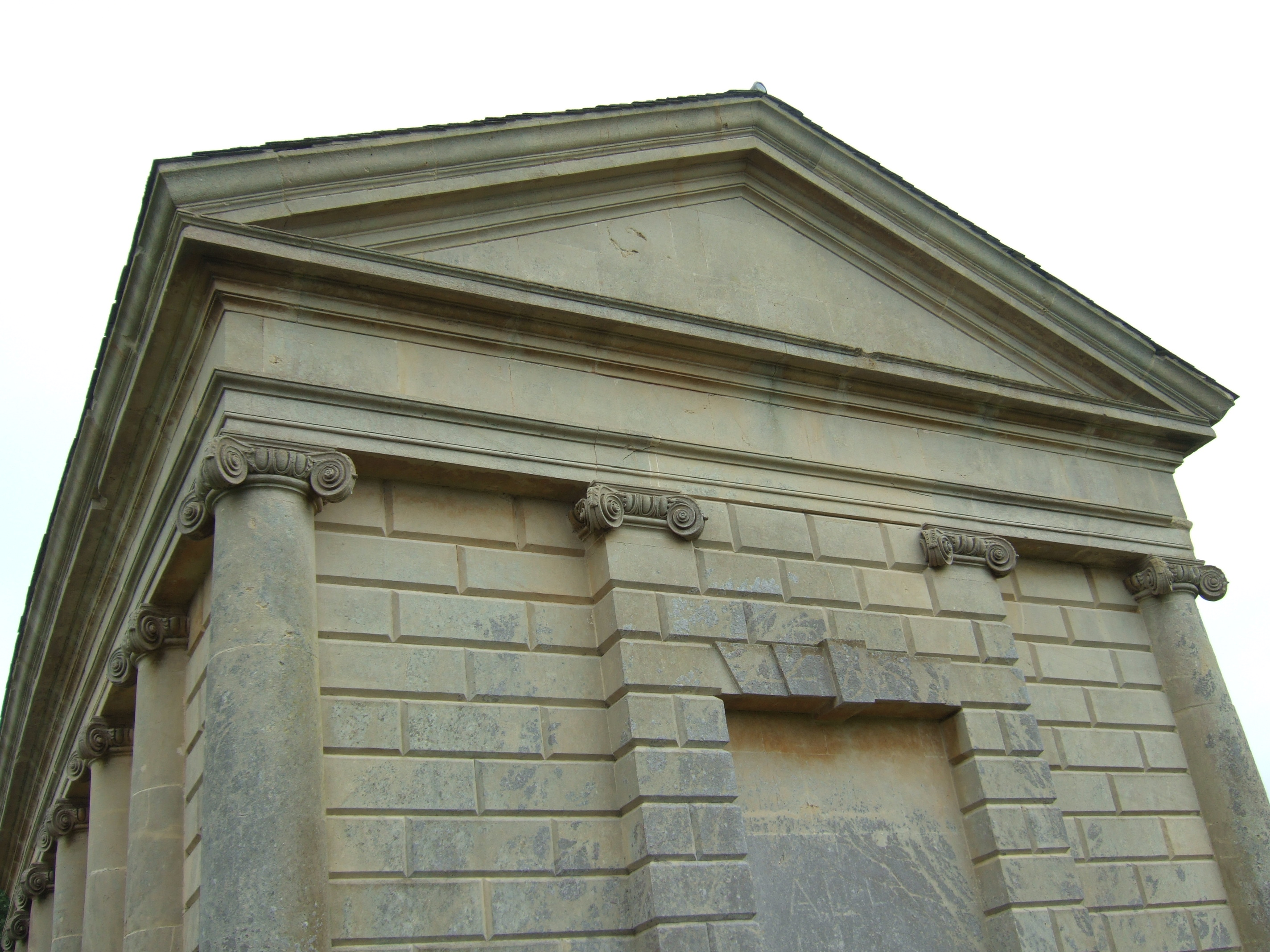
Detail of north-west facade

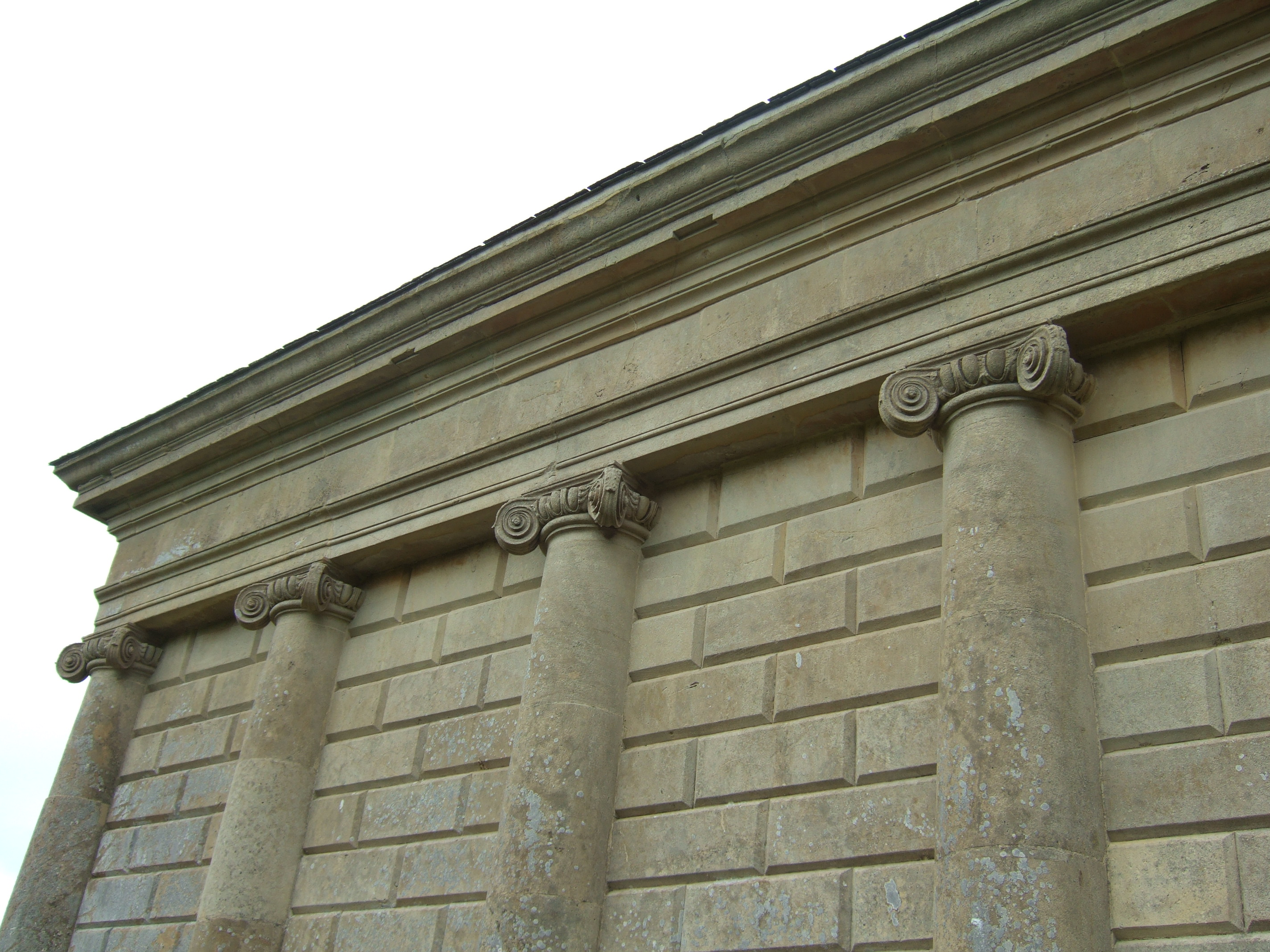
Detail of south-west facade (long side)

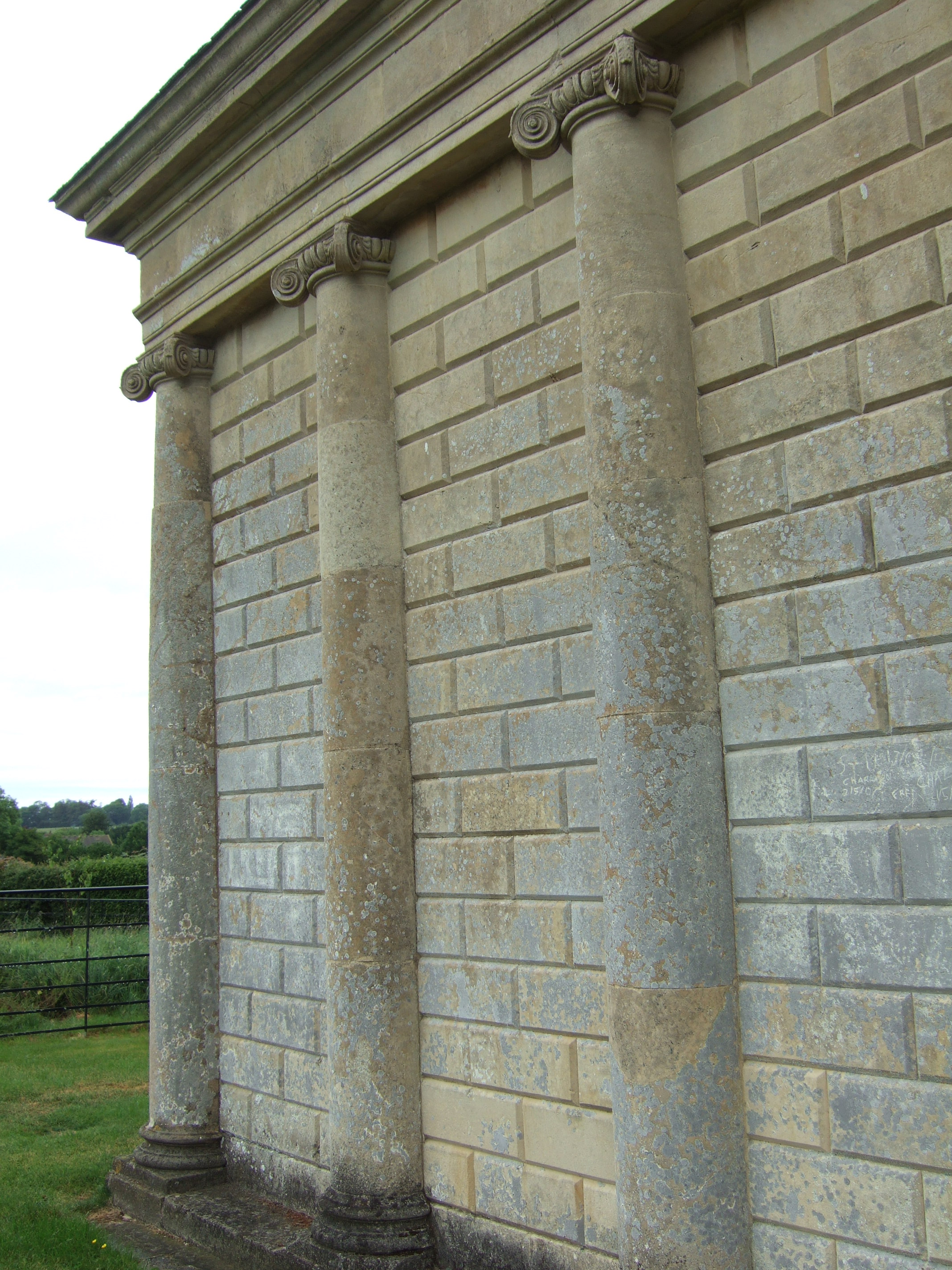
Detail of south-west facade (long side)

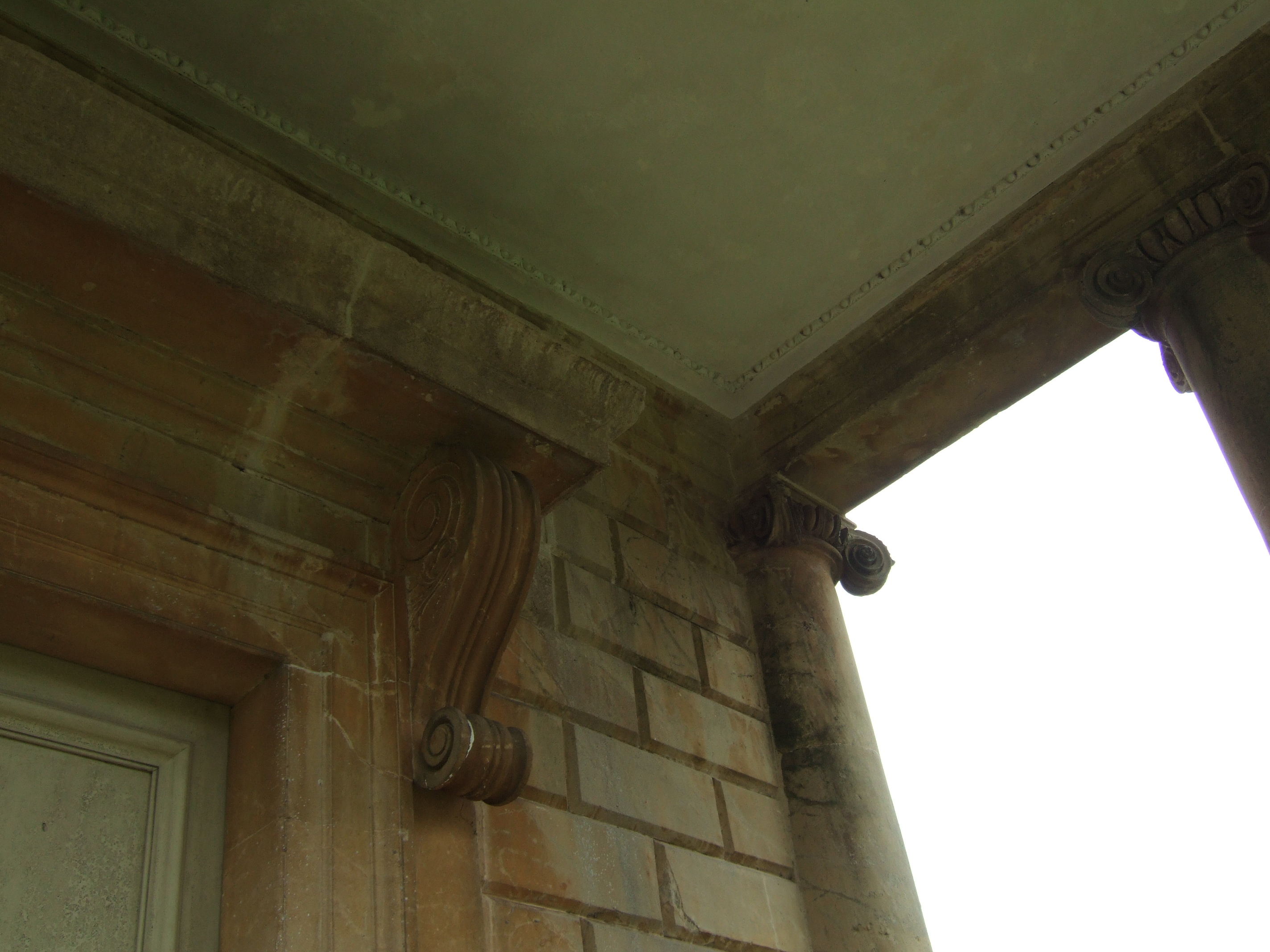
Detail of inside of portico

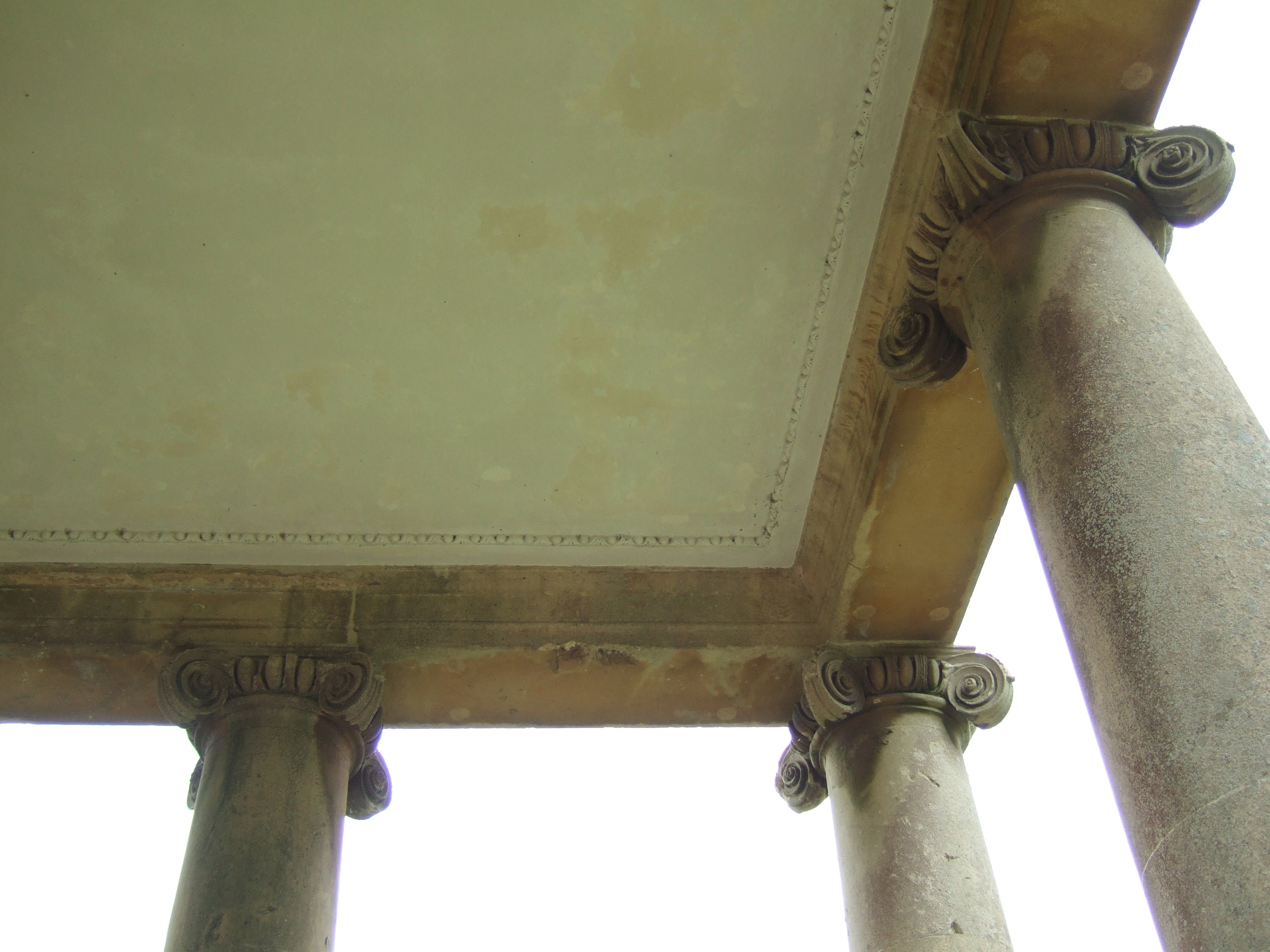
Detail of inside of portico

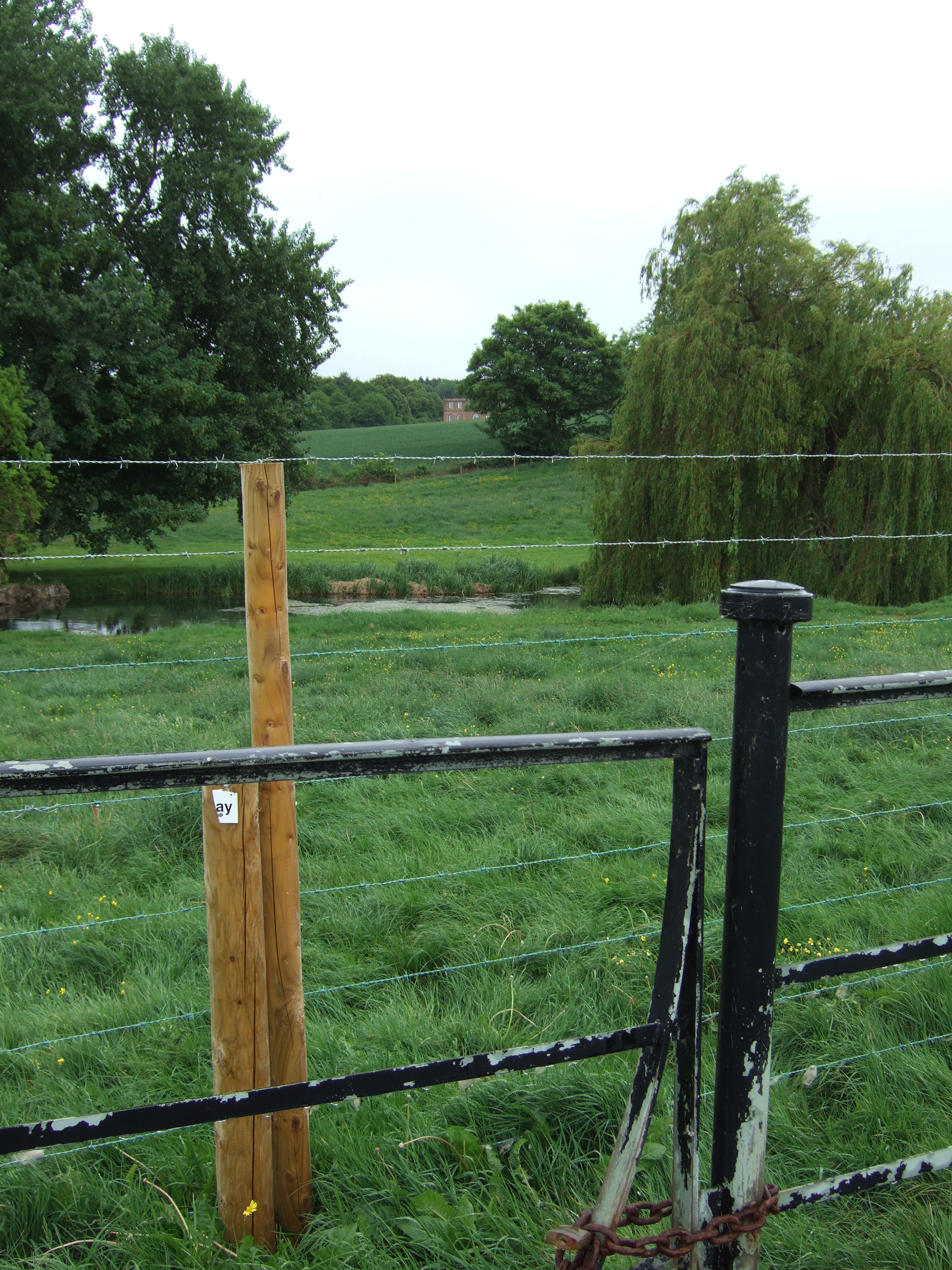
View of Halswell House from the Temple
