= Halswell Tynte =

Halswell Tynte may refer to:

- Sir Halswell Tynte, 1st Baronet (1649–1702) MP for Bridgwater
- Sir Halswell Tynte, 3rd Baronet (1705-1730) MP for Bridgwater
