= Kemeys =

Kemeys may refer to:

- Edward Kemeys (1843–1907), American sculptor
- Edward Kemeys (MP), (died 1623), Welsh MP for Monmouthshire, 1593
- Nicholas Kemeys (died 1648), Welsh landowner and soldier
- Kemeys Baronets
- Kemeys Commander, village in Monmouthshire, Wales
- Kemeys Inferior, parish in Newport, Wales

== See also ==
- Kemys
