= Cefn Mably House =

Mansion in Cefn Mably, Caerphilly County Borough, Wales

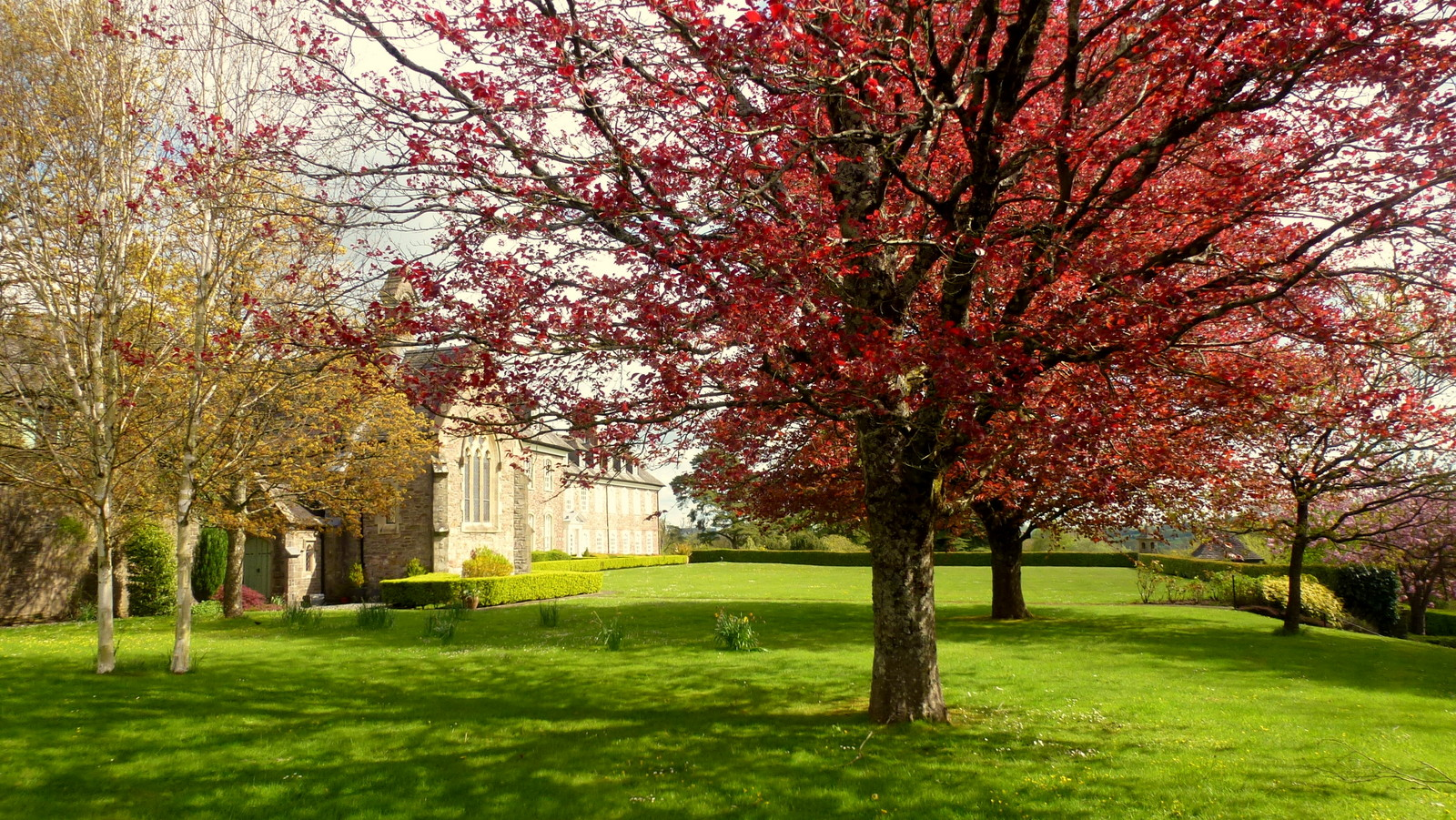
- Cefn Mably in springtime

- Location within Caerphilly

General information
- Architectural style: Tudor style
- Location: Cefn Mably, Cardiff, Wales
- Coordinates: 51.555°N 3.118°W
- Construction started: 12th century

Cefn Mably House (Welsh: Ty Cefn Mabli) is a mansion situated in Cefn Mably, Caerphilly County Borough, Wales. It is a Grade II listed building. The gardens surrounding the house are listed on the Cadw/ICOMOS Register of Parks and Gardens of Special Historic Interest in Wales.

== History ==
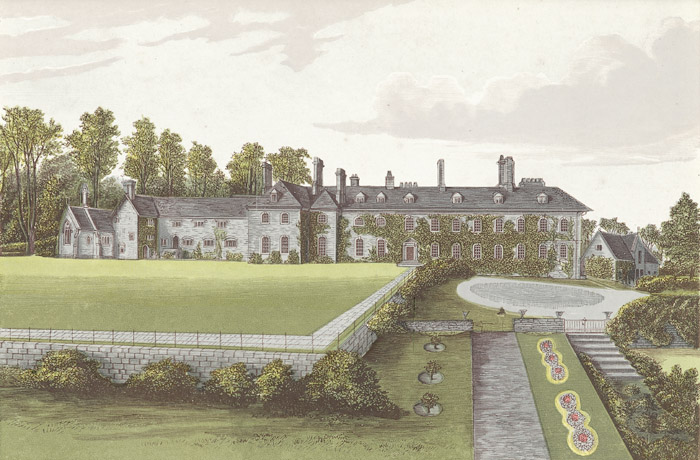
Cefn Mably mansion ca. 1860

A house of some sort stood on the site in the early 12th century and this was largely rebuilt by Edward Kemeys, High Sheriff of Glamorgan, in the Tudor style in the late 16th century. The east wing was subsequently rebuilt in the Georgian style from 1688. It was described by the Cardiff Times in 1893 as one of the finest and most historic country seats in Wales". It was inherited by Sir Charles Kemeys Tynte in the mid 18th century and then acquired by Courtenay Morgan, 1st Viscount Tredegar in 1920.

Courtenay Morgan made the building available to the local health board at a subsidised rate and it opened as a tuberculosis sanatorium with 112 patients in 1924. It joined the National Health Service in 1948 and, subsequently, became a geriatric hospital, before closing in the early 1980s.

The building was badly damaged in a fire in 1994 and subsequently became derelict. In 1998 the heritage organisation, SAVE Britain's Heritage, described it as "a beautiful house that has been so brutally vandalised it has now become the local fly tip." In the early 2000s it was restored and converted into apartments. The gardens surrounding the house are listed at Grade II on the Cadw/ICOMOS Register of Parks and Gardens of Special Historic Interest in Wales.
