= Sir Halswell Tynte, 1st Baronet =

English landowner and politician

Sir Halswell Tynte, 1st Baronet (1649–1702) of Halswell House, Goathurst, Somerset, was an English landowner and politician who sat in the House of Commons from 1679 to 1685.

== Early life ==
Tynte was baptized on 4 February 1649, the only son of John Tynte and his wife Jane Halswell, daughter of Hugh Halswell of Halswell, Goathurst. He matriculated at Hart Hall, Oxford in 1666. His father died in 1669 and he succeeded to the estates. In 1671, he was admitted at Middle Temple. He married Grace Fortescue (buried 22 March 1694), daughter of Robert Fortescue of Buckland Filleigh, Devon, under a settlement dated 6 February 1671. In 1672, he succeeded to the Halswell estates of his grandfather Hugh Halswell.

== Career ==
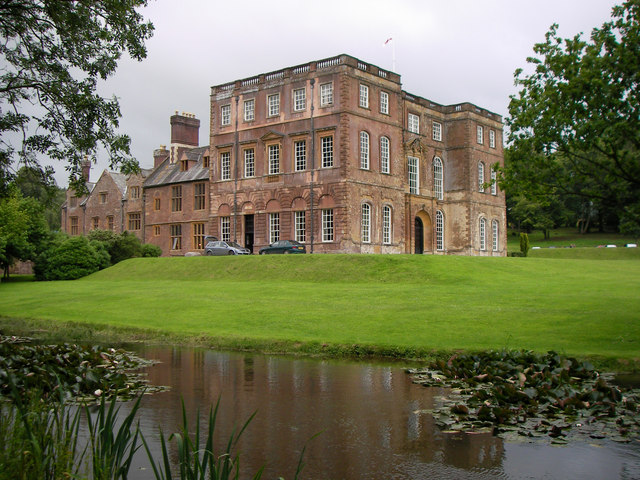
Halswell House

Tynte was appointed Deputy Lieutenant for Somerset in about 1672 and JP and commissioner for assessment in 1673. He was created baronet on 26 January 1674. From 1674 to 1675 he was High Sheriff of Somerset. He was also a Commissioner for Recusants in 1675. By 1679 he was Colonel of the Somerset Militia. At the first general election of 1679, he was caught up in a double return at Bridgwater, but was returned as Member of Parliament for the borough then and in the second election in October 1679. He was appointed to committees to consider bills to speed up the conviction of recusants and for security against Popery, and to investigate abuses in the Post Office. He voted against exclusion, but was not recorded as speaking. In 1680 he ceased to be Commissioner for Assessment. He was re-elected MP for Bridgwater in 1681 but also in 1681 ceased to be Deputy Lieutenant for Somerset. He lost his seat on the bench in 1683 but it was restored in 1684. Also in 1684, he was deprived of his militia regiment. In 1685, he was re-elected MP for Bridgwater against strong Tory opposition. In the Parliament of King James II, he was named only to the committees to prevent the export of wool and to encourage woollen manufacture. During the Revolution of 1688, seven of his horses were seized by the Dutch. In 1689, he became Commissioner for Assessment again until 1690, and Deputy Lieutenant until 1691.He was not reappointed to the lieutenancy in 1691, and two years later lost his seat on the bench as a non-juror.

== Death and legacy ==
Tynte was buried at Goathurst on 7 April 1702. He had four sons, of whom two survived him, and three daughters. He was succeeded in the baronetcy by his son John. His grandson, another Halswell Tynte, sat for Bridgwater as a Tory from 1727 to 1730.

Parliament of Great Britain
Preceded by Edmund Wyndham; Peregrine Palmer	Member of Parliament for Bridgwater; 1679–1689; With: Sir Francis Rolle 1679; Ralph Stawell 1679-1681; Sir John Malet 1681-1685; Sir Francis Warre 1685-1689	Succeeded by Henry Bull; Sir Francis Warre
Baronetage of England
New creation	Baronet (of Halswell); 1674-1702	Succeeded by John Tynte
