= Kemys =

Kemys is a surname. Notable people with the surname include:

- Lawrence Kemys (died 1618), a seaman and companion of Sir Walter Raleigh
- Edward Kemys (c. 1693 – 1736), Member of the Parliament of Great Britain

Notable people with the forename Kemys include:

- John Kemys Spencer-Churchill (1835 – 1913),

== See also ==
- Kemeys
