= Halswell House =

Country house in Sedgemoor, UK

Coordinates: 51.0985°N 3.0668°W

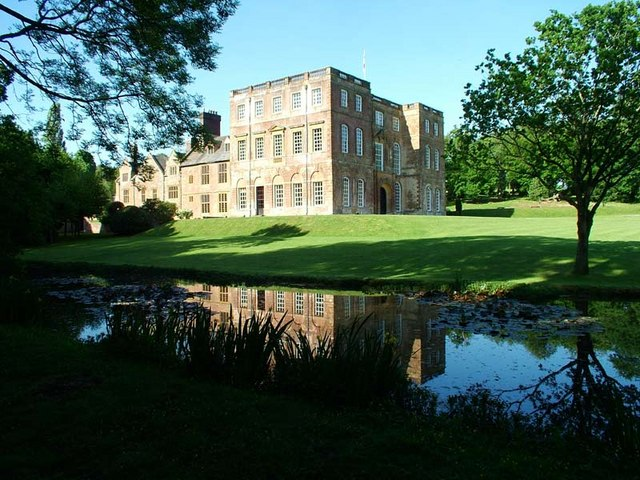
Halswell House

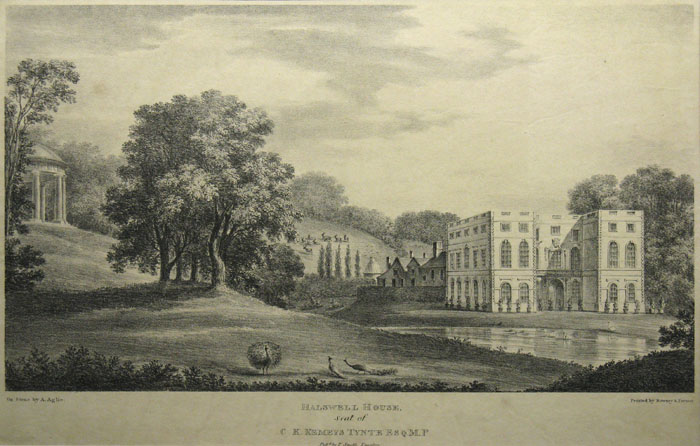
Halswell House painted by Agostino Aglio circa 1830

Halswell House is a Grade I listed country house in Goathurst, Somerset, England.

== Descent ==
=== Domesday Book ===
The Domesday Book of 1086 lists the holder of the manor of Halswell as Roger Arundel, whose tenant was Wido. It descended from Roger to Henry de Newburgh, whose tenant in 1285 was Taunton Priory.

=== de Halswell ===
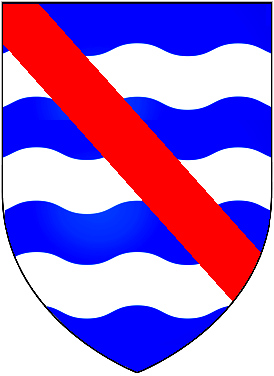
Arms of Halswell: Azure, three bars wavy argent over all a bend gules

Peter de Halswell was the holder in 1285, and held by the feudal tenure of 1/4 of a knight's fee. William de Halswell held the manor in 1303 as 1/8 of a knight's fee. William Halswell was living in 1394 and appears to have been the holder in 1428. The descent is uncertain thereafter until Nicholas Halswell (c.1512-1564), MP for Bridgwater in 1553 and 1563, the son of John Halswell by his wife Mary Est. Nicholas' son by his wife Margery Tremayle (d.1573) was Robert Halswell (d.1570), who built Halswell House, whose eldest son by his wife Susan Brouncker (daughter of Henry Brouncker of Melksham, Wiltshire, Sheriff of Wiltshire) was Sir Nicholas Halswell (1566–1633), MP for Bridgwater in 1604. His eldest son Robert Halswell (d.1626), MP for Bridgwater in 1614, predeceased him, and thus Sir Nicholas's heir was his eldest surviving son Henry Halswell (d.1636). Sir Nicholas had settled much of his property, including Halswell, onto Henry in 1628 in order to escape his creditors. Henry died unmarried and without progeny when his heir became his brother Rev. Hugh Halswell (d. 1672), rector of Cheriton, Hampshire and proctor of Oxford University, who left a sole daughter Jane Halswell (d.1650) his sole heiress. Jane married John Tynte of Chelvey Court, Brockley, Somerset, and left a son Sir Halswell Tynte, 1st Baronet (d.1702), whose inheritance became the manor of Halswell.

=== Tynte ===
In 1667 the manor was put into trust for Jane Halswell's son Sir Halswell Tynte, 1st Baronet (1649–1702), MP for Bridgwater 1679–1689. Rev. Sir John Tynte, 2nd Baronet (1683–1710), rector of Goathurst, married Jane Kemeys of the Kemeys family of Cefn Mably. He was succeeded successively by his three sons: Sir Halsewell Tynte, 3rd Baronet (1705–30), of Halswell and Cefnmabli, whose two daughters died young; Rev. Sir John Tynte, 4th Baronet (1707–1740), also rector of Goathurst, who died unmarried and Sir Charles Kemys Tynte, 5th Baronet (1710–1785), who died without progeny leaving Halswell to a niece who adopted the name Kemys Tynte. Cefn Mably remained in the hands of the Kemeys Tynte family until 1923.

In 1916 the Kemeys-Tynte's reclaimed the dormant Barony of Wharton through petition to the House of Lords. The Halswell estate was finally sold by Lord Wharton and broken up through as series of auctions between 1948 and 1950. The estate buildings and much of the Tudor manor were subdivided into flats, probably saving the house from the destruction that was sweeping through other historic houses from that time until the 1970s. The Baroque house, too large and draughty for such habitation was left untouched and used as a warehouse. The bulk of the house was bought by a succession of owners who attempted to reunite the fragmented ownership of the estate, the last was a property developer and hotelier who bought Halswell in 2004 and went bankrupt in 2012.

=== Strachan ===
British businessman and art collector Edward Strachan bought the estate in 2013 and has begun a comprehensive process of restoration of the house, outbuildings, gardens and eighteenth-century landscape parkland with the intention of opening the house to the public when the restorations are complete. By the end of 2013 the derelict eighteenth-century lake system called Mill Wood, containing follies, bridges, dams and waterfalls was purchased by the same owner and reunited with the house for the first time since the estate was broken up in 1950. This has been re-planted with trees and the follies are being restored.

== Parkland ==
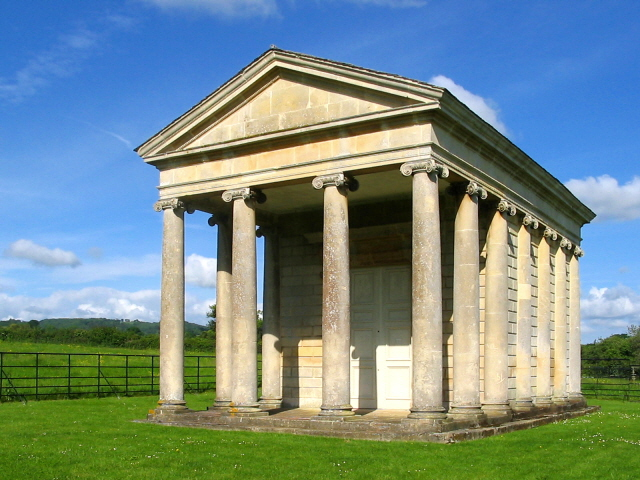
Temple of Harmony

Halswell Park was developed between 1745 and 1785 as a setting for Halswell House. The 17-acre (69,000 m^{2}) pleasure garden was created by Sir Charles Kemeys Tynte, and ranks in importance with some of the finest landscape gardens in Europe. In 1740 the grounds covered 30 acres (12 ha) but this had been expanded to 132 acres (53 ha) by 1800. It included tree plantations and avenues with a canal later converted into a lake. The park, which is listed, Grade II, on the Register of Historic Parks and Gardens of special historic interest in England, is on the Heritage at Risk Register.

The grounds contain many fanciful buildings, fish ponds, cascades and bridges, including the Temple of Harmony which stands in Mill Wood. Completed in 1767, it is Grade II listed and has been fully restored. It is open to the public on Sundays from May until September.

== Sale and dispersal ==
The contents of the house were sold in 1948, and the house itself in 1950 when the rest of the estate was auctioned off. Part of the house was converted into flats. The Halswell Park Trust was established with the aim of acquiring the buildings and surrounding land of Halswell Park, restoring them and opening them to the public. In 1998, the Somerset Buildings Preservation Trust restored Robin Hood's Hut (Grade II), which has views over Somerset, the Bristol Channel and South Wales. Robin Hood's Hut is now owned by the Landmark Trust, who let the building on short holiday leases. In December 2006, the rock band Radiohead used the house to record part of their album In Rainbows.

== See also ==
- List of POW camps in Britain
- Tynte baronets
