= Thomas Palmer (died 1735) =

British lawyer and Tory politician

Thomas Palmer, FRS (fl. 1700–1735) of Fairfield Stoke Coursey, was a British lawyer and Tory politician who sat in the House of Commons between 1715 and 1735.

Palmer was the son of Nathaniel Palmer, MP of Fairfield, Stoke Coursey, Somerset, and his wife, Frances Wyndham, daughter of Sir William Wyndham, 1st Baronet. He matriculated at New College, Oxford in 1700 and then entered the Middle Temple in 1702. He married Elizabeth Wroth, daughter of Sir Thomas Wroth, 3rd Baronet, MP of Petherton Park, near Bridgwater Somerset.

Palmer was returned unopposed as Member of Parliament for Bridgwater, Somerset at the 1715 general election and was elected at a contest in 1722. In 1725, he was involved in the impeachment of Thomas Parker, 1st Earl of Macclesfield. He did not stand in the 1727 general election. He was returned for Bridgwater again at a by-election on 5 February 1731 and elected in a contest at 1734 general election, sitting until his death in 1735.

Palmer was Recorder of Bridgwater from 1720 until 1734 and was elected a Fellow of the Royal Society in May 1726.

Palmer died of an unknown illness and left directions for his body to be autopsied so that "the calamitous illness which I have been so long afflicted with, and to which all the persons I have applied to have been unable to find the cause or the cure, may after my death be of use to some other unhappy persons who may be in the same condition, and may be helped by the knowledge." He had no children and left all his property to his wife.

Parliament of Great Britain
Preceded by Nathaniel Palmer; John Rolle	Member of Parliament for Bridgewater; 1715–1727; With: George Dodington 1715–1720; William Pitt 1720–1722; George Dodington 1722–1727	Succeeded by Sir Halswell Tynte; George Dodington
Preceded by Sir Halswell Tynte; George Dodington	Member of Parliament for Bridgewater; 1731–1735; With: George Dodington	Succeeded by Charles Wyndham; George Dodington
