= Sir Charles Kemeys, 4th Baronet =

British Tory politician (1688–1735)

Sir Charles Kemeys, 4th Baronet (1688–1735) was a British Tory politician who sat in the House of Commons between 1713 and 1734.

== Early life ==
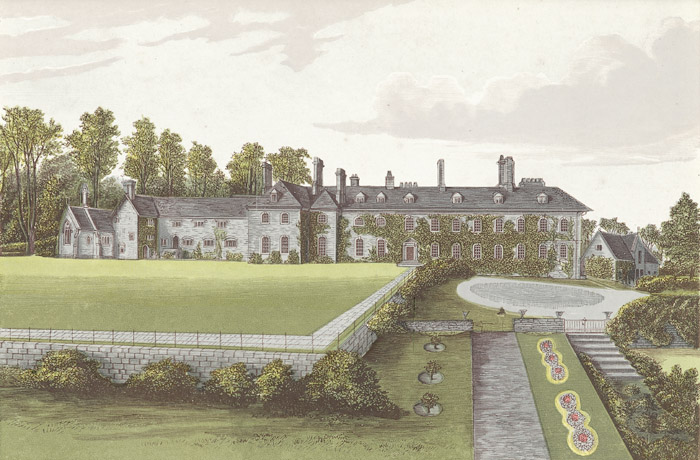
Cefn Mably mansion ca. 1860

Kemeys was born on 23 November 1688, the only son of Sir Charles Kemeys, 3rd Baronet of Cefn Mably and his first wife Mary Wharton, daughter of Philip Wharton, 4th Baron Wharton. His father died in December 1702 and he succeeded to his father's estates and the baronetcy. His maternal uncle Thomas Wharton, 1st Marquess of Wharton and two Tory MPs Robert Price and Thomas Edwards were his guardians. He was admitted at Trinity College, Cambridge in May 1706 but abandoned his studies and decided to tour Europe. In the course of his travels he met and became a friend of the Elector of Hanover – later King George I.

== Political career ==
Kemeys contested Appleby on his uncle's interest at the 1710 election but was defeated. He was High Sheriff of Glamorganshire from 1712 to 1713. At the 1713 general election, he was returned as Member of Parliament for Monmouthshire with the support of Henry Somerset, 2nd Duke of Beaufort.

Kemeys was a strong Jacobite, despite being a friend of King George before his accession and nephew to the Whig leader, Lord Wharton. He did not stand in 1715, but was returned unopposed for Glamorganshire at a by-election on 22 February 1716. He was again returned unopposed in 1722 and 1727. He decided to retire at the 1734 general election on grounds of ill-health.

== Death and legacy ==
Kemeys died unmarried on 29 January 1735. His estate passed to his sister, who married Sir John Tynte, 2nd Baronet of Halswell, Somerset. Their son Sir Charles Tynte, 5th Baronet was Tory MP for Monmouthshire and Somerset.

Parliament of Great Britain
Preceded by Thomas Lewis; John Morgan	Member of Parliament for Monmouthshire; 1713–1715; With: John Morgan	Succeeded by Thomas Lewis; John Morgan
Preceded by Robert Jones	Member of Parliament for Glamorganshire; 1716–1734	Succeeded by William Talbot
Baronetage of England
Preceded by Charles Kemeys	Baronet (of Kevanmabley); 1702-1735	Extinct
