= Nicholas Kemeys =

English politician

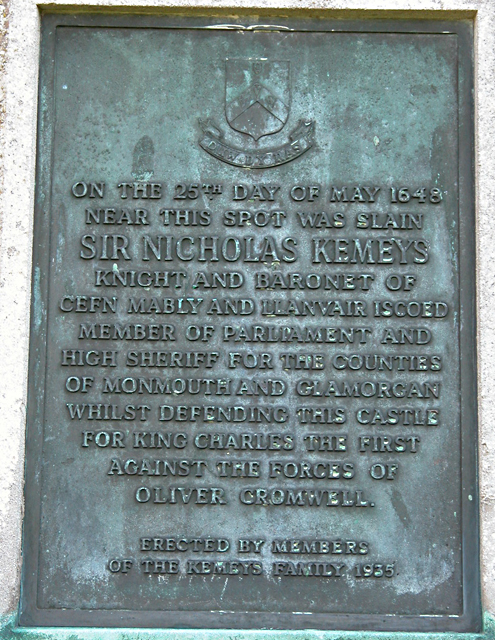
Plaque commemorating Nicholas Kemeys at Chepstow Castle

Sir Nicholas Kemeys, 1st Baronet (before 1593 – 25 May 1648) was a Welsh landowner and soldier during the English Civil War in South Wales.

== Lineage ==
The family claimed descent from a Stephen de Kemeys who held lands in the southern Welsh Marches, in Monmouthshire in the 1230s. A David Kemeys, the son of Ievan Kemeys of Began (near St Mellons) married Cecil, a daughter of Llewelyn ab Evan ab Llewelyn ap Cynfig of Cefn Mably in or around 1450.

David was succeeded by his son, Lewis Kemeys and his son and heir in turn was John Kemeys, succeeded by his son, also named David (possibly born 1564). David's eldest son Edward Kemeys, High Sheriff of Glamorganshire for 1574, died without issue and the estate passed to a nephew, another David Kemeys, the son of Rhys Kemeys of Llanvair Castle (Llanvair Discoed), who also became Sheriff of Glamorgan for 1616. He was succeeded by his son Edward who had no issue and the estate therefore passed to Nicholas Kemeys, the third son of Rhys Kemeys.

== Biography ==
Nicholas Kemeys was MP for Monmouthshire 1628 to 1629 and High Sheriff of Monmouthshire for 1631 and Sheriff of Glamorganshire for 1638. At the outbreak of the English Civil War he was created a Baronet by King Charles I of England.

He was a passionate supporter of the King and monarchy and as Custos Rotulorum of Monmouthshire played a leading and high-profile part in Monmouthshire during the Civil War. He was appointed Governor of Cardiff castle. As an ally of Sir Trevor Williams, 1st Baronet of Llangibby, Sir Nicholas led the defence of Chepstow Castle and was killed there in combat on 25 May 1648 after refusing to surrender after the Castle's fall. The location, within the castle, is marked by a plaque erected by members of the Kemeys family in 1935.

He had married Jane, daughter of Sir Rowland Williams, Kt, of Llangibby Castle and left a son and heir, Sir Charles Kemeys, 2nd Baronet who also played an active role during the remainder of the war.

Baronetage of England
New creation	Baronet (of Kevanmabley); 1642–1648	Succeeded by Charles Kemeys
