= Sir Charles Tynte, 5th Baronet =

British politician (1710–1785)

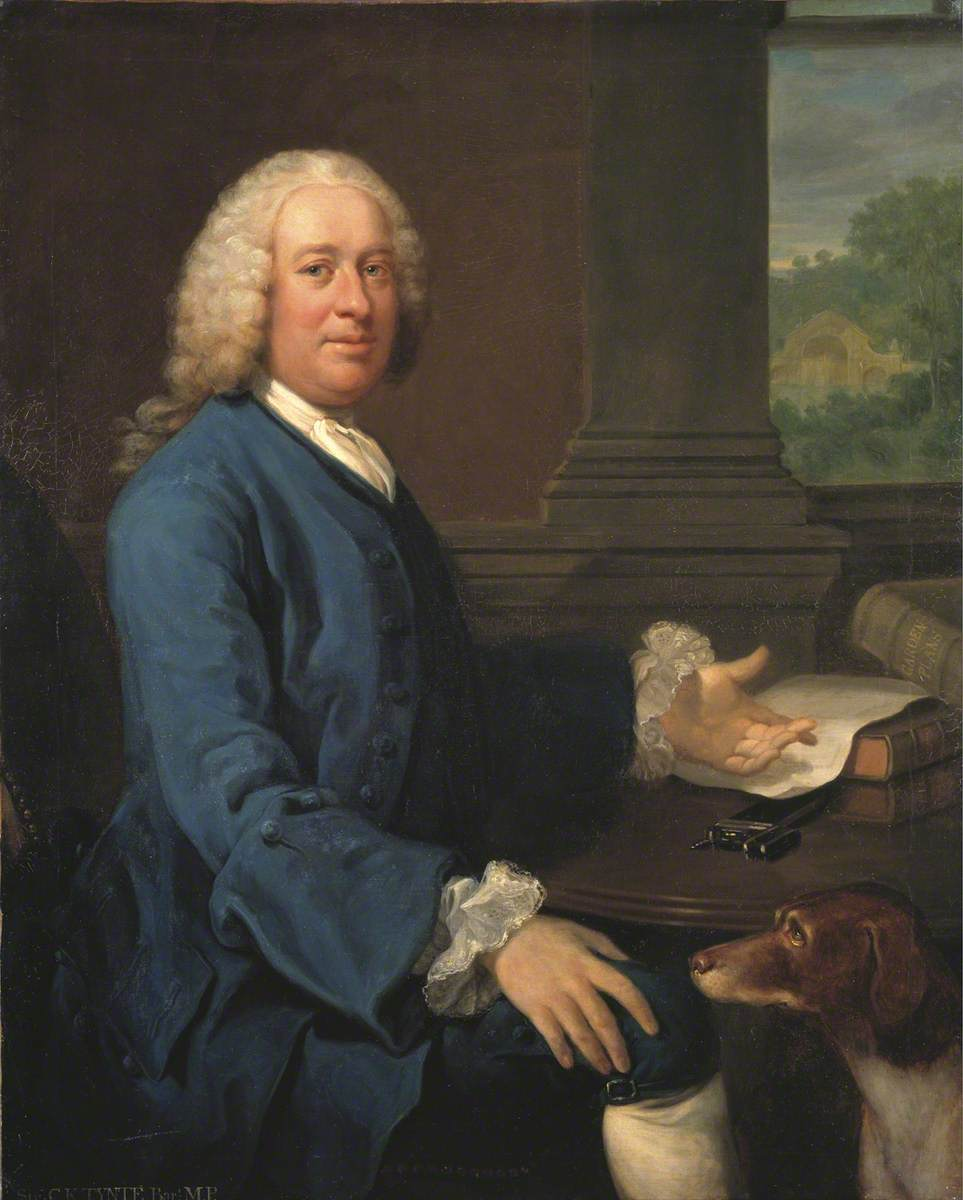

Sir Charles Kemys Tynte, 5th Baronet (19 May 1710 – 25 April 1785), of Halswell House, near Bridgwater, Somerset and Cefn Mably, Glamorganshire, was a British politician who sat in the House of Commons between 1745 and 1774.

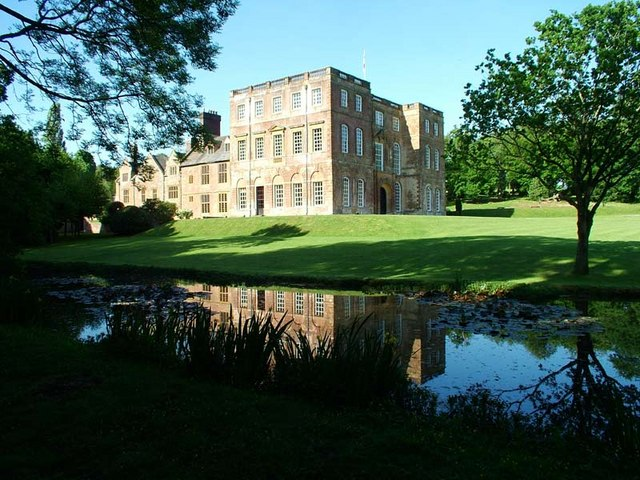
Halswell House

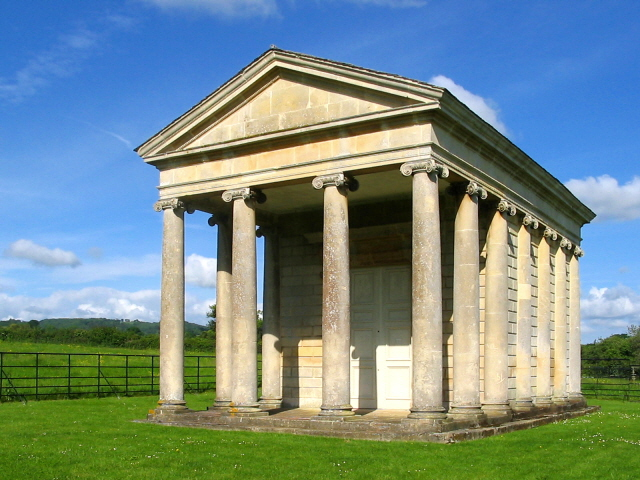
Temple of Harmony at Halswell House - completed in 1767

Tynte was a younger son of Sir John Tynte, 2nd Baronet of Halswell, Somerset, and his wife Jane Kemys, daughter of Sir Charles Kemys, 3rd Baronet, MP of Cefn Mably, Glamorgan. He added the name of Kemys before his own when he inherited Cefn Mably in 1735 from his uncle, Sir Charles Kemeys, 4th Baronet. He married Anne Busby, daughter of the Rev. Thomas Busby of Addington, Buckinghamshire on 9 March 1738. In 1740 he succeeded his brother Sir John Tynte 4th Baronet to the Tynte baronetcy and to Halswell House in Somerset. Between 1745 and 1785, Tynte considerably improved the gardens, creating Halswell Park. The grounds contain many fanciful buildings, fish ponds, cascades and bridges, and include the Temple of Harmony which stands in Mill Wood. Completed in 1767, it is Grade II listed.

Tynte was returned unopposed as Member of Parliament (MP) for Monmouth Boroughs at a by-election on 14 March 1745 with the support of the Duke of Beaufort. At the 1747 general election he was returned unopposed as MP for Somerset. He was returned again in the general elections of 1754, 1761 and 1768. He did not stand in 1774 for health reasons.

Tynte was appointed Colonel of the 2nd Somerset Militia when it was first embodied on 3 July 1759 and commanded it until the end of the American War of Independence.

Tynte died on 25 April 1785, leaving no children. He is buried in Goathurst with his monument sculpted by Joseph Nollekens.

The baronetcy became extinct and the Halswell estate passed to a niece, who took the name Kemeys Tynte and whose descendants regained the title of Baron Wharton.

Parliament of Great Britain
Preceded by Lord Charles Somerset	Member of Parliament for Monmouth Boroughs; 1745 – 1747	Succeeded by Fulke Greville
Preceded by Henry William Portman; Thomas Prowse	Member of Parliament for Somerset; 1747 – 1774; With: Thomas Prowse 1747–67; Sir Thomas Dyke Acland, Bt 1767–68; Richard Hippisley Coxe from 1768	Succeeded by Richard Hippisley Coxe; Edward Phelips
Baronetage of England
Preceded by John Tynte	Baronet (of Halswell); 1740-1785	Extinct
