= Sir Francis Warre, 1st Baronet =

British landowner and Tory politician (c. 1659–1718)

Sir Francis Warre, 1st Baronet (c. 1659–1718), of Hestercombe House, Kingston, Somerset, was a British landowner and Tory politician who sat in the English and British House of Commons between.1685 and 1715.

== Early life and family ==
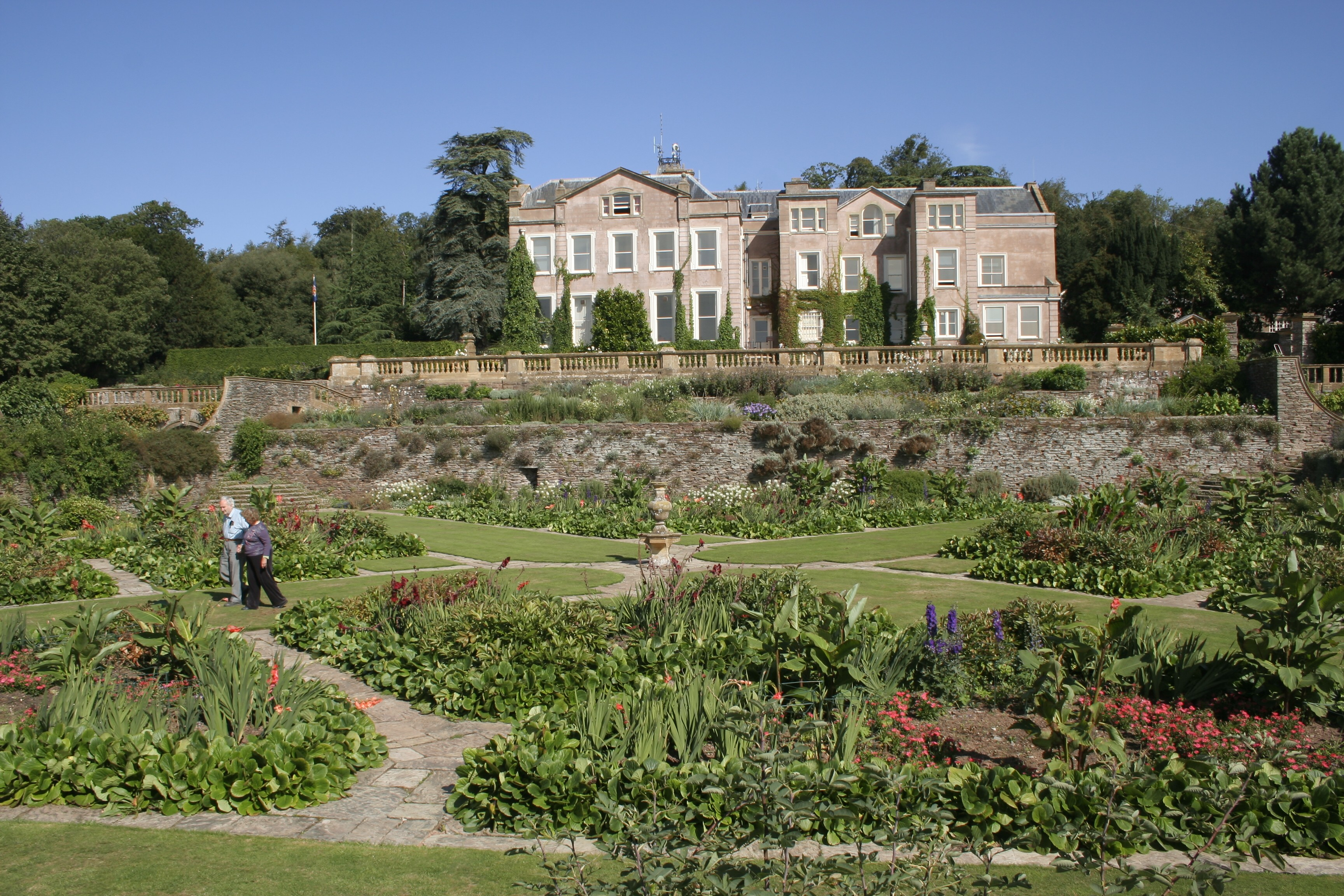
Hestercombe House, the seat of the Warre family

Warre was the only son of Sir John Warre of Hestercombe, where his family had lived since 1375, and his wife Unton Hawley, daughter of Francis Hawley, 1st Baron Hawley. In 1669 his father died and he succeeded to the estates which made him one of the largest landowners in Somerset. He was created baronet on 2 June 1673. He was educated at Sherborne and matriculated at Oriel College, Oxford on 16 October 1674, aged 15., From 1678 to 1678 he was a Captain in the. Duke of Monmouth's Foot. He resigned his commission before he married Anne Cuffe, daughter of Robert Cuffe of St. Michael Church, Somerset. She died on 24 December 1690 and he married secondly Margaret Harbin, daughter of John Harbin, merchant, of London.

== Career ==
Warre was appointed Deputy Lieutenant of Somerset in 1680 and a JP in 1681. He was active against dissenters, searching their houses and breaking up meetings. In 1683 he was nominated as recorder of Bridgwater under the town's new charter. At the general election of 1685, he was returned as a Tory Member of Parliament for Bridgwater. He opposed the Monmouth rebellion and was appointed one of the commissioners to discover the rebels’ estates. However the agents of King James II referred to him as ‘a very ill man’ and ‘a violent Churchman’ and he was removed from the lieutenancy in 1687 because he opposed James's religious policy. After the Glorious Revolution in 1688, he was reinstated as JP and Deputy Lieutenant. He was re-elected MP for Bridgwater in 1689, and was appointed to the committee of elections and privileges. He was also appointed commissioner for assessment for Somerset in 1689. He continued to sit as a Tory under King William III and Queen Anne.

Warre was appointed commissioner for assessment for Bridgwater in 1690 and was re-elected MP for Bridgwater at the 1690 general election. He was a colonel of the militia foot of Somerset from 1691 to 1697, but was absent from the house for much of this Parliament. He did not stand in the 1695 and 1698 general elections, but regained his seat at Bridgwater without opposition at a by-election on 29 November 1699. He stood down in the first 1701 general election, but was returned at a by-election in March as MP for Taunton. His estate was close to Taunton and he was appointed Recorder of Taunton in 1701. He was elected in a contest as MP for Taunton at the 1702 English general election and was appointed Vice-admiral of Somerset and Bristol in 1702. He was returned unopposed in the 1705 English general election and voted against the Court candidate for Speaker on 25 October 1705. At the 1708 British general election he was returned again as Tory MP and voted against the impeachment of Dr Sacheverell in 1710. He was returned successfully in a contest at the 1710 British general election. He was listed as a ‘Tory patriot’ who opposed the continuance of the war, and a ‘worthy patriot’ who helped to detect the mismanagements of the previous administration. He was a member of the October Club. At the 1713 British general election he was returned without opposition again.

Warre, was re-elected for Taunton at a contest in 1715 but was unseated on petition on 30 August 1715. In September 1715 he gave Sir William Wyndham a letter from Lord Lansdowne about arrangements for a planned Jacobite rebellion in the west country, which was found by the officer sent to arrest Wyndham. He was arrested as a Jacobite, but released a few months later.

== Death and legacy ==
Warre died at Ghent 1 December 1718. and was buried with his ancestors at Kingston. He had one son, Michael by his first marriage who was a Captain of Dragoons and who predeceased him, dying at Ghent. A son by his second wife died in infancy, and he had only a surviving daughter Margaret. The baronetcy therefore became extinct and his estate, which included the manor of Middlezoy, went to his daughter, who married John Bampfylde and brought him the Hestercombe estate. The estate eventually passed to a grandson John Tyndale, who adopted the name Warre.

Parliament of England
Preceded by Sir Halswell Tynte; Sir John Malet	Member of Parliament for Bridgwater; 1685–1695; With: Sir Halswell Tynte; Henry Bull 1689; Robert Balch 1692	Succeeded by Nathaniel Palmer; Roger Hoar
Preceded by George Crane; Roger Hoar	Member of Parliament for Bridgwater; 1699 – 1701; With: George Crane	Succeeded by John Gilbert; George Balch
Preceded by Henry Seymour Portman; Edward Clarke	Member of Parliament for Taunton; 1701–1708; With: Edward Clarke	Succeeded by Parliament of Great Britain
Parliament of Great Britain
Preceded by Parliament of England	Member of Parliament for Taunton; 1708–1715; With: Edward Clarke 1708–1710; Henry Seymour Portman 1710–1715	Succeeded by William Pynsent; James Smith
Baronetage of England
New creation	Baronet (of Hestercombe); 1673–1715	Extinct
