= James Stratford Tynte =

Anglo-Irish baronet (1760–1785)

Sir James Stratford Tynte, 1st Baronet (August 1760 – 10 November 1785) was an Anglo-Irish baronet.

Tynte was the son of Robert Tynte and Lady Elizabeth Stratford, daughter of John Stratford, 1st Earl of Aldborough. He was a General in the Irish Volunteers. In 1778 he was created a baronet, of Dunlaven in the Baronetage of Ireland. Tynte served as High Sheriff of Wicklow in 1785. Upon his death his title became extinct.

Baronetage of Ireland
New creation	Baronet (of Dunlaven); 1778–1785	Extinct
