= Edward Phelips (died 1797) =

Edward Phelips (1725–1797) was an English country landowner and politician who sat in the House of Commons from 1774 to 1780.

Phelips was the eldest son of Edward Phelips MP of Montacute House, and his second wife Elizabeth Phelips, daughter of his uncle Sir Edward Phelips, MP. He succeeded his father to Montacute in 1734. He was educated at Westminster School from February 1737, and matriculated at Christ Church, Oxford on 23 April 1741, aged 16. He married. Maria Wright, daughter of William Wright in about.1747

Phelips was returned unopposed as Member of Parliament for Somerset at the 1774 general election and was the fifth member of the family to represent the county. The Public Ledger wrote of him that he “ seems much fitter for parish or turnpike business, than to be the representative of a great county in Parliament” and he is not recorded as having spoken in Parliament. He did not stand again in 1780.

Phelips died in 1797. He and his wife Maria had four sons and two daughters. His eldest son Edward was also MP for Somerset.

Parliament of Great Britain
Preceded by Sir Charles Kemys Tynte; Richard Hippisley Coxe	Member of Parliament for Somerset; 1774–1780; With: Richard Hippisley Coxe	Succeeded by Sir John Trevelyan, Bt; Richard Hippisley Coxe
