= Richard Hippisley Coxe =

British politician

Richard Hippisley Coxe (22 September 1742 – 26 August 1786) was a British politician who sat in the House of Commons from 1768 to 1784.

Coxe was the son of John Hippisley Coxe of Ston Easton and his wife Mary Northleigh, daughter of Stephen Northleigh of Peamore, Devon. He was educated at Westminster School from 1754 to 1759 and matriculated at Christ Church, Oxford on 19 June 1759. He was awarded BA in 1763. He succeeded his father on 29 May 1769 and inherited Ston Easton Park.

In the 1768 general election Coxe was elected Member of Parliament for Somerset with Sir Charles Kemys Tynte against John Trevelyan, who declined the poll. Coxe's share of the election expenses came to over £2,600. He was re-elected without a contest in 1774 and 1780. He is not known to have voted in any division after that year, but he spoke twice. About 1780, his health began to fail, and in 1783 it was thought he was dying. He did not stand in 1784.

Coxe was subsequently ‘found to be lunatic under a writ de lunatico inquirendo’. His brothers were put in charge of his person and estates by an order of the court of Chancery on 9 December 1784. He died, unmarried, on 26 August 1786, aged 43.

Parliament of Great Britain
Preceded by Sir Charles Kemys Tynte; Sir Thomas Dyke Acland, Bt	Member of Parliament for Somerset; 1768–1784; With: Sir Charles Kemys Tynte 1768-1774; Edward Phelips 1774-1780; Sir John Trevelyan, Bt 1780-1784	Succeeded by Sir John Trevelyan, Bt; Edward Phelips
