= Warre baronets =

Extinct baronetcy in the Baronetage of England

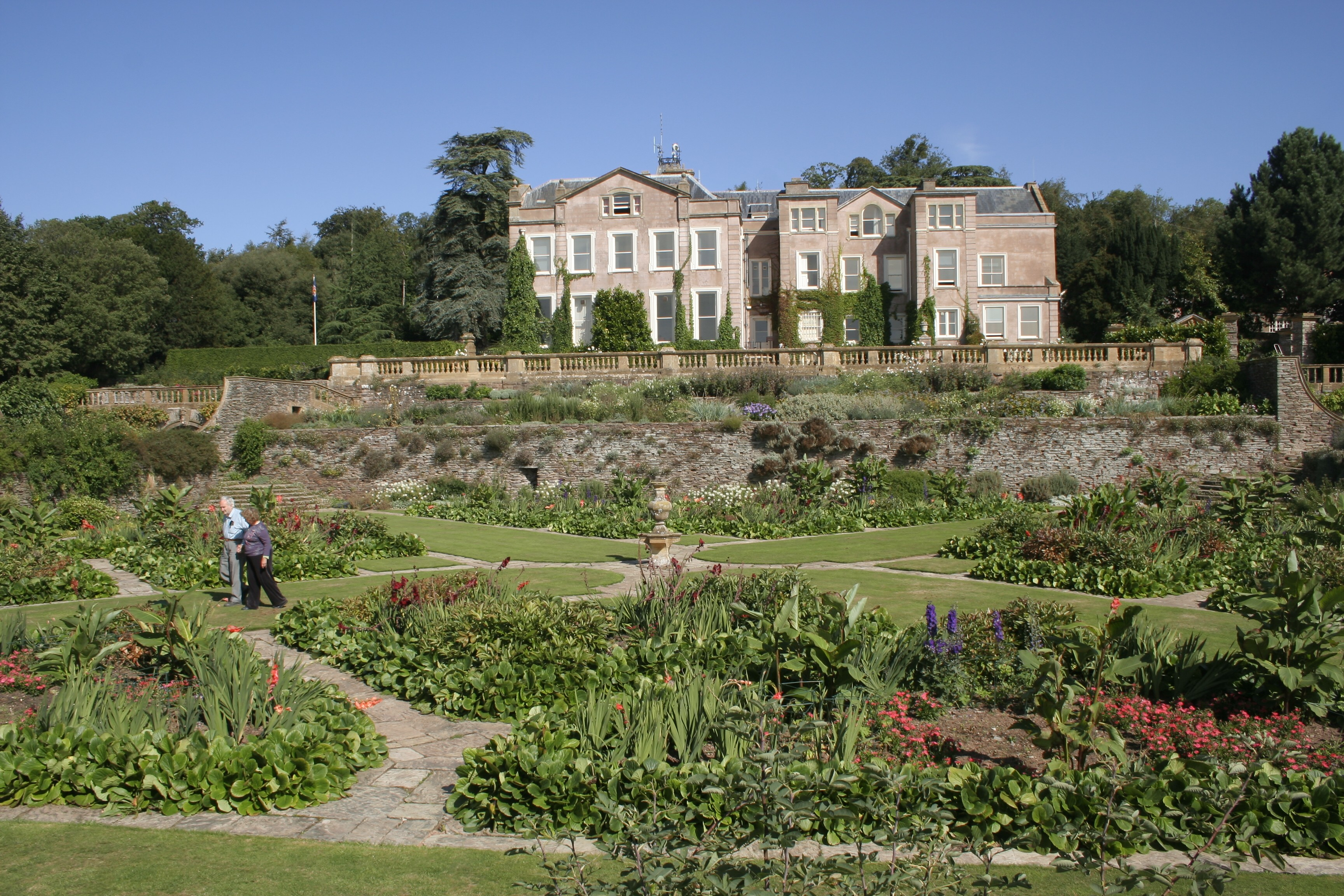
Hestercombe House, the seat of the Warre family

The Warre Baronetcy, of Hestercombe in the County of Somerset, was a title in the Baronetage of England. It was created on 2 June 1673 for Francis Warre, subsequently Member of Parliament for Bridgwater and Taunton. He was the only son of Sir John Warre, of Hestercombe House, Taunton, Somerset, a Knight of the Shire for Somerset. Sir Francis had no surviving male issue and the title became extinct on his death in 1718. His daughter and heiress, Margaret, married John Bampfylde. Their son, Coplestone Warre Bampfylde, succeeded to the family estates.;

== Warre baronets, of Hestercombe (1673) ==
Escutcheon of the Warre baronets of Hestercombe

- Sir Francis Warre, 1st Baronet (c. 1659–1718)
