= Sir Charles Kemeys, 2nd Baronet =

Welsh landowner (1614–1658)

Sir Charles Kemeys, 2nd Baronet (c. 1614–1658) was the second of the Kemeys Baronets, a Welsh family of landowners in the county of Monmouthshire, Wales.

His father, Sir Nicholas Kemeys, 1st Baronet was MP for Monmouth in 1628, High Sheriff of Monmouthshire in 1621 and High Sheriff of Glamorgan in 1638, before being created the first baronet in 1642 by Charles I. Sir Nicholas died on 25 May 1648, during the English Civil War, defending Chepstow Castle against the Parliamentarian forces.

Sir Charles, who had been educated at Jesus College, Oxford and at Gray's Inn, was knighted in 1643 and succeeded his father to the baronetcy. He was appointed High Sheriff of Glamorgan in 1644. He also took part in the English Civil War on the king's side, attacking Cardiff in 1646 and defending Pembroke Castle afterwards. When the castle surrendered, he was fined £3,500 (equivalent to £269,753 in 2007 ) and exiled for two years.

Sir Charles died in 1658. He was succeeded by his son, Sir Charles Kemeys, 3rd Baronet.

Baronetage of England
Preceded by Nicholas Kemeys	Baronet (of Kevanmabley); 1648–1658	Succeeded by Charles Kemeys
