= Bertholey House =

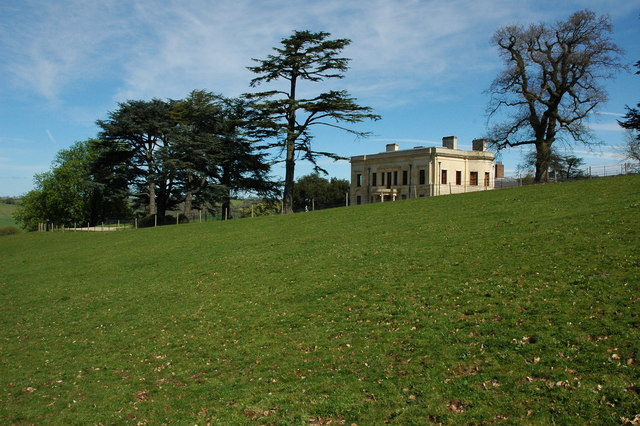
- The house in its park

- Location within Monmouthshire
- 51.6462°N 2.8721°W
- Type: House
- Location: Llantrisant, Monmouthshire

History
- Built: c.1830

Site notes
- Architectural style: Neoclassical

Cadw/ICOMOS Register of Parks and Gardens of Special Historic Interest in Wales
- Official name: Bertholey House
- Designated: 1 February 2022
- Reference no.: PGW(Gt)11(MON)
- Listing: Grade II

Listed Building – Grade II
- Official name: Former Farmhouse Range at Bertholey
- Designated: 25 February 2000
- Reference no.: 22918

Listed Building – Grade II
- Official name: Stable/Cartshed block at Bertholey, including attached wall and lean-to to west
- Designated: 3 August 2000
- Reference no.: 23868

Listed Building – Grade II
- Official name: Dovecote at Bertholey
- Designated: 25 February 2000
- Reference no.: 22920

Bertholey House, is a country house near the village of Llantrisant, in Monmouthshire, Wales. A Tudor house originally stood on the site, the home of the Kemeys family. In the 1830s, a new mansion was built, in a Neoclassical style, for Colthurst Bateman. This house was almost completely destroyed in a fire in 1905. In 1999, the mansion was restored and is again a private home. The gardens and grounds are listed on the Cadw/ICOMOS Register of Parks and Gardens of Special Historic Interest in Wales.

== History ==
The estate at Bertholey originally belonged to a cadet branch of the Kemeys family of Kemeys Manor. John Newman, in his Gwent/Monmouthshire volume of the Pevsner Buildings of Wales notes that Edward, Lord of Kemeys, had established his family in South Wales in the early 13th century.

In 1809, Colthurst Bateman (1780-1859) married Jane Sarah Kemeys Gardener-Kemeys, heiress to Bertholey, and they built a new house on the site. This has been attributed to George Vaughan Maddox of Monmouth, a prominent local architect. (Note: John Newman does not ascribe the house to Maddox, describing the house's architect as unknown.)

The house was almost totally destroyed by fire in 1905. It was restored in 1999.

== Architecture and description ==
John Newman suggests that, had Bertholey survived, it would have been "one of the outstanding Neoclassical buildings in the county." It was of three storeys and five bays. (Note: The 1990s reconstruction only restored two of the original three storeys.)

In 2022 the gardens and park were listed on the Cadw/ICOMOS Register of Parks and Gardens of Special Historic Interest in Wales. Three estate buildings are listed, all at grade II, including elements of the original house, which were used as a farmhouse after 1830, the stables, and a dovecote.

== Sources ==
- Newman, John (2000). Gwent/Monmouthshire. The Buildings of Wales. Penguin. ISBN 0-14-071053-1.
