= Tynte's Castle =

Tower house in Youghal, County Cork, Ireland

- 148 North Main Street, Youghal, County Cork, Ireland
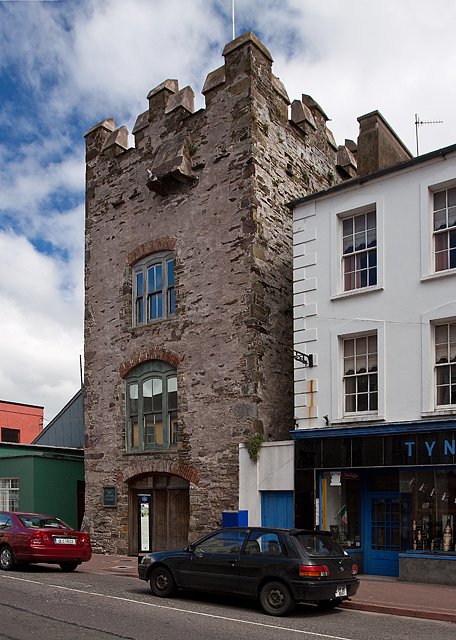
- View of the west face, from the street

Site information
- Type: tower house

Location
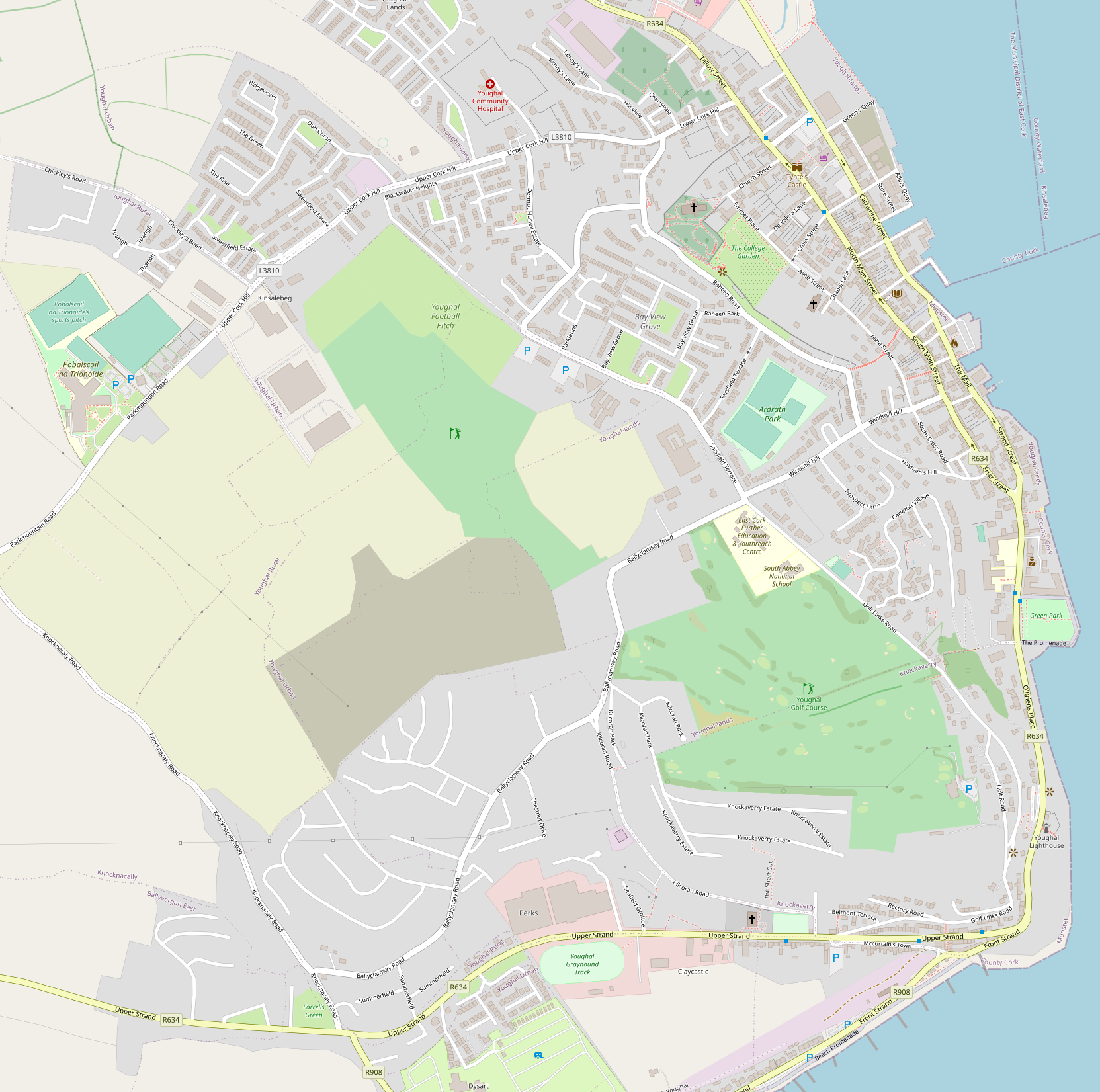
- Coordinates: 51°57′21″N 7°51′01″W
- Height: 50 ft (15 m)

Site history
- Built: late 15th century
- Built by: Walsh family

Tynte's Castle (/ˈtɪnts/; Irish: Caisleán Tynte) is a tower house located in Youghal, eastern County Cork, Ireland.

== Location ==
Tynte's Castle is located in the north of Youghal's historic core, on Main Street (anciently King's Street); it is 420 m (460 yd) north-northwest of Youghal's Clock Gate and 220 m (240 yd) east-northeast of St Mary's Collegiate Church. The tower was originally on the riverfront, but when the Blackwater River silted up and changed course in the 17th–18th centuries, it was left 220 m (240 yd) from the water.

== History ==
Tynte's Castle was built in the late 15th century by the Walsh family, Cambro-Norman merchants who built stores and fortified houses in the town to protect their trade goods. After the Second Desmond Rebellion (1579–1583) they were stripped of their property, which reverted to the Crown.

The tower was leased to Sir Robert Tynte (1571–1663) in the late 16th century and refurbished in 1643.

Oliver Cromwell's army entered Youghal in 1649 during the Cromwellian conquest of Ireland; it is assumed that it was used to quarter Parliamentarian soldiers. In 1689, during the reign of King James II, it was used as a prison for Cromwell supporters and an attempt was made to burn it down. The castle remained with the Tyntes until it was sold in 1866 to William Raymond FitzMaurice, a wealthy Anglo-Irish landowner.

The castle was acquired by the McCarthy family in the 1950s, and they restored it. It is now open to tourists.

== Building ==
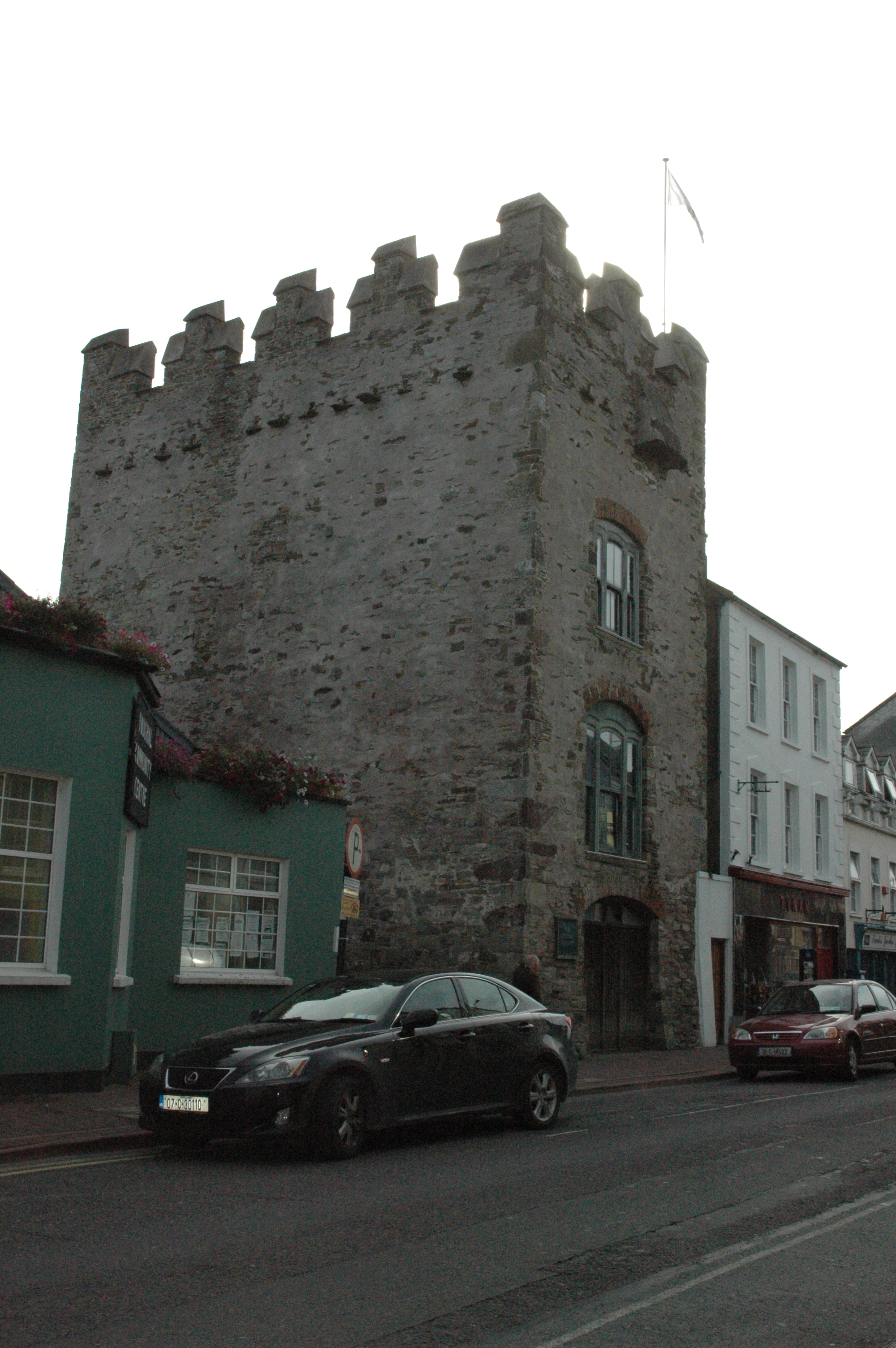
North wall

A fortified stone tower of three storeys, with base batter. It has a hipped slate roof with machicolations, Irish crenellations and a murder hole. There are large windows in the west wall topped with brick arches; these were probably added in the 19th century when the castle was used as a granary.
