= Sir Charles Kemeys, 3rd Baronet =

Welsh landowner

Sir Charles Kemeys, 3rd Baronet (died December 1702) was a Welsh landowner in the late 17th century and early 18th century in south Wales and MP for both Monmouthshire and Monmouth Boroughs.

He was a student at Wadham College, Oxford. His father Sir Charles Kemeys, 2nd Baronet, died in 1658.

Sir Charles Kemeys was MP for Monmouthshire between 1685 and 1687, High Sheriff of Glamorgan in 1689 and then returned again as MP for Monmouthshire between 1695 and 1698 and MP for Monmouth Borough from 1690 to 1695.

He was also Governor of Cardiff Castle in 1702 and died in the December of that year.

His son, another Charles Kemeys (born 23 November 1688) became the 4th Baronet. He in turn was MP for Monmouthshire 1713–1715 and MP for Glamorgan 1716–1734 but died in 1735 without issue and the baronetcy became extinct.

His daughter, Jane Kemeys, had married in 1704 Sir John Tynte of Halswell House, Somerset.

Baronetage of the United Kingdom
Preceded by Charles Kemeys	Baronet (of Kevanmabley); 1658–1702	Succeeded by Charles Kemeys
