= Kemeys baronets =

Extinct baronetcy in the Baronetage of England

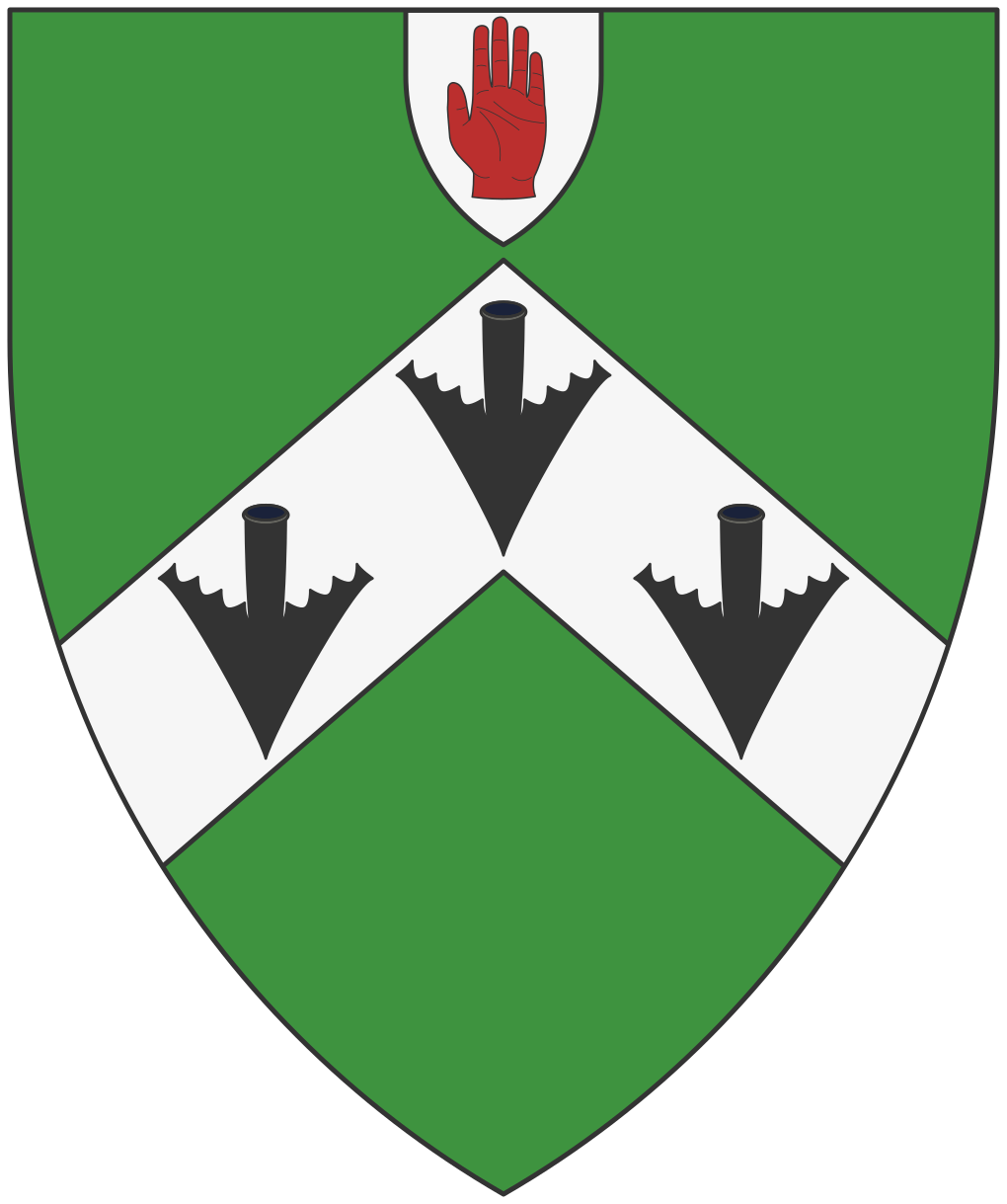
The coat of arms of Kemeys of Kevanmabley, Baronets.

The Kemeys Baronetcy, of Kevanmabley (Cefn Mabley) in the County of Glamorgan, was a title in the Baronetage of England. It was created on 13 May 1642 for the Welsh landowner and politician Nicholas Kemeys. His son, the second Baronet, was knighted before succeeding in the title and fought in the Civil War. The latter's son, the third Baronet, and grandson, the fourth Baronet, were both Members of Parliament. The title became extinct on the fourth Baronet's death in 1735.

== Kemeys baronets, of Kevanmabley (1642) ==
- Sir Nicholas Kemeys, 1st Baronet (died 1648)
- Sir Charles Kemeys, 2nd Baronet (c. 1614–1658)
- Sir Charles Kemeys, 3rd Baronet (1651–1702)
- Sir Charles Kemeys, 4th Baronet (1688–1735)
