= Edward Kemys =

Edward Kemys (c. 1693–1736), of Bertholey House, Monmouthshire, was a Tory politician who sat in the House of Commons from 1722 to 1734.

Kemys was the eldest son of Edward Kemys of Pertholey and Maesgenwith and his wife Anne Bray, daughter of Reginald Bray of Barrington, Gloucestershire. He was educated at Eton College from 1705 to 1711, succeeding his father in 1710. He was admitted at King's College, Cambridge in 1712 and became a fellow of Kings in 1715. He was awarded BA in 1716 and MA in 1719.

At the 1722 British general election, Kemys was returned unopposed as a Tory Member of Parliament for Monmouth Boroughs by the Duke of Beaufort. He was returned again unopposed at the 1727 British general election. His only recorded vote was against the Administration on the Hessians in 1730. He did not stand again in 1734.

Kemys died unmarried in 1736.

Parliament of the United Kingdom
Preceded by Andrews Windsor	Member of Parliament for Monmouth Boroughs; 1722–1734	Succeeded by Lord Charles Somerset
