= Goathurst =

Village in Somerset, England

Coordinates: 51.103°N 3.064°W

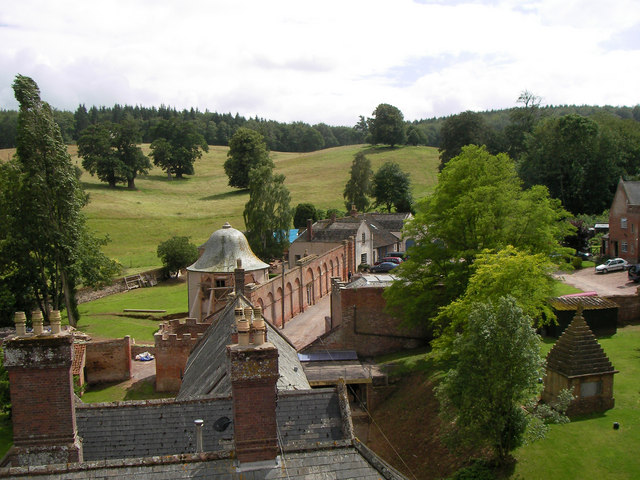
- Halswell House

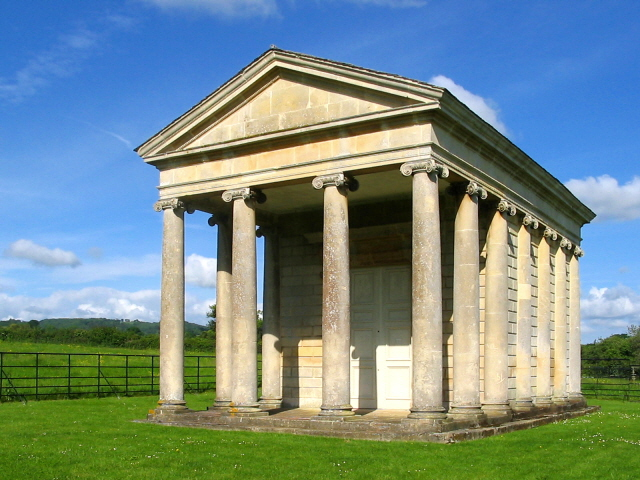
- Temple of Harmony

- Location within Somerset
- Population: 193 (2011)
- OS grid reference: ST255345
- Unitary authority: Somerset Council
- Ceremonial county: Somerset
- Region: South West
- Country: England
- Sovereign state: United Kingdom
- Post town: BRIDGWATER
- Postcode district: TA5
- Dialling code: 01278
- Police: Avon and Somerset
- Fire: Devon and Somerset
- Ambulance: South Western
- UK Parliament: Bridgwater

Goathurst is a small village and civil parish in the English county of Somerset, around 3 miles from the town of Bridgwater. The parish includes the hamlets of Andersfield and Huntstile. The village is on the route of the Samaritans Way South West.

== History ==
Goathurst was part of the hundred of Andersfield.

Originally part of the Royal Forest of North Petherton, its first squire owned Goathurst's St Edward's church, a Grade I listed building which includes a 19th-century monument to three-year-old Isabella Kemeys, showing the child lying on a pillow holding a broken flower.

Goathurst was the location of a 300-person prisoner of war camp during World War II, initially housing Italian prisoners from the Western Desert Campaign, and later German prisoners following the Battle of Normandy.

== Governance ==
The parish council has responsibility for local issues, including setting an annual precept (local rate) to cover the council's operating costs and producing annual accounts for public scrutiny. The parish council evaluates local planning applications and works with the local police, district council officers, and neighbourhood watch groups on matters of crime, security, and traffic. The parish council's role also includes initiating projects for the maintenance and repair of parish facilities, as well as consulting with the district council on the maintenance, repair, and improvement of highways, drainage, footpaths, public transport, and street cleaning. Conservation matters (including trees and listed buildings) and environmental issues are also the responsibility of the council.

For local government purposes, since 1 April 2023, the village comes under the unitary authority of Somerset Council. Prior to this, it was part of the non-metropolitan district of Sedgemoor, which was formed on 1 April 1974 under the Local Government Act 1972, having previously been part of Bridgwater Rural District.

It is also part of the Bridgwater county constituency represented in the House of Commons of the Parliament of the United Kingdom. It elects one Member of Parliament (MP) by the first past the post system of election, and was part of the South West England constituency of the European Parliament prior to Britain leaving the European Union in January 2020, which elected seven MEPs using the d'Hondt method of party-list proportional representation.

== See also ==
- Halswell House
- Robin Hood's Hut
