= Cefn Mably =

Area in Cardiff / Caerphilly, Wales

Coordinates: 51.555°N 3.118°W

Cefn Mably (Welsh: Cefn Mabli) is a district located approximately 6 miles north of Cardiff city centre and 5 miles south-east of Caerphilly.

It's mostly within the city and county of Cardiff but is also partly within the Caerphilly County Borough.

== Notable Buildings ==
Cefn Mably House is an historic property in the area.

== Greyhound racing ==
The greyhounds that raced at the Cardiff Arms Park and Somerton Park were based at kennels in Cefn Mably.

== Fishing ==
There's 8 fishing lakes, and the Cardiff Angling Centre based at the Cefn Mably Lakes.

== Farming ==
There's an outdoor entertainment venue based at Cefn Mably Farm Park. It contains a soft play barn, child friendly go-karting and digger facilities, a farm shop, hot and cold food for sale, and as the name suggests a working farm.

== Drinking ==
The local pub is The Cefn Mably Arms in the nearby village of Michaelston-y-Fedw.
