= Lunar Society of Birmingham =

British dinner club and learned society, 1755–1813

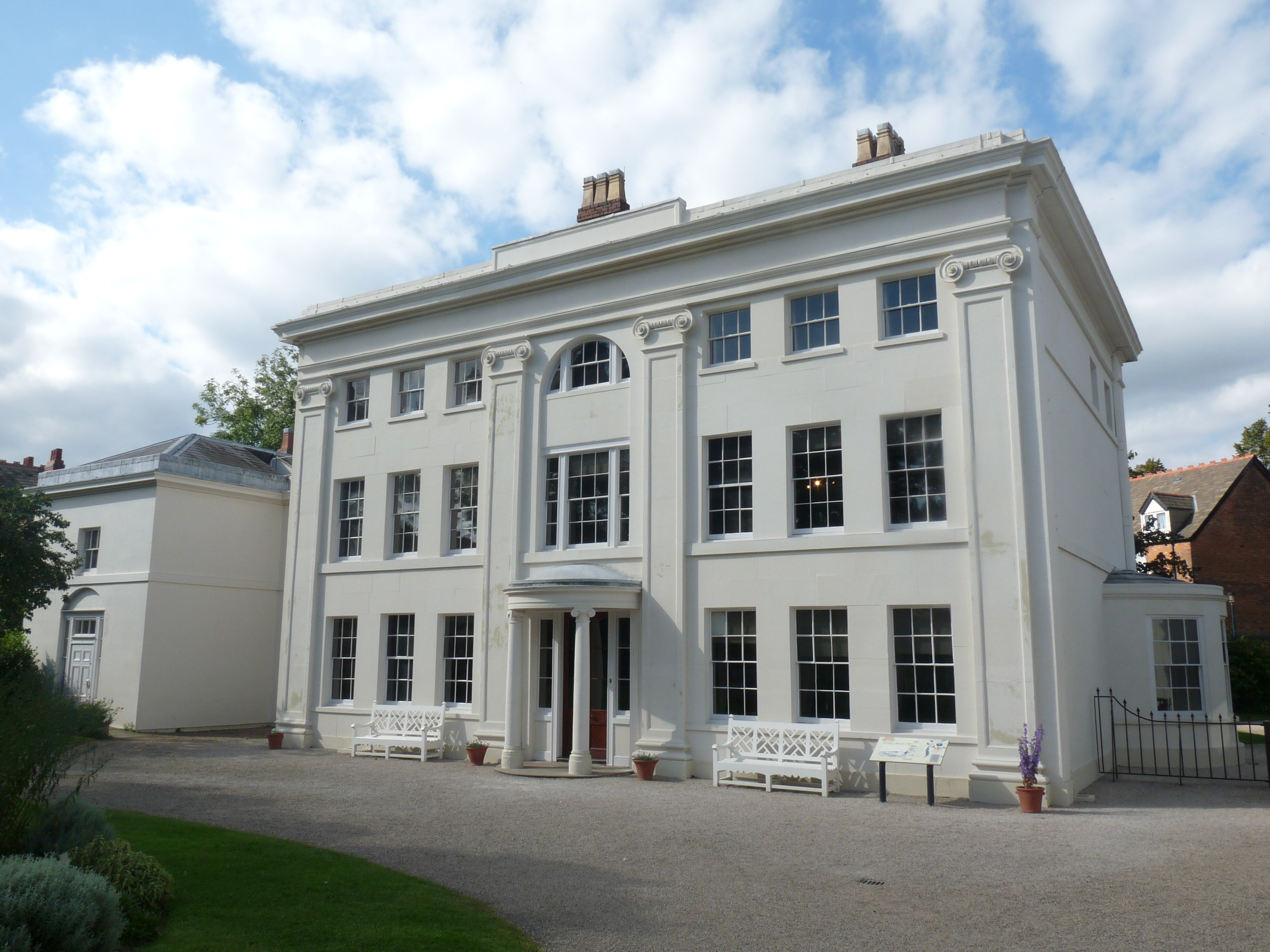
Soho House in Handsworth, Birmingham, a regular venue for meetings of the Lunar Society

The Lunar Society of Birmingham was a British dinner club and informal learned society of prominent figures in the Midlands Enlightenment, including industrialists, natural philosophers and intellectuals, who met regularly between 1765 and 1813 in Birmingham. At first called the Lunar Circle, "Lunar Society" became the formal name by 1775. The name arose because the society would meet during the full moon, as the extra light made the journey home easier and safer in the absence of street lighting. The members cheerfully referred to themselves as "lunaticks", a contemporary spelling of lunatics. Venues included Erasmus Darwin's home in Lichfield, Matthew Boulton's home, Soho House, Bowbridge House in Derbyshire, and Great Barr Hall.

== Membership and status ==
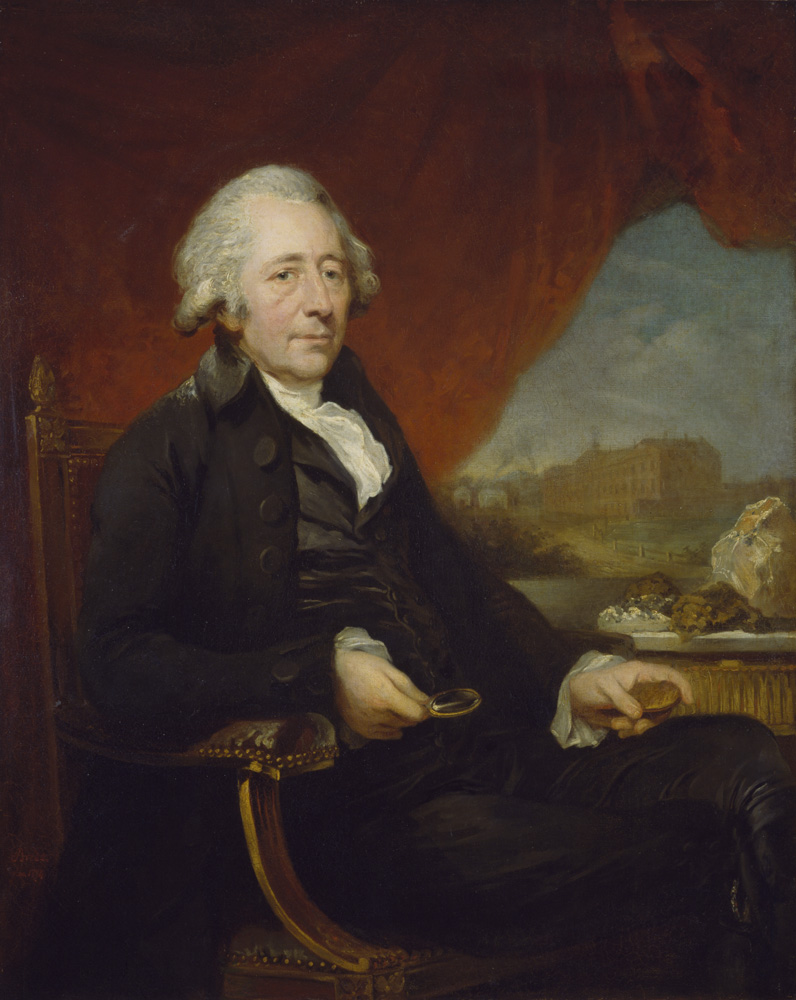
Matthew Boulton

The Lunar Society evolved through various degrees of organisation over a period of up to fifty years, but was only ever an informal group. No constitution, minutes, publications or membership lists survive from any period, and evidence of its existence and activities is found only in the correspondence and notes of those associated with it. Historians therefore disagree on what qualifies as membership of the Lunar Society, who can be considered to have been members, and even when the society can be said to have existed. Josiah Wedgwood, for example, is described by some commentators as being one of five "principal members" of the society, while others consider that he "cannot be recognized as [a] full member" at all. Dates given for the establishment of the society range from "sometime before 1760" to 1775. Some historians argue that it had ceased to exist by 1791; others that it was still operating as late as 1813.

Despite this uncertainty, fourteen individuals have been identified as having verifiably attended Lunar Society meetings regularly over a long period during its most productive eras: these are Matthew Boulton, Erasmus Darwin, Thomas Day, Richard Lovell Edgeworth, Samuel Galton, Jr., Robert Augustus Johnson, James Keir, Joseph Priestley, William Small, Jonathan Stokes, James Watt, Josiah Wedgwood, John Whitehurst and William Withering.

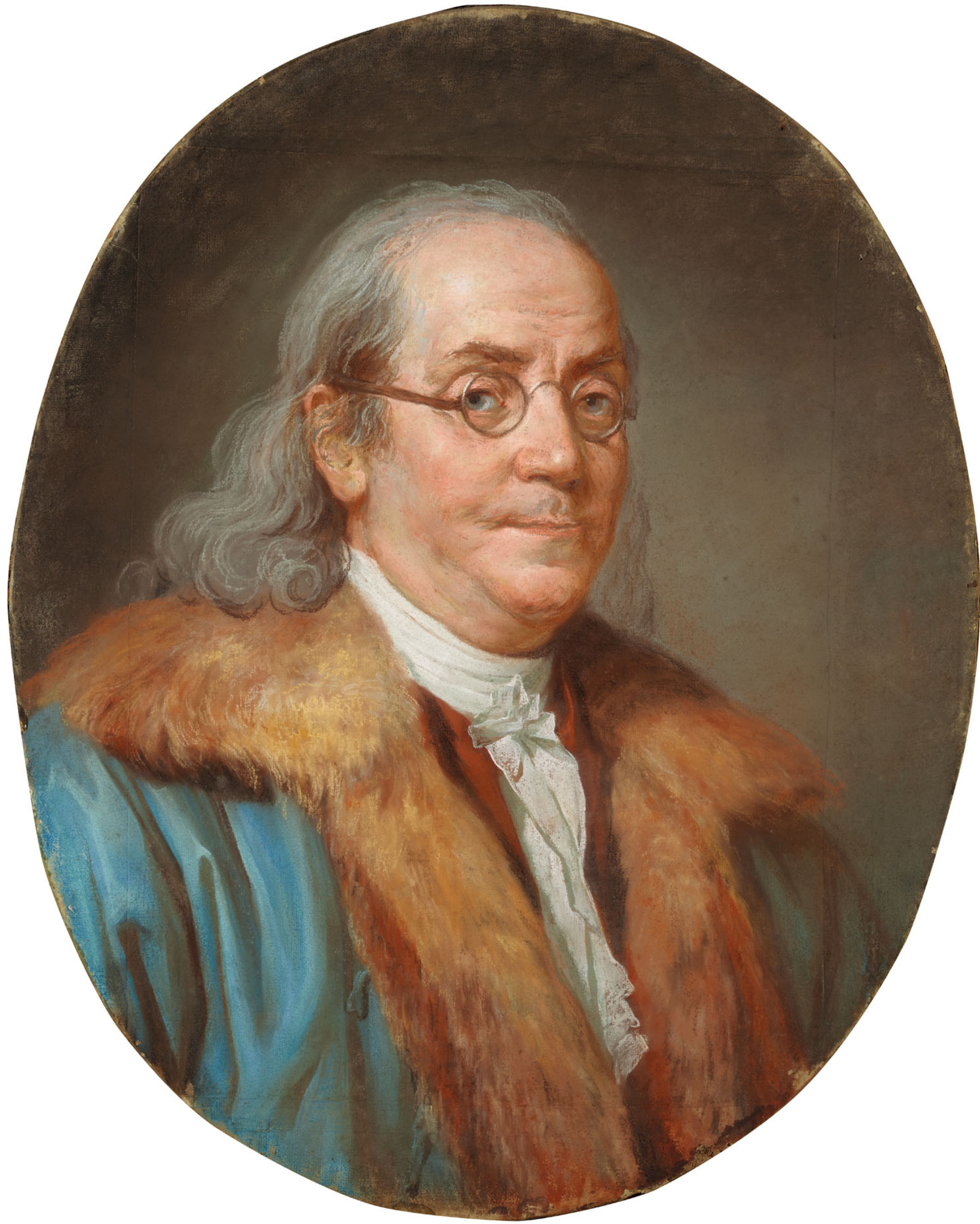
Benjamin Franklin by Joseph Ducreux, 1777

While the society's meetings provided its name and social focus, however, they were relatively unimportant in its activities, and far more activity and communication took place outside the meetings themselves – members local to Birmingham were in almost daily contact, more distant ones in correspondence at least weekly. A more loosely defined group has therefore been identified over a wider geographical area and longer time period, who attended meetings occasionally and who corresponded or co-operated regularly with multiple other members on group activities. These include Joseph Pickford, Richard Kirwan, John Smeaton, Henry Moyes, John Michell, Pieter Camper, R. E. Raspe, John Baskerville, Thomas Beddoes, John Wyatt, William Thomson, Cyril Jackson, Jean-André Deluc, John Wilkinson, John Ash, Samuel More, Robert Bage, James Brindley, Ralph Griffiths, John Roebuck, Thomas Percival, Joseph Black, James Hutton, Benjamin Franklin, Joseph Banks, James Lind, William Herschel, Daniel Solander, John Warltire, George Fordyce, Alexander Blair, Samuel Parr, Louis Joseph d'Albert d'Ailly, William Emes, the seventh Duke of Chaulnes, Barthélemy Faujas de Saint-Fond, Grossart de Virly, Johann Gottling. and Joseph Wright.

This lack of a defined membership has led some historians to criticise a Lunar Society "legend", leading people to "confuse it and its efforts with the general growth of intellectual and economic activities in the provinces of eighteenth century Britain". Others have seen this both as real and as one of the society's main strengths: a paper read at the Science Museum in London in 1963 claimed that

"of all the provincial philosophical societies it was the most important, perhaps because it was not merely provincial. All the world came to Soho to meet Boulton, Watt or Small, who were acquainted with the leading men of Science throughout Europe and America. Its essential sociability meant that any might be invited to attend its meetings."

== Development ==
=== Origins 1755–1765 ===
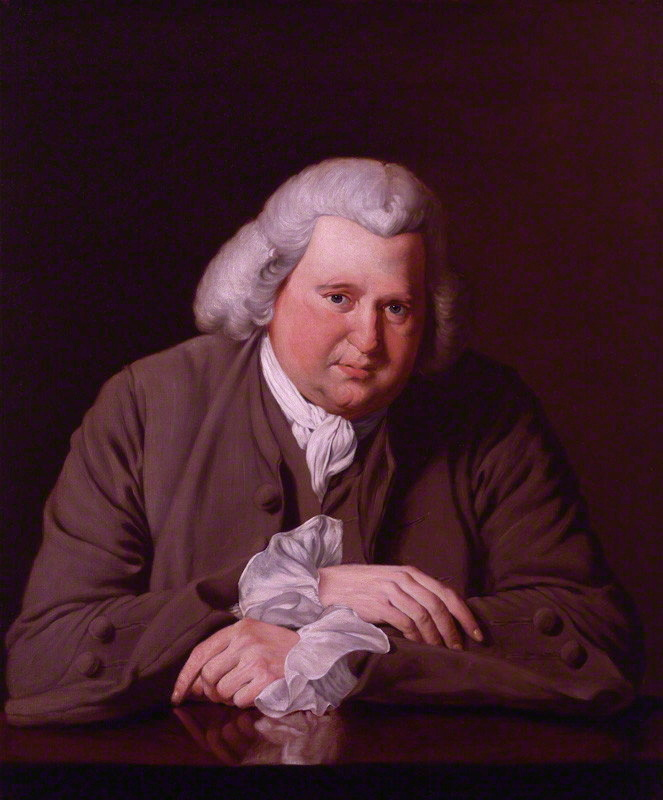
Erasmus Darwin by Joseph Wright of Derby, 1770 (Birmingham Museum and Art Gallery)

The origins of the Lunar Society lie in a pattern of friendships that emerged in the late 1750s. Matthew Boulton and Erasmus Darwin met at some time during 1757 or 1758, possibly through family connections, as Boulton's mother's family were patients of Darwin; or possibly though shared friendships, as both were admirers of the printer John Baskerville and friends of the astronomer and geologist John Michell, a regular visitor to Darwin's house in Lichfield. Darwin was a physician and poet who had studied at Cambridge and Edinburgh; Boulton had left school at fourteen and started work in his father's business making metal goods in Birmingham at the age of 21. Despite their different backgrounds they shared a common interest in experiment and invention, and their activities would show Darwin's theoretical understanding and Boulton's practical experience to be complementary. Soon they were visiting each other regularly and conducting investigations into scientific subjects such as electricity, meteorology and geology.

Around the same time the Derby-based clockmaker John Whitehurst became a friend, first of Boulton and subsequently of Darwin, through his business supplying clock movements to Boulton's ormolu manufacturing operation. Although older than both Boulton and Darwin, by 1758 Whitehurst was writing to Boulton telling excitedly of a pyrometer he had built, and looking forward to visiting Birmingham "to spend one day with you in trying all necessary experiments".

Boulton, Darwin and Whitehurst were in turn introduced by Michell to Benjamin Franklin when he travelled to Birmingham in July 1758 "to improve and increase Acquaintance among Persons of Influence", and Franklin returned in 1760 to conduct experiments with Boulton on electricity and sound. Although Michell seems to have withdrawn slightly from the group when he moved to Thornhill (near Dewsbury) in 1767, Franklin was to remain a common link among many of the early members.

=== The Lunar Circle 1765–1775 ===
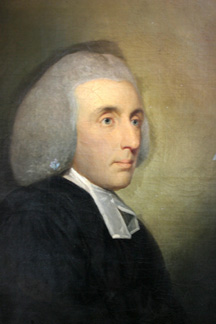
William Small

The nature of the group was to change significantly with the move to Birmingham in 1765 of the Scottish physician William Small, who had been Professor of Natural Philosophy at The College of William & Mary in Williamsburg, Virginia. There he had taught and been a major influence over Thomas Jefferson, and had formed the focus of a local group of intellectuals. His arrival with a letter of introduction to Matthew Boulton from Benjamin Franklin was to have a galvanising effect on the existing circle, which began to explicitly identify itself as a group and actively started to attract new members.

The first of these was Josiah Wedgwood, who became a close friend of Darwin in 1765 while campaigning for the building of the Trent and Mersey Canal and subsequently closely modelled his large new pottery factory at Etruria, Staffordshire on Boulton's Soho Manufactory. Another new recruit, Richard Lovell Edgeworth, met Darwin, Small and Boulton in 1766 through a shared interest in carriage design, and he in turn introduced his friend and fellow Rousseau-admirer Thomas Day, with whom he had studied at Corpus Christi College, Oxford. In 1767 James Keir visited Darwin in Lichfield, where he was introduced to Boulton, Small, Wedgwood and Whitehurst and subsequently decided to move to Birmingham.

The Lunar Circle also attracted more distant involvement. Joseph Priestley, then living in Leeds and a close friend of John Michell, became associated with the Society in 1767 when Darwin and Wedgwood became involved with his work on electricity. In the same year James Watt visited Birmingham on the recommendation of his business patron John Roebuck, being shown around the Soho Manufactory by Small and Darwin in Boulton's absence. Although neither Priestley nor Watt were to move to Birmingham for several years, both were to be in constant communication with the Birmingham members and central to the circle's activities from 1767.

By 1768 the core group of nine individuals who would form the nucleus of the Lunar Society had come together with Small at their heart. The group at this time is sometimes referred to as the "Lunar circle", though this is a later description used by historians, and the group themselves used a variety of less specific descriptions, including "Birmingham Philosophers" or simply "fellow-schemers".

=== The Lunar Society 1775–1780 ===
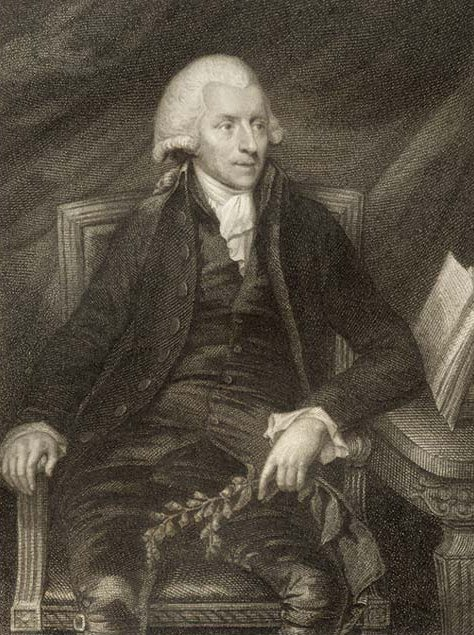
William Withering

If William Small's arrival in 1765 had been the catalyst to the development of the Lunar Circle as a cohesive group, his death – probably from malaria – in 1775 was to mark another change in its structure. Small had been the key link between the members, and in his absence those remaining moved to place the group on a more organised footing. Meetings were to be held on the Sunday nearest the full moon, lasting from two o'clock in the afternoon until eight o'clock in the evening. The first was probably that held on 31 December 1775, and the "Lunar" name is first recorded in 1776.

The era also saw significant changes in membership. William Withering – like Small, a physician – was already an acquaintance of Darwin, Boulton and Wedgwood when he moved from Stafford to Birmingham and became a member of the Society in 1776. John Whitehurst's move to London in 1775 had a less dramatic effect: he kept in regular contact with other members of the society and remained an occasional attender of meetings.

The leading figure behind the establishment of the society as a more organised body during this early period seems to have been Matthew Boulton: his home at Soho House in Handsworth was the principal venue for meetings, and in 1776 he is recorded as planning "to make many Motions to the Members respecting new Laws, and regulations, such as will tend to prevent the decline of a society which I hope will be lasting." This reliance on Boulton was also to prove a weakness, however, as the period coincided with the peak of his work building up his steam engine business and he was frequently absent. Although the 1770s was one of the society's richest eras in terms of its collaborative achievements, the society's meetings declined from regular occurrences in 1775 to infrequent ones by the end of the decade.

=== Heyday of the Society 1780–1789 ===
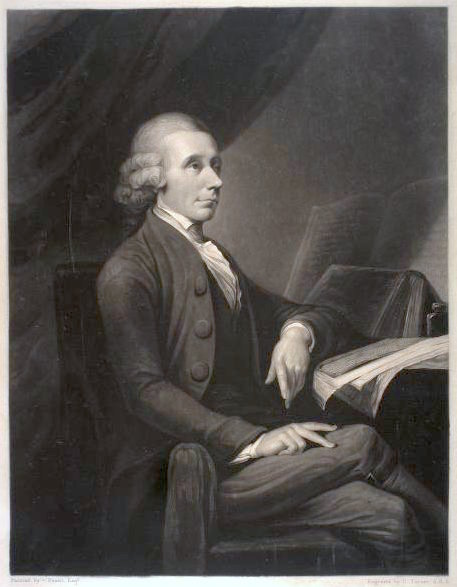
Joseph Priestley, c. 1783

In late 1780 the nature of the society was to change again with the move to Birmingham of Joseph Priestley. Priestley had been closely associated with the group's activities for over a decade and was a strong advocate of the benefits of scientific societies. Shortly after his arrival Lunar meetings moved from Sunday afternoons to Mondays to accommodate Priestley's duties as a clergyman, while the society's dependence on Matthew Boulton was lessened by holding meetings at other members' houses in addition to Soho House. The result was to be the society's most productive era.

Several other major new figures became associated with the society during this period. Samuel Galton, Jr., unusual as a Quaker who was also a gun-manufacturer, appears in the letters of other Lunar members as attending meetings from July 1781, and his daughter Mary Anne Schimmelpenninck was to provide one of the few first-hand accounts of the Lunar Society's activities. The botanist and physician Jonathan Stokes, who had known William Withering as a child, moved to Stourbridge and started attending Lunar Society meetings from 1783. His contribution to the society was significant but short-lived: after collaborating with Withering on his Botanical Arrangement of British Plants the two quarrelled bitterly and Stokes severed his relations with the main Lunar members by 1788.

The society also lost several major figures over the period: Richard Lovell Edgeworth ceased regular involvement in the society's activities when he returned to Ireland in 1782, John Whitehurst died in London in 1788, and Thomas Day died the following year. Most significantly, Erasmus Darwin moved to Derby in 1781, but although he complained of being "cut off from the milk of science", he continued to attend Lunar Society meetings at least until 1788.

=== Decline 1789–1813 ===
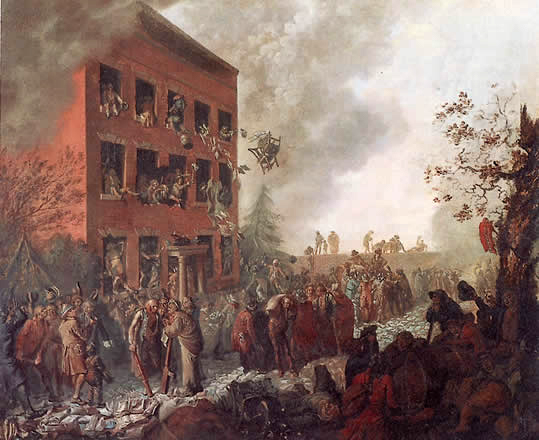
The Priestley riots of 1791

The outbreak of the French Revolution in 1789 caused political strains between members of the society, but it was the Priestley riots of 1791 in Birmingham itself that saw a decisive falling off of the society's spirit and activities. Joseph Priestley himself was driven from the town, leaving England entirely for the United States in 1794, William Withering's house was invaded by rioters and Matthew Boulton and James Watt had to arm their employees to protect the Soho Manufactory. Lunar meetings were continued by the younger generation of the families of earlier Lunar members, including Gregory Watt, Matthew Robinson Boulton, Thomas Wedgwood and James Watt junior, and possibly Samuel Tertius Galton. Regular meetings are recorded into the nineteenth century – eight in 1800, five or six before August 1801 and at least one in 1802, while as late as 1809 Leonard Horner was describing "the remnant of the Lunar Society" as being "very interesting". While individual members continued to produce work of importance, however, the collaborative activity that marked the heyday of the society was noticeably absent.

The society had definitely collapsed by 1813, however: in August of that year Samuel Galton, Jr. is recorded as having won a ballot for possession of the scientific books from the society's library.

== Modern Lunar Societies ==
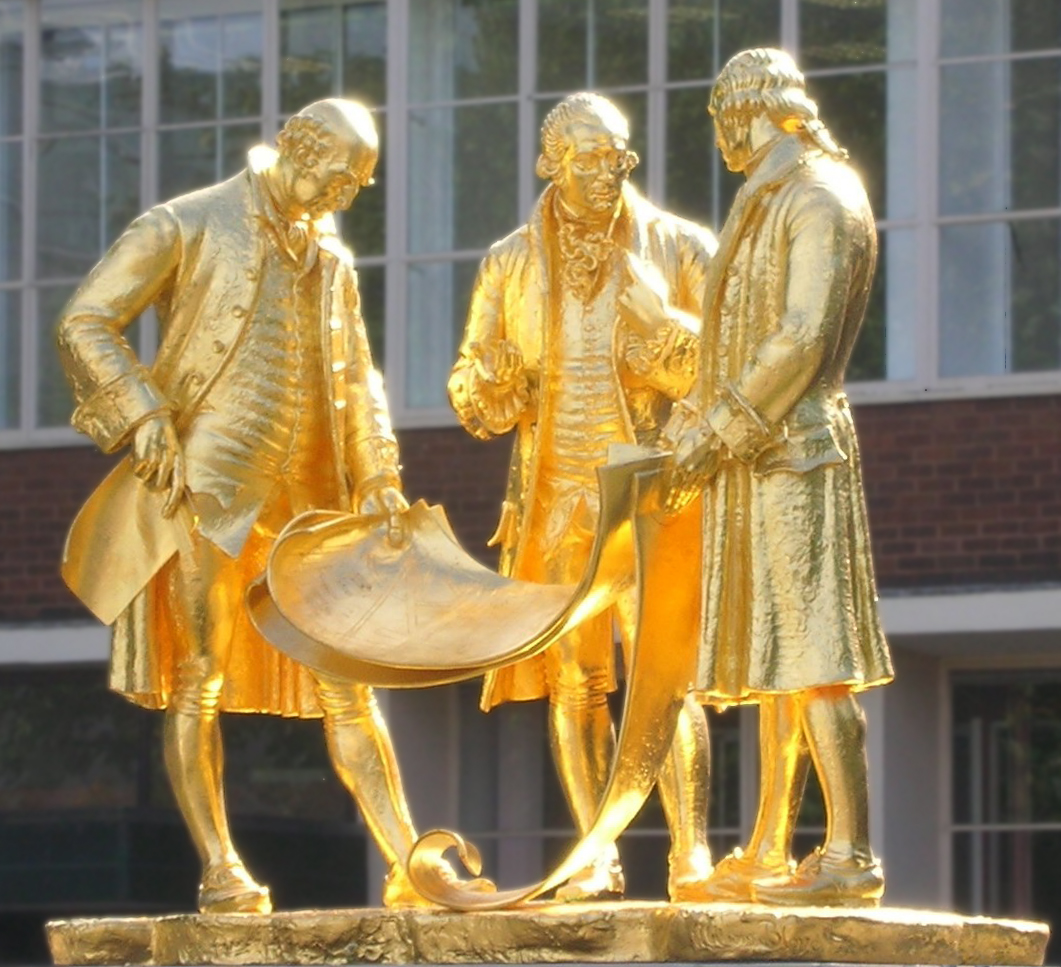
William Bloye's gold-covered statue Boulton, Watt and Murdoch, in central Birmingham

Among memorials to the Society and its members are the Moonstones; two statues of Watt and a statue of Boulton, Watt and Murdoch by William Bloye; and the museum at Soho House – all in Birmingham.

A new Lunar Society was formed in Birmingham by a group led by Dame Rachel Waterhouse. Its aim was to play a leading part in the development of the city and the wider region. Clive Stone was elected as Chair of the Lunar Society in July 2023. The society was still in operation in 2024.

Outside Birmingham

In Australia, The Lunaticks Society of Newcastle was formed by leading digital entrepreneurs, software developers, educators, film producers, creatives, investors to encourage creative thinking and new ideas in a digital age.

=== University of Birmingham Lunar Society ===
In the latter part of the 20th century, the University of Birmingham Lunar Society met every Thursday to debate and discuss all manner of topics in the Guild bar. In 2011, steps were undertaken to reform the discussion society as an alternative to the more regulated debate options available at the university. This was agreed by the University's Guild of Students in autumn 2012. The society now hosts symposiums every two weeks. Any member has always been welcome to suggest a topic for discussion. These meetings occur in a variety of environments from University rooms to local bars. In 2013 the society attempted to change the name of one of the rooms in the Guild of Students to 'The Lunar Room' in honour of the original Birmingham Lunar Society. Like the Oxford Union, the society has always traditionally put a huge emphasis on freedom of speech. The society has similar aims to The Speculative Society of Edinburgh University. In 2019, the society was rebranded as the Devil's Advocate Society, and retained the goals of the Lunar Society whilst changing much of its branding.

Today, the society is an informal academic association open to both undergraduate and graduate students, as well as professional academics, from the University of Birmingham.

== Archives ==
Historical material related to the Lunar Society is held in multiple collections. The University of Birmingham's Cadbury Research Library holds a series of portraits of the original Lunar Society members. The Library of Birmingham holds a large collection of Joseph Priestley's publications. Both archives also hold various letters of society members.

== See also ==
- Scottish Enlightenment
- Science and invention in Birmingham
- Erasmus Darwin House
- Lunar Society Moonstones

== Bibliography ==
- Jones, Peter M. (2008), Industrial Enlightenment: Science, technology and culture in Birmingham and the West Midlands, 1760–1820, Manchester: Manchester University Press, ISBN 978-0-7190-7770-8
- King-Hele, Desmond (January 1998), "The 1997 Wilkins Lecture: Erasmus Darwin, the Lunaticks and Evolution", Notes and Records of the Royal Society of London, 52 (1): 153–180, doi:10.1098/rsnr.1998.0042, ISSN 0035-9149, JSTOR 532084, PMID 11619941, S2CID 27134915
- Musson, Albert Edward; Robinson, Eric (1969), Science and Technology in the Industrial Revolution, Manchester: Manchester University Press, ISBN 0-7190-0370-9
- Porter, Roy (2001), Enlightenment: Britain and the Creation of the Modern World, London: Penguin Books, ISBN 0-14-025028-X
- Robinson, Eric (1962), "The Lunar Society: Its Membership and Organisation", Transactions of the Newcomen Society, 35: 153–178, doi:10.1179/tns.1962.009, ISSN 0372-0187
- Schofield, Robert E. (December 1957), "The Industrial Orientation of Science in the Lunar Society of Birmingham", Isis, 48 (4), The University of Chicago Press on behalf of The History of Science Society: 408–415, doi:10.1086/348607, ISSN 0021-1753, JSTOR 227513, S2CID 144950413
- Schofield, Robert E. (1963), The Lunar Society of Birmingham : a social history of provincial science and industry in eighteenth-century England, Oxford: Clarendon Press
- Schofield, Robert E. (December 1966), "The Lunar Society of Birmingham; A Bicentenary Appraisal", Notes and Records of the Royal Society of London, 21 (2): 144–161, doi:10.1098/rsnr.1966.0015, ISSN 0035-9149, JSTOR 531065, S2CID 145397408
- Uglow, Jenny (2002), The Lunar Men: Five Friends Whose Curiosity Changed the World, London: Faber & Faber, ISBN 0-374-19440-8
- Uglow, Jenny (October 2008), "Lunar Society of Birmingham (act. c.1765–c.1800)", Oxford Dictionary of National Biography (Online ed.), Oxford University Press
