= William Small =

Scottish physician and professor (1734–1775)

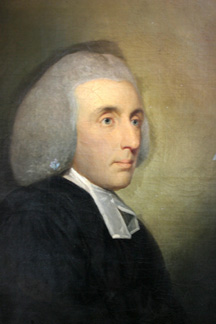
A circa 1765 portrait of Small by Tilly Kettle

William Small (1734–1775) was a Scottish physician and a professor of natural philosophy at the College of William and Mary in Williamsburg, Virginia. There he became an influential mentor of Thomas Jefferson, who went on to be a leading proponent of the American Revolution, principal author of the Declaration of Independence, and the third President of the United States. From 1765, Small was an influential medical doctor in Birmingham, England, where he was a member of the Lunar Society.

== Early life and education ==
Small was born in Carmyllie in Angus, Scotland, the son of a Presbyterian minister James Small and his wife Lillias Scott, and younger brother to Dr Robert Small. He attended Dundee Grammar School, and then Marischal College at the University of Aberdeen, where he received an MA in 1755.

== Career ==
=== Jefferson's professor ===
In 1758, he was appointed Professor of Natural Philosophy at the College of William and Mary in Williamsburg, Virginia, then one of Britain's American colonies.

Small was Thomas Jefferson's professor at the College of William & Mary, and had an influence on the young Jefferson. Small introduced Jefferson to members of Virginia society who proved influential in Jefferson's life, including George Wythe, a leading jurist in the colonies and Francis Fauquier, the Governor of Virginia.

Recalling his years as a student, Jefferson described Small as:

a man profound in most of the useful branches of science, with a happy talent of communication, correct and gentlemanly manners, and a large and liberal mind... from his conversation I got my first views of the expansion of science and of the system of things in which we are placed.

=== Return to Great Britain ===
In 1764, Small returned to Britain with a letter of introduction to Matthew Boulton from Benjamin Franklin. Through this connection with Franklin, Small helped form the Lunar Society, a club of scientists and industrialists.

In 1765, he received his MD degree and established a medical practice in Birmingham, where he shared a house with fellow physician John Ash, the chief campaigner for the Birmingham infirmary. Small was Boulton's physician and became a close friend of Erasmus Darwin, Thomas Day, James Keir, James Watt, Anna Seward, and others connected with the Lunar Society. Small was among the most popular members of the society and an active contributor to the society's debates. Small particularly helped James Watt (a fellow Scotsman), who had patented his new steam engine condenser in 1769 but found the precision required in the manufacture of the cylinder was not available. Small approached Coalbrookdale but the cylinder they provided was found to be wanting, and then approached John Wilkinson who devised the solution in 1774. Small helped with the bill to extend James Watt's patent to 1800, and on its success it was intended he would become a partner in the Boulton & Watt venture though he died just before the patent extension was granted.

Small helped to bring the Theatre Royal to Birmingham in 1774 and, together with Ash, was involved in planning and building Birmingham General Hospital, which was completed in 1779.

== Death ==
Small died in Birmingham on 25 February 1775 from malaria contracted during his stay in Virginia and was interred in St. Philip's churchyard in Birmingham.

== Legacy ==
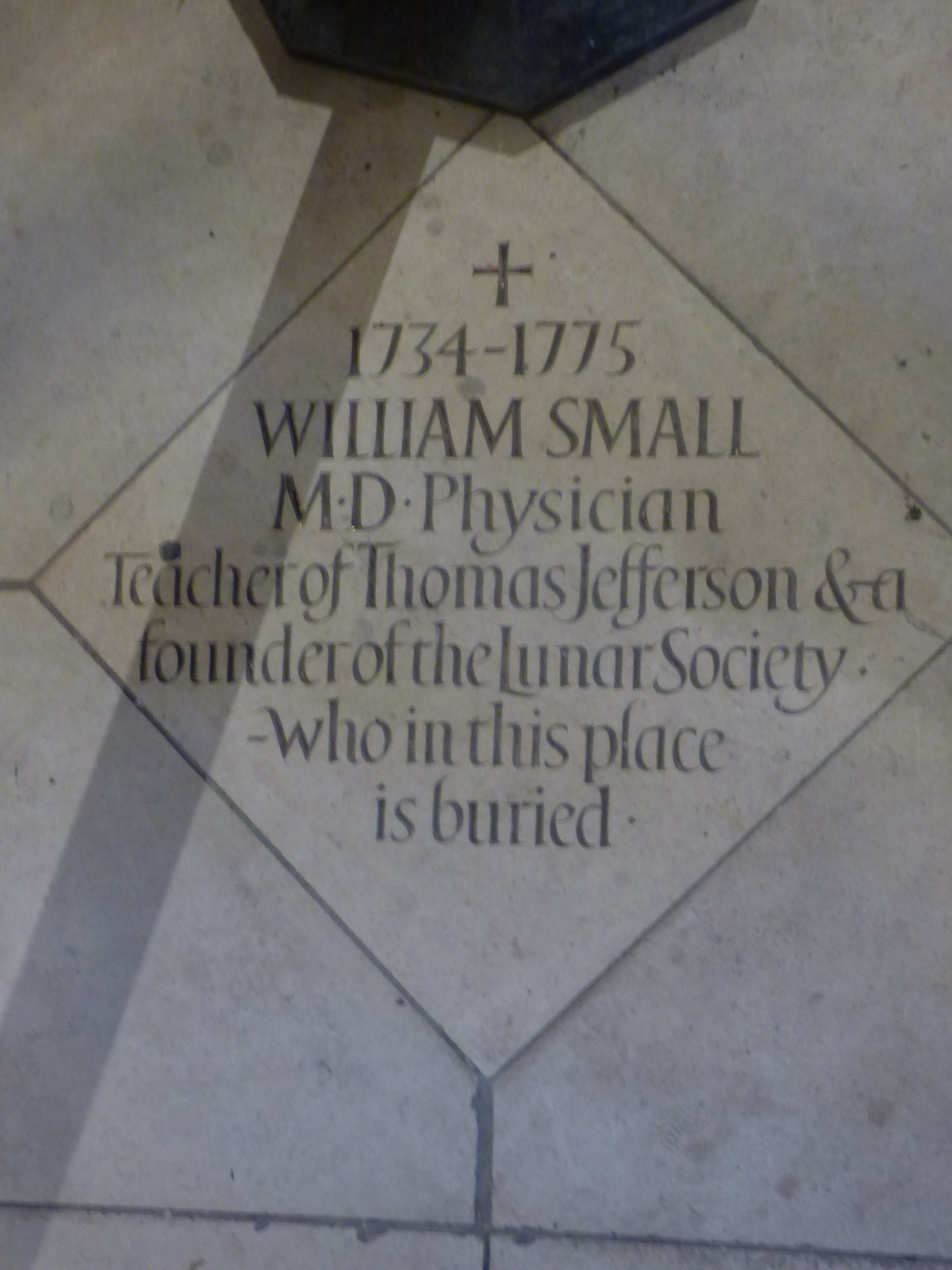
A memorial to Small in Birmingham Cathedral

The William Small Physical Laboratory, which houses the Physics Department at the College of William & Mary in Williamsburg, Virginia, is named in Small's honour.
