= Westhay Moor =

Site of Special Scientific Interest

- Site of Special Scientific Interest
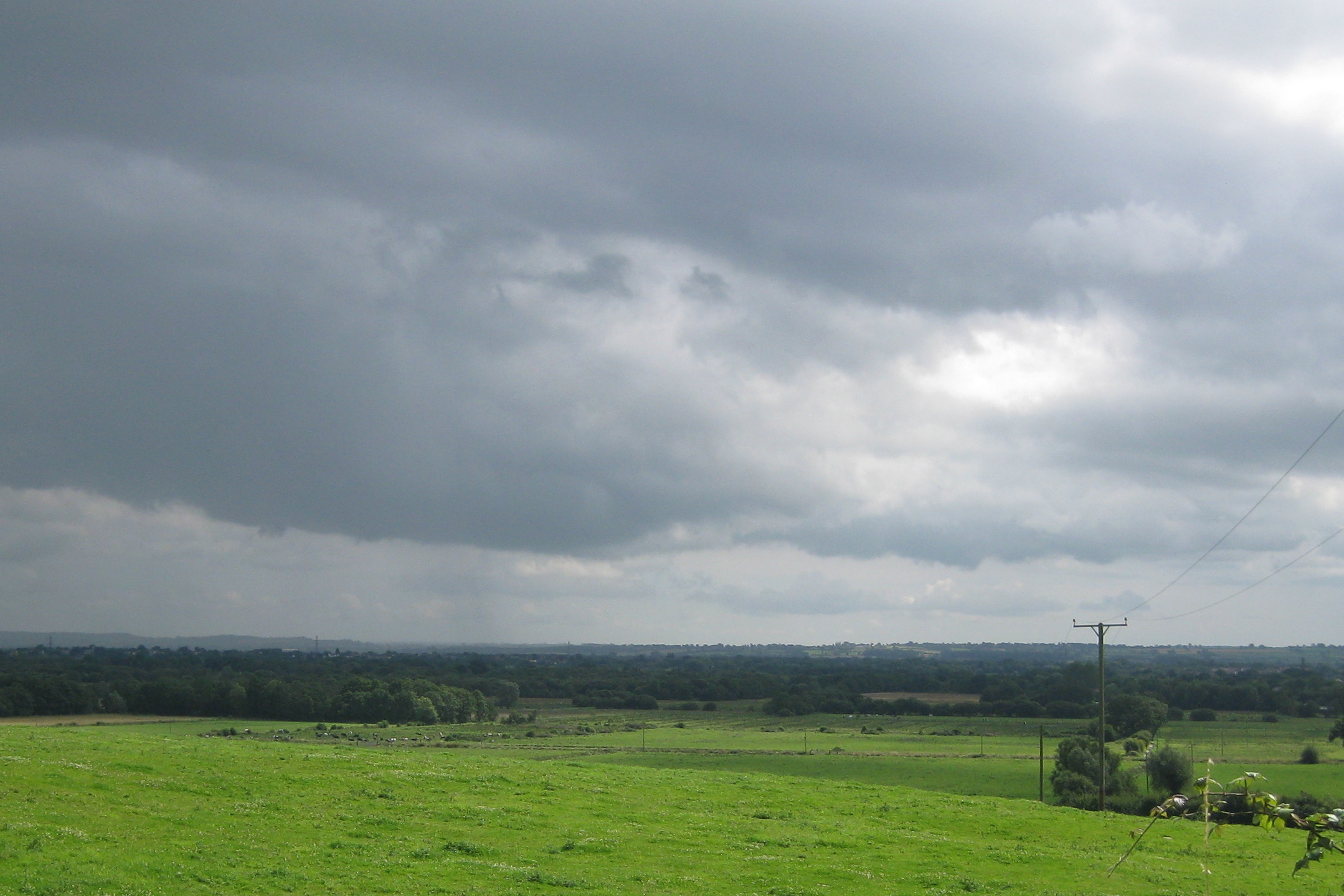
- Westhay Moor area, seen from the north

- Location within Somerset
- Location of Westhay Moor.
- Area of search: Somerset
- Grid reference: ST455445
- Coordinates: 51.19710°N 2.78136°W
- Interest: Biological
- Area: 5.137 square kilometres; 1.9833 square miles (1,269.3 acres)
- Notification date: 1971

Westhay Moor (sometimes, historically, referred to as West Hay Moor) is a 513.7-hectare (1,269-acre) biological Site of Special Scientific Interest 2.5 kilometres (1.6 mi) north-east of Westhay village and 4 kilometres (2.5 mi) from Wedmore in Somerset, England, notified in 1971. Westhay Moor is also notified as part of the Somerset Levels and Moors Special Protection Area under the EU Birds Directive and as a Ramsar site, and a National Nature Reserve.

The low-lying swampy area of Westhay Moor has had peat laid down over older rocks for the last 10,000 years. The Neolithic people lived on the areas of slightly higher ground but exploited the reed beds for materials and built wooden trackways to cross the raised bog. Peat extraction on the Somerset Levels has occurred since the area was first drained by the Romans. Measures to improve the drainage were carried out in the Middle Ages largely by Glastonbury Abbey. In the 17th and 18th centuries further drainage work was undertaken including digging a series of rhynes, or ditches and larger drainage canals. Peat extraction peaked in the 1960s but has since declined.

The geology of the moor and prolonged peat extraction has provided a unique environment which provides a habitat for a range of flora and fauna. Much of the nature reserve managed by the Somerset Wildlife Trust is based around abandoned peatworkings which have now become flooded. It is particularly noted for the millions of starlings which roost at the site in winter.

== Location ==
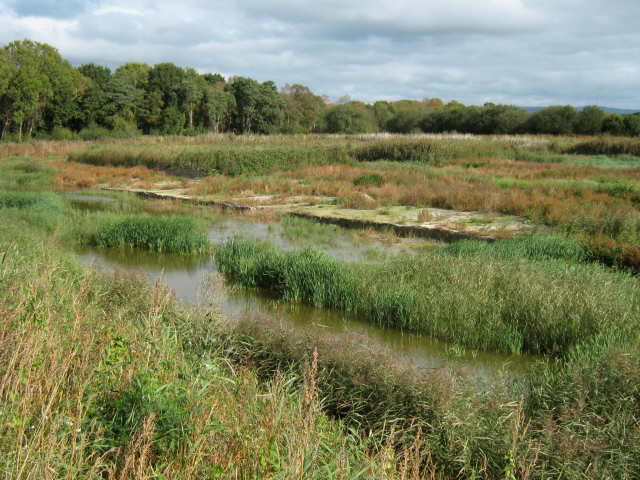
Peat bog at Westhay

Although underlain by much older Triassic age formations that protrude to form what would once have been islands—such as Athelney, Brent Knoll, Burrow Mump and Glastonbury Tor, which is composed of Blue Lias, the lowland landscape was formed only during the last 10,000 years, following the end of the last ice age. As the sea level changed following the Pliocene era, vegetation was laid down which was later converted into peat. The peak of the peat formation took place in swamp conditions around 6,000 years ago, although in some areas it continued into medieval times.

Westhay Moor forms part of the Somerset Levels and Moors which is important for its grazing and ditch system, and is crossed by the River Brue and Galton's Canal. Over much of the moor, the water table is high throughout the year with extensive winter flooding occurring regularly. The level of the water tables can be artificially lowered during active working of the peat excavations, but for much of the year these are often filled with water.

== History ==
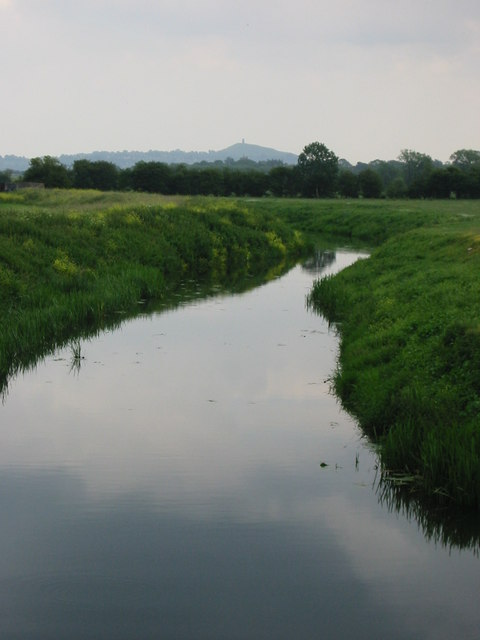
The River Brue at Westhay

Westhay Moor originally lay at the centre of the most northerly of the two lowland raised bogs that formed in the lower Brue Valley. They reached their greatest extent at the end of the Iron Age. The Neolithic people exploited the reedswamps for their natural resources and started to construct wooden trackways such as the Sweet and Post Tracks. The Sweet Track, named after the peat digger who discovered it in 1970 and dating from the 3800s BCE, is the world's oldest timber trackway, once thought to be the world's oldest engineered roadway. The track was built between what was in the early 4th millennium BCE an island at Westhay and a ridge of high ground at Shapwick, close to the River Brue. The remains of similar tracks have been uncovered nearby, connecting settlements on the peat bog including the Honeygore, Abbotts Way, Bells, Bakers, Westhay and Nidons trackways. The archaeology, history and geology of the Somerset Levels was displayed at the Peat Moors Centre until its closure in 2009. The centre also included reconstructions of some of the archaeological discoveries, including a number of Iron Age round houses from Glastonbury Lake Village, and the Sweet Track.

The eastern part of the moor was covered by Meare Pool which was formed by water ponding-up behind the raised peat bogs between the Wedmore and the Polden Hills, and coring has shown that it is filled with at least 2 metres (6.6 ft) of detritus mud, mainly dating from the Subatlantic climatic period (1st millennium BC). In prehistoric times there were two Meare Lake Villages situated within the lake, occupied at different times between 300 BCE and 100 CE, similar to the nearby Glastonbury Lake Village.

Early drainage work was carried out in the later years of the 12th century, with the responsibility for maintaining all the watercourses between Glastonbury and the sea being placed on named individuals among whom were Ralph de Sancta Barbara of Brentmarsh. Drainage of the surrounding area by monks of Glastonbury Abbey had reduced the size of the lake to 500 acres (200 ha) at the time of the Dissolution of the Monasteries. Meare Pool had disappeared from maps by 1749. The Meare Pool originally collected the waters of the rivers Brue and Sheppey, and discharged in a northerly direction into the Lower River Axe. In the later years of the 12th century the abbey diverted the Brue to flow westwards, perhaps largely through natural channels, from Meare Pool to join the river Parrett.

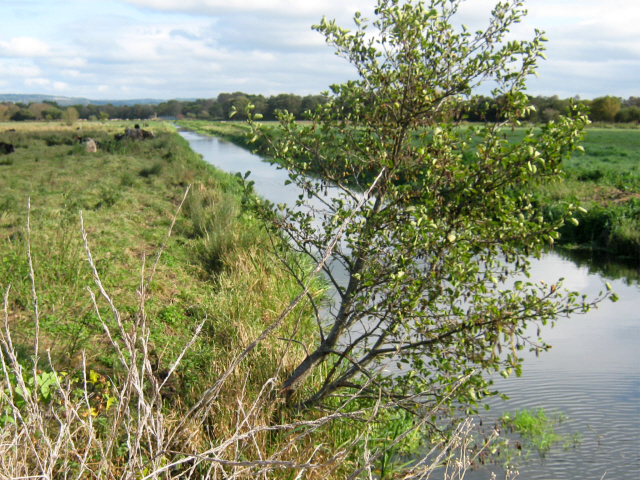
The artificial North Drain crossing the moor

In the early 17th century plans were made to drain and enclose much of Sedgemoor. Further reclamation was carried out in stages between about 1620 and 1740, with the "new Cutts" (or Decoy Rhyne) being built about 1660. The rivers Sheppey and Hartlake were canalised into the River James Wear and Division Rhyne sometime in the late 1730s. In 1795, John Billingsley advocated enclosure and the digging of rhynes (a local name for drainage channels, pronounced "reens" in the east and rhyne to the west) between plots, and wrote in his Agriculture of the County of Somerset that 18 square kilometres (4,400 acres) had been enclosed in the last 20 years in Wedmore and Meare, 1.4 square kilometres (350 acres) at Nyland, 3.64 square kilometres (900 acres) at Blackford, 8 square kilometres (2,000 acres) at Mark, 0.4 square kilometres (100 acres) in Shapwick, and 7 square kilometres (1,700 acres) at Westhay.

In the 1810s Samuel Galton Jr. showed that bogs could be drained and dressed with clay and other soil, and built Galton's Canal. The character of the soil was also changed by the spreading of clay and silt from the digging of King's Sedgemoor Drain. Galton's Canal was a 2.2-kilometre (1.4 mi) canal with one lock, connecting the River Brue to the North Drain. It was operational by 1822, and ceased to be used after the 1850s. The land is drained by a series of rhynes, or ditches with water levels (and hence the level of the water table) being controlled by a system of sluice gates and pumps. The water resource management operations are managed by the Somerset internal drainage board.

In the early 18th century several duck decoys were built on the moor. These consisted of a pool of water leading from which are from one to eight curving, tapering ditches. Over each ditch is a series of hoops, initially made from wood, later from iron, which diminish in size as the ditch tapers. The hoops are covered in netting. The combination of ditch and net-covered hoops is known as a pipe.

=== Peat extraction ===
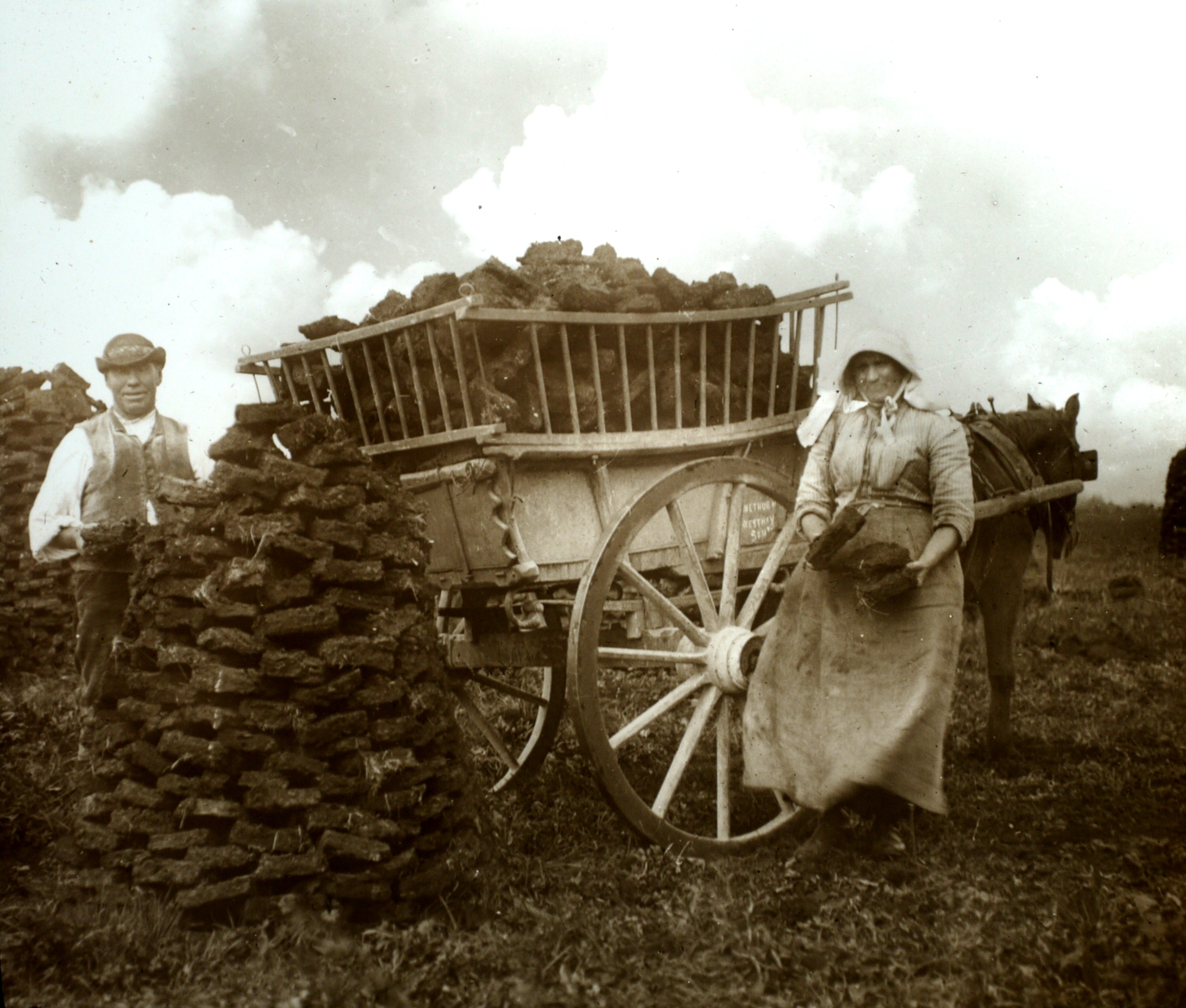
Peat gatherers at Westhay in 1905.

Large areas of peat were laid down on the Somerset Levels, particularly in the River Brue Valley, during the Quaternary period after the ice sheets melted. Peat extraction on the Somerset Levels has occurred since the area was first drained by the Romans. The raised bogs were extensively dug for peat for use as fuel up until the end of World War II after which the primary market was for horticulture. Large parts of Westhay Moor have now been dug back to the underlying clay exposing estuarine deposits dating from about 6000 BP before isolation from the sea and peat formation began. The introduction of plastic packaging in the 1950s allowed the peat to be packed without rotting, which led to the industrialisation of peat extraction during the 1960s as a major market in horticultural peat was developed. However, the resultant reduction in water levels that resulted put local ecosystems at risk; peat wastage in pasture fields was occurring at rates of 0.3–0.9 metres (1–3 ft) over 100 years.

In 1970 the Somerset Wildlife Trust bought the first part of the last 12 hectares (30 acres) of acid raised bog vegetation left on the Somerset Moors undamaged by peat digging or agriculture. Since then SWT have bought or been given 100-hectare (250-acre) of former peatworkings. These were sculpted and restored to wetland as the experimental area for the Avalon Marshes. This was the term given in the late 1980s to describe the wetland restored from peat workings in the Brue Valley. The wetland on the clay is dominated by Phragmites reed, catstail and open water. The wetland restoration has been a great success and was declared a National Nature Reserve in 1995. Peat working is now beginning to draw to a close on Westhay Moor and the majority of the remaining peatworkings are now being restored to wetland as they are completed. In 2014 two land owners unsuccessfully appealed against changes in planning permission which removed their rights to dig peat from Westhay Moor.

== Ecology ==
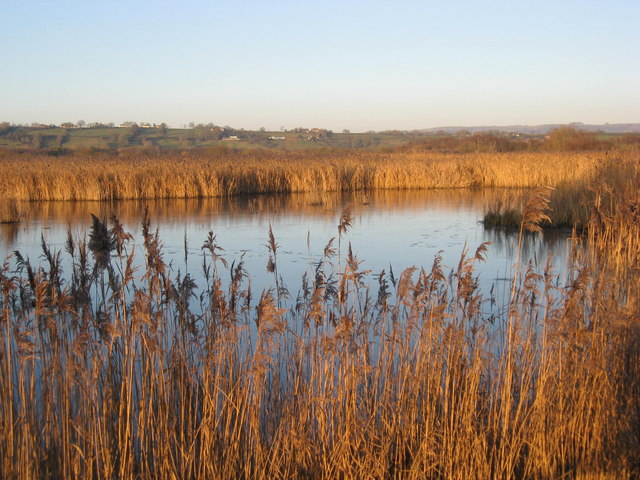
Flooded peat workings at the Westhay Moor National Nature Reserve.

Westhay Moor supports a nationally outstanding community of terrestrial and aquatic invertebrates. At least 28 nationally notable invertebrate species also occur on the moor. The meadows, ditches, abandoned peat workings and hedgerows provide suitable breeding habitats for a diverse and nationally important breeding bird community.

It is part of the Brue Valley Living Landscape conservation project. The project commenced in January 2009 and aims to restore, recreate and reconnect habitats; joining together protected areas into a network to enable plant and animal movement. It aims to ensure that wildlife is enhanced and capable of sustaining itself in the face of climate change while guaranteeing farmers and other landowners can continue to use their land profitably. It is one of an increasing number of landscape scale conservation projects in the UK.

Part of the moor has been designated as a nature reserve, covering 106 hectares (261 acres), which is managed by the Somerset Wildlife Trust. In addition to open water and reedbeds, it contains a fragment of acid mire, the largest to have survived in the south west of England. The reserve provides habitat for many varieties of birds, which includes millions of starlings between November and January, along with bittern and migrating ospreys. Otters and banded demoiselles are among other species which have made their home on the moor. A large bird hide, reached via a raised boardwalk, has been erected. Westhay Moor is also notified as part of the Somerset Levels and Moors Special Protection Area under the EU Birds Directive and as a Ramsar site, and a National Nature Reserve.
