= Galton's Canal =

Canal in the United Kingdom

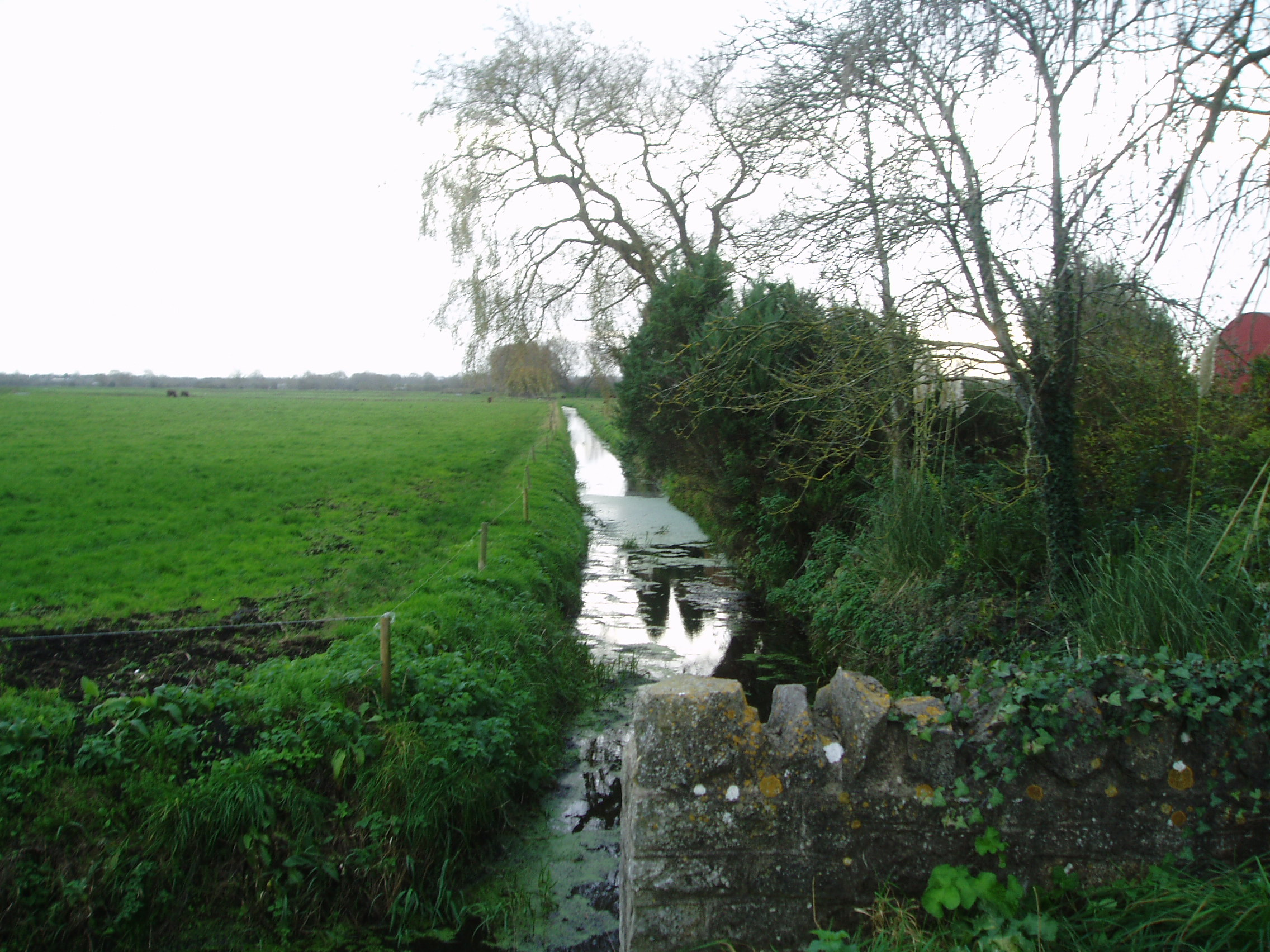
- The canal viewed from Westhay Moor Drove
- Interactive map of Galton's Canal

Specifications
- Locks: 1

History
- Original owner: Samuel Galton
- Principal engineer: Richard Hammett
- Date of act: 1801
- Date of first use: 1822
- Date closed: 1850s

Geography
- Start point: River Brue, Meare
- End point: North Drain
- Connects to: River Brue

Galton's Canal was a 1-mile 3 furlong (2.2 km) canal with one lock, crossing Westhay Moor in Somerset, England, and connecting the River Brue to the North Drain. It was operational by 1822, and ceased to be used after the 1850s.

== History ==
Few details of the canal have survived, and the main source of information about it comes from a paper submitted to the Journal of the Royal Agricultural Society of England by Erasmus Galton, and published in 1845. The journal was chosen because the main purpose of the canal was the improvement of a peat bog, to provide agricultural land. In 1811, Samuel Galton Jr., a financier from Duddeston, in Birmingham, owned 300 acres (120 ha) of peat bog in the parish of Meare, which formed part of Westhay Moor. The moor had been split up into tenements by an act of Parliament in 1790, but most of it remained unimproved, and was only suitable for the cutting of turf, which was used as a fuel.

Samuel Galton set out to improve his holding, and the project was managed by his agent, a Mr. Richard Hammett, who came from the village of Street. Hammett would later provide the initial survey of the Glastonbury Canal, and it was his notes that Erasmus Galton used to prepare his article. Local opinion was that such land could not be improved, because any top dressing of soil would soon sink below the peat, and the effort expended would be wasted. However, Galton believed that if the land was drained properly before top dressing began, loss of the soil did not occur, and the land remained improved. His process consisted of dividing the land into ridges, which were 40 feet (12 m) wide, and cutting ditches at both sides. Peat was moved from the edges of the ridge to its centre, and over a period of 4 to 5 years, the peat compressed, and the surface sank by around 3 or 4 feet (0.9 or 1.2 m), but was firm enough to support cattle. The cost for this first stage was given as £4 2s 6d (£4.12) per acre (£10.30 per ha).

The River Brue provided a source of soil for top dressing, as rich soil was deposited on its banks after heavy rainfall. It is not known when construction of the canal began, as Galton makes no mention of it in his article, and costs for the whole project are shown starting in 1811. However, the first carriage of soil is shown in 1822, when 90 cubic yards (69 m^{3}) passed along the canal, so it must have been finished by this time. The canal had been authorised by the Somerset Drainage Act 1801 (41 Geo. 3. (U.K.) c. lxxii). It was about 1.4 miles (2.3 km) long and 16 feet (4.9 m) wide. The section which joined the River Brue was embanked on both sides, after which there was a small lock, which raised the level of the canal to allow it to cross the moor. It joined the North Drain at the far end, and continued a little further to service land being reclaimed on the north side of the drain.

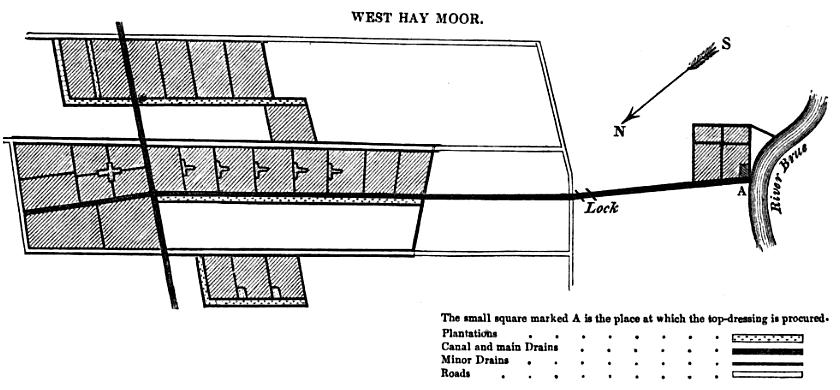
Erasmus Galton's map of 1845, showing the canal and the parts of Westhay Moor which were improved by top dressing with silt

Galton states that after draining the land, the native bog plants were soon replaced by ferns. Once the top dressing was applied, the ferns died away, to be replaced by clover and meadow grass. All of this grew naturally, as no planting was done. The soil used was largely clay or marl, and was added to a depth of 6 feet (1.8 m). Between 1811 and 1842, the last year shown in Galton's table, the cost of the project was £4770 1s 10d (£4770.09), and a total of 27,540 cubic yards (21,055 m^{3}, or approximately 33,000 tons) of soil had been moved along the canal to be deposited on the land. The boatmen were paid 7d. (3 pence) per cubic yard, for digging it out of the ground, boating it and landing it.

Galton was ordered to repair the floodbanks near to the canal by the Commissioners of Sewers in 1830. It appears to have been little used from the 1850s, and it was abandoned in 1897, when the drainage authority constructed a wall across the channel, which included a tidal flap so that water could still discharge into the river at some states of the tide. It is now incorporated into the local drainage system.

Galton's map shows three droves running parallel to the canal. To the west is Parson's Drove, and to the east are London Drove and Dagg's Lane Drove. The area between London Drove and Dagg's Lane Drove was subsequently used for peat digging, and more recently has become the Westhay Moor National Nature Reserve. It is managed by the Somerset Wildlife Trust, and as well as open water and reedbeds, it contains a fragment of acid mire, the largest to have survived in the south west of England. The reserve covers 261 acres (106 ha) and provides habitat for many varieties of birds, which includes millions of starlings between November and January.

== Points of interest ==
Point	Coordinates (Links to map resources)	OS Grid Ref	Notes
Start at River Brue	51.1797°N 2.7974°W	ST443425	
Lock	51.1845°N 2.7961°W	ST444430	
End at North Drain	51.1985°N 2.7896°W	ST449446	

== See also ==
- Canals of Great Britain
- History of the British canal system

== Bibliography ==
- Galton, Erasmus (1845). An Account of Improvement of a Shaking Bog at Meare in Somersetshire. Vol. Journal of the Royal Agricultural Society of England Volume 6. Royal Agricultural Society.
- Hadfield, Charles (1967). The Canals of South West England. David and Charles. ISBN 0-7153-4176-6.
