= Lunar Society Moonstones =

Set of nine carved stones in Queslett, England

Coordinates: 52.5526°N 1.9088°W

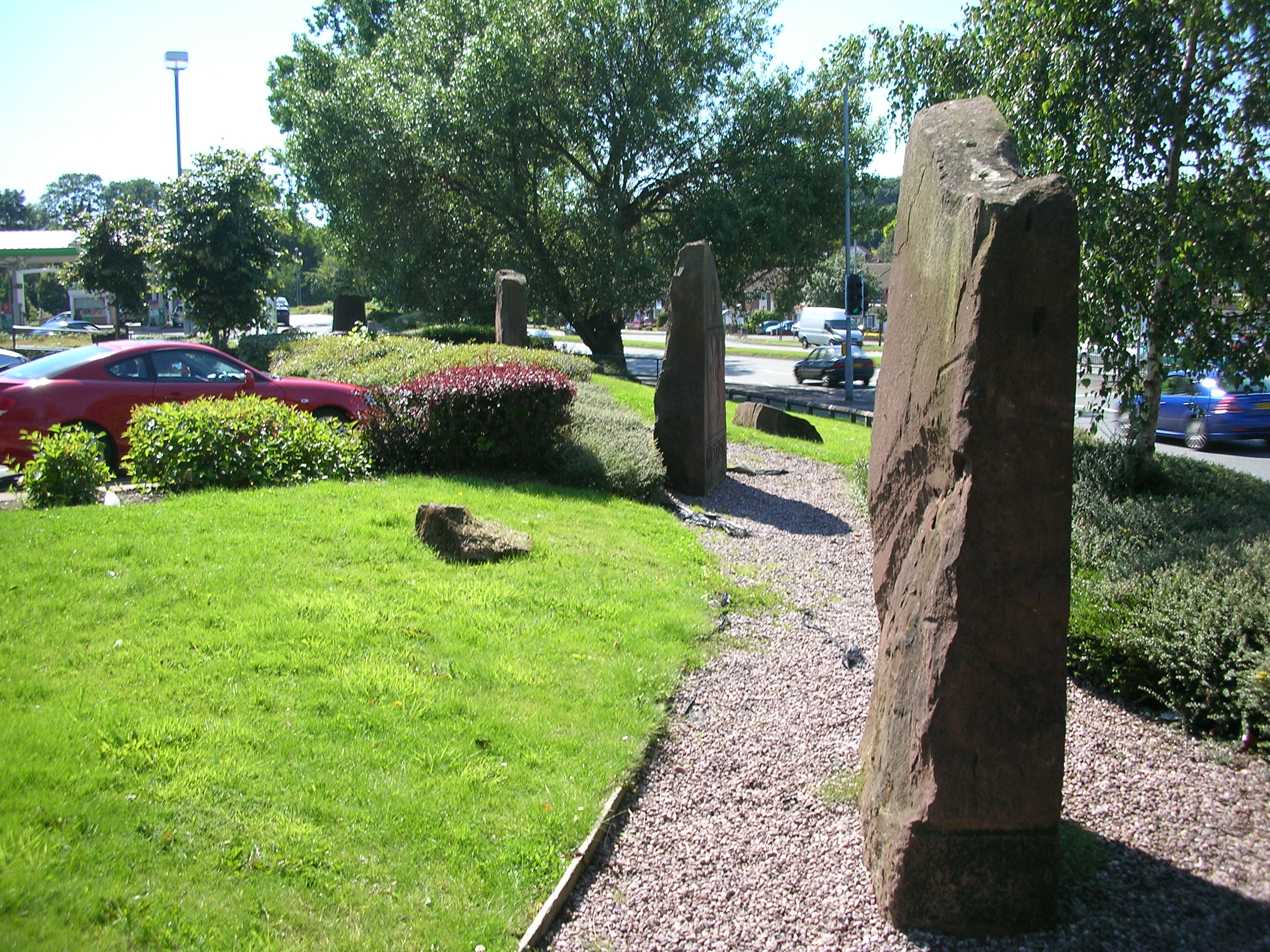
Moonstones around edge of car park

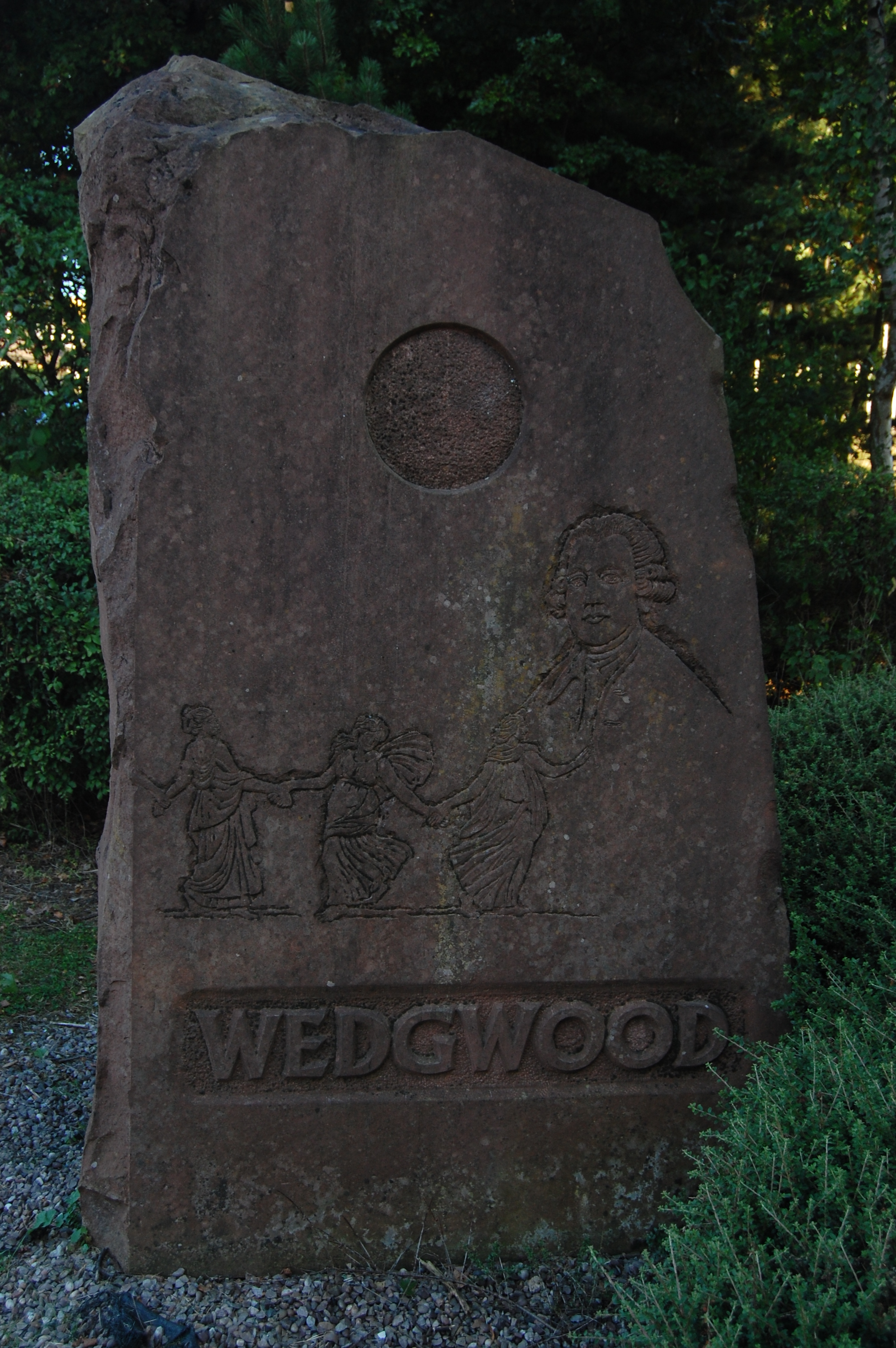
Josiah Wedgwood's stone

The Moonstones (grid reference SP062949) are a set of nine carved sandstone memorials to various members of the Lunar Society. Made in 1998, and unveiled in March 1999, they can be viewed in the grounds of the Asda supermarket in Queslett, Great Barr, Birmingham, England. They are visible from the highway, when travelling from Aldridge Road into Queslett Road, toward the Scott Arms, and face outwards from the supermarket.

They depict nine members of the Society and attributes connected with their work, in order from Aldridge Road round to Queslett Road:

- Josiah Wedgwood: portrait and three women from a jasperware design
- Erasmus Darwin: portrait and design for horizontal windmill
- Samuel Galton: colour wheel
- William Murdock: steam road locomotive
- Matthew Boulton: medal with his portrait
- James Watt: portrait and steam engine
- Joseph Priestley: laboratory equipment
- James Keir: crystals
- William Withering: foxglove, with words from his book An Account of the Foxglove and some of its Medical Uses

The stones also each have a phase of the Moon carved on them, with the Watt stone being the full moon.

The designs are by Steve Field and were executed by stonemasons Malcolm Sier and Michael Scheuermann. The rear of the Watt stone includes a carved panel crediting the artists and sponsors.

Great Barr Hall, Galton's home and a venue for meetings of the Lunar Society, is nearby.

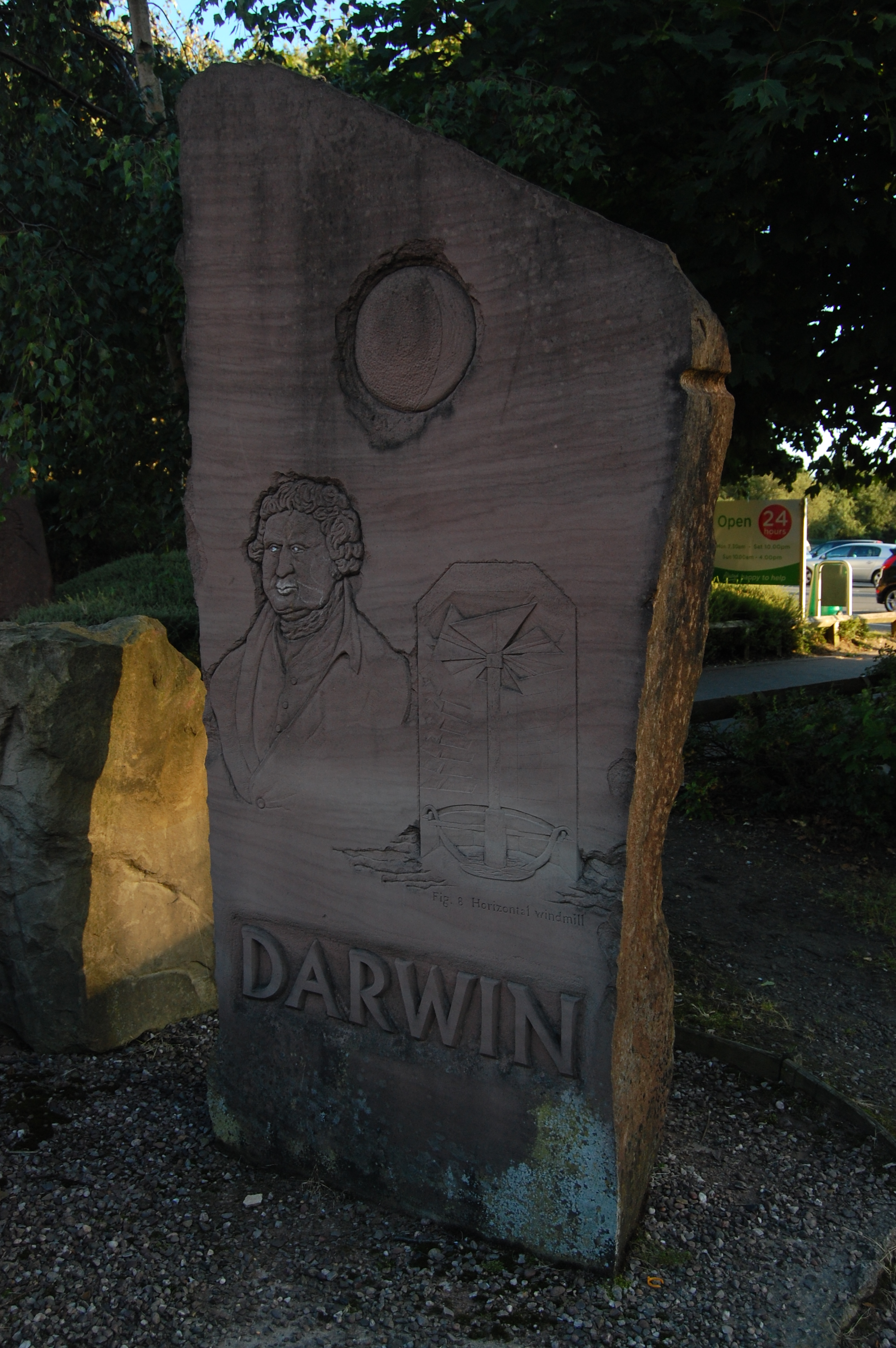
Darwin

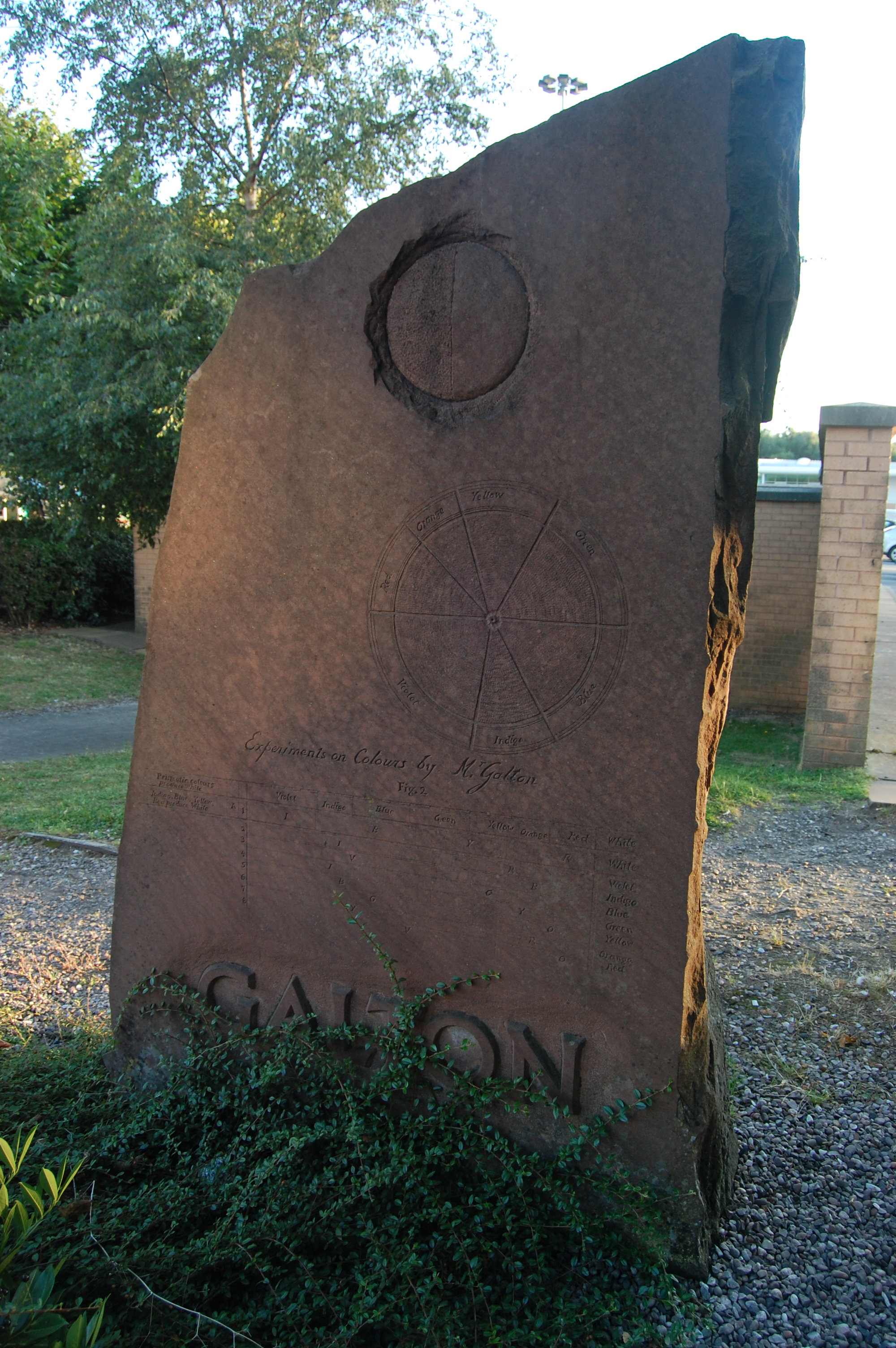
Galton

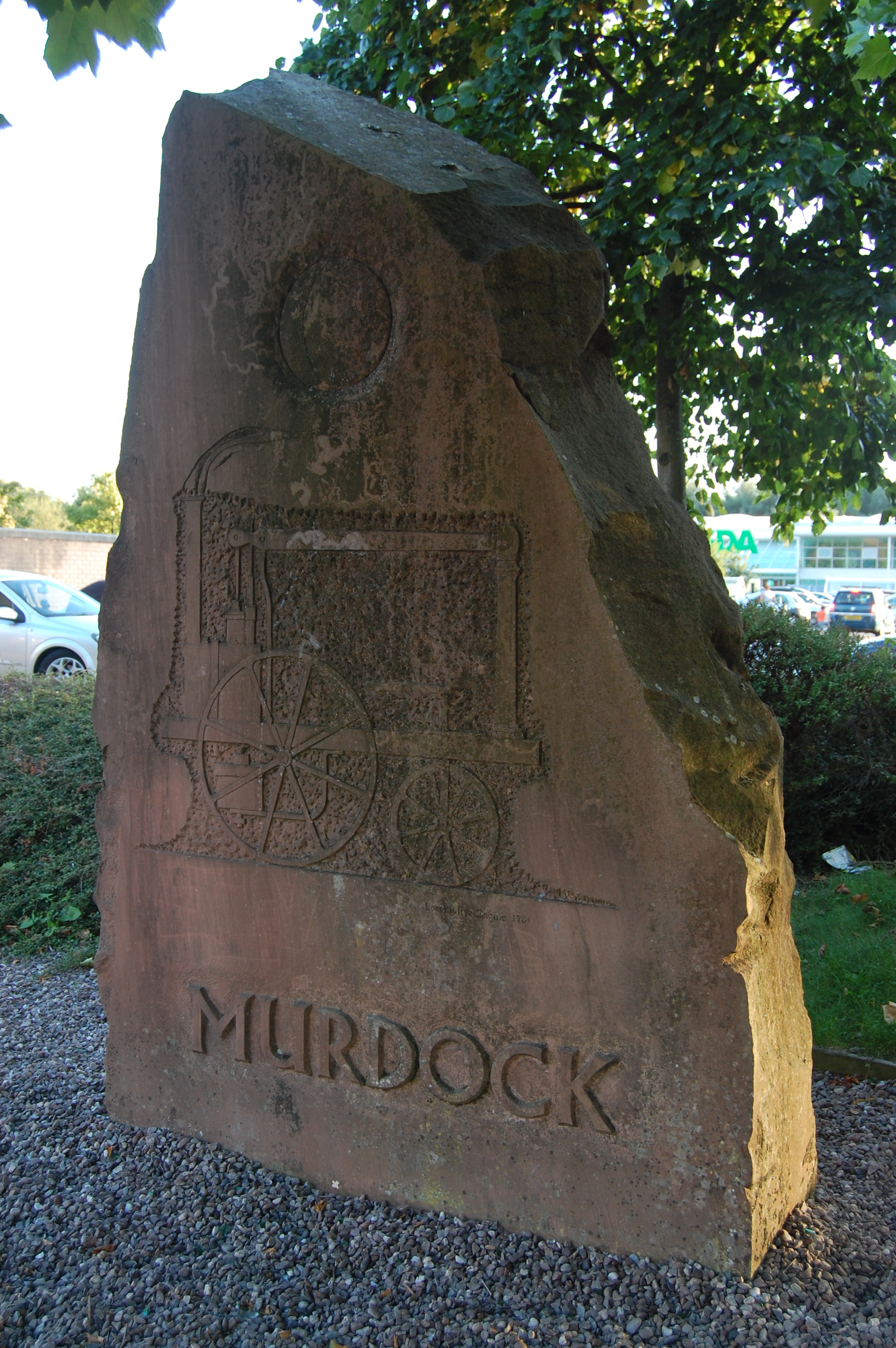
Murdock

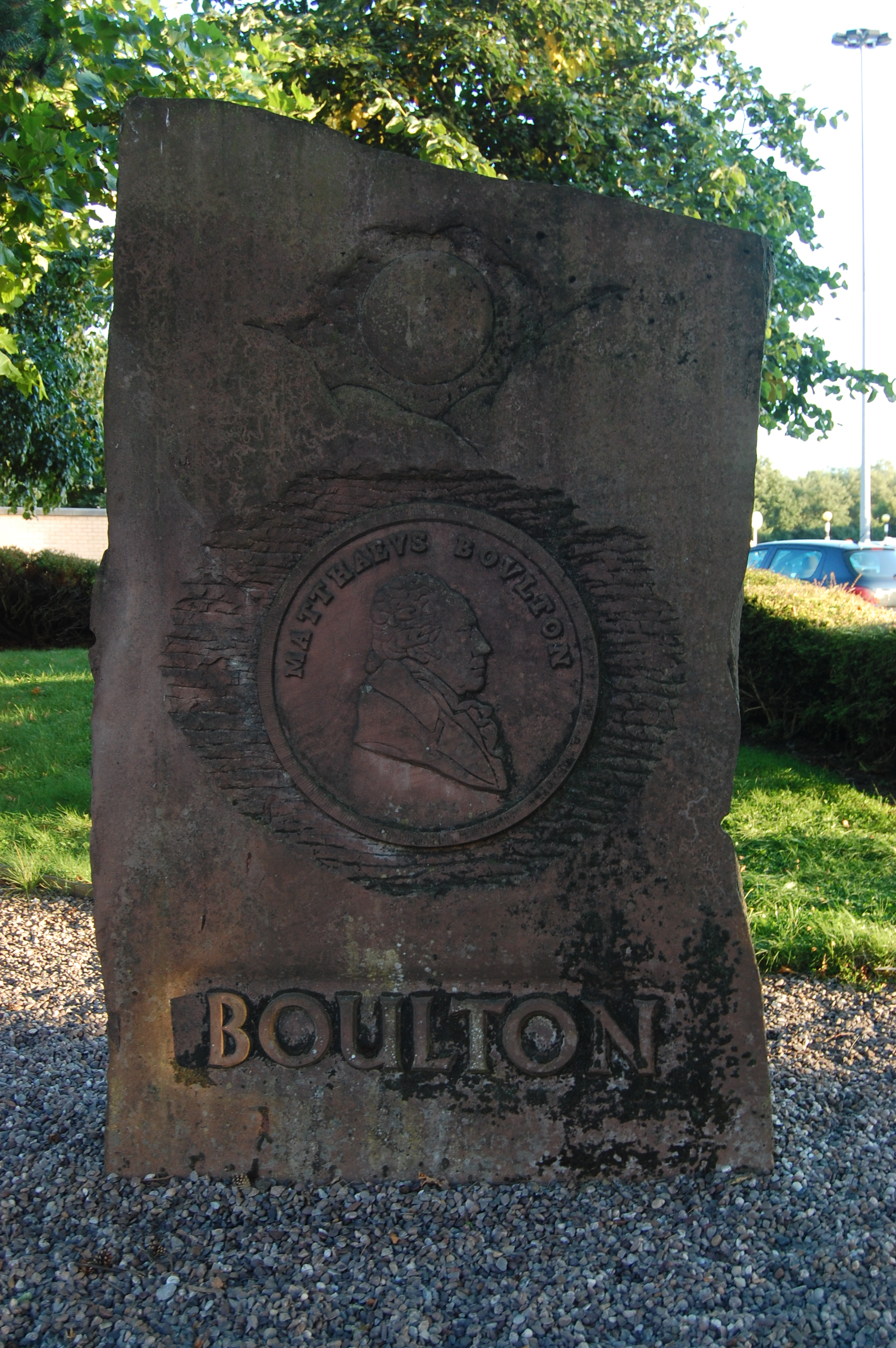
Boulton

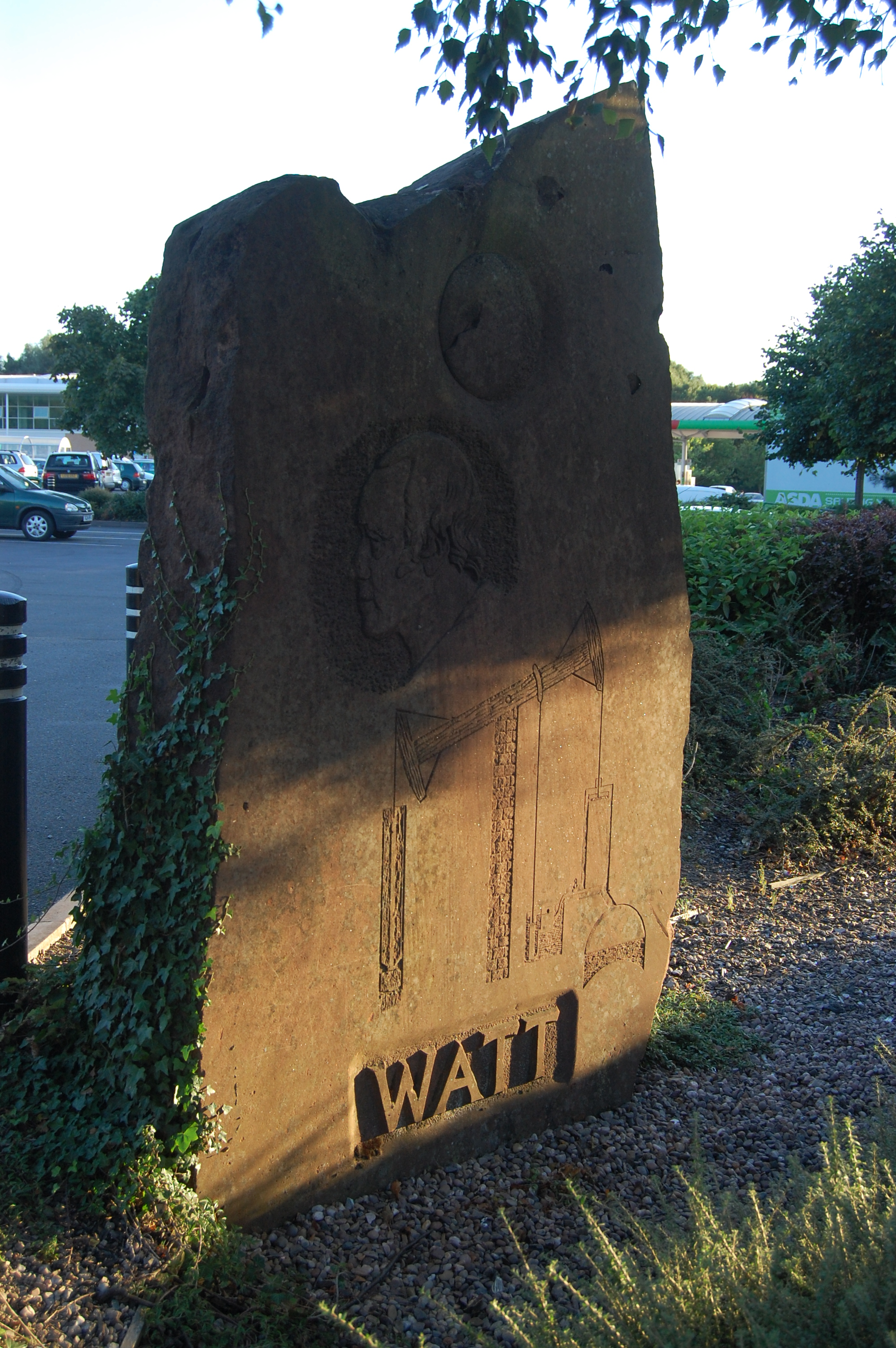
Watt

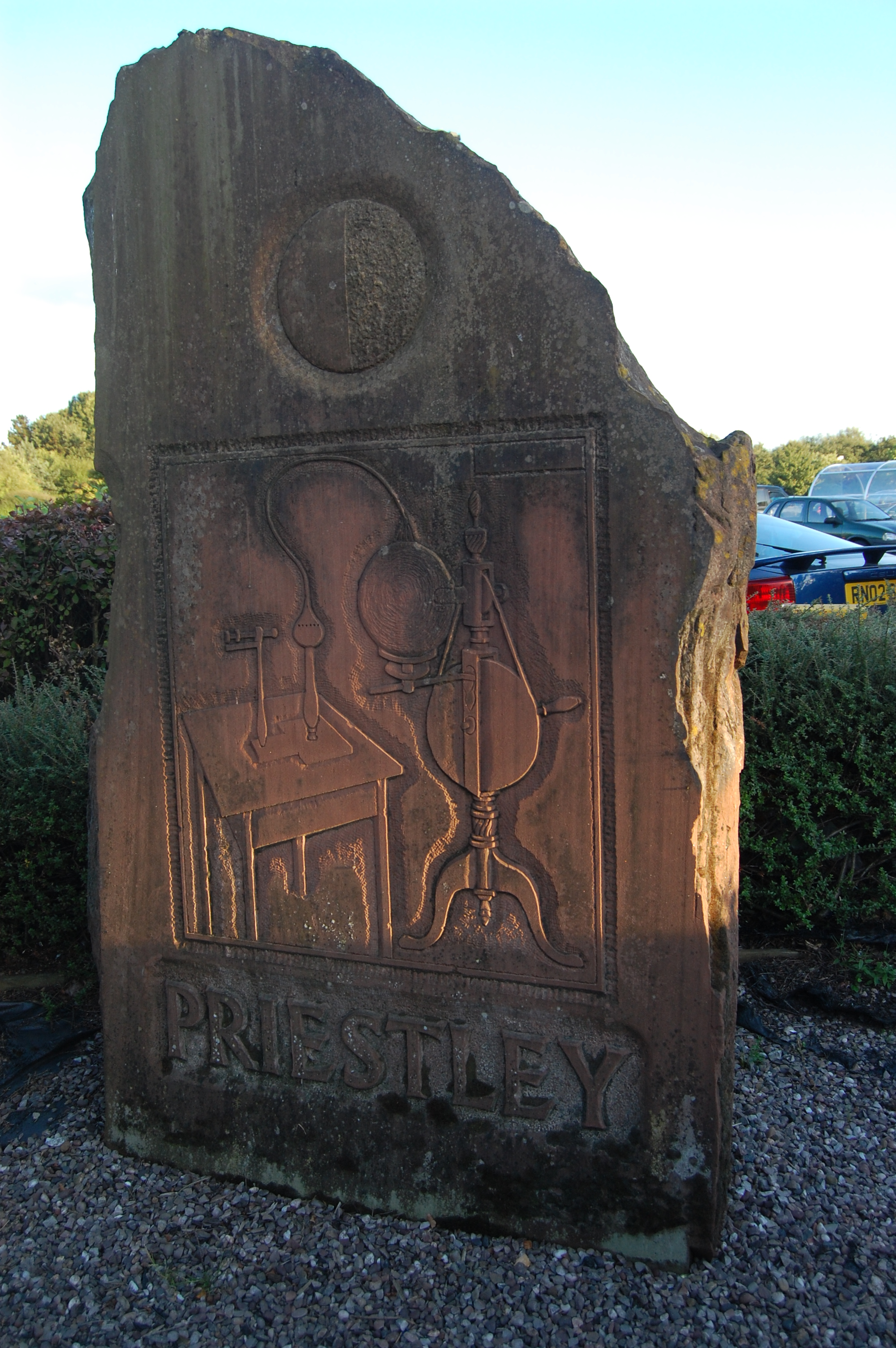
Priestley

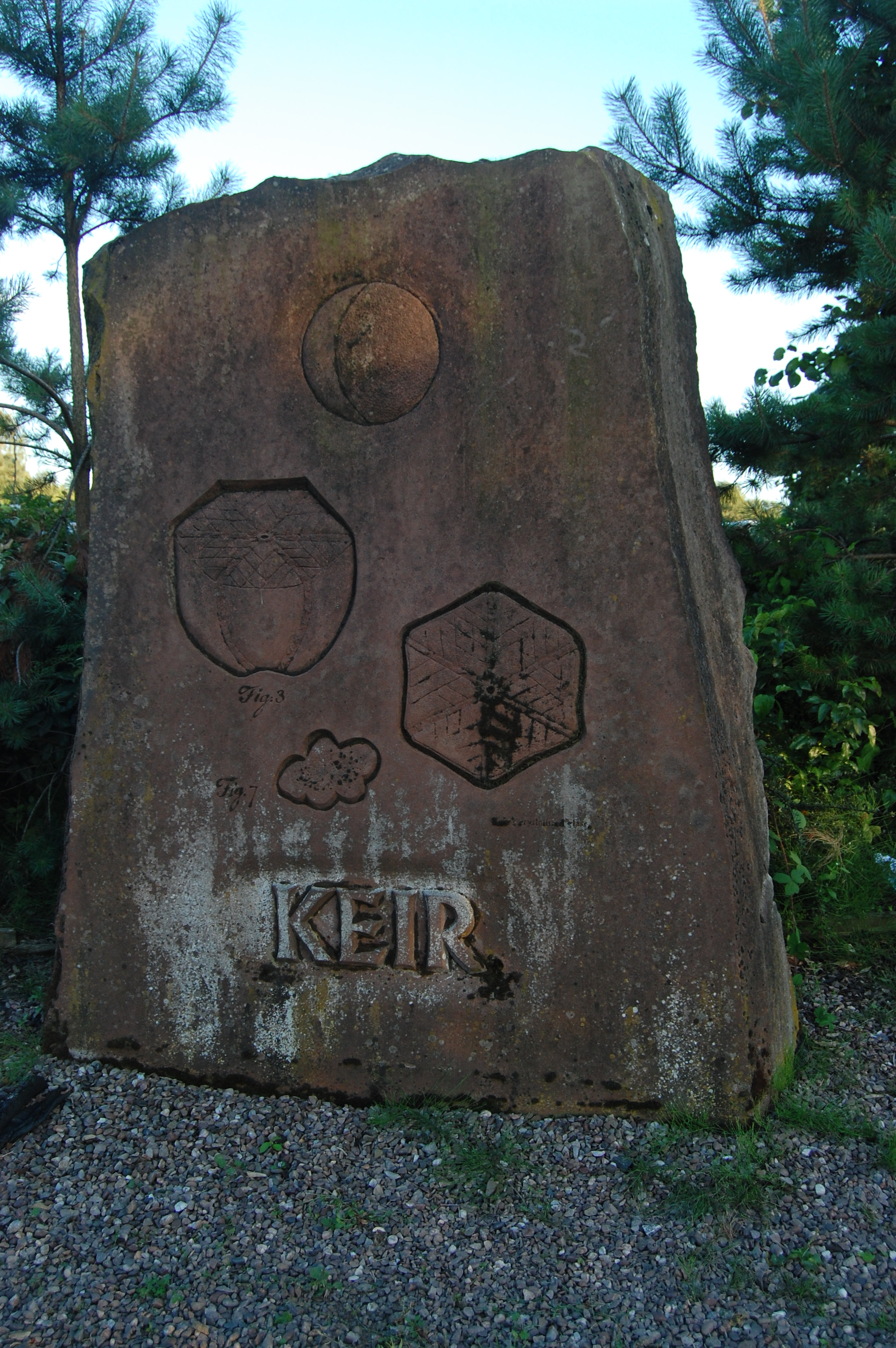
Keir

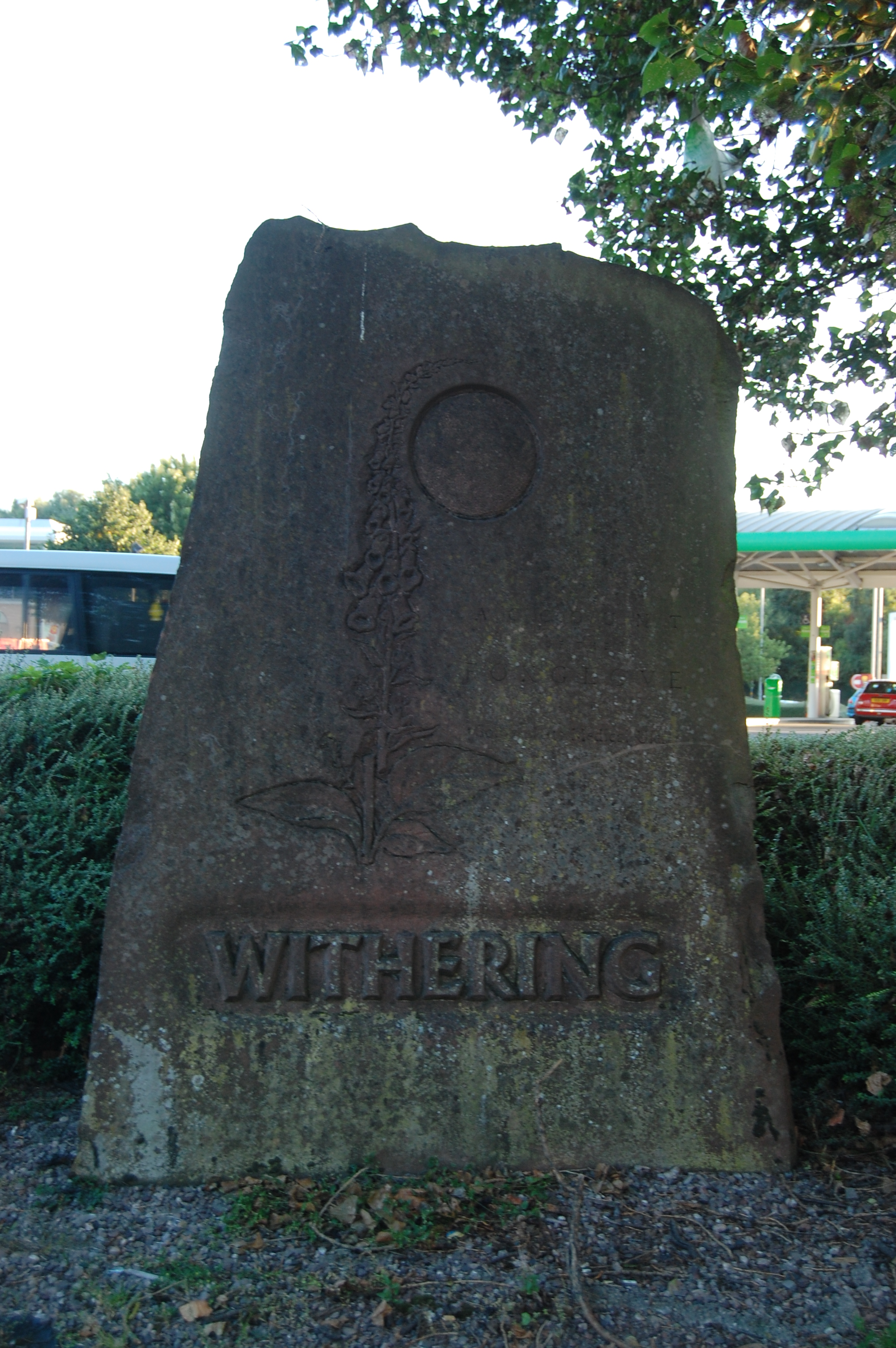
Withering

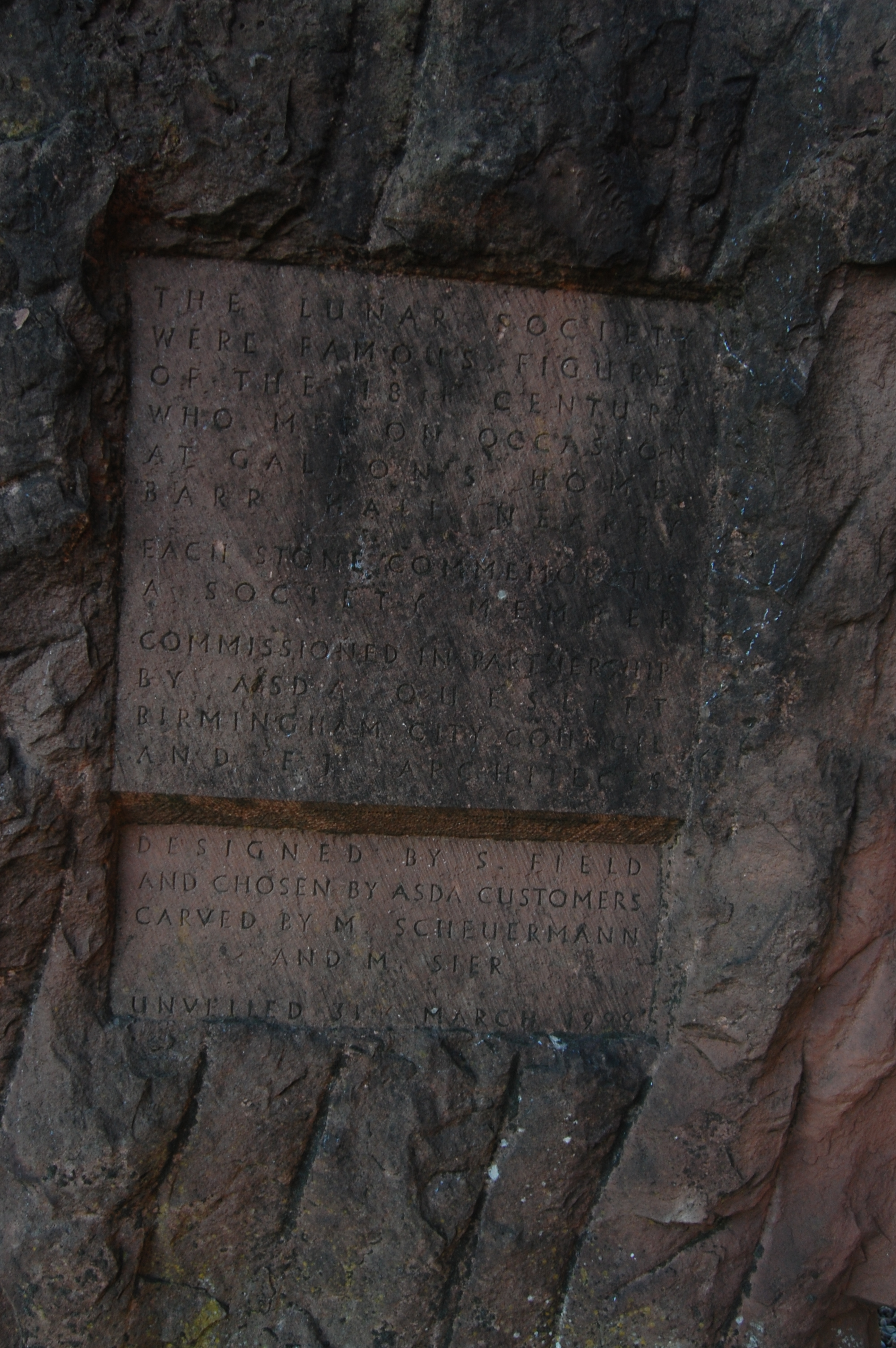
credits

== See also ==
- Science and invention in Birmingham
