= Samuel Galton Jr. =

English arms manufacturer (1753–1823

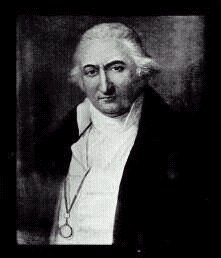
- Samuel Galton
- Born: 18 June 1753
- Died: 19 June 1822 (aged 69)

Samuel John Galton Jr. FRS (18 June 1753 – 19 June 1832) was an English arms manufacturer. He was born in Duddeston, Birmingham, England, into a Quaker family. He would go on to join his father's gun manufacturing company. With his father, he financed the slave-trading ship Africa.

He was a member of the Lunar Society in December of 1785 and lived at Great Barr Hall, one of the meeting places for the Lunar Society. He also built a house at Warley Woods, and commissioned Humphry Repton to lay out its grounds.

== Family life ==
Galton married Lucy Barclay (1757–1817), the daughter of Robert Barclay Allardice, MP, 5th of Ury. They would go on to have nine children together. His first born was Mary Anne Galton (1778–1856) who was a writer in the anti-slavery movement. She would marry Lambert Schimmelpenninck in 1806. Next, a daughter Priscilla Barclay Galton (1781–1784), died in early childhood. Galton's third child was Sophia Galton (1782–1863) who married Charles Brewin. The Galton's first son, Samuel Tertius Galton (1783–1844) would also become a member of the Lunar Society. He ended the family arms business in 1815. He married Violetta Darwin in 1807 and had a son named Francis Galton (1822–1911) who would go on to be a famous proponent of eugenics.

Galton had another son, Theodore Galton (1784–1810), although not much is known about him. His next child was Adele Galton (1784–1869) who married John Kaye Booth, MD, in 1827. Next would come Hubert John Barclay Galton (1789–1864), followed by Ewen Cameron Galton (1791–1800) who died at the age of 9. His last child was John Howard Galton (1794–1862) who married Isabelle Strutt. They had a son named Douglas Galton (1822–1899) who served in the royal engineers.

Galton was a lover of animals and even owned many bloodhounds. He loved birds as well, publishing three book volumes about them.

Galton owned 300 acres (120 ha) of land at Westhay Moor, Somerset, which he had drained, by constructing Galton's Canal.

== The Lunar Society ==
Samuel Galton joined the Lunar Society in December of 1785. Galton would join the Lunar Society as an in-person replacement for Erasmus Darwin, who remarried and moved away. He would be one of the fourteen members to be active during the height of the society. One reason for his inclusion into the Society was his love for statistics and data and his tendency to compare datasets.

Galton also had a great love for natural history, one of the subjects taught in Quaker schools. This, compounded with his love for animals, lead him to write many natural history books on them. His first set was The Natural History of Birds: containing a variety of facts ... for the amusement and instruction of children. This was a three-volume set of books intended for the education of children, specifically at first for his children. These were also the first natural history books written with the intent for children to be the primary readers.

Galton would have one more book project intended for younger audiences, and in 1801, The Natural History of Quadrupeds; including all the Linnaean class of mammalia...For the instruction of young persons was published. However, only one complete copy of this work exists in world libraries, specifically the Baldwin Library in the University of Florida.

During his time with the Lunar Society, Galton was known as a careful experimenter and a very original man. Some his notable experiments were that of color mixing, which he would publish on August 1, 1799 in Monthly Magazine. Galton also showed interest in canals, publishing a paper on them called On Canal Levels in 1817. This was for commercial reasons though, as Galton put those before scientific ones more times than not, leading to not many of his contributions being well known or published.

His family, many of which were members of the society, are remembered by the Moonstones in Birmingham and a tower block in the center of that city.

== Galton's gun manufacturing ==
Galton was condemned by the Quakers for manufacturing guns, as they believed it was against their pacifist values. His defense stated that since Britain was in a constant state of war, it was his duty as a citizen of his country to contribute through its massive industrial complex.
