= Boulton, Watt and Murdoch =

Gilded statue in Birmingham, England

Coordinates: 52.4786°N 1.9084°W

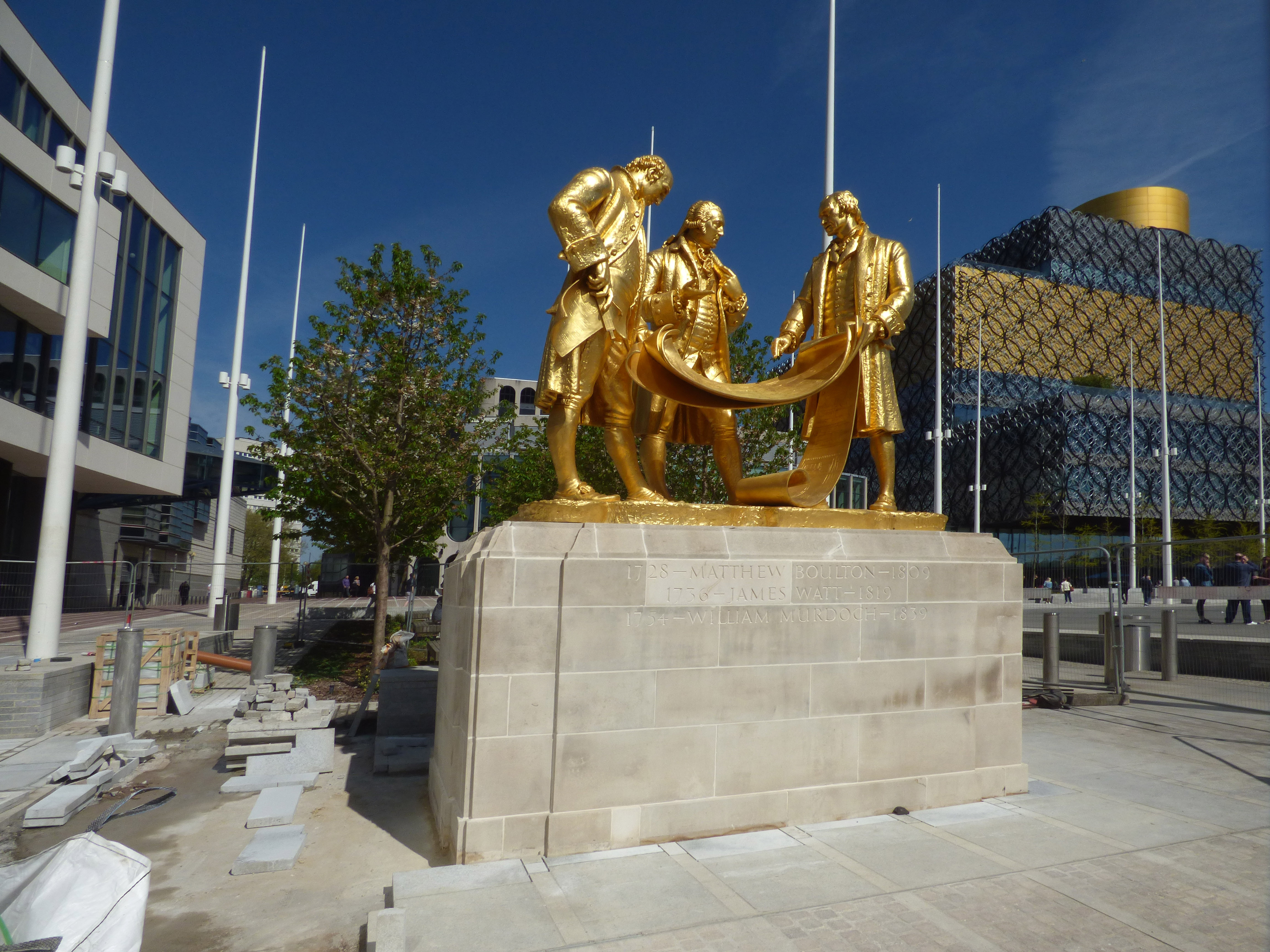
Boulton, Watt and Murdoch in Centenary Square since April 2022

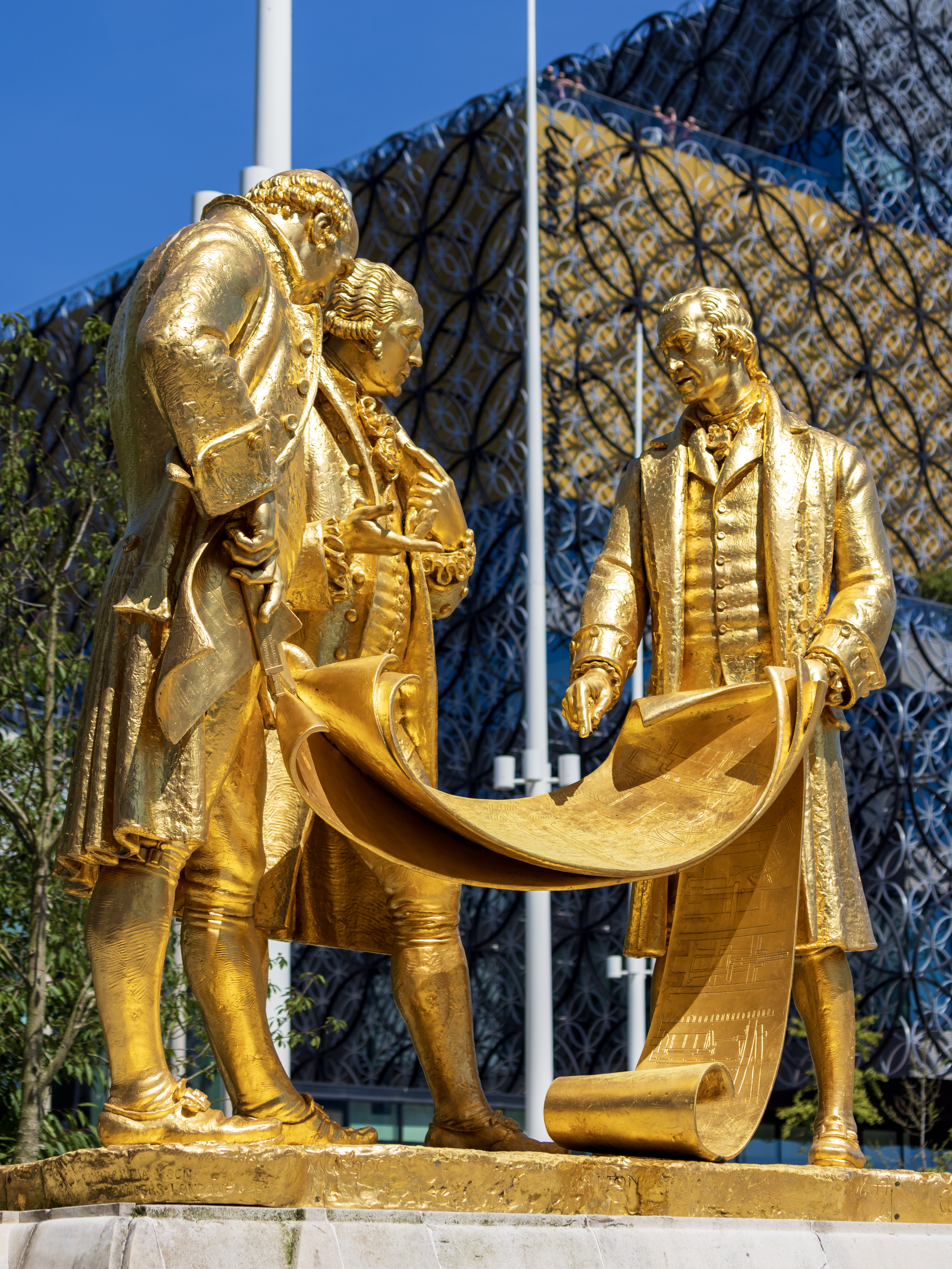
Boulton, Watt and Murdoch

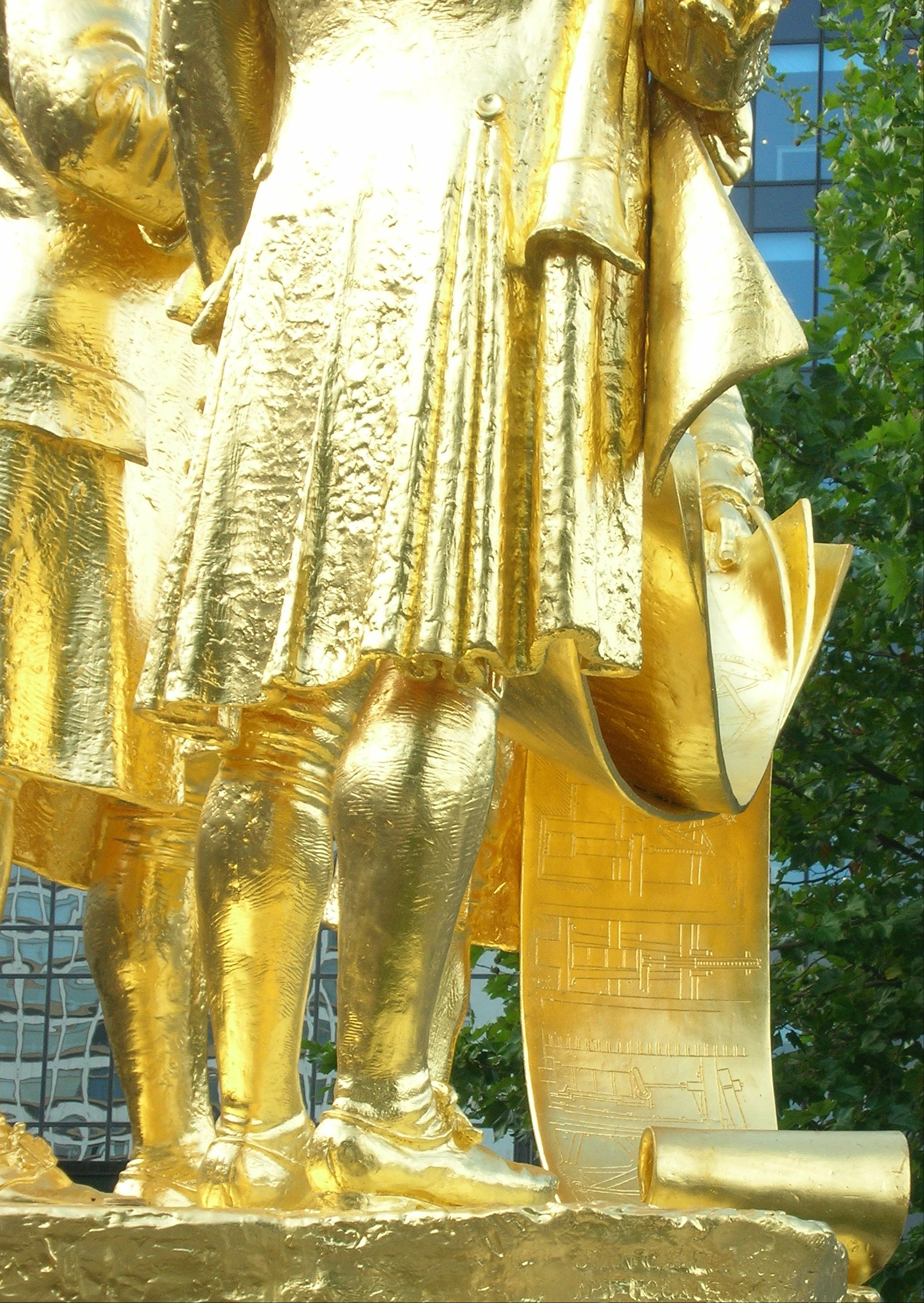
Detail of engine plans

Boulton, Watt and Murdoch is a gilded bronze statue depicting Matthew Boulton, James Watt, and William Murdoch by William Bloye, assisted by Raymond Forbes Kings. It stands on a plinth of Portland stone in Centenary Square, Birmingham and marks the contribution these individuals made to the development of the steam engine and hence the start of the Industrial Revolution of the 18th century.

It is also known as The Golden Boys after its colour, or The Carpet Salesmen after the partially rolled-up plan of a steam engine which they are examining (and an oblique nod to the often-aggressive marketing that emerged with the rise of industrialisation).

== History ==
In 1939 an £8,000 bequest from Richard Wheatley, and £7,500 from the City Council, enabled the work to be created and it was unveiled in 1956, from preliminary designs drawn up in 1938. In 1956 the statue was erected "temporarily" outside the Birmingham Register Office, with the intention of placing it at a future date in front of a planetarium to be built as part of the Civic Centre, but this never materialised. It therefore remained on the same site for over 60 years. It was restored and re-gilded in September 2006.

In 2017 it was temporarily put into storage to allow construction of the West Midlands Metro. It was reinstalled on the plinth in Centenary Square outside Symphony Hall on 29 April 2022.

== See also ==
- St Mary's Church, Handsworth (memorials to Boulton, Watt and Murdoch inside the church)
- Soho Manufactory
- Soho Foundry
- Soho Mint
- Boulton and Watt steam engine
