= James Keir =

Scottish inventor (1735–1820)

- Born: 20 September 1735; Stirlingshire, Scotland
- Died: 11 October 1820 (aged 85); West Bromwich
- Education: Royal High School, Edinburgh; University of Edinburgh
- Awards: Fellow of the Royal Society of London
- Scientific career
- Fields: chemist geologist industrialist inventor

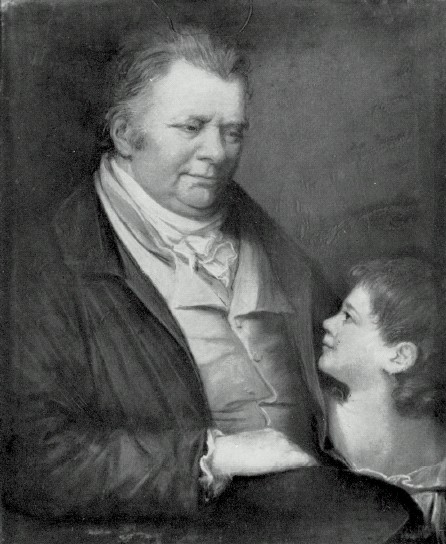

James Keir FRS (20 September 1735 – 11 October 1820) was a Scottish chemist, geologist, industrialist, and inventor, and an important member of the Lunar Society of Birmingham.

== Life and work ==
Keir was born in Stirlingshire, Scotland, in 1735 as the 18th child of Magdaline Lind (aunt of James Lind) and John Keir. He attended the Royal High School, Edinburgh, and studied medicine at the University of Edinburgh where he met and formed a lasting friendship with Erasmus Darwin.

At the age of 22, Keir joined the army and was commissioned into the 61st Regiment (now the Gloucestershire Regiment). During the seven years' war he was stationed with his regiment in the West Indies. He became lieutenant on, 31 March 1759, captain-lieutenant on 16 May 1766, and captain on 23 June of the same year.

In the spring of 1768 he resigned his commission, being disappointed at not meeting with more sympathy in his studies from his brother-officers. He found, however, one congenial friend in Alexander Blair, afterwards a captain in the 69th regiment of foot. While in the army Keir wrote a treatise on the art of war, which was accidentally burnt at his publishers, and a pamphlet addressed to the Marquis of Granby in favour of the sale of commissions. At this same period he used to rise at four o'clock in the morning to read the classics and military writers, and he translated many chapters of Polybius.

Keir ultimately settled at Hill Top, West Bromwich, Staffordshire, and devoted himself to chemistry and geology. In 1772, with others, Keir leased a long-established glassworks at Amblecote near Stourbridge, which he managed. Partners included Samuel Skey (who manufactured vitriol near Bewdley) and John Taylor (a leading Birmingham manufacturer). While there, Keir continued his chemical experiments, particularly into the properties of alkalis. A paper by him "On the Crystallisations observed on Glass" was communicated to the Royal Society by his friend George Fordyce and printed in the Society's Philosophical Transactions in 1776.

Early in the same year Keir completed his translation of Macquer's Dictionnaire de Chymie, with additions and notes, published at London in two quarto volumes. In 1777 he issued a Treatise on the Different kinds of Elastic Fluids or Gases (new edition, 1779). Keir had become friends with Matthew Boulton, and in the autumn of 1768 he first met James Watt at Boulton's house.

In 1778 Keir gave up his glass business to undertake, in the absence of Boulton and Watt, the sole charge of their engineering works at Soho, Birmingham near Handsworth. He declined, however, the offer of a partnership on account of the financial risk, and limited his connection with the firm to the letter-copying machine department.

In 1779 Keir invented and took out a patent for an alloy of copper, zinc, and iron, which could be forged hot or cold. The alloy, which Keir called "Eldorado metal," originally intended for sheathing ship bottoms, but later adopted for architectural fixtures. It has been said to be almost identical with what later became known as Muntz metal.

In 1780 Keir, in conjunction with Alexander Blair (then retired from the army), established a chemical works at Tipton, near Dudley, for the manufacture of alkali from the sodium and potassium sulphates, to which he afterwards added a soap manufactory. The method of extraction proceeded on a discovery of Keir's. A nearby road was called Soap Factory Road, though it is now called Factory Road.

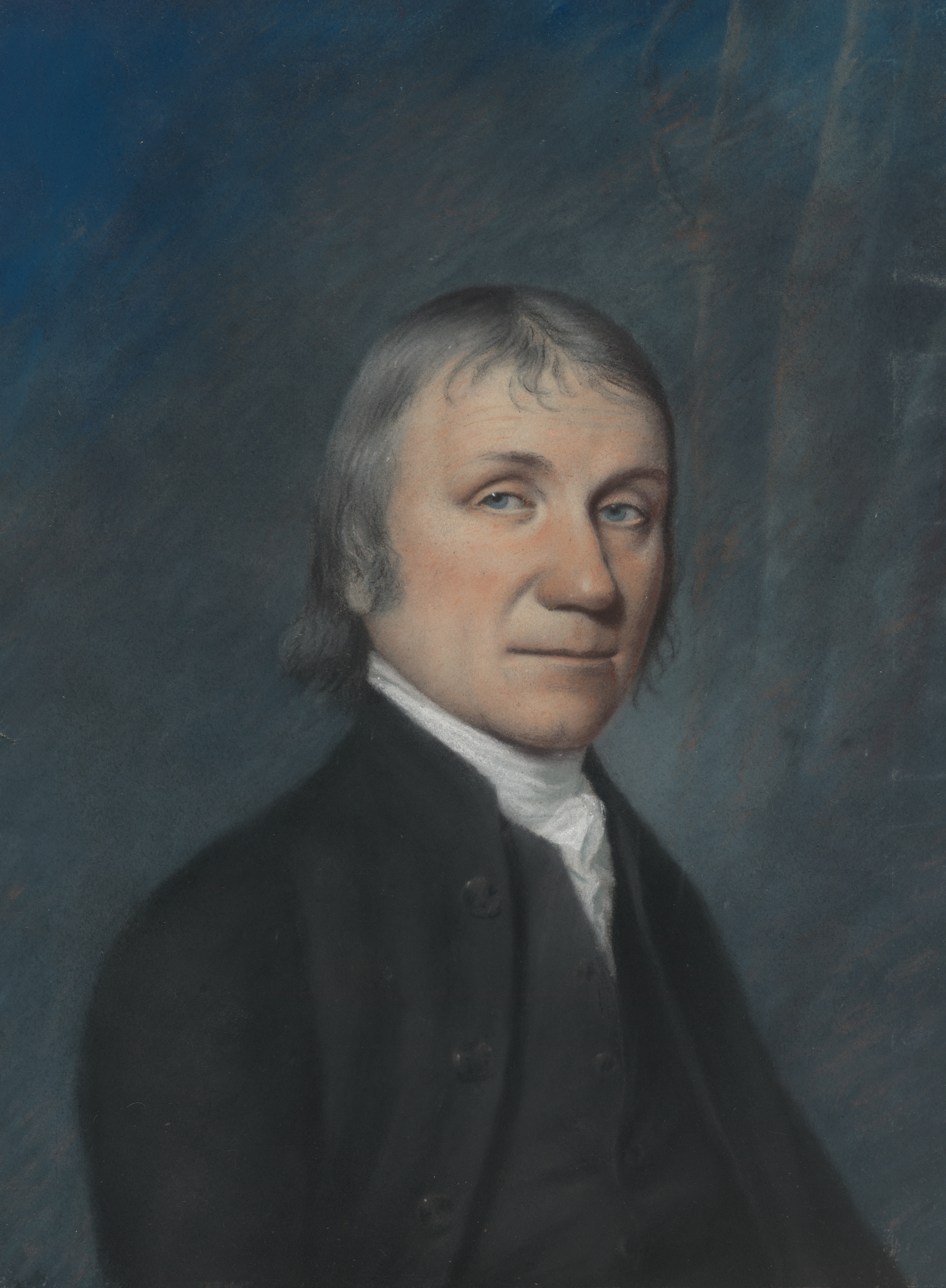
Joseph Priestley

When Joseph Priestley came to Birmingham in 1780, he found an able assistant in Keir, who had discovered the distinction between carbon dioxide gas and atmospheric air. Keir worked closely with Priestley to investigate the properties of gases. On 3 May 1787 Keir communicated to the Royal Society some "Experiments on the Congelation of the Vitriolic Acid", and on 1 May 1788 "Remarks on the Principle of Acidity, Decomposition of Water, and Phlogiston". Another paper, on "Fossil Alkali", appeared in 1788 in the "Transactions of the Society of Arts". Keir published the first part of his "Dictionary of Chemistry" in 1789. He discontinued it upon becoming convinced of the weakness of his theory of phlogiston.

On 20 May 1790, Keir communicated to the Royal Society "Experiments and Observations on the Dissolution of Metals in Acids, and their Precipitations, with an Account of a new compound Acid Menstruum, useful in some technical operations of parting metals". This paper contains suggestions which may have contributed to the discovery of the electro-plate process. It was translated into German later the same year by Augustin Gottfried Ludwig Lentin as Versuche und Beobachtungen über die Auflösung der Metalle in Säuren ...

About 1794, Keir and Blair purchased land in the Tividale area, on the borders of Dudley and Tipton, on which they established the Tividale colliery. Keir studied the mineralogy of Staffordshire, and in 1798 wrote an article on it for Stebbing Shaw's History of Staffordshire. He also gave Shaw information on Staffordshire manufacturing.

Sir Humphry Davy, while visiting Gregory Watt at Birmingham in 1800, was introduced to Keir. In February 1811 Keir forwarded to the Geological Society "An Account of the Strata in sinking a Pit in Tividale Colliery", accompanied by a number of specimens.

On 19 December 1807, while Keir was staying with Blair at Hilton Park, his house at West Bromwich was burnt, though most of his books and papers were saved. For a time he lived at a small farmhouse in the neighbourhood.

Keir died at West Bromwich on 11 October 1820, and was buried at All Saints Church, Charlemont. By his marriage in 1770 to Susanna Harvey (1747–1802) he had an only child, Amelia (1780–1857), who in 1801 married John Lewis Moilliet of Geneva and later Abberley, afterwards merchant and banker of Birmingham.

== Selected non-scientific writings ==
In 1791 Keir wrote, at the special desire of the widow, a memoir of his friend Thomas Day, author of "Sandford and Merton". During the same year Keir's avowal of sympathy with the French revolution at a public dinner on 14 July exposed him to much virulent abuse. He defended himself and Priestley in various pamphlets, such as the "Extinguisher Maker", "T. Sobersides", and "High Church Politics". In 1793 Keir published a pamphlet entitled 'The Martial Character of Nations,' arguing that the French were not likely to become so pacific as to make national defence less necessary. Ten years later he wrote Reflections on the Invasion of Great Britain by the French Armies; on the Mode of Defence; and on the useful application of the National Levies (1803).

Keir, who frequently amused himself by writing poetry, suggested to Darwin many improvements (afterwards adopted) for the second part of the Botanic Garden. The most valuable portion of his correspondence was destroyed by the fire at his daughter's residence, Abberley Hall, Worcestershire, on 25 December 1845. A selection from what was saved, with a sketch of his life, was printed for private circulation in 1859.

== Honours and memorials ==
- Keir was elected a Fellow of the Royal Society of London on 8 December 1785.
- Keir is remembered by the Lunar Society Moonstones in Birmingham.
