= North Drain =

River in Somerset, England

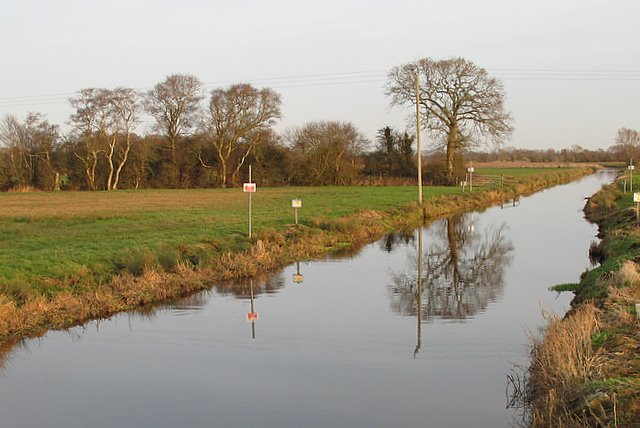

Location
- Country: England
- County: Somerset
- District: Somerset Levels

Physical characteristics
- Source: River Sheppey
- Mouth: River Brue
  - coordinates: 51°11′58″N 2°51′44″W
- Length: 10 km (6.2 mi)

Basin features
- Tributaries
  - left: Galton's Canal

The North Drain flows westerly from Hurn Sluice on the River Sheppey to the North Drain Pumping Station at the River Brue, in Somerset, England.
