= Sweet Track =

Ancient causeway in the Somerset Levels, England

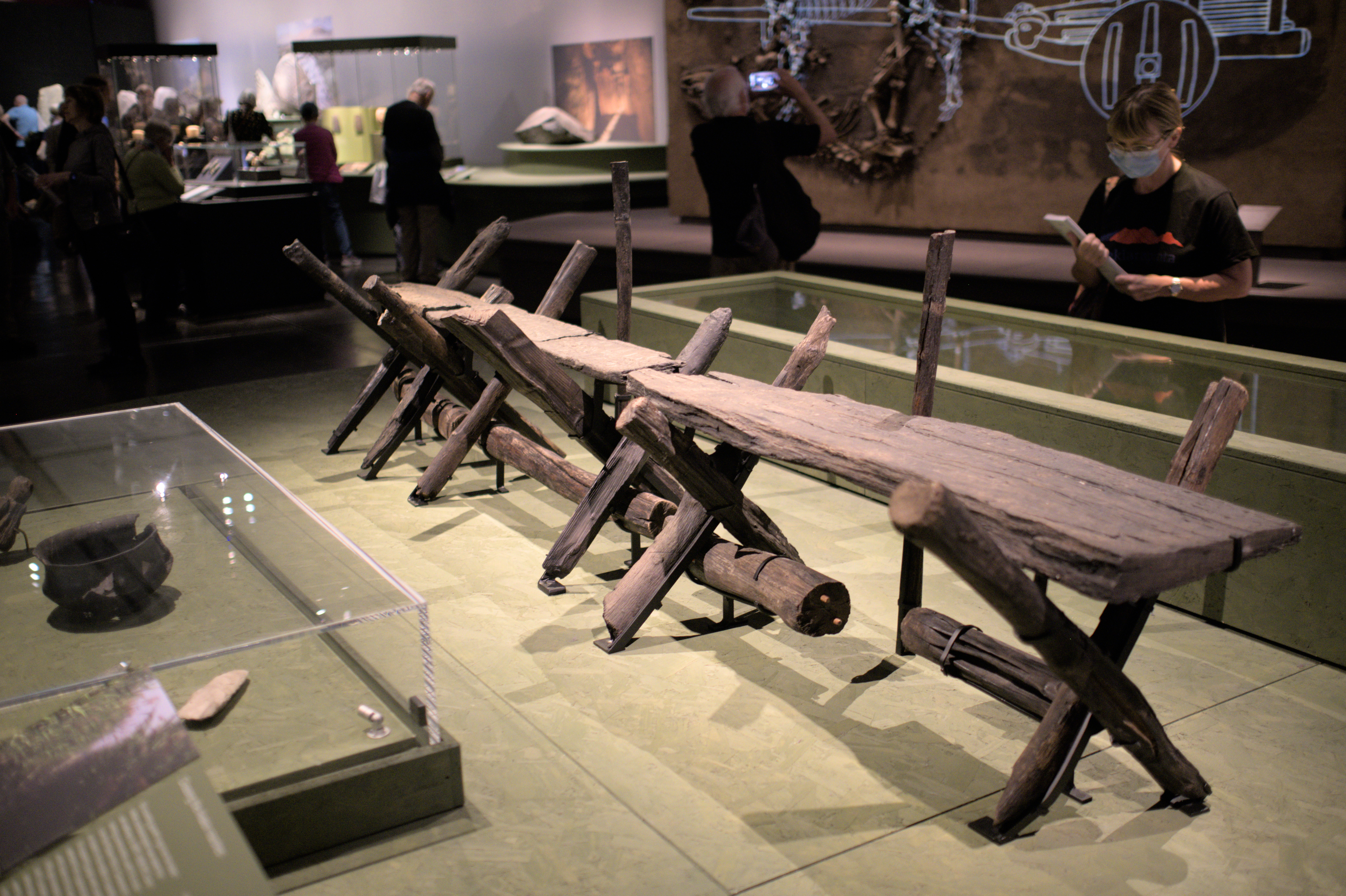
- Part of the Sweet Track oak causeway, British Museum

- Location within Somerset
- 51°09′51″N 2°49′35″W
- Location: Shapwick Heath, Somerset Levels, England

History
- Built: 3807 or 3806 BC

Scheduled monument
- Official name: Sections of the Sweet Track, the Post Track and associated remains 500m north east of Moorgate Farm
- Designated: 14 January 1976
- Reference no.: 1014438

Scheduled monument
- Official name: Sections of the Sweet Track and Post Track, 650m east of Canada Farm
- Designated: 14 January 1976
- Reference no.: 1014439

Scheduled monument
- Official name: Sections of the Sweet Track and Post Track, 240m south west of Sunnyside Farm
- Designated: 19 October 1983
- Reference no.: 1014440

Scheduled monument
- Official name: Sections of the Sweet Track and Post Track, 250m ESE of Station House
- Designated: 2 January 1976
- Reference no.: 1014831

The Sweet Track is an ancient trackway, or causeway, in the Somerset Levels, England, named after its finder, Ray Sweet. It was built in 3807 BC (determined using dendrochronology – tree-ring dating) and is the second-oldest timber trackway discovered in the British Isles, dating to the Neolithic. The Sweet Track was predominantly built along the course of an earlier structure, the Post Track.

The track extended across the now largely drained marsh between what was then an island at Westhay and a ridge of high ground at Shapwick, a distance close to 1,800 metres (5,900 ft) or around 1.1 mi. The track is one of a network that once crossed the Somerset Levels. Various artifacts and prehistoric finds, including a jadeitite ceremonial axe head, have been found in the peat bogs along its length.

Construction was of crossed wooden poles, driven into the waterlogged soil to support a walkway that consisted mainly of planks of oak, laid end-to-end. The track was used for a period of only around ten years and was then abandoned, probably due to rising water levels. Following its discovery in 1970, most of the track has been left in its original location, with active conservation measures taken, including a water pumping and distribution system to maintain the wood in its damp condition. Some of the track is stored at the British Museum and at the Museum of Somerset in Taunton. A reconstruction has been made on which visitors can walk, on the same line as the original, in Shapwick Heath National Nature Reserve.

== Location ==
In the early fourth millennium BC, the track was built between an island at Westhay and a ridge of high ground at Shapwick close to the River Brue. A group of mounds at Westhay mark the site of prehistoric lake dwellings, which were likely to have been similar to those found in the Iron Age Glastonbury Lake Village near Godney, itself built on a morass on an artificial foundation of timber filled with brushwood, bracken, rubble, and clay.

The remains of similar tracks have been uncovered nearby, connecting settlements on the peat bog; they include the Honeygore, Abbotts Way, Bells, Bakers, Westhay, and Nidons trackways. Sites such as the nearby Meare Pool provide evidence that the purpose of these structures was to enable easier travel between the settlements. Investigation of the Meare Pool indicates that it was formed by the encroachment of raised peat bogs around it, particularly during the Subatlantic climatic period (1st millennium BC), and core sampling demonstrates that it is filled with at least 2 metres (6.6 ft) of detritus mud.

The two Meare Lake Villages within Meare Pool appear to originate from a collection of structures erected on the surface of the dried peat, such as tents, windbreaks and animal folds. Clay was later spread over the peat, providing raised stands for occupation, industry and movement, and in some areas thicker clay spreads accommodated hearths built of clay or stone.

== Discovery and study ==
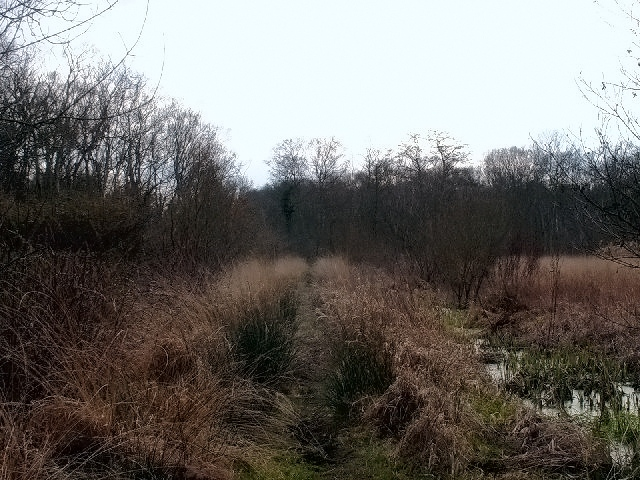
The Sweet Track was found in the Somerset Levels

The track was discovered in 1970 during peat excavations and is named after its finder, Ray Sweet. The company for which he worked, E. J. Godwin, sent part of a plank from the track to John Coles, an assistant lecturer in archaeology at Cambridge University, who had carried out some excavations on nearby trackways. Coles' interest in the trackways led to the Somerset Levels Project, which ran from 1973 to 1989, funded by various donors including English Heritage. The project undertook a range of local archaeological activities, and established the economic and geographic significance of various trackways from the third and first millennia BC. The work of John Coles, Bryony Coles, and the Somerset Levels Project was recognised in 1996 when they won the Imperial Chemical Industries (ICI) Award for the best archaeological project offering a major contribution to knowledge, and in 2006 with the European Archaeological Heritage Prize.

Dendrochronology (tree-ring dating) of the timbers has enabled precise dating of the track, showing it was built in 3807 BC. This dating led to claims that the Sweet Track was the oldest roadway in the world, until the discovery in 2009 of a 6,000-year-old trackway built in 4100 BC, in Plumstead, near Belmarsh prison. Analysis of the Sweet Track's timbers has aided research into Neolithic Era dendrochronology; comparisons with wood from the River Trent and a submerged forest at Stolford enabled a fuller mapping of the rings, and their relationship with the climate of the period.

The wood used to build the track is now classed as bog-wood, the name given to wood (of any source) that for long periods (sometimes hundreds of thousands of years) has been buried in peat bogs, and kept from decaying by the acidic and anaerobic bog conditions. Bog-wood usually is stained brown by tannins dissolved in the acidic water, and represents an early stage of fossilisation. The age of the track prompted large-scale excavations in 1973, funded by the Department of the Environment.

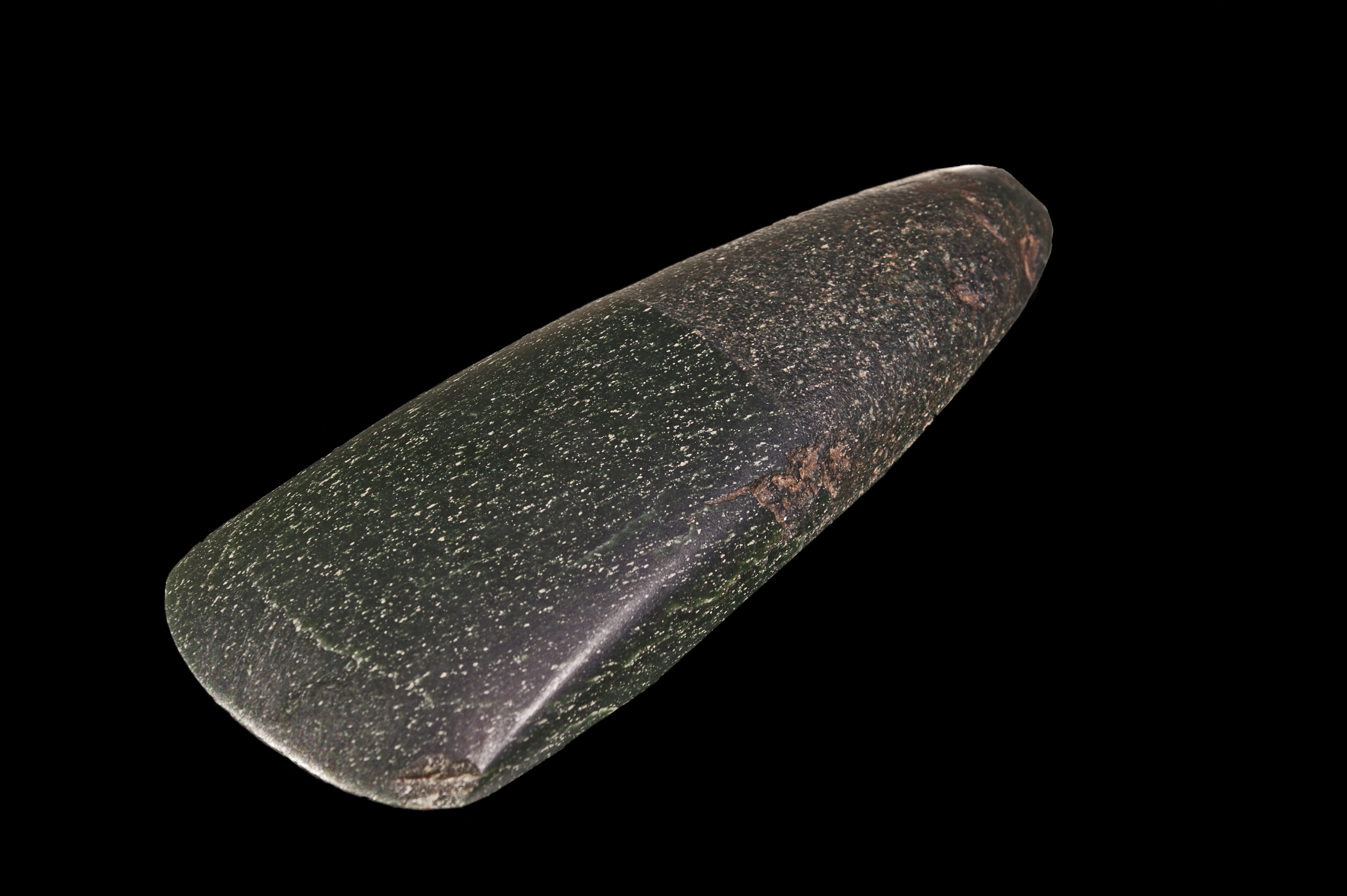
A polished jadeitite axe head from the Museum of Toulouse

In 1973, a jadeitite axehead was found alongside the track; it is thought to have been placed there as an offering. One of over 100 similar axe heads found in Britain and Ireland, its good condition and its precious material suggest that it was a symbolic axe, rather than one used to cut wood. Because of the difficulty of working this material, which was derived from the Alpine area of Europe, all the axe heads of this type found in Great Britain are thought to have been non-utilitarian and to have represented some form of currency or be the products of gift exchange. Radiocarbon dating of the peat in which the axe head was discovered suggests that it was deposited in about 3200 BC. Wooden artefacts found at the site include paddles, a dish, arrow shafts, parts of four hazel bows, a throwing axe, yew pins, digging sticks, a mattock, a comb, toggles, and a spoon fragment. Finds made from other materials, such as flint flakes, arrowheads, and a chipped flint axe (in mint condition) have also been made.

A geophysical survey of the area in 2008 showed unclear magnetometer data; the wood may be influencing the peat's hydrology, causing the loss or collection of minerals within the pore water and peat matrix.

== Builders ==
The community that constructed the trackway were Neolithic farmers who had colonised the area around 3900 BC, and the evidence suggests that they were, by the time of construction, well organised and settled. Before this human incursion, the uplands surrounding the levels were heavily wooded, but local inhabitants began to clear these forests about this time to make way for an economy that was predominately pastoral with small amounts of cultivation. During the winter, the flooded areas of the levels would have provided this fishing, hunting, foraging and farming community with abundant fish and wildfowl; in the summer, the drier areas provided rich, open grassland for grazing cattle and sheep, reeds, wood, and timber for construction, and abundant wild animals, birds, fruit, and seeds. The need to reach the islands in the bog was sufficiently pressing for them to mount the enormous communal activity required for the task of stockpiling the timber and building the trackway, presumably when the waters were at their lowest after a dry period. The work required for the construction of the track demonstrates that they had advanced woodworking skills and suggests some differentiation of occupation among the workers. They also appear to have been managing the surrounding woodland for at least 120 years.

== Construction ==
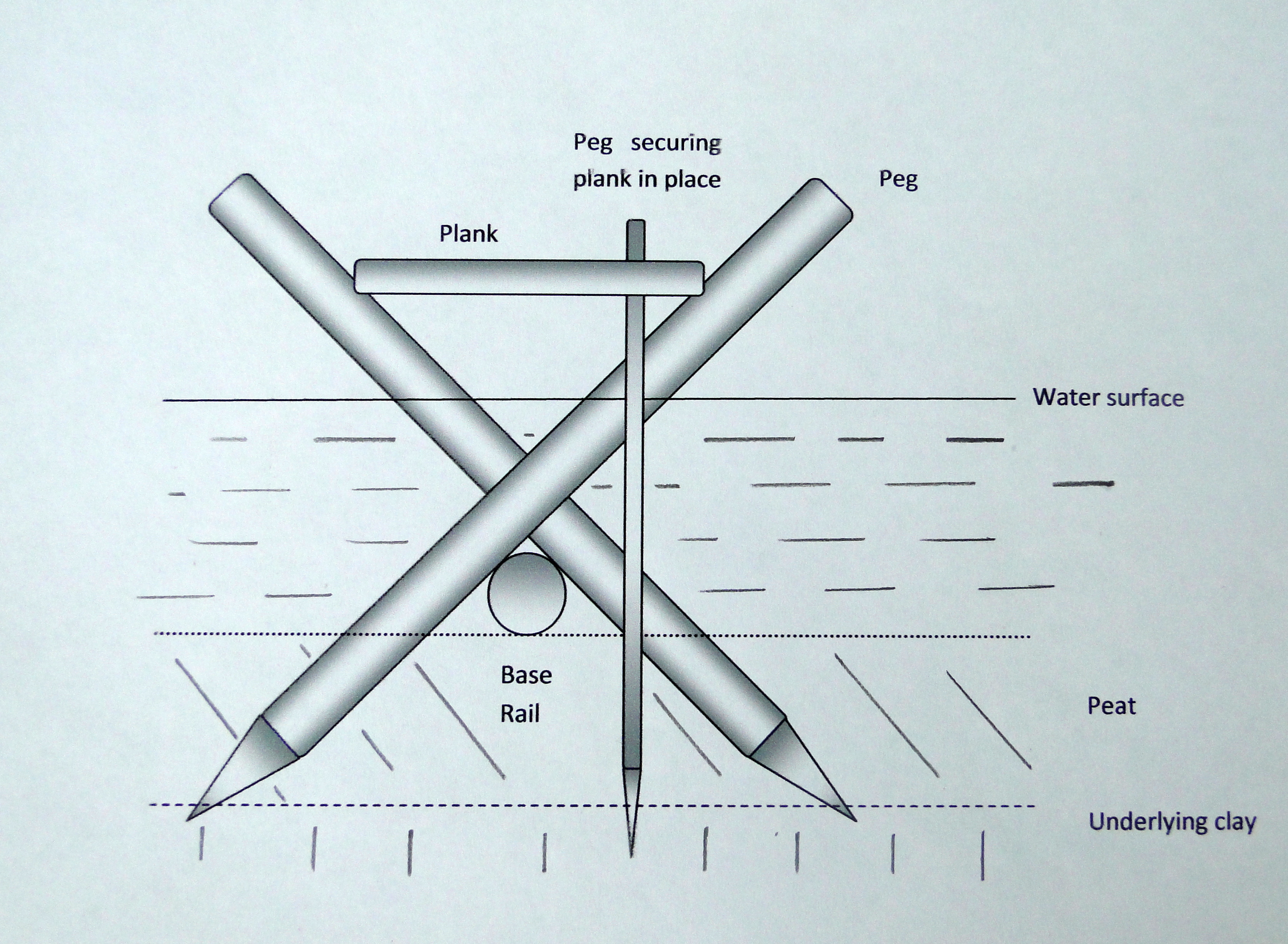
Diagram showing a cross section of the Sweet Track

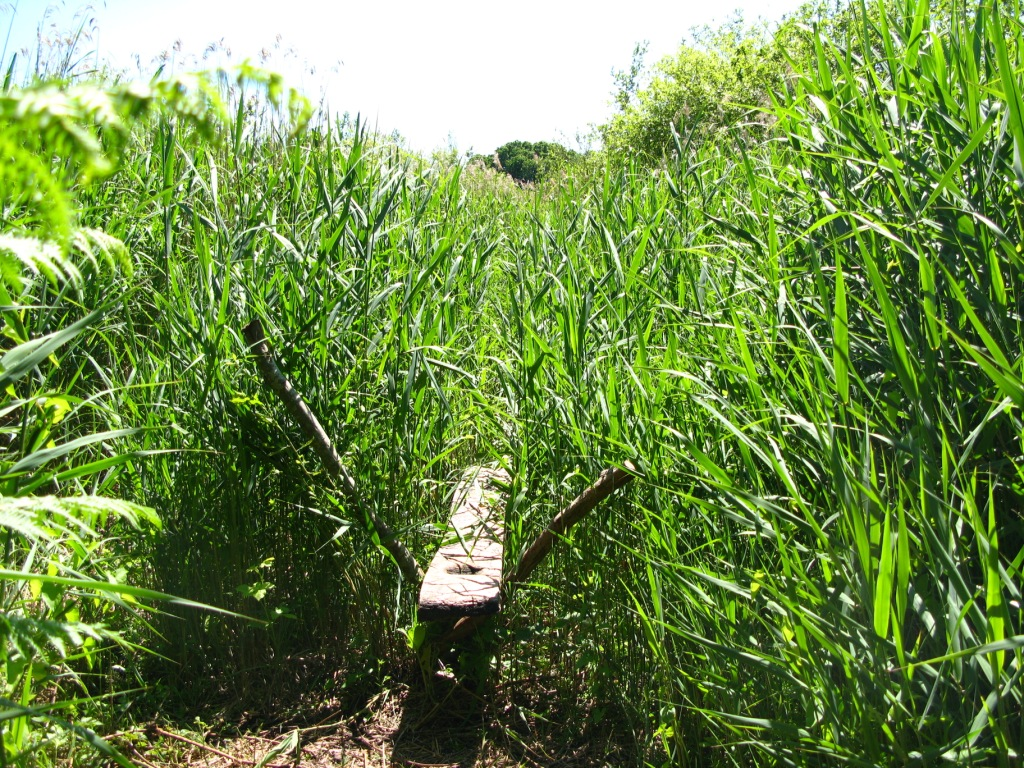
A replica of the Sweet Track

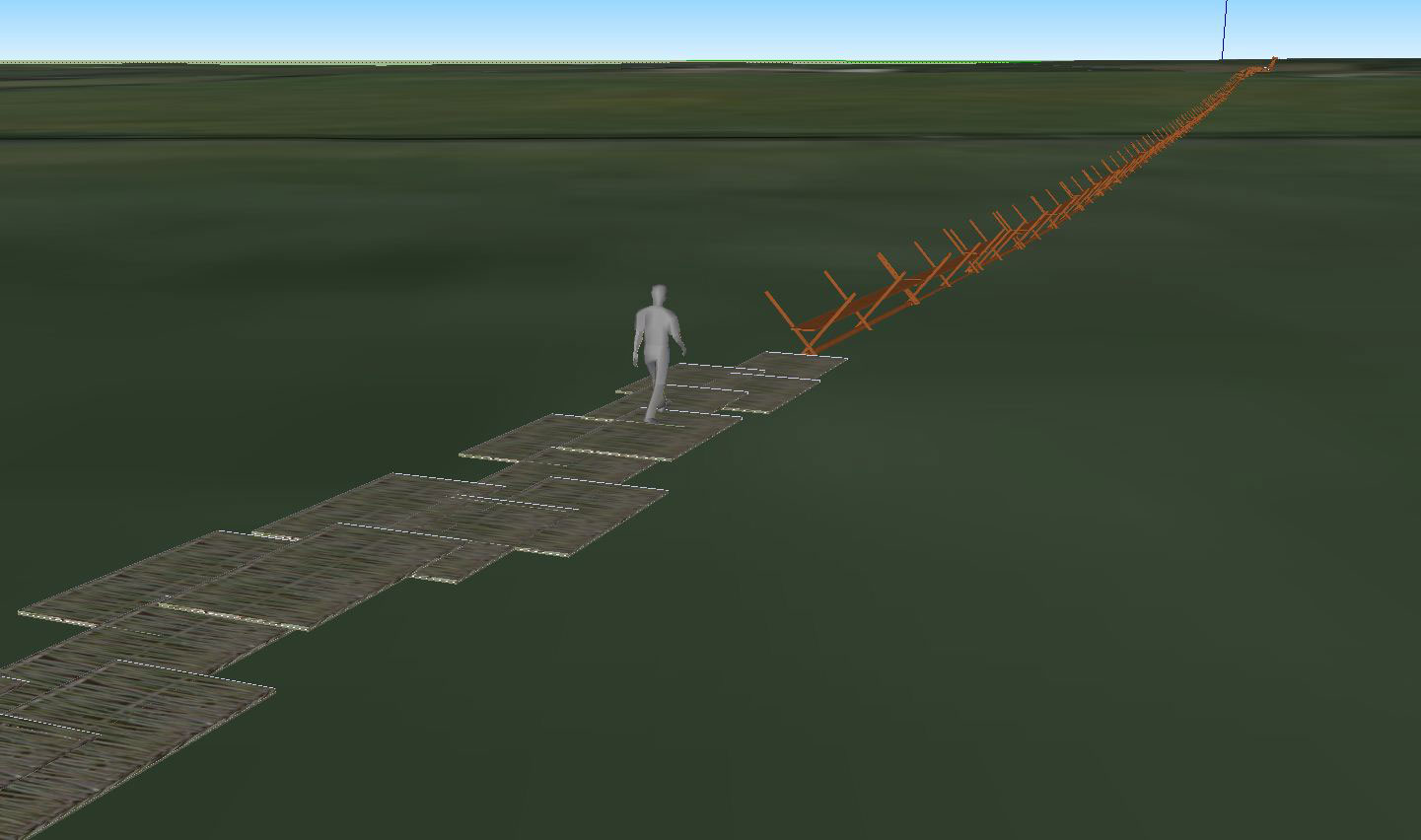
Digital reconstruction of the Sweet Track, southern end

Built in 3807 or 3806 BC, the track was a walkway consisting mainly of planks of oak laid end-to-end, supported by crossed pegs of ash, oak, and lime, driven into the underlying peat. The planks, which were up to 40 centimetres (16 in) wide, 3 metres (120 in) long and less than 5 centimetres (2.0 in) thick, were cut from trees up to 400 years old and 1 metre (39 in) in diameter, felled and split using only stone axes, wooden wedges, and mallets. The length, straightness, and lack of forks or branches in the pegs suggest that they were taken from coppiced woodland. Longitudinal log rails up to 6.1 metres (20 ft) long and 7.6 centimetres (3.0 in) in diameter, made of mostly hazel and alder, were laid down and held in place with the pegs, which were driven at an angle across the rails and into the peat base of the bog. Notches were then cut into the planks to fit the pegs, and the planks were laid along the X shapes to form the walkway. In some places a second rail was placed on top of the first one to bring the plank above it level with the rest of the walkway. Some of the planks were then stabilised with slender, vertical wooden pegs driven through holes cut near the end of the planks and into the peat, and sometimes the clay, beneath. At the southern end of the construction smaller trees were used, and the planks split across the grain to utilise the full diameter of the trunk. Fragments of other tree species including holly, willow, poplar, dogwood, ivy, birch, and apple have also been found.

The wetland setting indicates that the track components must have arrived prefabricated, before being assembled on site, although the presence of wood chips and chopped branches indicates that some trimming was performed locally. The track was constructed from about 200,000 kilograms (440,000 lb) of timber, but Coles estimates that once the materials were transported to the site, ten men could have assembled it in one day.

The Sweet Track was used only for about ten years; rising water levels may have engulfed it, and therefore curtailed its use. The variety of objects found alongside the track suggest that it was in daily use as part of the farming life of the community. Since its discovery, it has been determined that parts of the Sweet Track were built along the route of an even earlier track, the Post Track, which was constructed thirty years earlier in 3838 BC.

== Conservation ==
Most of the track remains in its original location, which is now within the Shapwick Heath biological Site of Special Scientific Interest and National Nature Reserve. Following purchase of land by the National Heritage Memorial Fund, and installation of a water pumping and distribution system along a 500-metre (1,600 ft) section, several hundred metres of the track's length are now being actively conserved. This method of preserving wetland archaeological remains (maintaining a high water table and saturating the site) is rare. A 500-metre (1,600 ft) section, which lies within the land owned by Natural England, has been surrounded by a clay bank to prevent drainage into surrounding lower peat fields, and water levels are regularly monitored. The viability of this method is demonstrated by comparing it with the nearby Abbot's Way, which has not had similar treatment, and which in 1996 was found to have become dewatered and desiccated. Evaluation and maintenance of water levels in the Shapwick Heath Nature Reserve involves Natural England, the Department for Environment, Food and Rural Affairs, and the Somerset Levels Project.

Although the wood recovered from the Levels was visually intact, it was extremely degraded and very soft. Where possible, pieces of wood in good condition, or the worked ends of pegs, were taken away and conserved for later analysis. The conservation process involved keeping the wood in heated tanks in a solution of polyethylene glycol and, by a process of evaporation, gradually replacing the water in the wood with the wax over a period of about nine months. After this treatment the wood was removed from the tank and wiped clean. As the wax cooled and hardened, the artefact became firm and could be handled freely.

A section of the track on land owned by Fisons (who extracted peat from the area) was donated to the British Museum in London. Although this short section can be assembled for display purposes, it is currently kept in store, off site, and under controlled conditions. A reconstructed section was displayed at the Peat Moors Centre near Glastonbury. The centre was run by the Somerset Historic Environment Service, but was closed in October 2009 as a result of budget cuts imposed by Somerset County Council. The main exhibits are extant, but future public access is uncertain. Other samples of the track are held in the Museum of Somerset.

Four sections of the track, two in Shapwick and two in Meare, have been designated as a scheduled monument, meaning that it is a "nationally important" historic structure and archaeological site protected against unauthorised change. The sections in Meare are also included in Historic England's Heritage at Risk Register.

== Bibliography ==
- Coles, John; Coles, Bryony (1986). Sweet Track to Glastonbury: The Somerset Levels in Prehistory. London: Thames and Hudson. ISBN 978-0-500-39022-1.
- Coles, Bryony; Coles, John (1980). Prehistory of the Somerset Levels. Cambridge: Somerset Levels Project. ISBN 978-0-9507122-0-8.
- Coles, John (November 1989). "The Worlds's Oldest Road". Scientific American. 261 (5): 100–106. Bibcode:1989SciAm.261e.100C. doi:10.1038/scientificamerican1189-100. Archived from the original on 8 March 2023.
