= Arthur Bulleid =

British antiquarian

Arthur Bullied
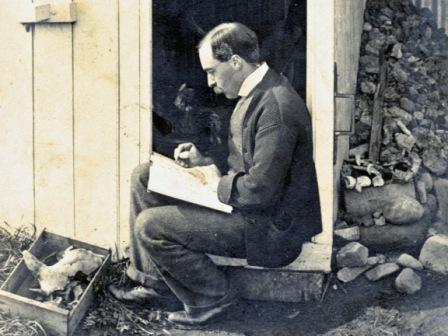
- Born: 24 June 1862; Glastonbury
- Died: 27 December 1951 (aged 89)
- Known for: Excavation of Glastonbury Lake Village and Meare Lake Village
- Scientific career
- Fields: Archaeology

Arthur Bulleid (1862–1951) was a British antiquarian, known for the excavation of Glastonbury Lake Village and Meare Lake Village.

He was born in Glastonbury, the sixth son of John Bulleid, the mayor and founder of the Glastonbury Antiquarian Society, and his wife Christina. He became a medical student but was interested in local history and archaeology. In 1900 he was married to Anna Elanor Austin. They lived at Dymboro, a house in Midsomer Norton built for them as a wedding present from Anna's father, and had six children.

In his twenties he heard about the discovery of lake villages in Switzerland and suspected that similar Iron or Bronze Age settlements may exist on the Somerset Levels. He spent his summers searching for them and in 1892 identified a promising field at Godney and began to excavate it. He gave up his medical studies to concentrate on the site which became known as Glastonbury Lake Village, digging during the summer and describing and cataloging his finds during the winter. In 1898 he stopped the excavation and completed his medical studies before restarting the dig in 1904 with Harold St George Gray.

He later went on to excavate, with Gray, another similar site the Meare Lake Village. His work is commemorated in the Glastonbury Lake Village Museum at The Tribunal, Glastonbury.

Bulleid died in 1951 and is buried in the cemetery, Wells Road, Glastonbury.
