= The Tribunal, Glastonbury =

Grade I listed building in Glastonbury

The Tribunal
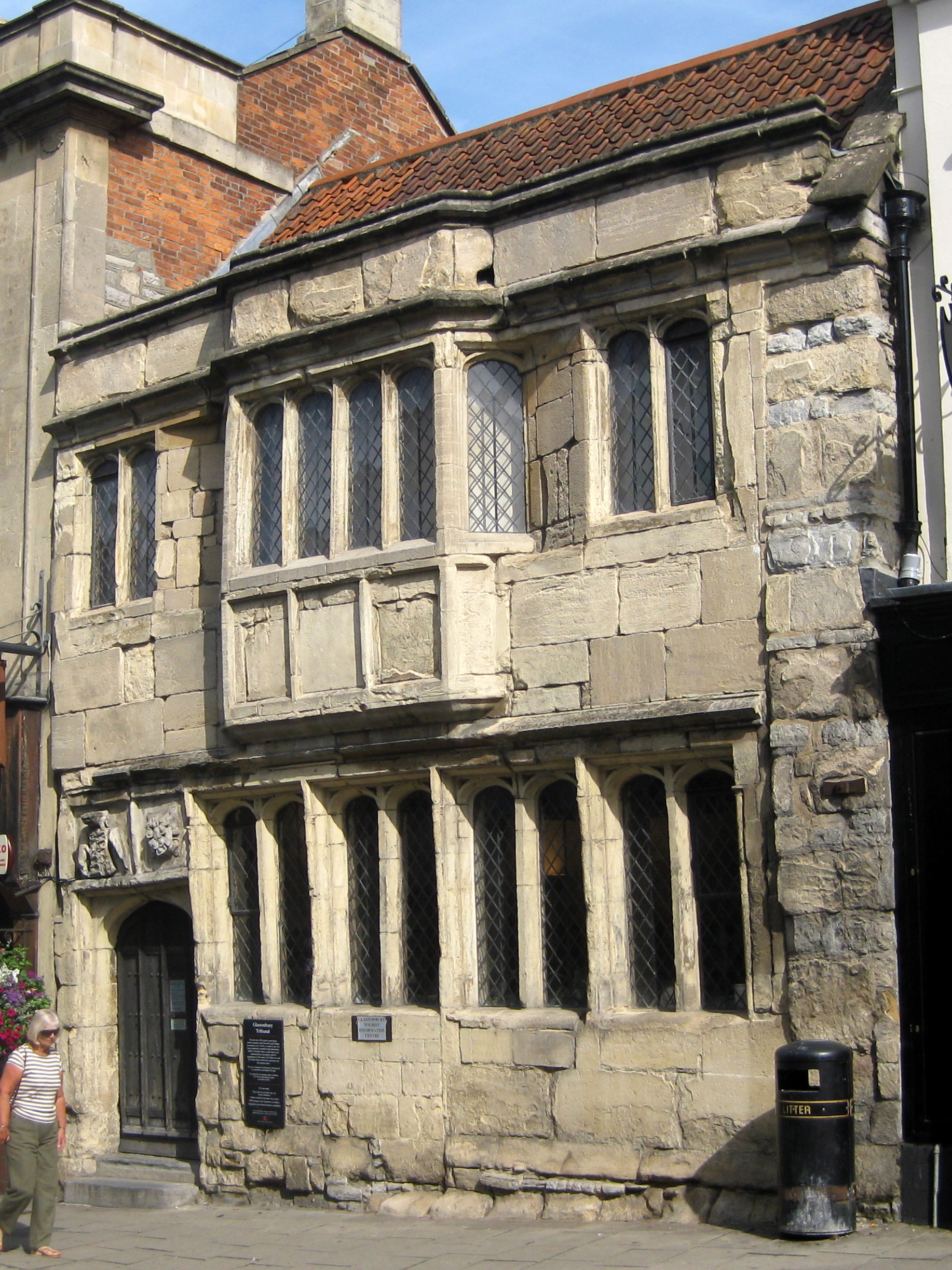

- Location within Somerset

General information
- Location: Glastonbury, England
- Coordinates: 51°8′51.58″N 2°43′1.68″W
- Construction started: 15th century
- Completed: 16th century

The Tribunal in Glastonbury, Somerset, England, was built in the 15th century as a merchant's house. It has been designated as a Grade I listed building.

The history of the building is not well documented, although the majority of the present stone house was constructed in the 15th century on the site of a 12th-century wooden building. The current front wall, made of medieval stonework, was added at a later date. It has been used as a merchant's house, a shop, school and a convent. It was thought that it was the venue for court proceedings, hence the title Tribunal, however there is no evidence this ever occurred. One of the ground floor rooms still has the window and ceiling panels from the Elizabethan era. The front room upstairs has an arched braced, wooden, truss roof.

The building is currently in the guardianship of English Heritage. It contains the museum of the Glastonbury Antiquarian Society which houses artefacts from both the town and the Glastonbury Lake Village including the "Glastonbury Bowl". The museum is run by Glastonbury Town Council with all proceeds reinvested into the town.

== History ==
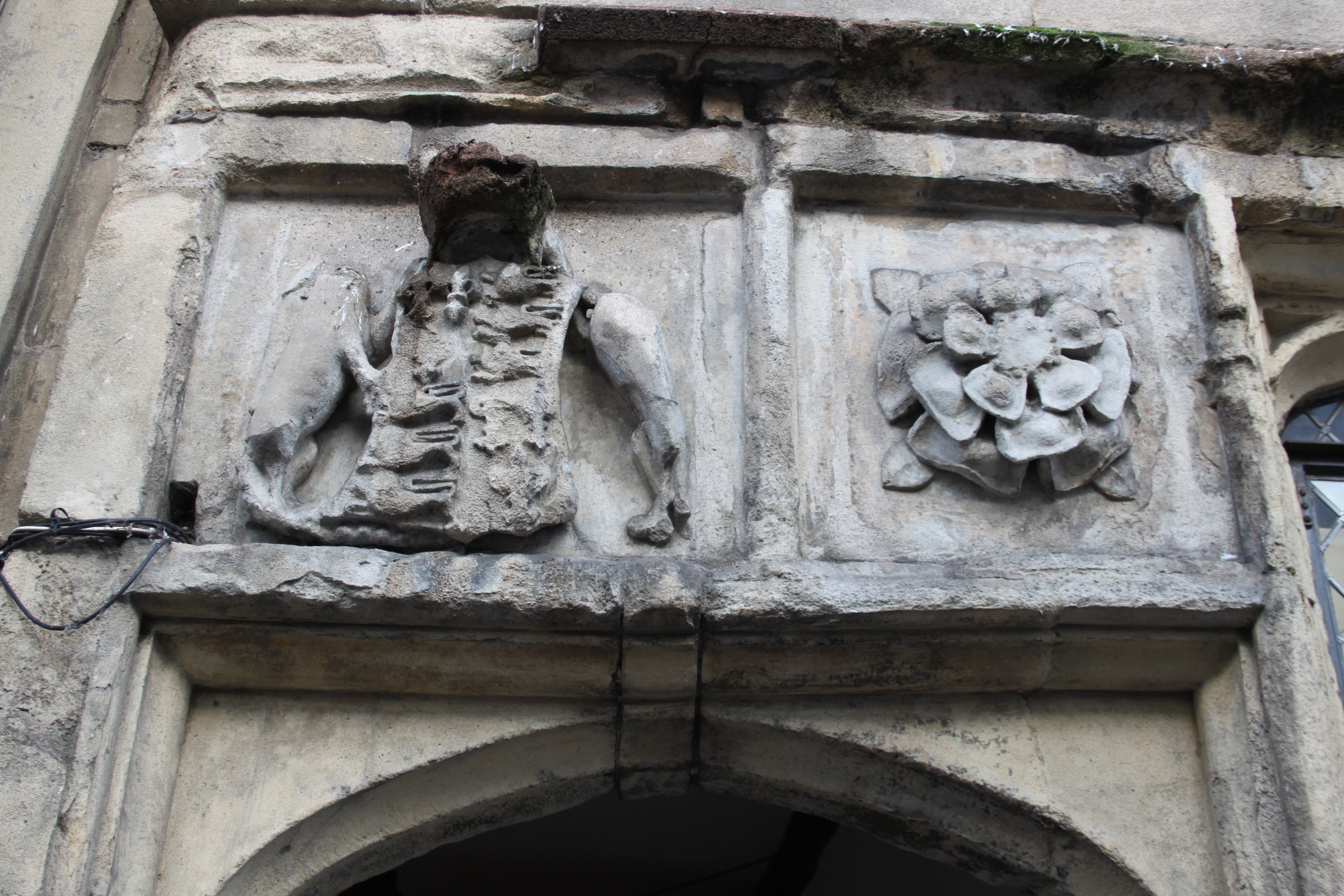
The royal arms and Tudor rose above the entrance

Glastonbury Tribunal owes its name to the fact that it was formerly mistakenly identified with the Abbey's tribunals, where secular justice was administered for Glaston Twelve Hides. The name may have been first used by John Collinson in his History and Antiquities of the County of Somerset in 1791, however when investigated by Richard Warner in 1826 he could not identify where the name had originated. It was also thought to be the site of trials by Judge Jeffreys for the Bloody Assizes after the Monmouth Rebellion.

The current building was constructed in the 15th century on the site of a wooden building dating from the 12th century. In the 16th century a new facade was added to the original building. It is possible that the stonework and window of the front wall were removed from the abbot's lodgings behind the great kitchen of the Abbey as similar features can be identified in a 1712 engraving, and it is known that the building was ruined and without its front wall by 1723.

The door is original and above it are the royal arms and a Tudor rose It is possible that the building was used as a hospice in the time of Abbot Richard Beere, as a document of 1716 describes "Beere's Hospital" although it is uncertain whether this is the same building. Clearer documentary evidence shows that it was used as a "commercial school for young gentlemen" in the second half of the 18th century. It is now in the guardianship of English Heritage and managed by Glastonbury Town Council.

== Architecture ==
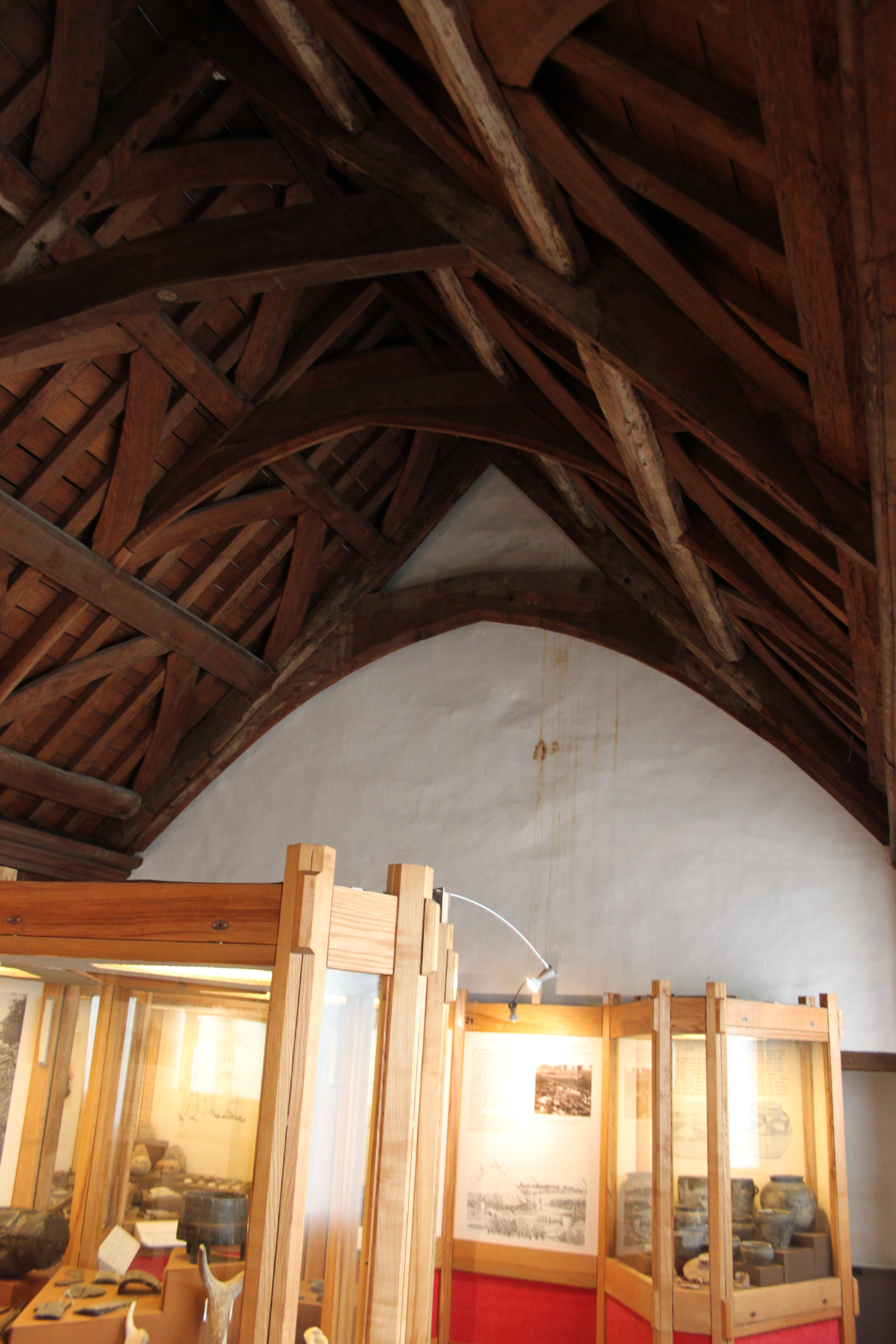
The roof at the front of the building

The building has two rooms and an attached kitchen on the ground floor with a staircase between them leading to the living quarters in the first floor rooms. The front room may originally have been a shop but was not used for trade after the installation of the new front wall in the 16th century. The front room has recesses on either side of the arched fireplace. The rear room on the ground floor was the hall and still has its 16th-century ceiling panels and four-light window. The ceiling has plaster decorations from the Elizabethan era, when the kitchen block was also added.

The wooden stairs leading to the first floor replaced an earlier stone staircase, the remains of which can be seen protruding from the walls. The front room on the first floor had previously been partitioned, but the larger space was created when the new front wall was added to the building. Its roof has arched braced wooden trusses. The rear room still has the remains of a large fireplace, however, the chimney was blocked when the downstairs fireplace was installed.

== Glastonbury Museum at the Tribunal ==
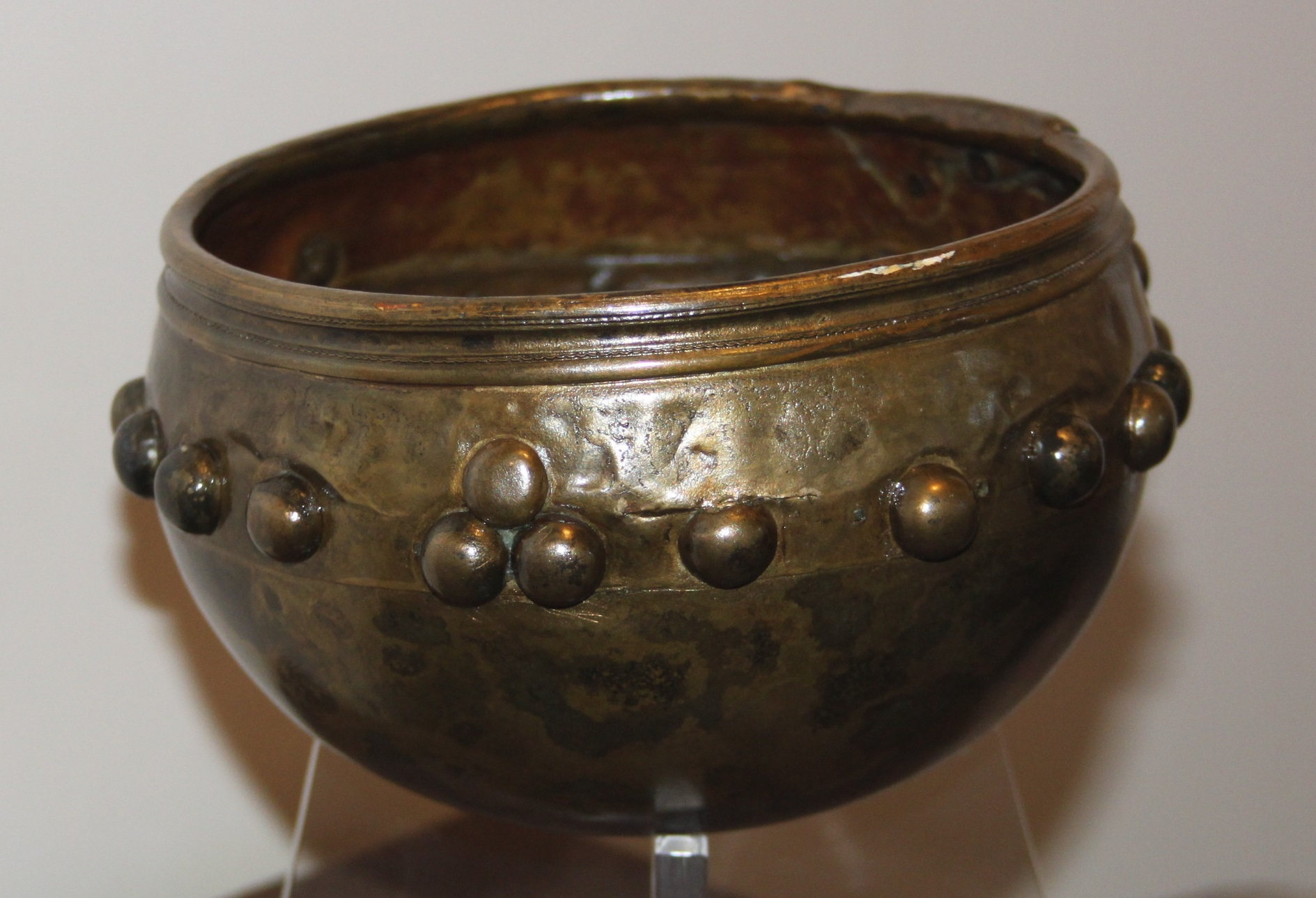
The Glastonbury Bowl

The building now houses Glastonbury Museum at the Tribunal containing artefacts from the town and from the Iron Age Glastonbury Lake Village, a "crannog" or man made island, which were preserved in almost perfect condition in the peat after the village was abandoned. Glastonbury Lake Village was an Iron Age village on the Somerset Levels near Godney, some 3 miles (5 km) north west of Glastonbury. and covers an area of 400 feet (122 m) north to south by 300 feet (91 m) east to west.

The village was built in about 300 BC and occupied into the early Roman period (around 100AD) when it was abandoned, possibly due to a rise in the water level. It was built on a morass on an artificial foundation of timber filled with brushwood, bracken, rubble and clay. The village housed around 100 people in five to seven groups of houses, each for an extended family, with sheds and barns, made of hazel and willow covered with reeds, and surrounded either permanently or at certain times by a wooden palisade. At its maximum it may have had 15 houses with a population of up to 200 people.

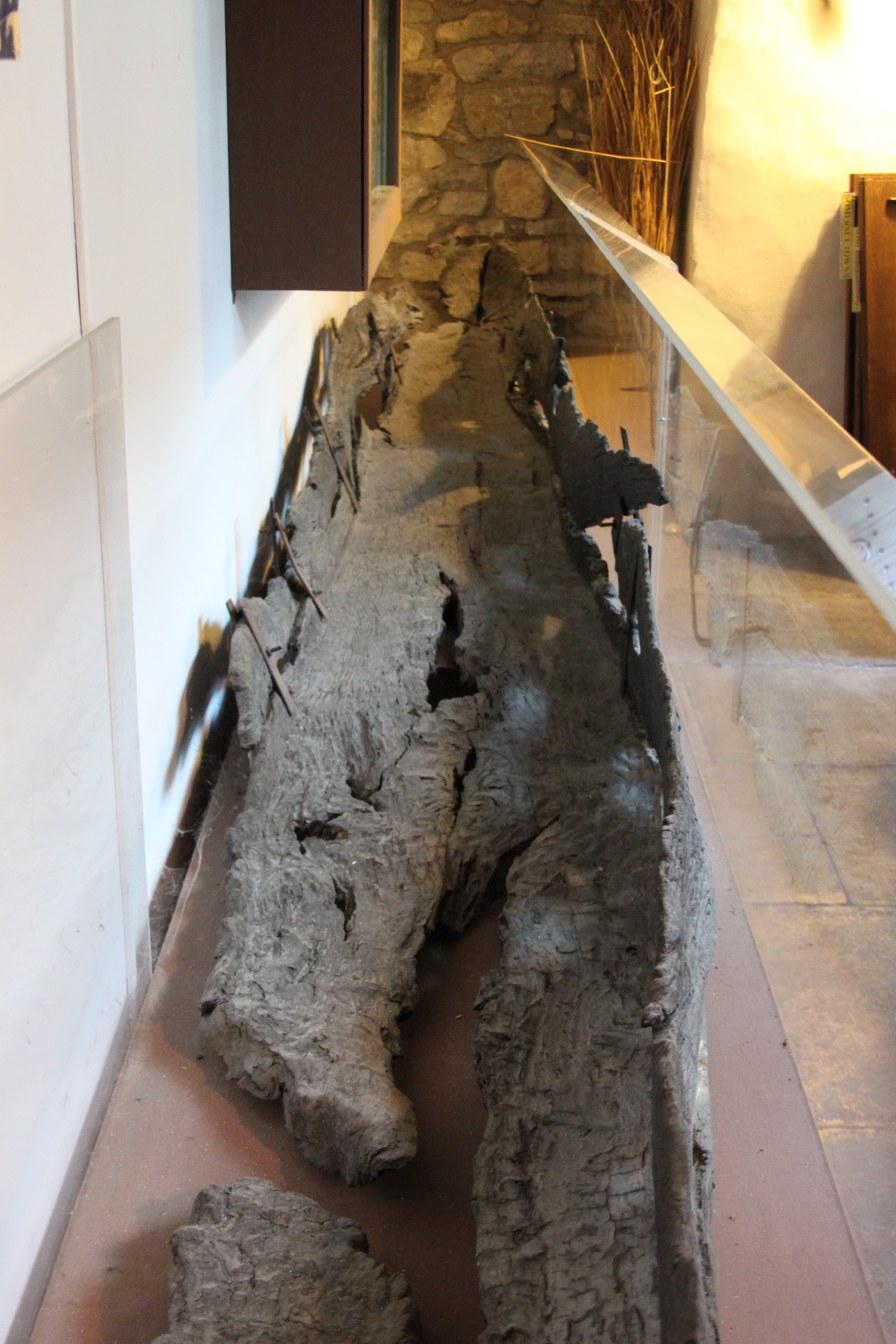
The log canoe

The exhibits include the metal "Glastonbury Bowl". It was made from two sections riveted together and repaired several times over its life. The bottom half has been dated as having been constructed in the Iron Age. The upper half was probably added in the 1st century from one sheet of metal, which may have been previously used for another purpose, and the two halves riveted together. Other artefacts that form the village include a clay tuyère from a pair of bellows, whetstones, iron knives and iron currency bars, which could be used as tokens and exchanged for goods. Some original storage jars are included in the displays which were re assembled by Arthur Bulleid, who discovered the site in 1892. In the Tudor kitchen at the rear of the building is an 8th/9th century AD log canoe which was discovered near the lake village.

The museum is run by Glastonbury Town Council, with exhibitions curated by the Glastonbury Antiquarian Society.

== See also ==
- Grade I listed buildings in Mendip
