= Harold St George Gray =

British archaeologist

- Born: 15 January 1872; Lichfield, England
- Died: 28 February 1963 (aged 91)
- Known for: Excavation of Avebury, Cadbury Camp, Glastonbury Lake Village and Meare Lake Village
- Spouse: Florence St George Gray (née Young)
- Scientific career
- Fields: Archaeology

Harold St George Gray (born Harold Gray, 15 January 1872 – 28 February 1963) was a British archaeologist. He was involved in the Pitt Rivers Museum in Oxford and later was the librarian-curator of the Museum for the Somerset Archaeological and Natural History Society. He excavated at various sites in the South West of England, including Arbor Low, Glastonbury Lake Village, Avebury, and Windmill Hill.

Gray was born in 1872 in Lichfield. In 1888 he started working for the archaeologist Augustus Pitt Rivers and trained in archaeological techniques and later took over as his secretary. In 1899 he became assistant to Henry Balfour at the Pitt Rivers Museum before leaving to become curator at the museum in Taunton, which later became the Museum of Somerset, where he stayed until 1949 and wrote frequent papers for their journal. During this time he was involved in the dismissal of Frederick Bligh Bond as archaeologist at Glastonbury Abbey when he claimed that much of his work was helped by the "spirits of Glastonbury monks".

Gray married Florence Young in 1899, and they had a son, Lionel. Florence took part in excavations and field walking with Gray, and also carried out post-excavation work at the museum in Taunton.

In 1943 Gray bought the Treasurer's House in Martock to preserve it. His wife bequeathed it to the National Trust in 1970. Gray was president of the Somerset Archaeological and Natural History Society from 1951 to 1952 and died in 1963.

== Archaeological excavations ==
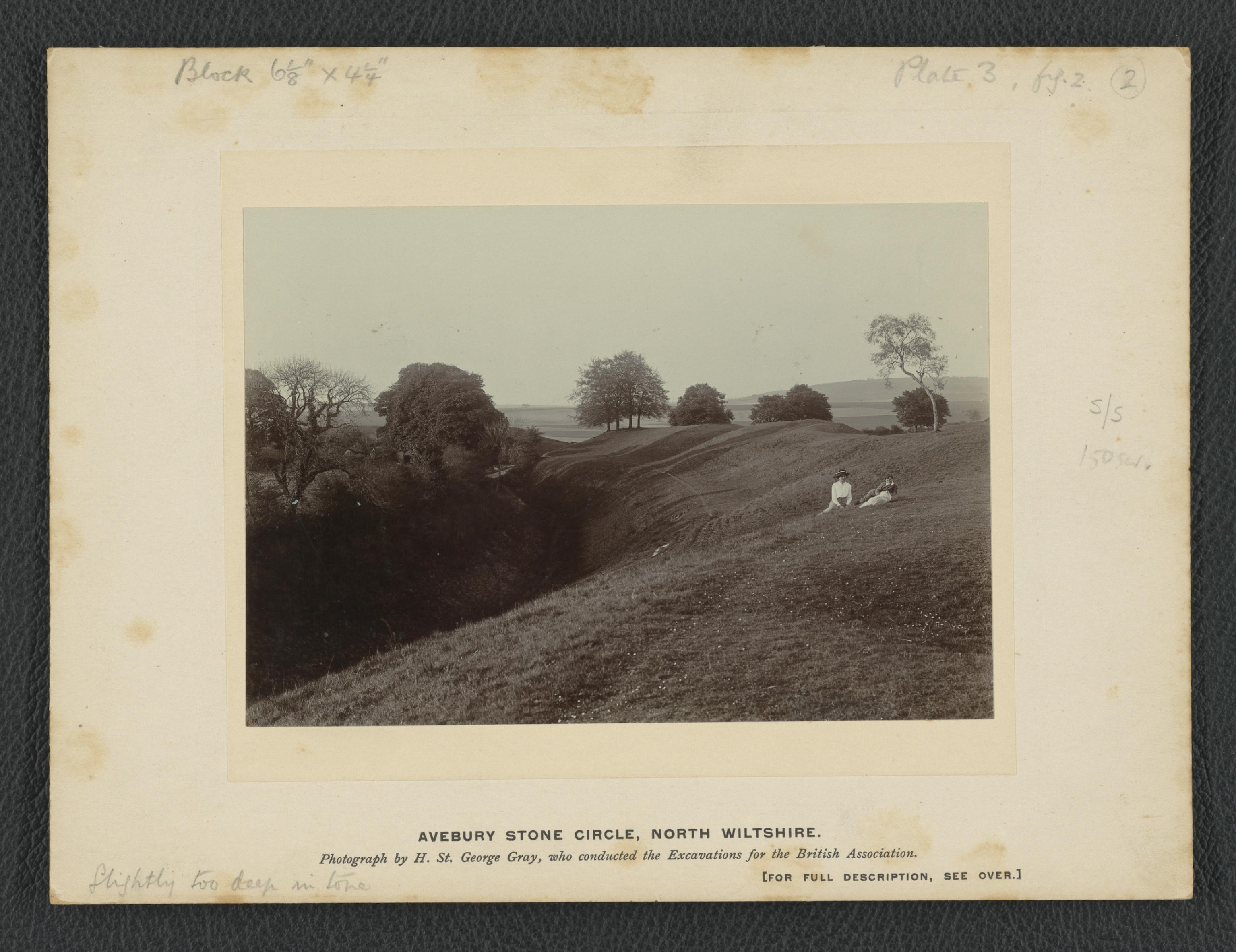
A photograph of the Avebury ditch showing Florence St George Gray and her son Lionel, taken on 28 April 1914, by Harold St George Gray.

=== Arbor Low ===
After leaving Pitt-Rivers he led the excavations at Arbor Low in 1901 and 1902, and then worked on the rings on Bodmin Moor.

=== Glastonbury Lake Village ===
In 1904 he was involved with Arthur Bulleid in the excavation of Glastonbury Lake Village and later at Meare Lake Village. One of Gray's contributions to archaeology was the scale of the excavations undertaken and the detailed records kept following the teaching of his mentor Pitt-Rivers. He also developed techniques of making three dimensional models of the sites.

=== Maumbury Rings ===
From 1908 to 1913 he was responsible for excavations at Maumbury Rings. Gray's report for the 1910 excavations notes that Florence St George Gray was responsible for restoring antlers, a human skull and other objects.

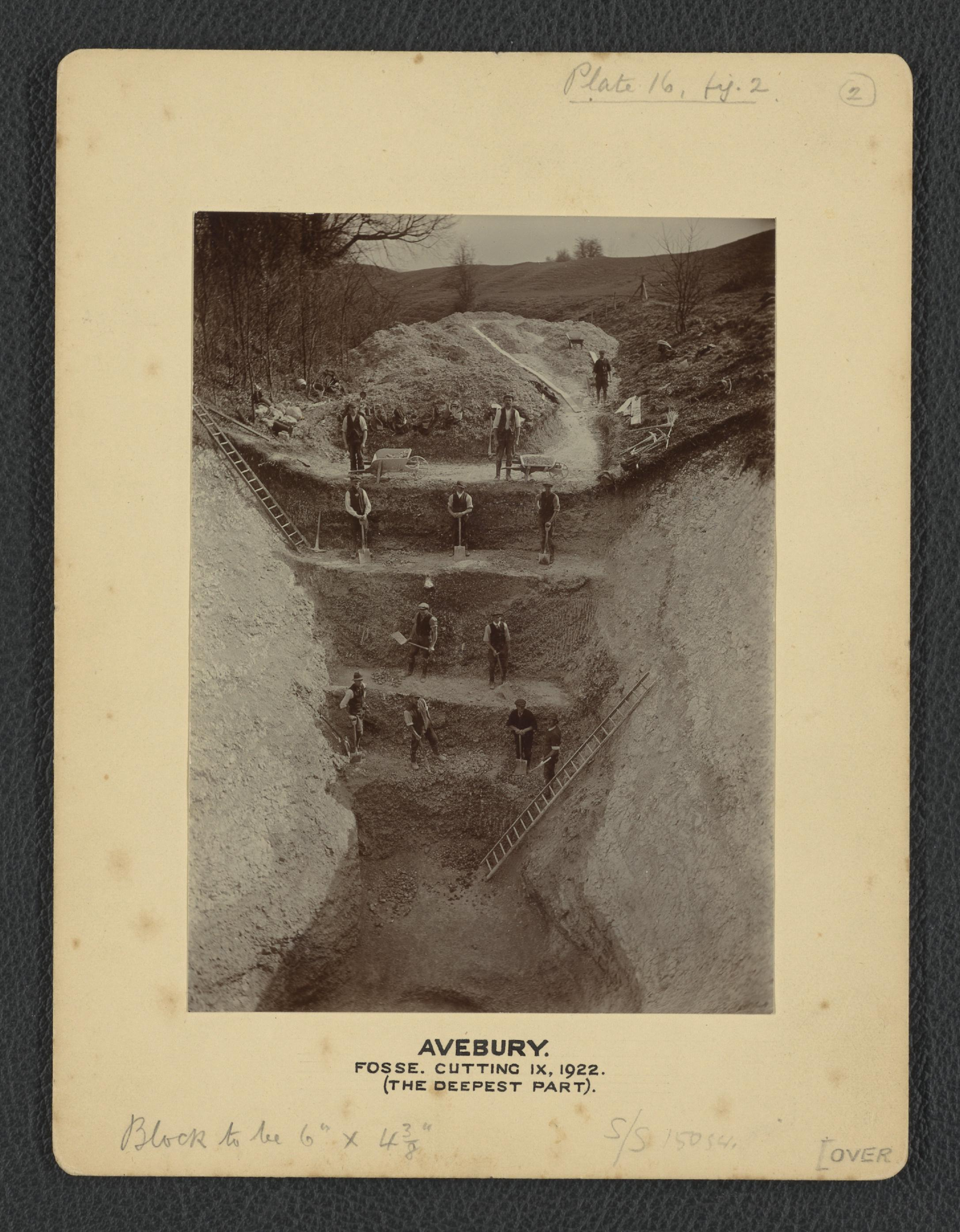
A photograph of excavations at Avebury ditch showing 12 workers, taken on 21 April 1922, by Harold St George Gray.

=== Avebury ===
Gray excavated for five seasons between 1908 and 1922 at Avebury (1908, 1909, 1911, 1914 and 1922). His discovery of over forty antler picks at or near the bottom of the henge ditch at Avebury proved that it had been dug out of solid chalk to a depth of 11 m (36 ft) using red deer antlers as picks. Excavations at Avebury were sponsored by the British Academy and private donors.

=== Cadbury Camp ===
In 1922 Gray excavated Cadbury Camp.

=== Windmill Hill ===
1926 to 1929 Gray worked at Windmill Hill, Avebury with Alexander Keiller.

== Publications ==
Gray, H. (1935). VI.—The Avebury Excavations, 1908—1922. Archaeologia, 84: 99-162. doi:10.1017/S0261340900013655
