= Holy Trinity Church, Godney =

Church in Somerset, England

Holy Trinity Church
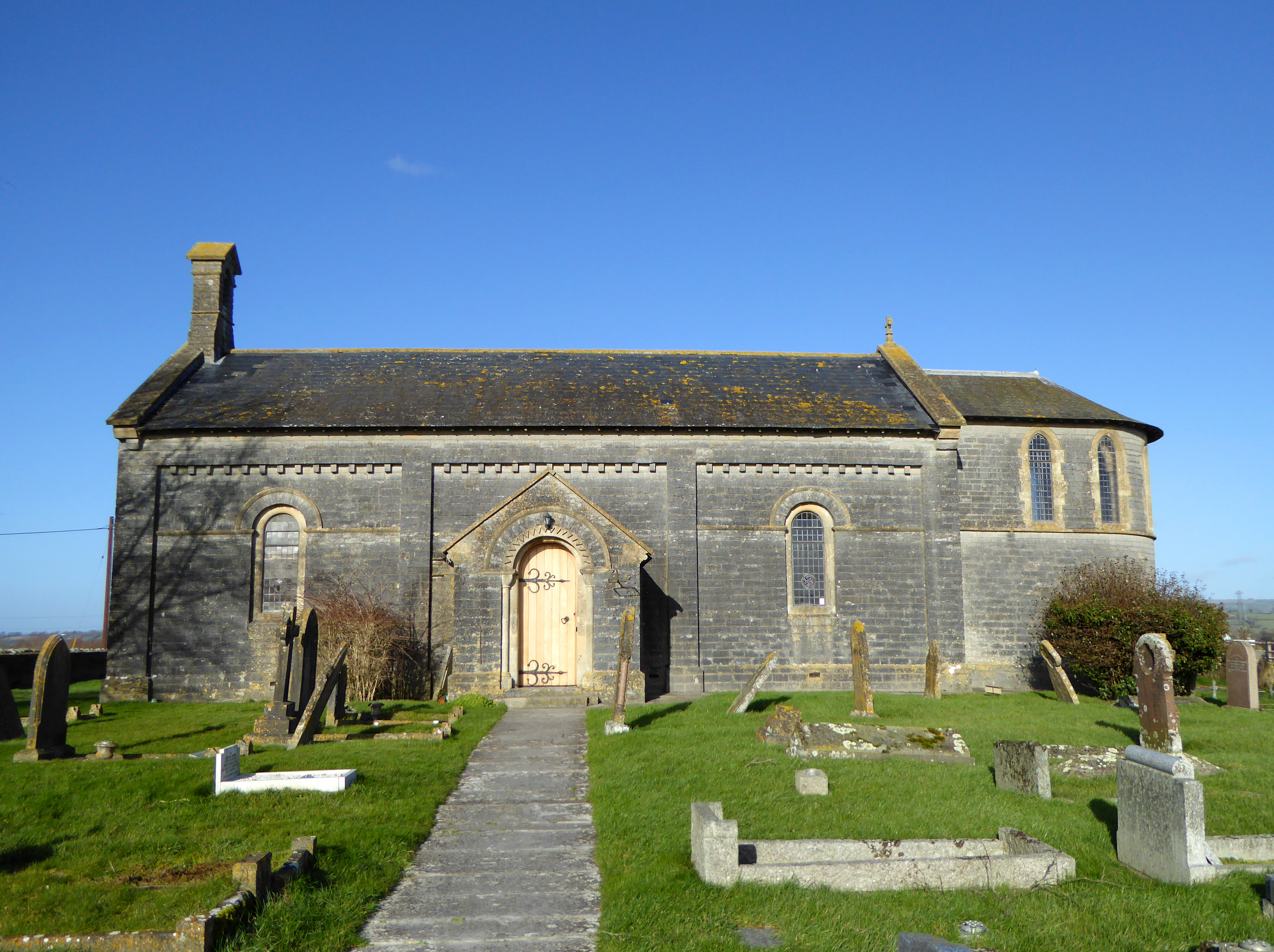

Religion
- Affiliation: Church of England
- Ecclesiastical or organizational status: Closed
- Year consecrated: 1841

Location
- Location: Godney, Somerset, England
- Interactive map of Holy Trinity Church
- Coordinates: 51.1793°N 2.7376°W

Architecture
- Architect: George Phillips Manners
- Type: Church
- Style: Romanesque

Holy Trinity Church is a former Church of England church in Godney, Somerset, England. Designed by George Phillips Manners, it was built in 1839–41 and made redundant in 1999. The church is now used for civil weddings and events as the Glastonbury Weddings and Events Venue. It is a Grade II listed building.

== History ==
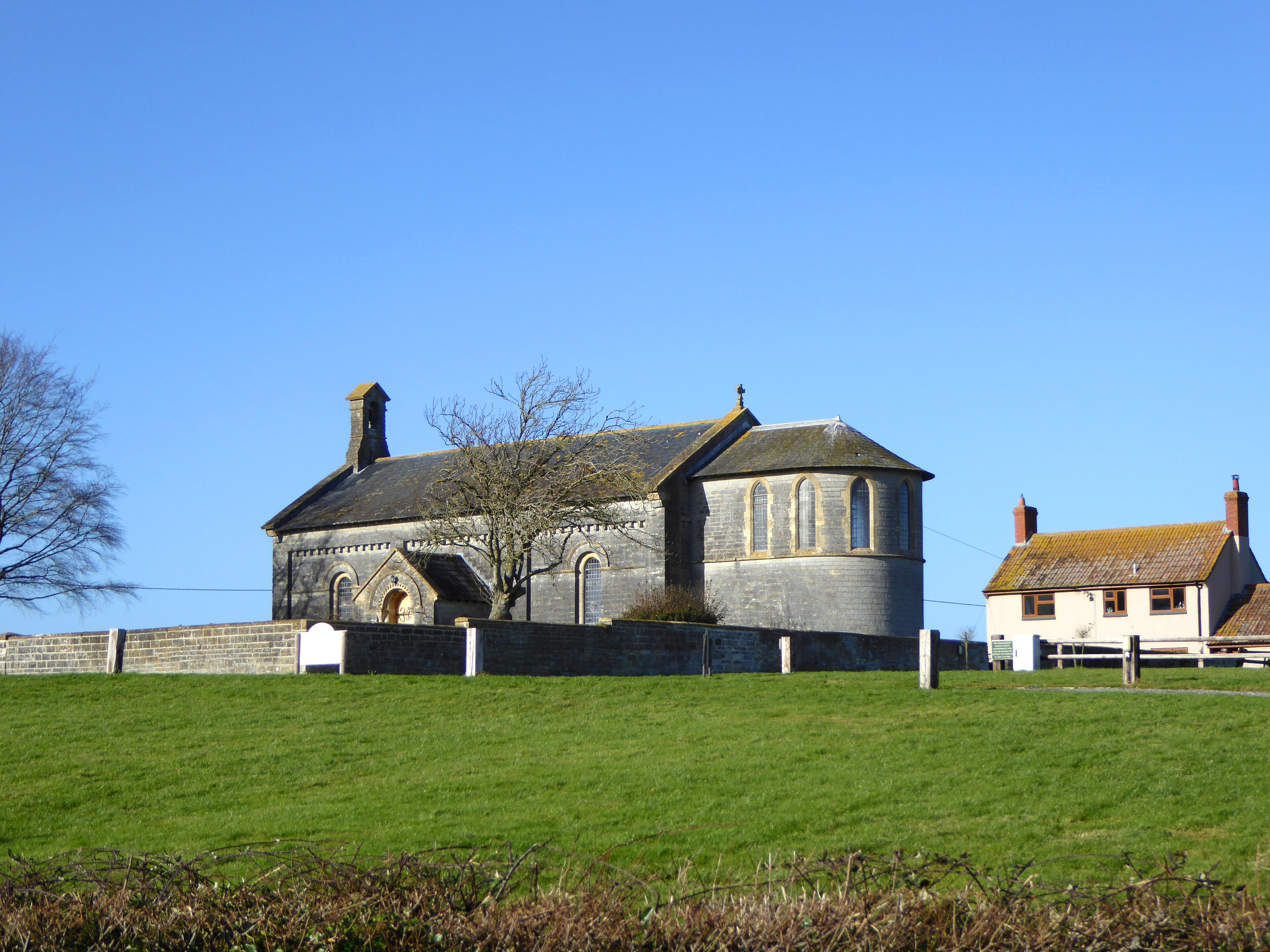
The former Holy Trinity as the Glastonbury Weddings and Events Venue.

A chapel dedicated to the Holy Trinity has existed at Godney since the 12th century, when one was in possession of Glastonbury Abbey. The chapel was later sold as part of Godney Manor after the Dissolution of the Monasteries in 1539. The chapel was abandoned by 1675 and a new place of worship was established at a new site by Peter Davis in 1737.

By 1838, Godney had a population of 270, but the chapel was in a poor state of repair and could only accommodate 80. Furthermore, residents of the village were unable to reach the parish church of St Mary at Meare during winter floods. A scheme was launched to rebuild and enlarge Godney's chapel to accommodate 250 people. Funds were raised by public subscription and grants, including £60 from the Bath and Wells Diocesan Church Building Association. The church was rebuilt in 1839–41 to the designs of George Phillips Manners of Bath and was consecrated by the Bishop of Bath and Wells, the Right Rev. George Henry Law, on 22 July 1841. Godney was made its own ecclesiastical parish in 1869.

The church was in need of restoration by the beginning of the 20th century, with the flooring, seating and gallery being in poor condition. Fundraising was led by the vicar of Godney, Rev. J. M. Alcock, and the restoration plans drawn up by the diocesan architect Edmund Buckle. The work, which included the construction of a chancel, was carried out in 1903 by Messrs J. Merrick and Son of Glastonbury with supervision by Mr. Buckle. The foundation stone of the new chancel was laid by Major Charles D. Sherston on 20 July 1903. The work cost £700 to £800 and included the removal of the gallery and installation of new pews of pitch pine. The flooring was also concreted and relaid with wooden blocks. A new oak pulpit was added in memory of the late vicar of Godney, Rev. William J. Marshall.

The church reopened on 12 December 1903. The Bishop of Bath and Wells, who had attended the chancel's foundation stone ceremony, had agreed to perform the reopening service, but was unable to attend due to illness. The Assistant Bishop, Rev. Waite Stirling, conducted the service on his behalf.

A new organ was dedicated at the church on 17 December 1908. It was built by the Positive Organ Company for £150 and funded by public subscription and a £60 donation from the philanthropist Andrew Carnegie. On 22 October 1911, an oak screen, erected to form a vestry at the west end of the nave, was dedicated by the Bishop of Bath and Wells, the Right Rev. George Kennion. It marked the completion of the restoration scheme of 1903.

Godney was a sole benefice until it was united with St John's at Glastonbury in 1972. In 1985, it became part of the Abbey Five Benefice with Glastonbury, Meare, and West Pennard. Repairs were carried out in 1980 for a cost of £2,700, which included the replacement of plasterwork and repair of the roof. Holy Trinity closed in 1998 and was declared redundant on 1 July 1999. The pews were removed in 2001 and the church then used for storage. In 2016, planning permission was obtained to use the church as a venue for civil weddings. The conversion work included the installation of a kitchen and toilets. It is now known as the Glastonbury Wedding Venue.

== Architecture ==
Holy Trinity is built of Blue Lias ashlar with slate roofs. It was originally made up of a three-bay nave, east vestry and south porch, with a gallery at the west end of nave and a bellcote on the west gable. The apsidal chancel was added in 1903, replacing the original east vestry, and a new vestry was formed at the west end of the nave. With the rebuilding of the church in 1839, heraldic glass of late 16th century origin was installed from a house recently demolished at Lillington. The churchyard wall dates to 1839 and is also Grade II listed.
