= Peat Moors Centre =

Former museum in Somerset, England

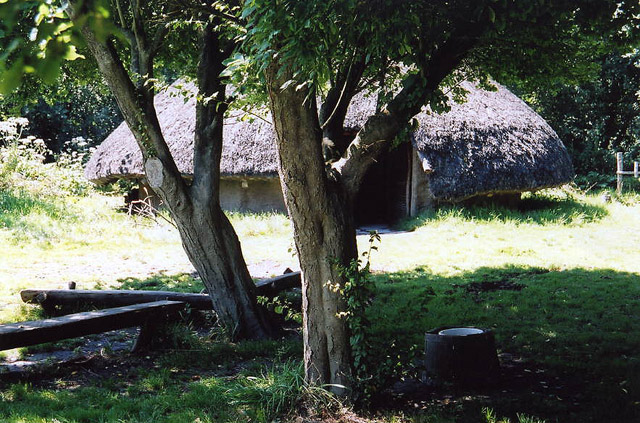

- Location within Somerset and the United Kingdom
- Location: Westhay, Nr Glastonbury, Somerset
- Coordinates: 51.1789°N 2.8096°W
- Website: Centre web site

The Peat Moors Centre lay on the road between Shapwick and Westhay in Somerset, England. The centre was run by the Somerset Historic Environment Service, but Somerset County Council closed it in October 2009 in the course of budget cuts.

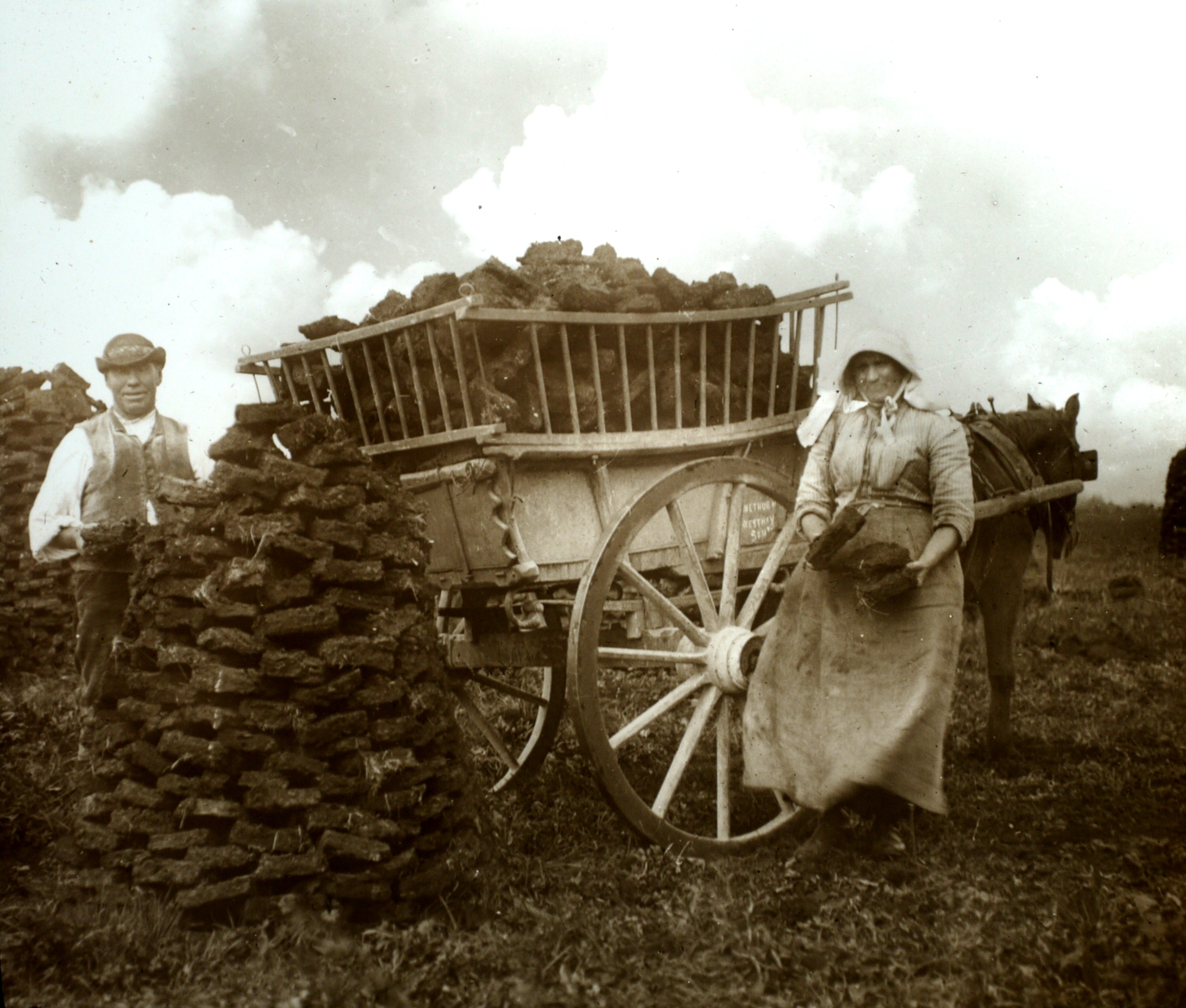
Peat gatherers at Westhay, somerset levels

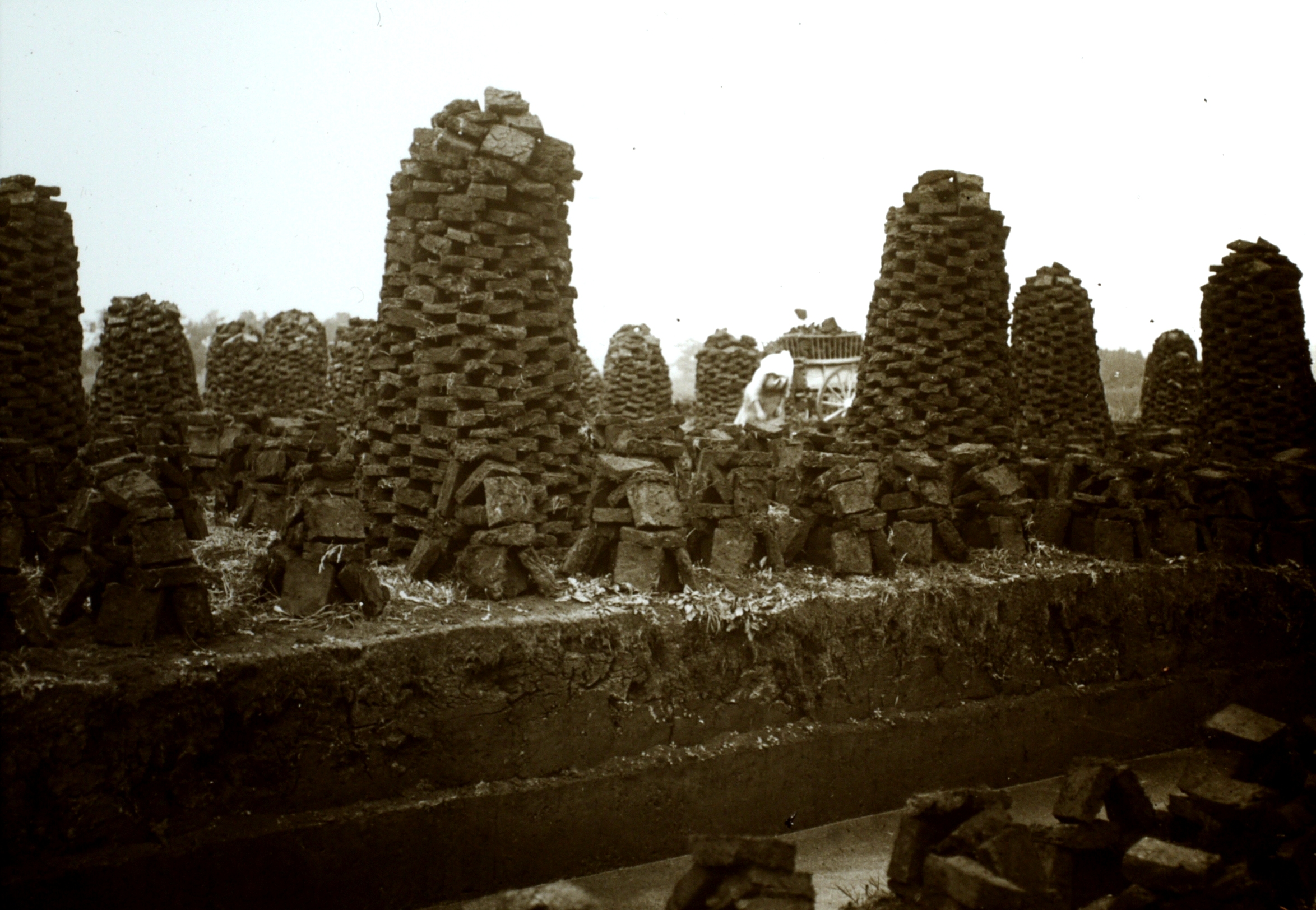
Peat stacks and cutting at Westhay, somerset levels

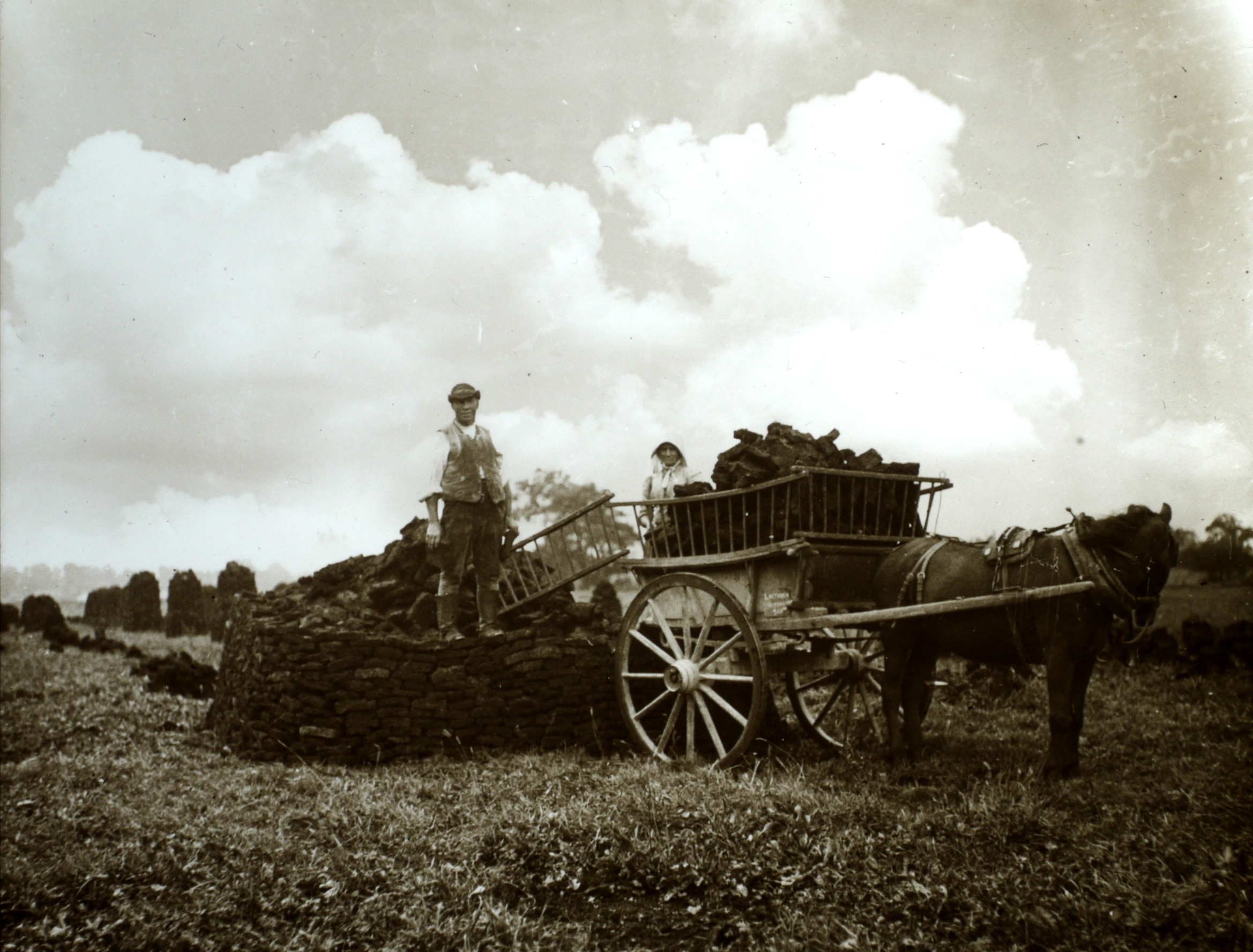
Harvesting the peat at Westhay, somerset levels

The museum was dedicated to the archaeology, history and geology of the Somerset Levels. It also included reconstructions of some of the archaeological discoveries, including a number of Iron Age round houses from Glastonbury Lake Village, and the world's oldest engineered highway, the Sweet Track. From time to time the centre offered courses in a number of ancient technologies in subjects including textiles, clothing and basket making, as well as staging various open days, displays and demonstrations.

Somerset County Council, the owners of the Peat Moors Centre, closed the centre for budgetary reasons on 31 October 2009. The former staff hoped to launch a successor to the centre, run by a community interest company, to be known as the 'Somerset Lake Village Project' and involving the reconstruction of an Iron Age lake village.

== See also ==
- Somerset Levels
