= Post Track =

Ancient causeway in Somerset, England

The Post Track is an ancient causeway in the valley of the River Brue on the Somerset Levels, England. It is dated back to around 3838 BCE, making it some 30 years older than the Sweet Track in the same area. Various sections have been scheduled as ancient monuments.

The timber trackway was constructed of long ash planks, with lime and hazel posts spaced along three-metre intervals. According to Coles, the heavy planks of the Post Track were rarely pegged. The track follows closely in line with the Sweet Track and, before the planks were dated, it was posited that it served as a construction platform for the Sweet Track. It is speculated that it led to places of spiritual significance. It is likely that the route was intended to be a permanent fixture, with the track being updated, maintained, and eventually replaced as it succumbed to the elements. Some of the wood planks were also reused in the Sweet Track when it was built, making the specific dating more complex.

== See also ==
- Ancient trackway
- Sweet track
- Historic roads and trails
