= Meare Pool =

Lake in the Somerset Levels, England

Coordinates: 51°10′45″N 2°46′52″W

Meare Pool (also known as Ferlingmere, Ferran Mere or Meare fish pool) was a lake in the Somerset Levels in South West England. Lake villages existed there in prehistoric times. During medieval times it was an important fishery, but following extensive drainage works it had disappeared from maps in the 18th century.

== Location ==
Meare Pool was formed by water ponding-up behind the raised peat bogs between the Wedmore and the Polden Hills, and core samples have shown that it is filled with at least 2 metres (6.6 ft) of detritus mud, especially in the Subatlantic climatic period (1st millennium BC).

Meare Pool was located on low-lying levels just north of Meare. Its precise boundaries varied according to season, and, over the longer term, as efforts were made to drain the area. Early 16th-century surveys variously describe it as being up to a mile and a half wide and having a circumference of between 2.5 and 5 miles. The south end was bordered by the high ground that the village of Meare is built upon. The pond would have extended no further west than the current Westhay to Wedmore road, where a shelf of rock formed a natural boundary. To the north lies the Godney ridge. The eastern extent is harder to determine, and it may have gone as far as the site of the Glastonbury Lake Village.

== Prehistory ==
In prehistoric times there were two Meare Lake Villages situated within the lake, occupied at different times between 300 BCE and 100 CE, similar to the nearby Glastonbury Lake Village. The Meare villages were discovered in 1895 but excavation did not start until 1908. More recent studies have shown that the villages were formed by laying dried clay over the Sphagnum Moss of the bog. The pool at that time was at least 2 miles (3.2 km) long by 1 mile (1.6 km) wide.

== Fishery ==
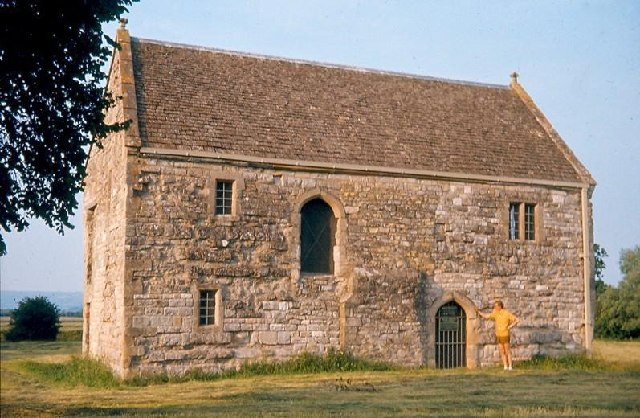
Meare Fish House

In the Domesday Book of 1086 the village of Meare is recorded as supporting "10 fishermen and 3 fisheries paying 20 pence". At the time of the Dissolution in 1540, Meare Pool was said to contain a great abundance of pike, tench, roach and eels. In 1638 it was owned by William Freake, who described it as "lately a fish pool".

In the 14th century a Fish House was built at Meare for the chief fisherman of the Abbot of Glastonbury that was also used for salting and preparing fish. It is the only surviving monastic fishery building in England. The importance of this industry is illustrated by a series of acrimonious disputes between Glastonbury and the Dean and Chapter of Wells Cathedral. Glastonbury Abbey required fish on Fridays, fast days and during Lent. As many as 5000 eels were landed in a typical year.

There were also three fishponds which would have allowed fish to have been bred or stored.

== Drainage ==
In early times the Meare Pool collected the waters of the rivers Brue and Sheppey, and discharged in a northerly direction into the Lower River Axe. In the later years of the 12th century the Abbey diverted the Brue to flow westwards, perhaps largely through natural channels, from Meare Pool to join the river Parrett. Further reclamation was carried out in stages between about 1620 and 1740, with the "new Cutts" (or Decoy Rhyne) being built about 1660. The rivers Sheppey and Hartlake were canalised into the River James Wear and Division Rhyne sometime in the late 1730s.

Early drainage work was carried out in the later years of the 12th century, with the responsibility for maintaining all the watercourses between Glastonbury and the sea being placed on named individuals among whom were Ralph de Sancta Barbara of Brentmarsh. Drainage of the surrounding area by monks of Glastonbury Abbey had reduced the size of the lake to 500 acres (200 ha) at the time of the Dissolution of the Monasteries. Meare Pool had disappeared from maps by 1749.

== Legacy ==
Current Ordnance Survey maps show Meare Pool as a placename in an area with spot heights of 4m. The 14th-century fish house has been designated as a Grade I listed building and Scheduled Ancient Monument and is now in the care of English Heritage.

In the Second World War a pillbox was located at Meare Pool at the confluence of the Decoy Rhyne and Whitelake River.
