= John Coles (historian) =

Canadian–British archaeologist and academic (1930–2020)

John Coles FBA, FSA, HonFSAScot
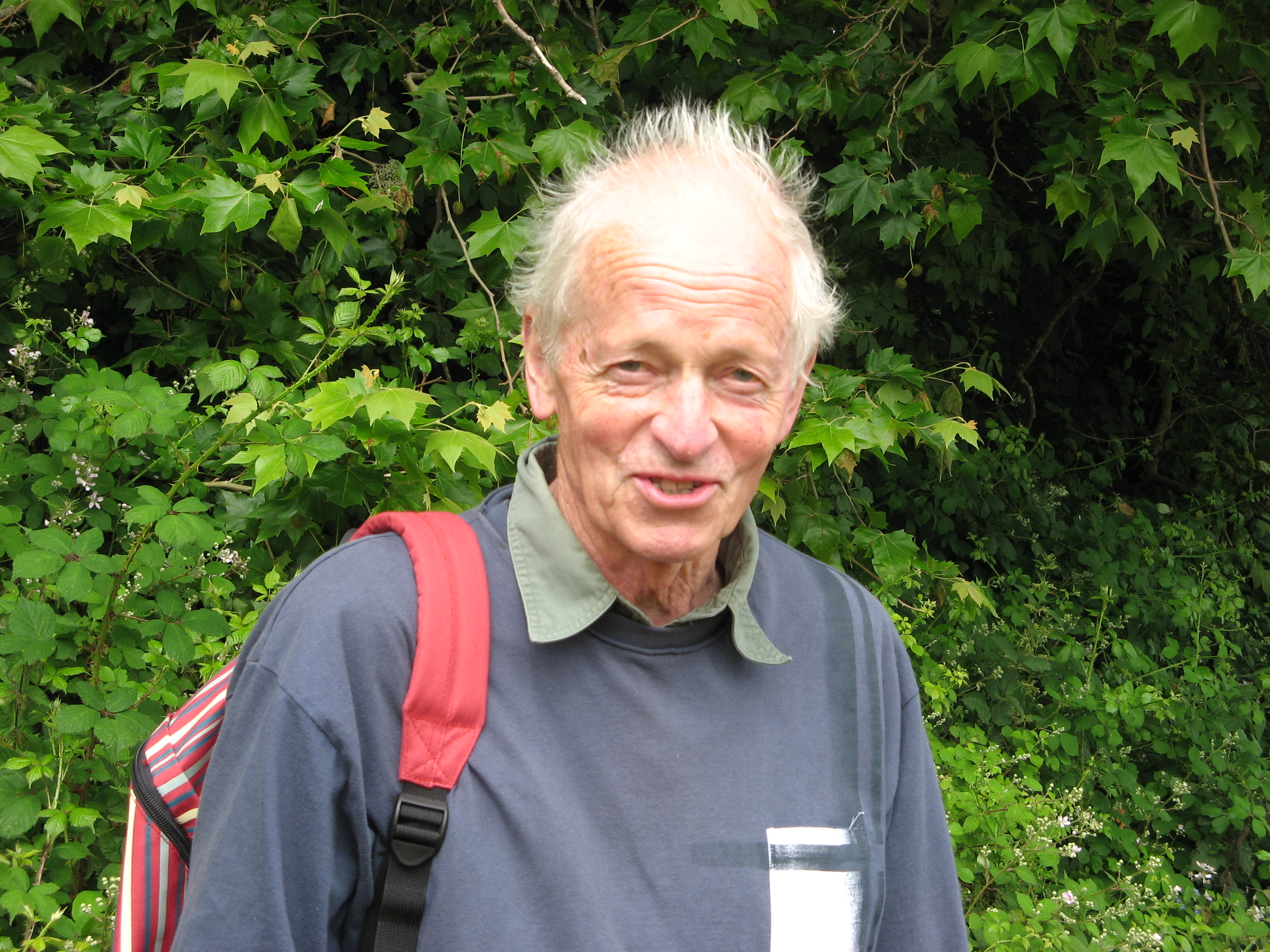
- Born: John Morton Coles; 30 March 1930; Woodstock, Ontario, Canada
- Died: 14 October 2020 (aged 90); Devon, England
- Education: University of Toronto; University of Cambridge; University of Edinburgh
- Occupations: Archaeologist and academic
- Spouse: Bryony Coles (m. 1985)
- Awards: Grahame Clark Medal of the British Academy; Gold Medal of the Society of Antiquaries of London; Gold Medal of the Royal Swedish Academy of Letters, History and Antiquities

John Morton Coles, FBA, FSA, HonFSAScot (25 March 1930 – 14 October 2020) was a Canadian–British archaeologist and academic.

== Life and career ==
Coles was born in Woodstock, Ontario, Canada, on 25 March 1930. He graduated from the University of Toronto in 1952, before working in commerce for three years. He began studying archaeology at the University of Cambridge in 1955, before moving to the University of Edinburgh to complete his PhD in 1957.

He began teaching at the University of Cambridge in 1960 and was Director of Studies to Prince Charles while the prince studied at Trinity College.

In 1979 he published, The Bronze Age in Europe: An introduction to the prehistory of Europe c.2000-700 BC, cowritten by A. F. Harding.

Coles became professor of European Prehistory in 1980 and was a fellow of Fitzwilliam College, Cambridge, from 1963 until his death.

Coles married archaeologist Bryony Coles in 1985, and in 1986 he left the University of Cambridge and they moved to Devon. The couple did extensive research into the Somerset Levels, which resulted in the establishment of a new branch of archaeology focusing on wetlands, and in 1998, they received the Imperial Chemical Industries (ICI) Award.

Coles died at home on 14 October 2020.

== Honours and awards ==
Coles held a higher doctorate (DSc) from the University of Cambridge. He was elected a Fellow of the Society of Antiquaries of London in 1963 and a Fellow of the British Academy (the United Kingdom's national academy for the humanities) in 1978. He received an honorary doctorate from Uppsala University, and was awarded the Grahame Clark Medal of the British Academy (1995), the Gold Medal of the Society of Antiquaries of London (2002), and the Gold Medal of the Royal Swedish Academy of Letters, History and Antiquities (2009).
