= Bryony Coles =

British archaeologist

Professor Bryony Coles FBA FSA
- Born: Bryony Jean Orme; 1946 (age 79–80)
- Spouse: John Coles (m. 1985; died 2020)

Academic background
- Education: Bristol University; London Institute of Archaeology

Academic work
- Discipline: Prehistoric archaeology
- Institutions: University of Exeter

Bryony Jean Coles, FBA, FSA (born 12 August 1946) is a prehistoric archaeologist and academic. She is best known for her work studying the large area of land submerged beneath the North Sea around 8000 years ago and naming it Doggerland.

== Early life and education ==
Coles was born in 1946. She studied history at Bristol University before completing her postgraduate diploma at the London Institute of Archaeology and completing an MPhil in Anthropology at University College London.

== Academic career ==
Coles became a lecturer in prehistoric archaeology at the University of Exeter in 1972. She was promoted to Professor of Prehistoric Archaeology in 1996 and when she retired in 2008 she was appointed professor emeritus. Her work studying Doggerland began in the 1990s. Coles named Doggerland after Dogger Bank, a large sandbank in the southern North Sea. In 1998, Coles produced hypothetical maps of the area. Her 1998 article, Doggerland: a Speculative Survey, is described by the archaeologist Luc Amkreutz as "essential" to making Doggerland a serious subject of study.

As well as research into Doggerland, Coles has also done extensive research into wetland archaeology, particularly in the Somerset Levels alongside her husband, John Coles. Their work with the Somerset Levels Project resulted in the establishment of a new branch of archaeology focusing on wetlands and in 1998, they received the Imperial Chemical Industries (ICI) Award for the best archaeological project offering a major contribution to knowledge. Coles began also studying the European beaver after realising that a series of distinctive marks on preserved wood found in the Somerset Levels were made by beavers and not humans as first assumed. She mapped out the activities of beavers in Brittany for around 5 years so that she could learn how to see signs of beavers in the environment and to help differentiate between beaver and human activity in any future archaeological sites.

== Personal life ==
Coles was married to John Coles from 1985 until his death in 2020. They established The John and Bryony Coles Bursary in 1998. The bursary was created to help students who are travelling outside of their own country to study or work in prehistoric archaeology.

== Honours ==
On 27 November 1975, Coles was elected a Fellow of the Society of Antiquaries of London (FSA). In 2007, she was elected a Fellow of the British Academy (FBA), the United Kingdom's national academy for the humanities and social sciences.
