= Glaston Twelve Hides =

Historical Hundred of Somerset, England

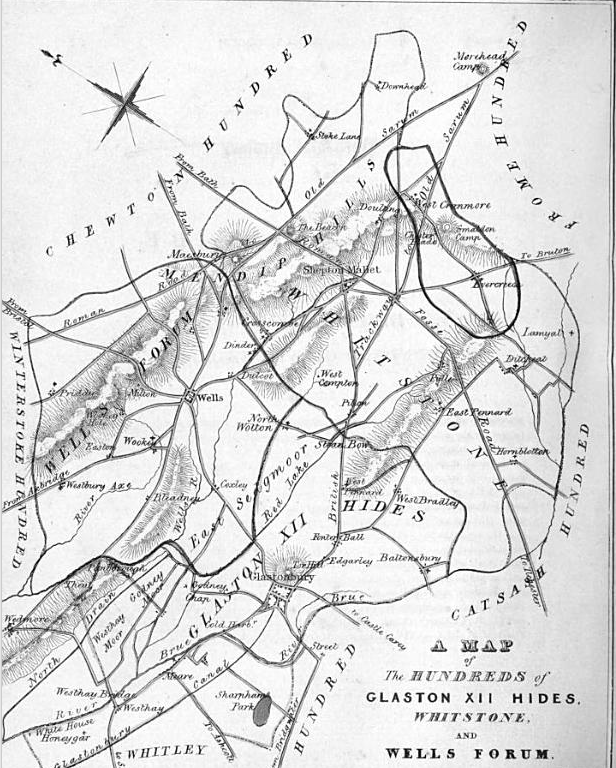
- A map of the hundreds of Glaston XII Hides, Whitstone, and Wells Forum
- Area
- 24,610 acres (9,960 ha)
- History
  - Created: unknown
- Status: Hundred
- Subdivisions
  - Type: Parishes
  - Units: Baltonsborough, West Bradley, Glastonbury, Meare, Nyland, West Pennard, and North Wootton

Glaston Twelve Hides is one of the 40 historical Hundreds in the ceremonial county of Somerset, England, dating from before the Norman conquest during the Anglo-Saxon era although exact dates are unknown. Each hundred had a 'fyrd', which acted as the local defence force and a court which was responsible for the maintenance of the frankpledge system. They also formed a unit for the collection of taxes. The role of the hundred court was described in the Dooms (laws) of King Edgar. The name of the hundred was normally that of its meeting-place.

The Hundred of Glaston Twelve Hides is thought to take its name from twelve hides of land belonging to Glastonbury Abbey that were exempt from paying danegeld, although the area of the hundred was much larger than the original twelve hides. It contained the parishes of Baltonsborough, West Bradley, Glastonbury, Meare, Nyland, West Pennard, and North Wootton, comprising approximately 24,610 acres (9,960 ha).

The importance of the hundred courts declined from the seventeenth century. By the 19th century several different single-purpose subdivisions of counties, such as poor law unions, sanitary districts, and highway districts sprang up, filling the administrative role previously played by parishes and hundreds. Although the Hundreds have never been formally abolished, their functions ended with the establishment of county courts in 1867 and the introduction of districts by the Local Government Act 1894.
