= Meare =

Village and civil parish in Somerset, England

Coordinates: 51.1700°N 2.7789°W

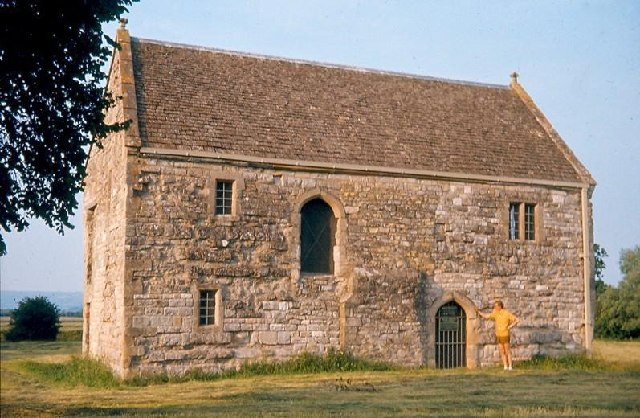
- Meare Fish House

- Location within Somerset
- Population: 1,304 (2011 Census)
- OS grid reference: ST455415
- Civil parish: Meare
- Unitary authority: Somerset Council
- Ceremonial county: Somerset
- Region: South West
- Country: England
- Sovereign state: United Kingdom
- Post town: GLASTONBURY
- Postcode district: BA6
- Dialling code: 01458
- Police: Avon and Somerset
- Fire: Devon and Somerset
- Ambulance: South Western
- UK Parliament: Wells and Mendip Hills

Meare is a village and civil parish in Somerset, England, 3 miles (4.8 km) north-west of Glastonbury on the Somerset Levels. The parish includes the village of Westhay.

== History ==
Meare is a marshland village in typical Somerset "rhyne" country, standing on the site of pre-historic lake dwellings. The site of the Meare Lake Village is marked by groups of mounds. It has been occupied for thousands of years and some of the archaeological finds are now being reported.

A 14th-century fish house at Meare was once the abode of Glastonbury Abbey fishermen, who fished the, now drained, Meare Pool. The Manor Farmhouse was built at the same time as the summer residence of the Abbots from Glastonbury Abbey and is now a farmhouse. Along with its outbuildings the farmhouse has been designated as a Grade I listed building.

The parish was part of the hundred of Glaston Twelve Hides.

== Governance ==
The parish council has responsibility for local issues, including setting an annual precept (local rate) to cover the council's operating costs and producing annual accounts for public scrutiny. The parish council evaluates local planning applications and works with the local police, district council officers, and neighbourhood watch groups on matters of crime, security, and traffic. The parish council's role also includes initiating projects for the maintenance and repair of parish facilities, as well as consulting with the district council on the maintenance, repair, and improvement of highways, drainage, footpaths, public transport, and street cleaning. Conservation matters (including trees and listed buildings) and environmental issues are also the responsibility of the council.

For local government purposes, the village falls within the Somerset Council unitary authority area, which was created on 1 April 2023. From 1894 to 31 March 1974, the village was part of Wells Rural District, and from 1 April 1974 to 31 March 2023, it fell within of the non-metropolitan district of Mendip.

Meare is part of the electoral ward of Moor, which also includes Walton to the south. At the 2011 Census, the population of the ward was 2,540. The ward itself falls within the county constituency of Wells and Mendip Hills, which has been represented in the House of Commons of the Parliament of the United Kingdom by Tessa Munt of the Liberal Democrats since 2024.

== Religious sites ==
The parish Church of St Mary was formerly in the keeping of Glastonbury Abbey, and dates from 1323. It was built for Abbot Adam of Sodbury, and is a Grade I listed building.
