= Glastonbury Lake Village =

Former Iron Age village in Somerset, UK

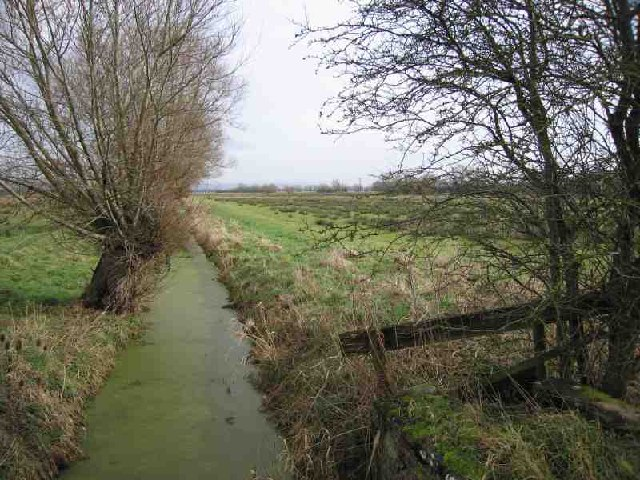
- Site of Glastonbury Lake Village
- Interactive map of Glastonbury Lake Village
- 51°09′49″N 02°43′33″W
- Type: Village site
- Periods: Iron Age
- Location: Near Glastonbury
- Region: Somerset, England

Site notes
- Condition: Ruin

Glastonbury Lake Village was an Iron Age village, situated on a crannog or man made island in the Somerset Levels, near Godney, some 3 miles (5 km) north west of Glastonbury in the southwestern English county of Somerset. It has been designated as a scheduled monument.

It has been described as "the best preserved prehistoric village ever found in the United Kingdom". The site covered an area of 400 feet (122 m) north to south by 300 feet (91 m) east to west. It was first constructed 250 B.C. by laying down timber and clay. Wooden houses and barns were then built on the clay base and occupied by up to 200 people at any time until the village was abandoned around 50 B.C.

The site was discovered by Arthur Bulleid in 1892 and excavated over the next 15 years. Artefacts uncovered include wooden and metal objects, many of which are now on display at The Tribunal in Glastonbury High Street, and in the Museum of Somerset in Taunton. Much of the timber was left at the site and soil put back on top of it as the best way to preserve it. Surveys in the late 20th and early 21st century have shown this to be effective, however the site is still at risk because of the risk of further drying out of the soil.

== History ==
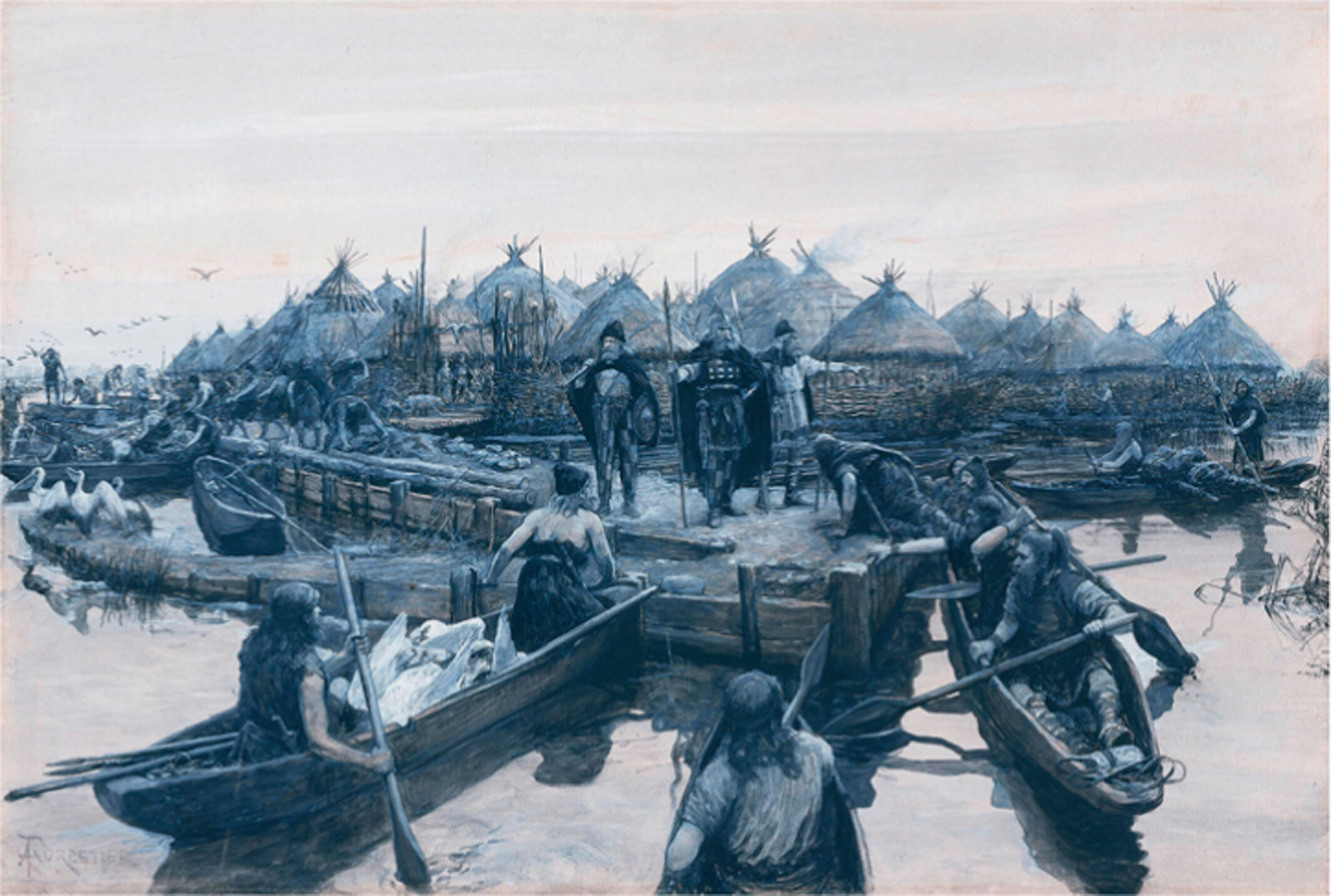
A representation of the landing stage by Amédée Forestier in 1911

The village was first built circa 250 B.C. and occupied until approximately 50 B.C. when it was abandoned, possibly due to a rise in the water level. It was built on a morass on an artificial foundation of timber filled with brushwood, bracken, rubble and clay. At least 1,000 tonnes (1,100 tons) of clay were transported to the site from higher ground around 1 kilometre (0.62 mi) away.

The village housed people in five to seven groups of round houses, each for an extended family, with sheds and barns, made of hazel and willow covered with reeds, and surrounded either permanently or at certain times by a wooden palisade. There were gaps in the palisade and is believed by Minnitt and Coles to have been used to stabilise the clay floors rather than for defensive purposes. At its maximum occupation the village may have had 15 houses in use with a population of up to 200 people. Two distinct phases of occupation have been identified. Early houses were timber framed square or rectangular and built of oak but later buildings were circular huts. Some of the clay spreads were used for barns or animal enclosures rather than houses.

The village was close to the old course of the River Brue and was thought to be surrounded by water, hence the title "Lake Village"; however more recent work suggests the title Swamp Village may be more appropriate as for most of the year the surrounding land was not open water. The Brue was an important water-borne trade route from central Somerset to the Severn Estuary. The village was approached by causeways up to 130 feet (40 m) long and log boats have been recovered from sites close to the village at what may have been a landing stage which was repaired and rebuilt several times. Despite the wet surroundings vegetable and small domesticated and wild mammals, including beaver and otter, made up more of the diet than fish. The remains of wheat, barley and beans have also been recovered.

=== Excavation ===
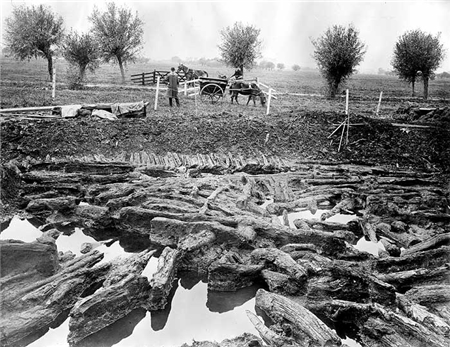
A photograph of the excavations at Glastonbury Lake Village

The lake village, a crannog or man made island, was discovered in 1892 by local medical student Arthur Bulleid, whose father was a local mayor and the founder of the Glastonbury Antiquarian Society. Bulleid had heard about the lake villages in Switzerland and believed similar sites could be found in his native Somerset.

The excavation of the area began in 1892 and continued over the next 15 years, uncovering the extent of the settlement and publishing the results. From 1892 until 1899 Bulleid worked with labourers for six months of each year and spent the other six months describing and cataloguing the finds. He then left the site to complete his medical studies and returned in 1904 with Harold St George Gray to continue the excavation until 1907. The curator of the Taunton museum of the Somerset Archaeological and Natural History Society, Gray had been trained in archaeological techniques by the archaeologist Augustus Pitt Rivers.

They found remains of the village. It consisted of a series of 89 mounds from 1.2 metres (3 ft 11 in) to 4.3 metres (14 ft) in diameter, made up of clay laid over the boggy ground, many of which had central hearths. The whole site was surrounded by a wooden palisade made from Alder. Each of the finds from large timber to small fragments of pottery were drawn and described with some also being photographed. In 1909 the site was visited by George V while he was the Prince of Wales, along with his wife. They were given a silver replica of the Glastonbury Bowl.

Much of the timber was reburied as the best way of preserving it, and a survey in 2005 found this to have been quite successful, despite reports warning of the area drying out and the peat coverage being reduced. The site is included in the Heritage at Risk Register produced by English Heritage because of the risk to the buried timbers if the site dries out further.

Bulleid and Gray later went on to excavate a similar site at Meare Lake Village approximately 2 kilometres (1.2 mi) south west of the Glastonbury site.

Small scale excavations were later carried out on the site by Michael Avery (unpublished), the Somerset Levels Project, Somerset County Council Heritage Service and the South West Heritage Trust. A film is available about the most recent excavations.

The landscape of the settlement has been modelled in 3D and turned into a short film. A replica of the canoe from the site has also been made and launched.

== Artefacts ==
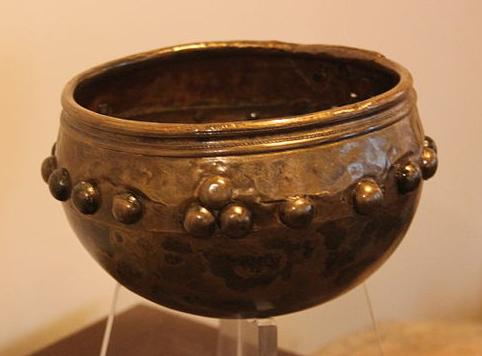
Glastonbury Bowl on display at The Tribunal.

The site and the finds from it are the property of the Glastonbury Antiquarian Society. Many of the finds from the site are on display in the Glastonbury Lake Village Museum at The Tribunal in Glastonbury High Street, and in the Museum of Somerset in Taunton. The burial sites of ten new born babies were uncovered, but there was no evidence of the interment of adults from the village.

The artefacts recovered include fragments of pottery, charcoal, bone and a whetstone (a stone for sharpening blades). Later, on excavation, spinning whorls and weaving combs were found, suggesting textile production, although this may have been for domestic use rather than industry. Evidence of bronze-casting and iron-smelting were found. Fine jewellery made from bronze bone have also been found showing a high degree of craftsmanship. Files and hammer heads were examined by metallography which showed that carbon compositions were found to be generally low. In 1905 an early British tin coin was discovered, believed to be from the 1st century A.D, which was sent to the British Museum. Various other objects from the excavation are also held by the British Museum.

=== Bronze bowl ===
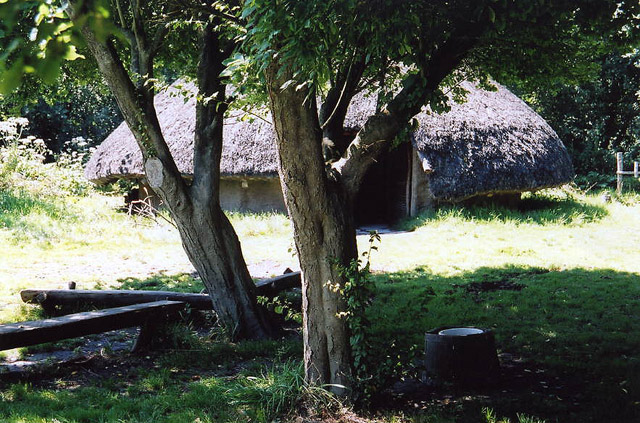
Reconstruction of a roundhouse at the Peat Moors Centre

The metal "Glastonbury Bowl" was made from two sections riveted together and repaired several times over its life. The bottom half has been dated as having been constructed in the Iron Age. The upper half was probably added in the 1st century from one sheet of metal, which may have been previously used for another purpose, and the two-halves riveted together.

=== Wooden objects ===
The site yielded a number of wooden objects preserved in the peaty soil including five wheel spokes and an unfinished nave to be used as the hub of a wheel. Woven baskets recovered from the site provided evidence of woven baskets up to 700 millimetres (28 in) in width and 480 millimetres (19 in) in height. A wooden frame for stretching animal skins were also recovered along with a shaker and dice made from antlers.

Representations of the houses were recreated at the nearby Peat Moors Centre, run by Somerset County Council, before its closure in 2009.

== See also ==
- List of hillforts and ancient settlements in Somerset

== Bibliography ==
- Aalbersberg, Gerard; Brown, Tony (2011). "The Environment and Context of the Glastonbury Lake Village: A Re-assessment". Journal of Wetland Archaeology. 10 (1): 136–151. Bibcode:2011JWetA..10..136A. doi:10.1179/jwa.2011.10.1.136. S2CID 140634991.
- Adkins, Lesley; Adkins, Roy (1992). A field guide to Somerset archaeology. Wimborne: Dovecote Press. ISBN 978-0-946159-94-9.
- Brunning, Richard (2006). Wet and Wonderful: The Heritage of the Avalon Marshes. Somerset Heritage Service. ISBN 978-0861833801.
- Brunning, Richard (2013). The Lost Islands of Somerset. Somerset Heritage Service. ISBN 9780861833962.
- Coles, John; Minnitt, Stephen (1995). Industrious and Fairly Civilised: The Glastonbury Lake Village. Somerset Levels Project. ISBN 978-0950712222.
- Cunliffe, Barry (2005). Iron Age Communities in Britain (4th Ed). Routledge. ISBN 978-0415347792.
- Duffy, J. (2006). "Excavation of a Bronze Age wicker container, Gearraidh na h'Aibhne, Isle of Lewis" (PDF). Archaeology Data Service. Scottish Archaeological Internet Reports (SAIR).
- Fell, V. (1995). "Metallographic examination of Iron Age tools from Somerset". Historical Metallurgy. 29 (1): 1–11.
- Godwin, H. (1941). "Studies of the Post-Glacial History of British Vegetation VI. Correlations in the Somerset Levels". New Phytologist. 40 (2): 108–132. Bibcode:1941NewPh..40..108G. doi:10.1111/j.1469-8137.1941.tb07033.x.
- Hawkins, Desmond (1982). Avalon and Sedgemoor. Gloucester: Alan Sutton Publishing. ISBN 978-0-86299-016-9.
- Jay, Mandy (2008). "Iron Age Diet at Glastonbury Lake Village: The Isotopic Evidence for Negligible Aquatic Resource Consumption". Oxford Journal of Archaeology. 27 (2): 201–216. doi:10.1111/j.1468-0092.2008.00304.x.
- Minnitt, Stephen (2000). "12. The iron-age wetlands of central Somerset" (PDF). In Webster, C. J. (ed.). Somerset Archaeology. Somerset County Council. Archived from the original (PDF) on 4 July 2010.
- Minnitt, Stephen; Coles, John (2006). The Lake Villages of Somerset. Glastonbury Antiquarian Society. ISBN 978-0950712239.
- Tratman, E. K. (1970). "The Glastonbury Lake Village: A Reconsideration" (PDF). Proceedings of the University of Bristol Speleological Society. 12 (2): 143–167.
- Tuohy, Tina (2004). "Weaving as a Domestic Craft at the Iron Age Site of Glastonbury Lake Village in Somerset, Britain". Journal of Wetland Archaeology. 4 (1): 97–109. Bibcode:2004JWetA...4...97T. doi:10.1179/jwa.2004.4.1.97. S2CID 162326341.
- Webster, C.J. (2007). "The Somerset Lake Villages and wetland sites" (PDF). The Archaeology of South West England South West Archaeological Research Framework. Somerset County Council. p. 133. Archived from the original (PDF) on 4 March 2016.
- "Glastonbury Lake Village". Megalithic Portal.
