= Meare Lake Village =

- Location within Somerset
- 51°10′35″N 2°47′44″W
- Location: Meare, Somerset, England

History
- Built: Iron Age

Scheduled monument
- Reference no.: 194185

Meare Lake Village is the site of an Iron Age settlement on the Somerset Levels at Meare, Somerset, England. It is a Scheduled Ancient Monument.

== Description ==
In prehistoric times there were two villages situated within the now-drained Meare Pool, occupied at different times between 300 BC and 100 AD, similar to the nearby Glastonbury Lake Village. Investigation of the Meare Pool indicates that it was formed by the encroachment of raised peat bogs around it, particularly during the Subatlantic climatic period (1st millennium BC), and core sampling demonstrates that it is filled with at least 2 metres (6.6 ft) of detritus mud. The pool at that time was at least 2 miles (3.2 km) long by 1 mile (1.6 km) wide.

The villages were built on a morass on an artificial foundation of timber filled with brushwood, bracken, rubble and clay. The two villages, east and west, within Meare Pool appear to originate from a collection of structures erected on the surface of the dried peat, such as tents, windbreaks and animal folds. There were 50 to 60 hut sites in each of the villages.

Clay was later spread over the peat, providing raised stands for occupation, industry, and movement, and in some areas, thicker clay spreads accommodated hearths built of clay or stone. More recent studies have shown that the villages were formed by laying dried clay over the Sphagnum Moss of the bog.

Little has been found of walls or roofing material, which has led to speculation that the huts were in fact tent-like structures, which may have only been occupied on a seasonal basis.

The lake villages in the area were connected by tracks such as the Sweet Track through the peat bog, and include the Honeygore, Abbotts Way, Bells, Bakers, Westhay, and Nidons trackways. The purpose of these structures was to enable easier travel between the settlements.

== Excavation ==
The Meare villages were discovered in 1895, but excavation did not start until 1908, with much of the early work being carried out by Arthur Bulleid and Harold Gray. In the 1970s, the Somerset Levels Project undertook further excavations of the western area and followed this up with exploration of the eastern area in the 1980s. A ground-penetrating radar survey was undertaken in 1998 by the Centre for Wetland Archaeology at the University of Hull , when coring was also undertaken by Exeter University.

Archaeologists uncovered several hearths in the buried ruins of one of the houses. They also found several lias stones lying around the fire, including one vertical stone which may have been a backrest. The archaeologists also found several artefacts, including cut pieces of red deer antlers, pieces of iron, the rim of a bronze bowl, a spiral finger ring made from bronze, and a decorated amber bead. Bone and antler weaving combs have been found in large numbers, suggesting that braid production may have been important.

The site was used during the Iron Age for glass working, specialising particularly in bead production, some of which are now in the National Museum of Wales.
