= Godney =

Village and civil parish in Somerset, England

Coordinates: 51.1807°N 2.7393°W

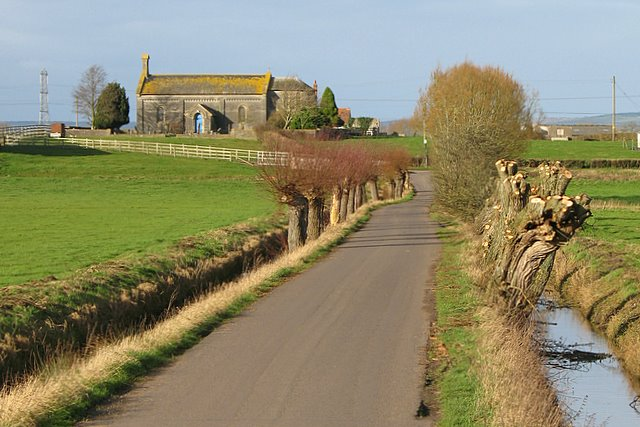
- Godney Church

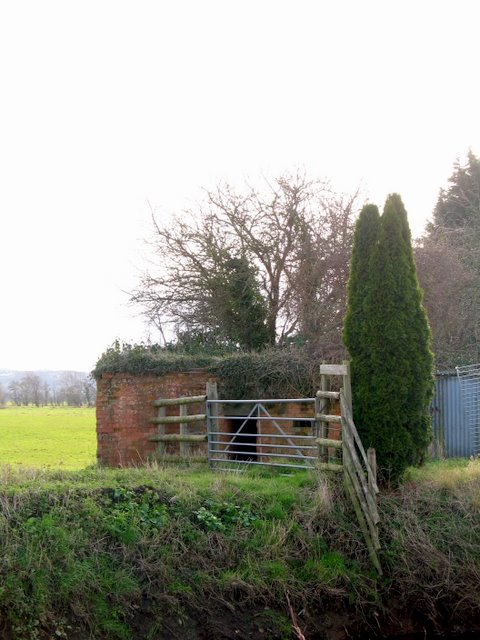
- Pill Box in Upper Godney

- Location within Somerset
- Population: 237 (2011)
- OS grid reference: ST485425
- Unitary authority: Somerset Council
- Ceremonial county: Somerset
- Region: South West
- Country: England
- Sovereign state: United Kingdom
- Post town: GLASTONBURY
- Postcode district: BA5
- Dialling code: 01458
- Police: Avon and Somerset
- Fire: Devon and Somerset
- Ambulance: South Western
- UK Parliament: Wells and Mendip Hills

Godney is a village and civil parish near Glastonbury on the River Sheppey on the Somerset Levels in the county of Somerset, England.

== History ==
Near the village are the sites of the Iron Age Glastonbury Lake Village, and the now drained Meare Pool.

During the Second World War, Godney was incorporated into the GHQ Line. Several pillboxes were constructed in the area. Natural obstacles to tanks were supplemented with an anti-tank ditch and bridges in the area were prepared for demolition at short notice.

== Governance ==
The parish council is responsible for local issues, including setting an annual precept (local rate) to cover the council's operating costs and producing annual accounts for public scrutiny. The parish council evaluates local planning applications but has no decision-making powers over planning and works with the local police, district council officers, and neighbourhood watch groups on matters of crime, security, and traffic. The parish council's role also includes initiating projects for the maintenance and repair of parish facilities, as well as consulting with the district council on the maintenance, repair, and improvement of highways, drainage, footpaths, public transport, and street cleaning. Conservation matters (including trees and listed buildings) and environmental issues are also the responsibility of the council.

The village falls within Somerset Council having previously been part of the Non-metropolitan district of Mendip, which was formed on 1 April 1974 under the Local Government Act 1972, and before that part of Wells Rural District, which is responsible for local planning and building control, local roads, council housing, environmental health, markets and fairs, refuse collection and recycling, cemeteries and crematoria, leisure services, parks, tourism, education, social services, libraries, main roads, public transport, policing and fire services, trading standards, waste disposal, and strategic planning.

It is also part of the Wells and Mendip Hills County constituency and is represented in the House of Commons of the Parliament of the United Kingdom. It elects one member of parliament (MP) by the first past the post system of election.

== Geography ==
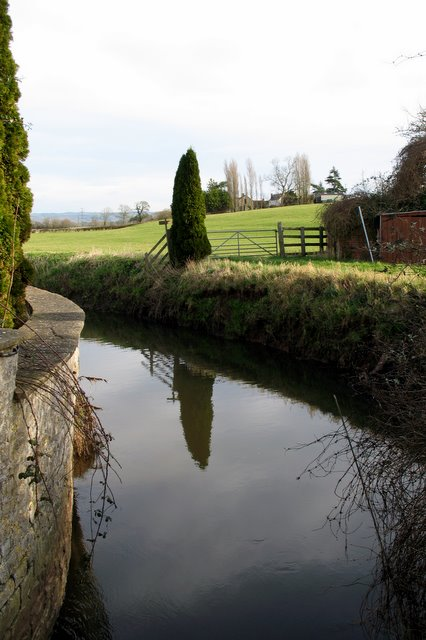
River Sheppey in Upper Godney, facing east.

To the north west of the village are the Westhay Moor and Somerset Levels National Nature Reserves. Westhay Moor is a biological Site of Special Scientific Interest and part of the Somerset Levels and Moors Special Protection Area under the EU Birds Directive and as a Ramsar site, and a national nature reserve. It is part of the Brue Valley Living Landscape conservation project.

Along with the rest of South West England, Godney has a temperate climate which is generally wetter and milder than the rest of the country. The annual mean temperature is approximately 10 °C (50.0 °F). Seasonal temperature variation is less extreme than most of the United Kingdom because of the adjacent sea temperatures. The summer months of July and August are the warmest with mean daily maxima of approximately 21 °C (69.8 °F). In winter mean minimum temperatures of 1 °C (33.8 °F) or 2 °C (35.6 °F) are common. In the summer the Azores high pressure affects the south-west of England, however convective cloud sometimes forms inland, reducing the number of hours of sunshine. Annual sunshine rates are slightly less than the regional average of 1,600 hours. In December 1998 there were 20 days without sun recorded at Yeovilton. Most of the rainfall in the south-west is caused by Atlantic depressions or by convection. Most of the rainfall in autumn and winter is caused by the Atlantic depressions, which is when they are most active. In summer, a large proportion of the rainfall is caused by sun heating the ground leading to convection and to showers and thunderstorms. Average rainfall is around 700 mm (28 in). About 8–15 days of snowfall is typical. November to March have the highest mean wind speeds, and June to August have the lightest winds. The predominant wind direction is from the south-west.

== Religious places ==
The Church of the Holy Trinity, by G.D. Manners, dates from 1839 and was built on a medieval site. It was restored in 1903, with an added chancel, by E. Buckle. It is a Grade II listed building.
