= Tealham and Tadham Moors =

Protected area in Somerset, England

- Site of Special Scientific Interest
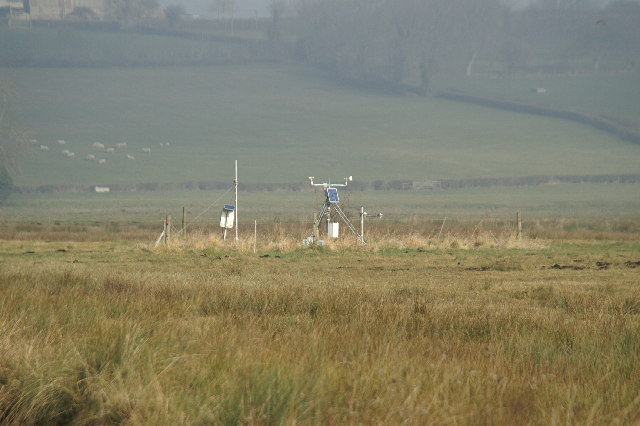

- Location within Somerset
- Location of Tealham and Tadham Moors.
- Area of search: Somerset
- Grid reference: ST420450
- Coordinates: 51.20125°N 2.83153°W
- Interest: Biological
- Area: 917.6 hectares (9.176 km^{2}; 3.543 sq mi)
- Notification date: 1985

Tealham and Tadham Moors (grid reference ST420450) is a 917.6 hectare (2267.3 acre) biological Site of Special Scientific Interest south of Wedmore in Somerset, notified in 1985.

Land south of this site is included in Catcott, Edington and Chilton Moors SSSI.

Tealham and Tadham Moors form part of the extensive grazing marsh and ditch systems of the Somerset Levels and Moors. The water table is high throughout the greater part of the year with winter flooding occurring annually, by over-topping of the River Brue. 113 aquatic and bankside vascular plant species have been recorded from the field ditches, rhynes and deep arterial watercourses. A diverse invertebrate fauna is associated in particular with ditches that have a good submerged plant community. The water beetle fauna is exceptionally rich, with the nationally rare species Hydrophilus piceus and Hydrochara caraboides together with the rare soldier flies Stratiomys furcata and Odontomyia ornata. Good numbers of dragonflies and damselflies occur including the Hairy Dragonfly (Brachytron pratense) and the Variable Damselfly (Coenagrion pulchellum).
