= Silver Beetle =

Silver Beetle could refer to:

- Hydrophilus piceus, known by the common name great silver water beetle
- Lesser silver water beetle
- a misspelling of "Silver Beatles", an older name for The Beatles
