= Shapwick Heath =

Nature reserve in Somerset, England

- Site of Special Scientific Interest
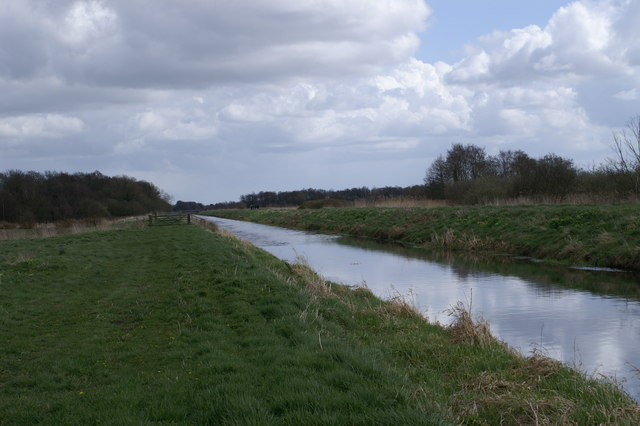

- Location within Somerset
- Location of Shapwick Heath.
- Area of search: Somerset
- Grid reference: ST430403
- Coordinates: 51.1591°N 2.8144°W
- Interest: Biological
- Area: 394 hectares (3.94 km^{2}; 1.52 sq mi)
- Notification date: 1967

Shapwick Heath is a 394.0-hectare (973.6 acre) biological Site of Special Scientific Interest and national nature reserve between Shapwick and Westhay in Somerset, notified in 1967. It is part of the Brue Valley Living Landscape conservation project. The project commenced in January 2009 and aims to restore, recreate and reconnect habitat. It aims to ensure that wildlife is enhanced and capable of sustaining itself in the face of climate change while guaranteeing farmers and other landowners can continue to use their land profitably. It is one of an increasing number of landscape scale conservation projects in the UK.

Shapwick Heath, part of the Avalon Marshes in the Somerset Levels Wetlands, and managed as a national nature reserve by Natural England, is a former raised bog lying in the basin of the River Brue. The site supports a diverse community of terrestrial and aquatic invertebrates. National rarities are the Greater Silver Diving Beetle (Hydrophilus piceus) and the Lesser Silver Diving Beetle (Hydrochara caraboides) which is now confined nationally to the Brue Basin Peat Moors.

The Sweet Track, an ancient causeway crosses the site. It is one of the oldest engineered roads known and the oldest timber trackway discovered in Northern Europe.

The adjoining Shapwick Moor has been purchased by the Hawk and Owl Trust as a reserve. Ham Wall nature reserve is to the east.
