= River Pitt =

River in Somerset, England

River Pitt Piddy

Location
- Country: England
- State: Somerset
- District: South Somerset
- Cities: Shepton Montague, Pitcombe

Physical characteristics
- Source
  - location: Brewham, South Somerset, England
  - coordinates: 51°05′55″N 2°24′41″W
- Mouth: River Brue
  - location: Cole, South Somerset, Somerset, England
  - coordinates: 51°06′05″N 2°28′38″W
- Length: 5.5 mi (8.9 km)

The River Pitt, also known as the Piddy, is a short tributary of the River Brue in Somerset, England. It rises near Hardway in the parish of Brewham, and flows for 5.5 miles (8.9 km) through the parishes of Shepton Montague and Pitcombe to join the Brue at Cole.
