= Catcott, Edington and Chilton Moors =

Protected area in Somerset, England

- Site of Special Scientific Interest
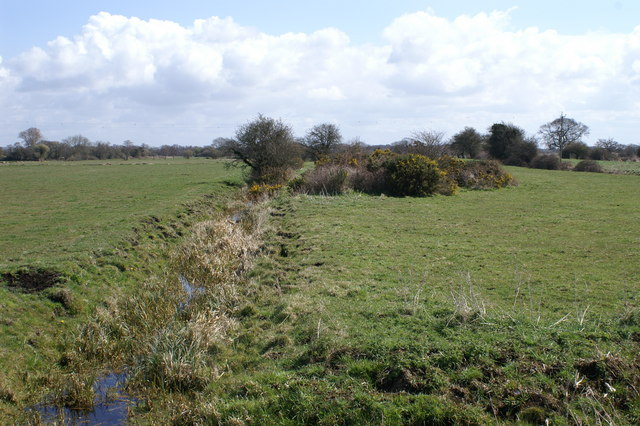
- Edington Heath

- Location within Somerset
- Location of Catcott, Edington and Chilton Moors.
- Area of search: Somerset
- Grid reference: ST390420
- Coordinates: 51.17397°N 2.87395°W
- Interest: Biological
- Area: 1,083 hectares (10.83 km^{2}; 4.18 sq mi)
- Notification date: 1967

Catcott, Edington and Chilton Moors SSSI is a 1083 hectare biological Site of Special Scientific Interest in Somerset, England notified in 1967. It is close to the villages of Edington and Catcott.

It is part of the Brue Valley Living Landscape conservation project. The project commenced in January 2009 and aims to restore, recreate and reconnect habitat. It aims to ensure that wildlife is enhanced and capable of sustaining itself in the face of climate change while guaranteeing farmers and other landowners can continue to use their land profitably. It is one of an increasing number of landscape scale conservation projects in the UK.

The site consists of low-lying land south of the River Brue, which floods on a regular basis; land north of here is included in the Tealham and Tadham Moors SSSI. The site is managed by Somerset Wildlife Trust and includes the Catcott Lows National Nature Reserve, Catcott Heath and Catcott North.

A variety of fauna are found due to the varied soil types and management practices. Unimproved swards include meadows dominated by meadow thistle (Cirsium dissectum), meadow rue (Thalictrum flavum) and similar species, and southern marsh-orchid (Dactylorhiza praetermissa). In the wetter areas rushes and marsh marigold (Caltha palustris) are found. Catcott Heath is noted for its rare vascular plants including marsh pea (Lathyrus palustris), milk-parsley (Peucedanum palustre) and marsh fern (Thelypteris palustris). A total of 127 aquatic and bankside vascular plant species have been recorded in the field ditches, internal drainage board maintained rhynes and deep arterial watercourses.

The botanically rich water channels support a diverse invertebrate fauna including water beetles Haliplus mucronatus and Hydrophilus piceus. The rare soldier fly, the flecked general (Stratiomys singularior), is found and there are good numbers of dragonflies and damselflies.

The range of plants and invertebrates support many bird species including golden plover (Pluvialis apricaria), lapwing (Vanellus vanellus), snipe (Gallinago gallinago) and dunlin (Calidris alpina). Other vertebrate species present, include the otter (Lutra lutra), grass snake (Natrix natrix) and common frog (Rana temporaria).
