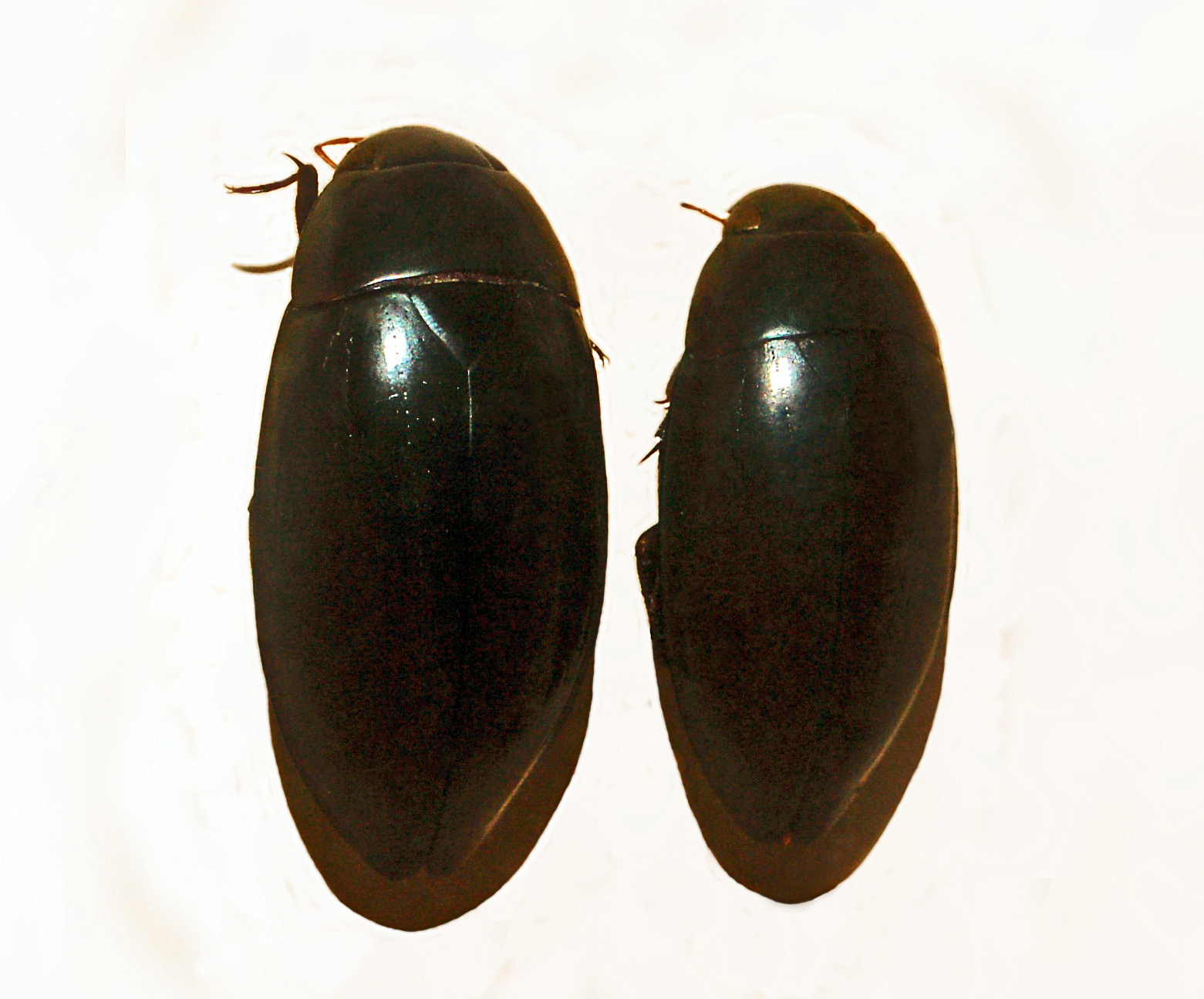
- Hydrophilus caschmirensis from India.

Scientific classification
- Kingdom: Animalia
- Phylum: Arthropoda
- Class: Insecta
- Order: Coleoptera
- Suborder: Polyphaga
- Infraorder: Staphyliniformia
- Family: Hydrophilidae
- Genus: Hydrophilus
- Species: H. caschmirensis

Binomial name
- Hydrophilus caschmirensis Redtenbacher, 1844

= Hydrophilus caschmirensis =

Species of beetle

Hydrophilus caschmirensis, common name large scavenging water beetle, is a species of water scavenger beetle belonging to the family Hydrophilidae.

== Description ==
Hydrophilus caschmirensis is dark brown or black. These beetles have streamlined bodies and heads adapted for aquatic life. The hindlegs are fringed with stiff hair useful in propelling this insect in the water. They gets oxygen from the air periodically visiting the surface. They feed on decaying vegetable matter.

== Distribution ==
This species can be found in India & Pakistan.
