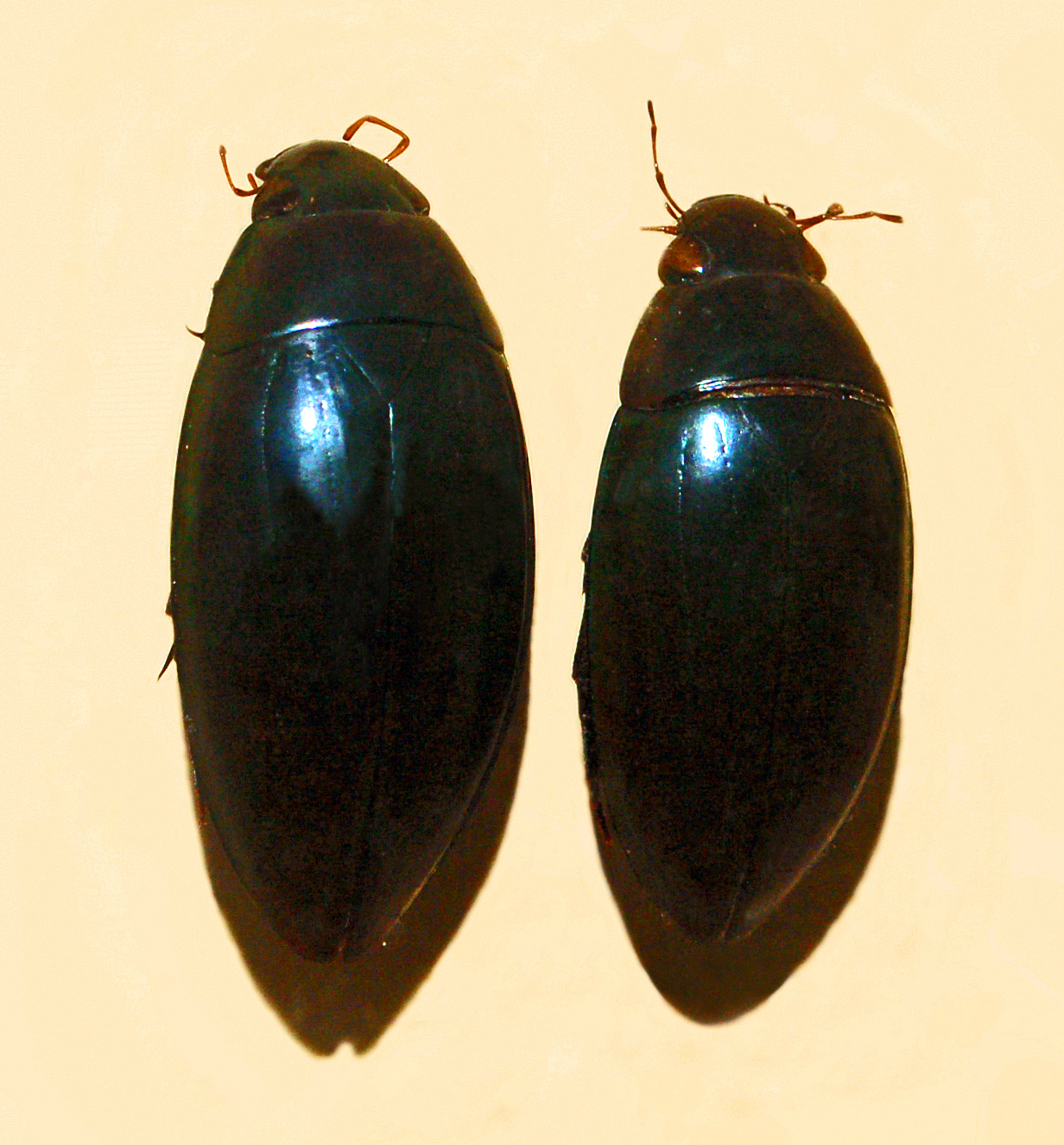
- Hydrophilus picicornis, from Java

Scientific classification
- Domain: Eukaryota
- Kingdom: Animalia
- Phylum: Arthropoda
- Class: Insecta
- Order: Coleoptera
- Suborder: Polyphaga
- Infraorder: Staphyliniformia
- Family: Hydrophilidae
- Genus: Hydrophilus
- Species: H. picicornis

Binomial name
- Hydrophilus picicornis Chevrolat, 1863

= Hydrophilus picicornis =

Species of beetle

Hydrophilus picicornis is a species of water scavenger beetle belonging to the Hydrophilinae subfamily. This species occurs mostly in Indonesia and Australia.
