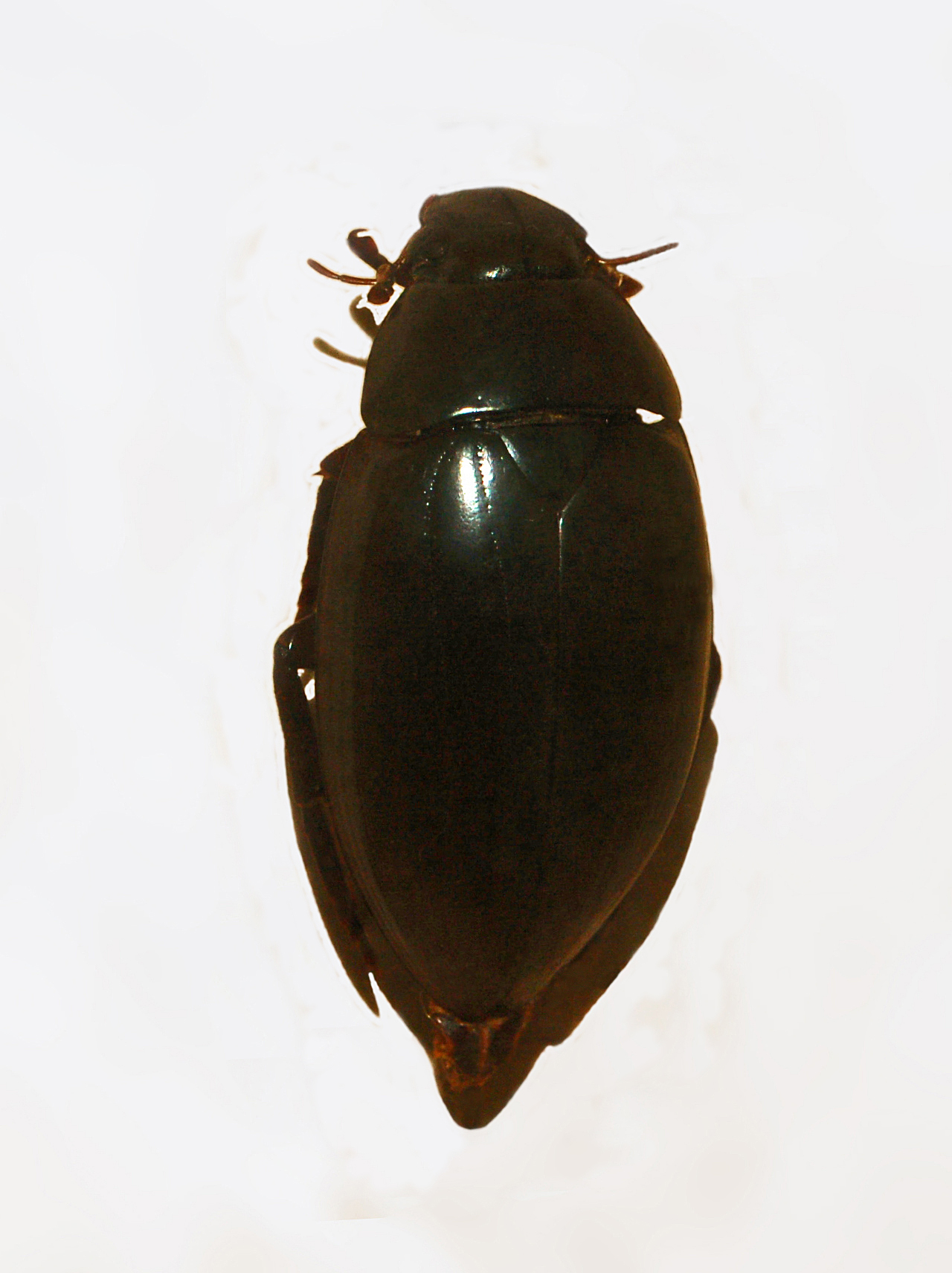
- Hydrophilus acuminatus from Japan

Scientific classification
- Domain: Eukaryota
- Kingdom: Animalia
- Phylum: Arthropoda
- Class: Insecta
- Order: Coleoptera
- Suborder: Polyphaga
- Infraorder: Staphyliniformia
- Family: Hydrophilidae
- Genus: Hydrophilus
- Species: H. acuminatus

Binomial name
- Hydrophilus acuminatus Motschulsky, 1853

= Hydrophilus acuminatus =

Species of beetle

Hydrophilus acuminatus, common name dark diving beetle, is a species of water scavenger beetles belonging to the family Hydrophilidae.

== Description ==
Hydrophilus acuminatus can reach a length of 33–42 millimetres (1.3–1.7 in). The basic color of the body is dark brown or black. These beetles have streamlined bodies and heads adapted for aquatic life, but they are not powerful swimmers. When they dive they carry a bubble of air under their elytra, while the body is covered by fine hairs trapping a layer of air. Adults are mainly vegetarian, feeding on aquatic plants, but larvae are carnivorous, feeding on tadpoles, snails and small fishes.

== Distribution ==
This species can be found in Russian Far East, China, Japan and Korea.
