= Beckery =

Area of Glastonbury, Somerset, England

Coordinates: 51.1485°N 2.7140°W

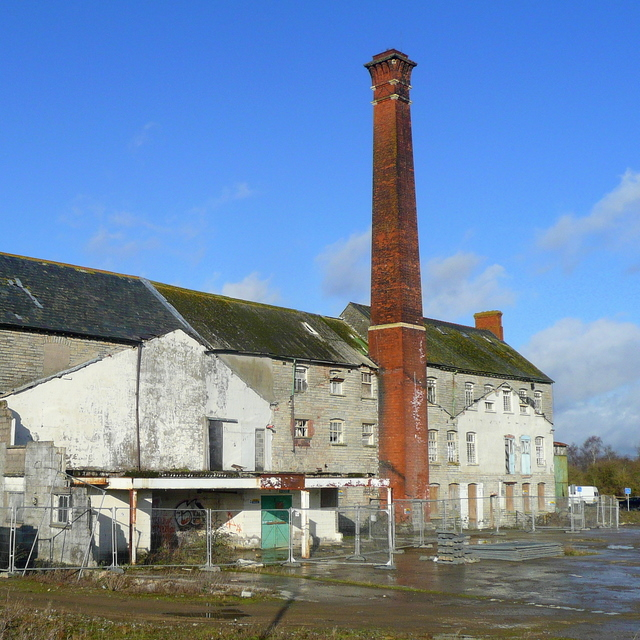
- Abandoned textile mill at Beckery

- Location within Somerset
- OS grid reference: ST4868638285
- Unitary authority: Somerset Council
- Ceremonial county: Somerset
- Region: South West
- Country: England
- Sovereign state: United Kingdom
- Post town: Glastonbury
- Postcode district: BA6
- Dialling code: 01458
- Police: Avon and Somerset
- Fire: Devon and Somerset
- Ambulance: South Western
- UK Parliament: Wells

Beckery (also Little Ireland) is an area within Glastonbury. It was once the main industrial area of the town. The area is said to have been visited by Saint Brigid of Kildare in the 4th or 5th century.

== Name ==
The name is recorded in a Charter by Henry II where it is registered as Bekeria quae Parva Hibernia dicitur or "Beckery, known as Little Ireland". There are further translations that include Beag Eire and Bec-Eriu, beag in the Irish Language meaning small and Éire meaning Ireland.

Other names for the area include Bride's Mound, Bride's Hay, Bride's Hill and Bridgid's Island.

== Irish colony ==
It is recorded that in the 10th century there was a local Irish colony at Beckery made up of monks fleeing to Britain to escape the Viking raids at Wexford in the 9th century. The colony could have possibly grown due to pilgrims coming from Ireland and first reaching the safety of Beckery, and then to the important site of pilgrimage in that of Glastonbury Abbey before carrying on their route toward Rome. Dunstan is said to have 'studied under the Irish monks who then occupied the ruins of Glastonbury Abbey.'

== Industrial area and revival ==
Beckery was once the main industrial area of Glastonbury and was home to Beckery Mill, which later became Baily's Tannery and Glove Factory. It was fed by a stream connected to the River Brue that also powered the Northover mill which was owned by Clarks, Son and Morland, who moved from their old site in Street to the area near to Beckery in 1870. The site in Northover was originally built while Richard Beere was the Abbot of Glastonbury (1493–1524), a medieval mill was built around 1517. After taking on the Grade II listed buildings in 1870 - It ceased trading in 1925.

== Links to St Brigid ==
Within the area of Beckery, there is a site known locally as St Brigid’s Chapel which was thought to represent a minor monastic site, possibly with a holy shrine known as an oratory.' Despite the chapel now lying in ruin, it is a popular destination for pilgrims and is used as an archaeological 'training site' which allows people to follow in the footsteps of the three well documented excavations that took place at the site over the last 150 years. John Morland first excavated the site in 1967 and documented two chapels - one built within the other.

During the 1967 excavation, this time by the archaeologist Philip Rahtz,'some 50 to 60 skeletons were found.' all of the skeletons are believed to have been related to the small monastery. Then in 2016 the chapel site was excavated once more where 'Carbon dating revealed the remains, discovered at Beckery Chapel, near Glastonbury, were from the 5th or early 6th Century AD. Site director Dr Richard Brunning said: "It's the earliest archaeological evidence we've got for monasticism."' The remains of a priest's house and cemetery were also noted and the site has been confirmed as 'the oldest monastery in the British Isles.'

William of Malmesbury documented her link to Beckery and wrote; ‘Hence the custom developed among the Irish of visiting that place to kiss the relics of their patron. Whence the well known story that Saint Indract and the Blessed Brigid, prominent citizens of that land, once frequented the place. They say that after Saint Brigid, who had come there in 488 AD, had tarried for some time on the island called Beokery [Beckery] she returned home but left behind certain of her ornaments, namely a bag, necklace, a small bell and weaving implements, which are still preserved in memory of her.’

John of Glastonbury also remarked that 'Saint Brigid made a stay of several years on an island near Glastonbury, called Bekery or Little Ireland, where there was an oratory consecrated in honour of Saint Mary Magdalene. She left there certain signs of her presence—her wallet, collar, bell, and weaving implements, which are exhibited and honoured there because of her holy memory—and she returned to Ireland, where, not much later, she rested in the Lord and was buried in the city of Down. The chapel on that island is now dedicated in honour of Saint Brigid; on its south side there is an opening through which, according to the belief of the common folk, anyone who passes will receive forgiveness of all his sins.'
