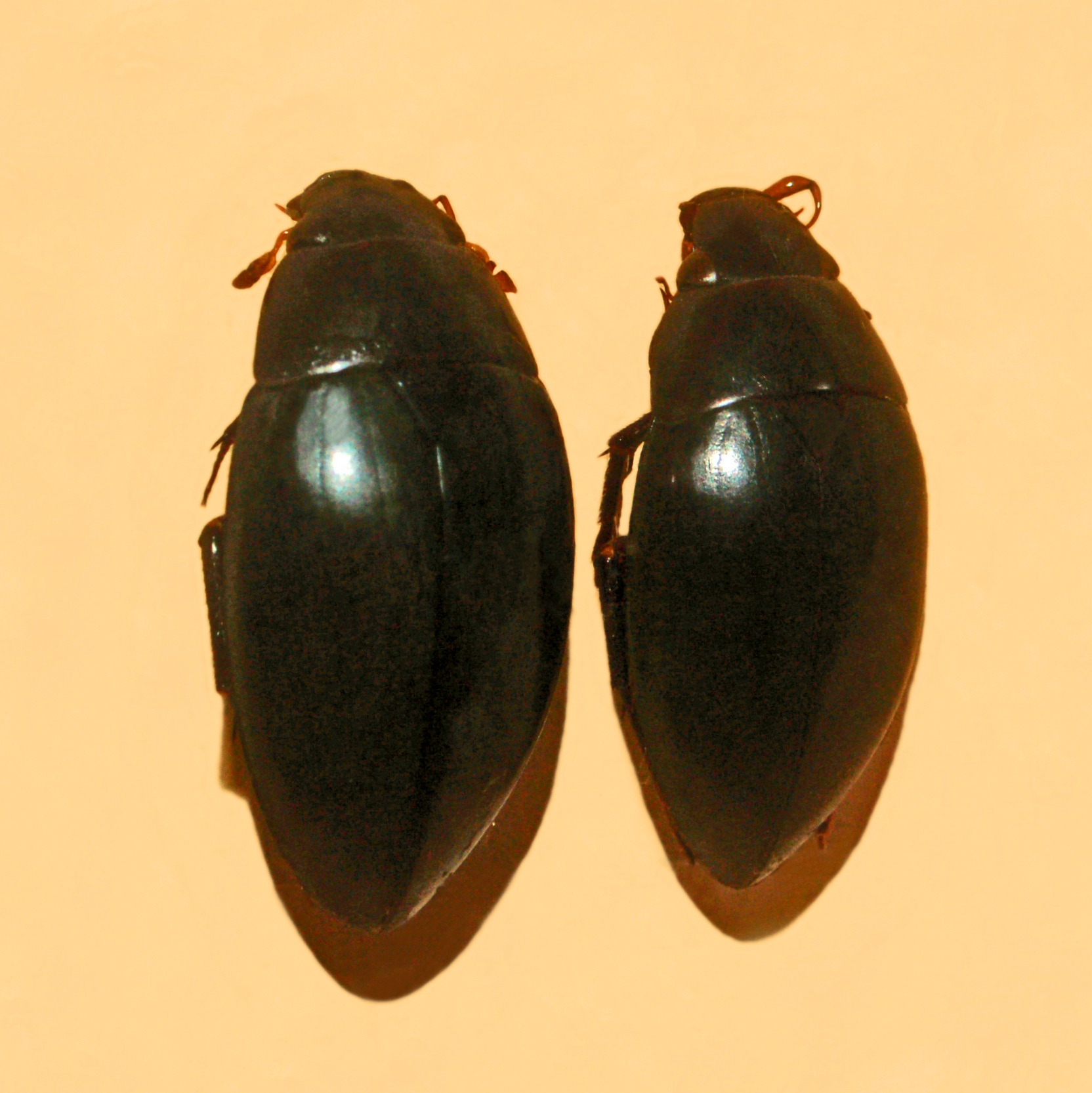
- Hydrophilus palpalis from Argentina

Scientific classification
- Kingdom: Animalia
- Phylum: Arthropoda
- Class: Insecta
- Order: Coleoptera
- Suborder: Polyphaga
- Infraorder: Staphyliniformia
- Family: Hydrophilidae
- Genus: Hydrophilus
- Subgenus: Dibolocelus
- Species: H. palpalis

Binomial name
- Hydrophilus palpalis Brullé, 1838

= Hydrophilus palpalis =

Species of beetle

Hydrophilus palpalis is a species of water scavenger beetles belonging to the Hydrophilinae subfamily.

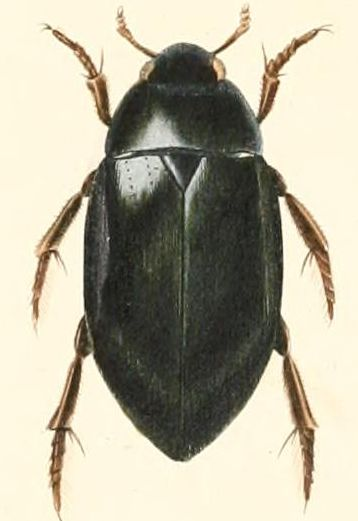
Hydrophilus palpalis. Illustration from Voyage dans l'Amérique Méridionale (1835) by Alcide d'Orbigny

Some authors have included this species in a distinct genus (Diboloceus), but most of them consider Diboloceus just a subgenus of Hydrophilus (Hydrophilus (Dibolocelus) palpalis).

== Description and behavior ==
This large species has an oval and moderately convex body. The basic color of the body is dark brown or black. Antennae are 9-segmented. Prosternum is well developed, divided into two lobes. Elytra show ten extremely fine striae. Hind femora are glabrous.

These beetles are adapted for aquatic life. The first-stage larvae and the adults are excellent swimmers. Adults are mainly vegetarian while the larvae are carnivorous and have a preference for molluscs.

== Distribution and habitat ==
This species can be found in South America in aquatic habitat, especially in rice cultivations (Oryza sativa).

== Bibliography ==
- Marcia Maria Dosciatti de Oliveira - Hydrophilus (Dibolocelus) palpalis Brullé, 1838 (Coleoptera, Hydrophilidae) – Ciclo vital y datos biogeográficos sobre las otras especies del subgênero
- Márcia M. D. de Oliveira; Cristiano Dalla-Rosa; Leonardo H. Matias; Juan A. R. Cueto Hydrophilus (Dibolocelus) palpalis (Coleoptera, Hydrophilidae, Hydrophilinae): description of the immature stages Iheringia, Sér. Zool. vol.94 no.4 Porto Alegre Dec. 2004
