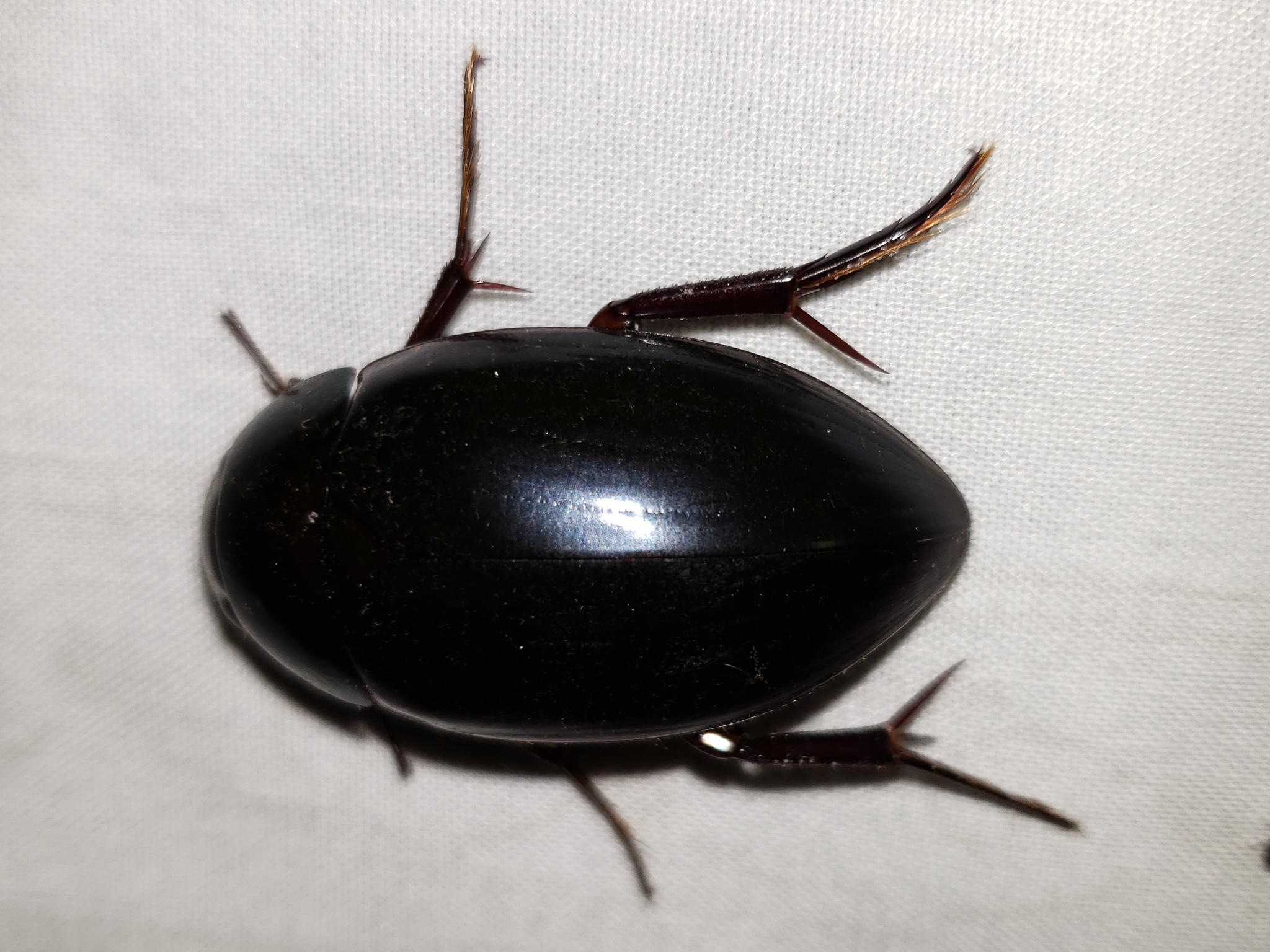

Scientific classification
- Domain: Eukaryota
- Kingdom: Animalia
- Phylum: Arthropoda
- Class: Insecta
- Order: Coleoptera
- Suborder: Polyphaga
- Infraorder: Staphyliniformia
- Family: Hydrophilidae
- Genus: Hydrophilus
- Subgenus: Dibolocelus
- Species: H. ovatus

Binomial name
- Hydrophilus ovatus Gemminger & Harold, 1868

= Hydrophilus ovatus =

Species of beetle

Hydrophilus ovatus is a species of water scavenger beetle in the family Hydrophilidae. It is found in the eastern United States from Maine south to Florida and west to Texas and Kansas, southern Ontario and Quebec, and south to southern Mexico.
