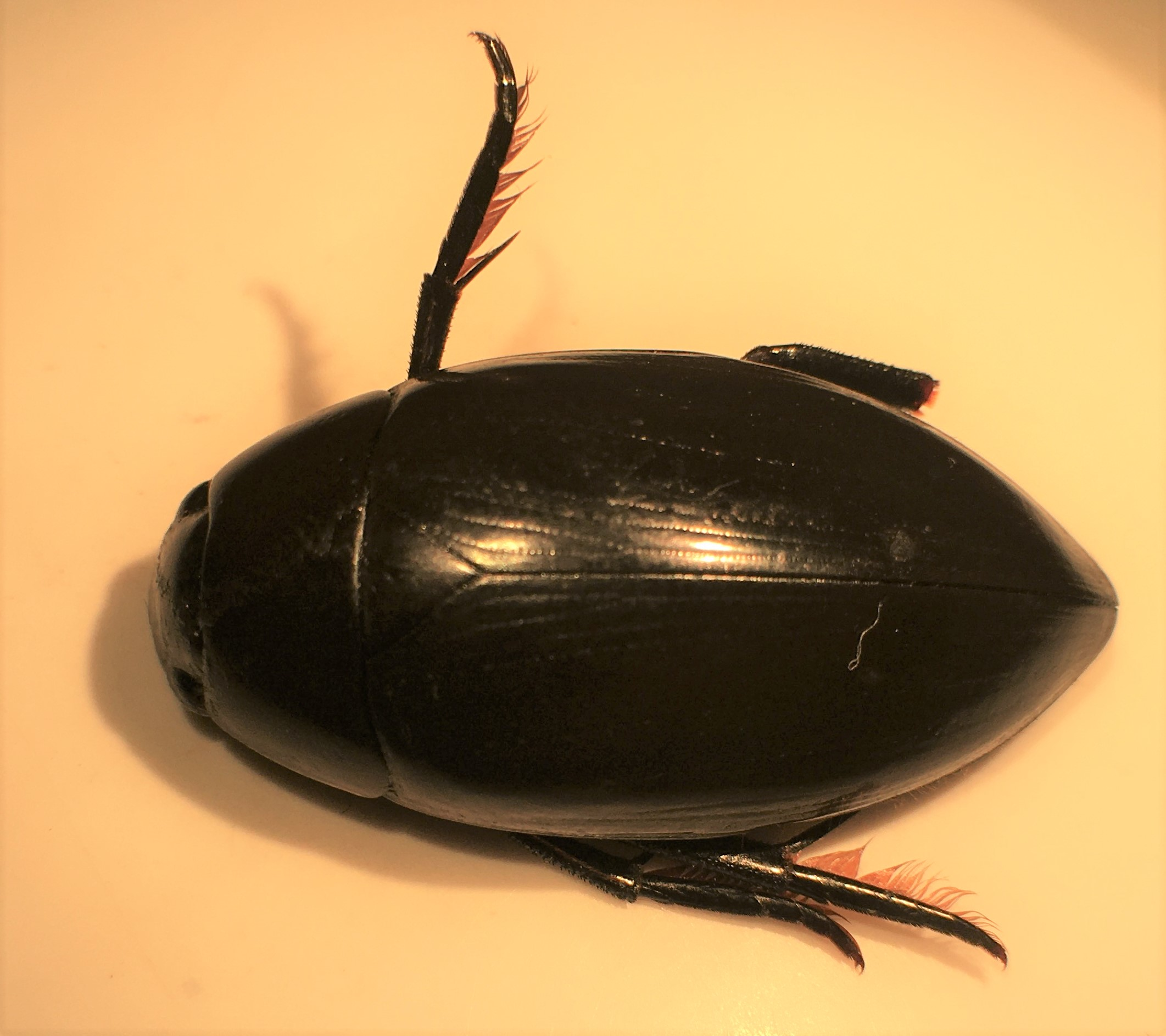

Scientific classification
- Domain: Eukaryota
- Kingdom: Animalia
- Phylum: Arthropoda
- Class: Insecta
- Order: Coleoptera
- Suborder: Polyphaga
- Infraorder: Staphyliniformia
- Family: Hydrophilidae
- Genus: Hydrophilus
- Species: H. insularis

Binomial name
- Hydrophilus insularis Laporte de Castelnau, 1840

= Hydrophilus insularis =

Species of beetle

Hydrophilus insularis is a species of water scavenger beetle in the family Hydrophilidae. It is found from northern South America north throughout the Caribbean, Central America, and Mexico into southern Arizona, California, Texas, and Florida in the United States.
