= Hydrochara rickseckeri =

Scientific classification
- Domain: Eukaryota
- Kingdom: Animalia
- Phylum: Arthropoda
- Class: Insecta
- Order: Coleoptera
- Suborder: Polyphaga
- Infraorder: Staphyliniformia
- Family: Hydrophilidae
- Genus: Hydrochara
- Species: H. rickseckeri

Binomial name
- Hydrochara rickseckeri Horn, 1895

Species of insects

Hydrochara rickseckeri, or Ricksecker's water scavenger beetle, is a rare species of beetle in the family Hydrophilidae. It is endemic to California.
