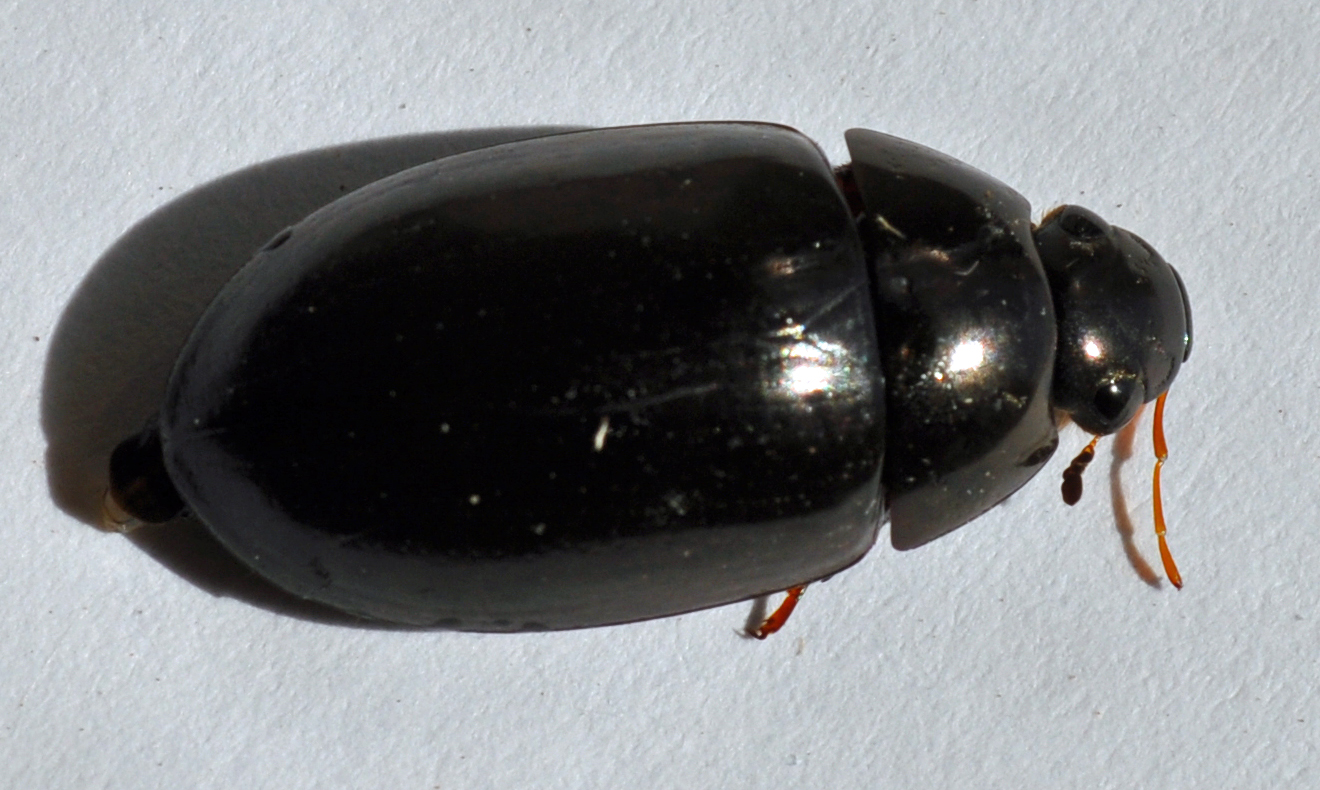

Scientific classification
- Domain: Eukaryota
- Kingdom: Animalia
- Phylum: Arthropoda
- Class: Insecta
- Order: Coleoptera
- Suborder: Polyphaga
- Infraorder: Staphyliniformia
- Family: Hydrophilidae
- Genus: Hydrochara
- Species: H. obtusata

Binomial name
- Hydrochara obtusata (Say, 1823)

= Hydrochara obtusata =

Species of beetle

Hydrochara obtusata is a species of water scavenger beetle in the family Hydrophilidae. It is found in North America.

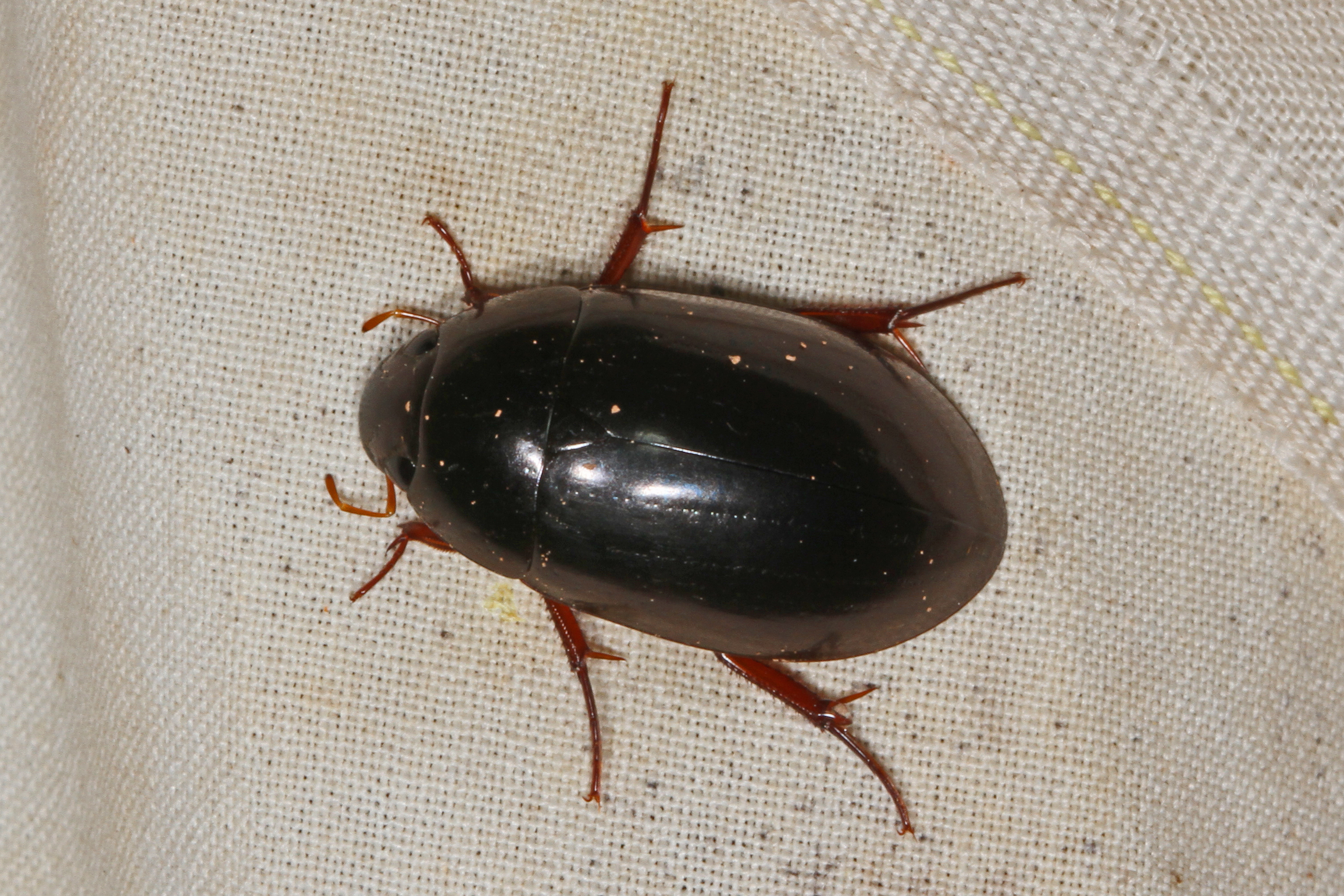
