= Brewham =

Civil parish in Somerset, England

Coordinates: 51.1261°N 2.4009°W

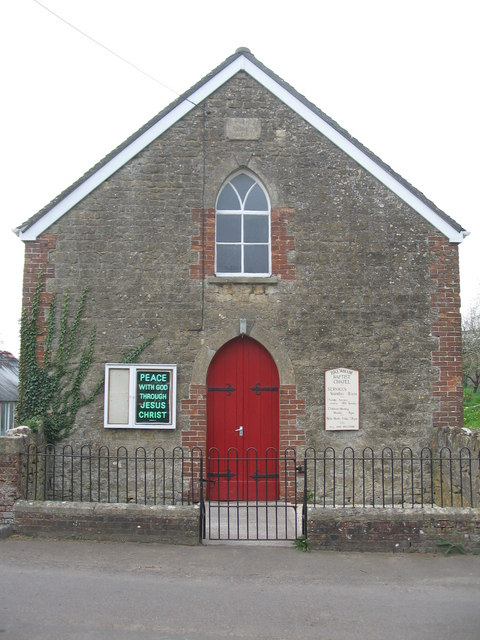
- Brewham Baptist Chapel

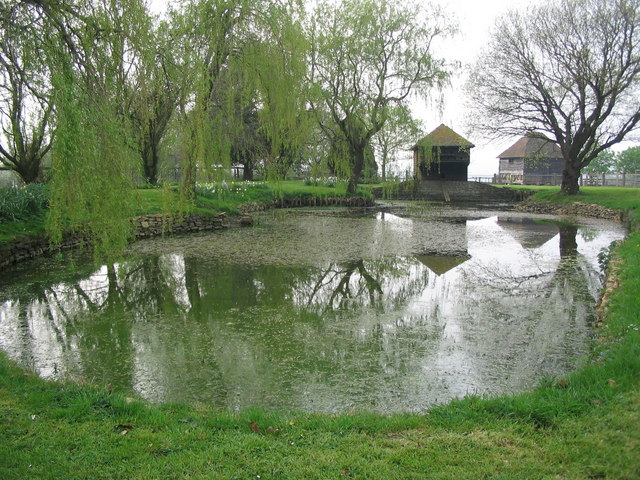
- Duckpond at South Brewham

- Location within Somerset
- Population: 441 (2011)
- OS grid reference: ST720364
- Unitary authority: Somerset Council
- Ceremonial county: Somerset
- Region: South West
- Country: England
- Sovereign state: United Kingdom
- Post town: Bruton
- Postcode district: BA10
- Dialling code: 01749
- Police: Avon and Somerset
- Fire: Devon and Somerset
- Ambulance: South Western
- UK Parliament: Glastonbury and Somerton

Brewham is a civil parish in Somerset, England, consisting of the villages of North Brewham and South Brewham, on either side of the river in the Brue Valley 3 miles (4.8 km) east of Bruton and 9 miles (14.5 km) south-west of Frome. The parish has a population of 441.

== History ==
The name of the villages comes from the settlement on the River Brue. In 1066 it was held by Robert son of Wimarc the Staller but after the Norman Conquest was given to William de Moyon is mentioned as a manor belonging to William de Moyon who gave it to his son, William de Mohun of Dunster. Later the manor was given to Bruton Abbey until the Dissolution of the Monasteries when it was granted to Sir Maurice Berkeley.

In 1251 Robert de Musgrove was granted a licence by the king to enlarge Brewham Park, which had previously been held by William de Montacute.

Brewham was part of the hundred of Bruton.

== Governance ==
The parish council has responsibility for local issues, including setting an annual precept (local rate) to cover the council's operating costs and producing annual accounts for public scrutiny. The parish council evaluates local planning applications and works with the local police, district council officers, and neighbourhood watch groups on matters of crime, security, and traffic. The parish council's role also includes initiating projects for the maintenance and repair of parish facilities, as well as consulting with the district council on the maintenance, repair, and improvement of highways, drainage, footpaths, public transport, and street cleaning. Conservation matters (including trees and listed buildings) and environmental issues are also the responsibility of the council.

For local government purposes, since 1 April 2023, the village comes under the unitary authority of Somerset Council. Prior to this, it was part of the non-metropolitan district of South Somerset, which was formed on 1 April 1974 under the Local Government Act 1972, having previously been part of Wincanton Rural District.

The village is part of 'Tower' electoral ward. This ward stretches to Shepton Montague and Cucklington avoiding Wincanton. The total population of the ward at the 2011 census was 2,442.

It is also part of Glastonbury and Somerton county constituency represented in the House of Commons of the Parliament of the United Kingdom. It elects one Member of Parliament (MP) by the first past the post system of election, and was part of the South West England constituency of the European Parliament prior to Britain leaving the European Union in January 2020, which elected seven MEPs using the d'Hondt method of party-list proportional representation.

== Geography ==
North Brewham Meadows is a biological Site of Special Scientific Interest because of the traditionally-managed species-rich meadows which support a neutral grassland community of the nationally rare common knapweed crested dog's-tail type. Breeding butterflies typical of unimproved neutral grassland include small copper (Lycaena phaeas), meadow brown (Maniola jurtina), grayling (Hipparchia semele) and ringlet (Aphantopus hyperantus).

== Landmarks ==
Within the parish and close to the border with Wiltshire is the 49 metres (161 ft) high King Alfred's Tower, a grade I listed building, designed in 1765 by Henry Flitcroft.

== Religious sites ==
The Church of Saint John the Baptist in South Brewham has 13th-century origins, but the current building is largely from the late 19th century.
