= Hydrochara simula =

Scientific classification
- Kingdom: Animalia
- Phylum: Arthropoda
- Class: Insecta
- Order: Coleoptera
- Suborder: Polyphaga
- Infraorder: Staphyliniformia
- Family: Hydrophilidae
- Genus: Hydrochara
- Species: H. simula

Binomial name
- Hydrochara simula Hilsenhoff & Tracy, 1982

Species of beetle

Hydrochara simula is a species of water scavenger beetle. It is found in the Great Lakes region of North America.
