= Shepton Montague Railway Cutting =

Protected area in Somerset, England

- Site of Special Scientific Interest
- Location within Somerset
- Location of Shepton Montague Railway Cutting.
- Area of search: Somerset
- Grid reference: ST686316
- Coordinates: 51.08285°N 2.44965°W
- Interest: Geological
- Area: 1.61 hectares (0.0161 km^{2}; 0.0062 sq mi)
- Notification date: 1992

Shepton Montague Railway Cutting (grid reference ST686316) is a 1.61 hectare geological Site of Special Scientific Interest at Shepton Montague in Somerset, notified in 1992.

It, which was part of the Somerset and Dorset Joint Railway, the section of Fuller's Earth Rock (Middle Jurassic) in England. The succession ranges from the upper part of the Lower Fuller's Earth Clay up to the Rugitela Beds.
