= North Brewham Meadows =

Protected area in Somerset, England

- Site of Special Scientific Interest
- Location within Somerset
- Location of North Brewham Meadows.
- Area of search: Somerset
- Grid reference: ST743379
- Coordinates: 51.13979°N 2.36873°W
- Interest: Biological
- Area: 8.9 hectares (0.089 km^{2}; 0.034 sq mi)
- Notification date: 1987

North Brewham Meadows (grid reference ST743379) is an 8.9 hectare (21.9 acre) biological Site of Special Scientific Interest at North Brewham in Somerset, England, notified in 1987.

These traditionally-managed species-rich meadows support a neutral grassland community of the nationally rare common knapweed crested dog's-tail type. Breeding butterflies typical of unimproved neutral grassland include small copper (Lycaena phaeas), meadow brown (Maniola jurtina), grayling (Hipparchia semele) and ringlet (Aphantopus hyperantus).
