= Hydrochara lineata =

Scientific classification
- Domain: Eukaryota
- Kingdom: Animalia
- Phylum: Arthropoda
- Class: Insecta
- Order: Coleoptera
- Suborder: Polyphaga
- Infraorder: Staphyliniformia
- Family: Hydrophilidae
- Genus: Hydrochara
- Species: H. lineata

Binomial name
- Hydrochara lineata (LeConte, 1855)

Species of beetle

Hydrochara lineata is a species of water scavenger beetle in the family Hydrophilidae. It is found in Central America and North America.
