= Hydrochara soror =

Scientific classification
- Domain: Eukaryota
- Kingdom: Animalia
- Phylum: Arthropoda
- Class: Insecta
- Order: Coleoptera
- Suborder: Polyphaga
- Infraorder: Staphyliniformia
- Family: Hydrophilidae
- Genus: Hydrochara
- Species: H. soror

Binomial name
- Hydrochara soror Smetana, 1980

Species of beetle

Hydrochara soror is a species of water scavenger beetle in the family Hydrophilidae. It is found in North America. The diet is composed mainly of other aquatic arthropods, though they've been known to consume plant matter as well. They're primarily nocturnal, but are sometimes active by day and do not hibernate.
