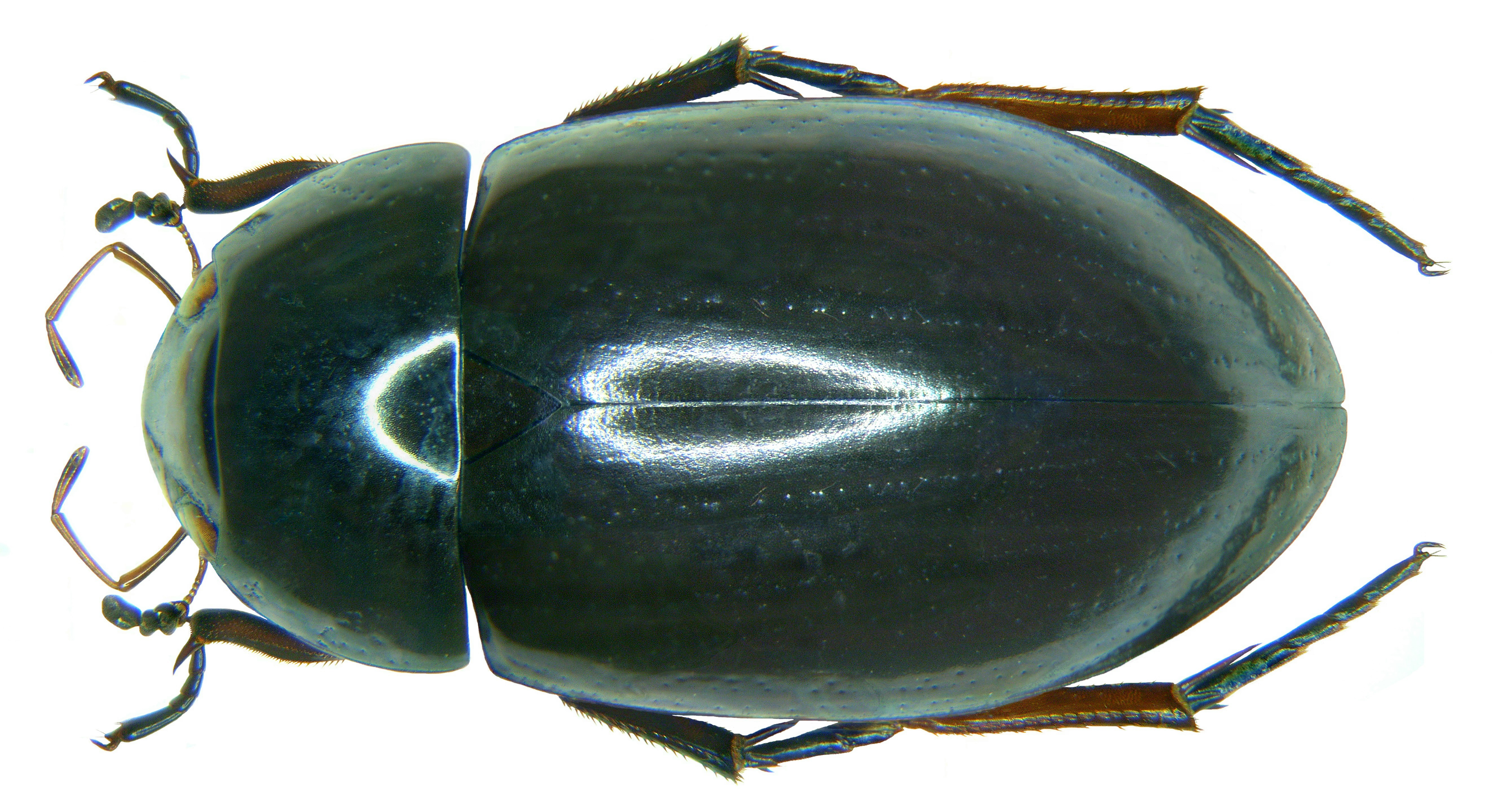
- Hydrochara caraboides

Scientific classification
- Domain: Eukaryota
- Kingdom: Animalia
- Phylum: Arthropoda
- Class: Insecta
- Order: Coleoptera
- Suborder: Polyphaga
- Infraorder: Staphyliniformia
- Family: Hydrophilidae
- Tribe: Hydrophilini
- Genus: Hydrochara; Berthold, 1827

Synonyms
- Hydrocharis Hope, 1838

= Hydrochara =

Genus of beetles

Hydrochara is a genus of hydrophilid beetles with 23 species in North America, Europe, Asia, and Africa.

== Species ==
- Hydrochara affinis (Sharp, 1873)
- Hydrochara brevipalpis Smetana, 1980
- Hydrochara caraboides (Linnaeus, 1758)
- Hydrochara cultrix Smetana, 1980
- Hydrochara dichroma (Fairmaire, 1829)
- Hydrochara elliptica (Fabricius, 1801)
- Hydrochara endroedyi Smetana, 1980
- Hydrochara flavipalpis (Boheman, 1851)
- Hydrochara flavipes (Steven, 1808)
- Hydrochara fulvofemorata (Fairmaire, 1869)
- Hydrochara leechi Smetana, 1980
- Hydrochara libera (Sharp, 1884)
- Hydrochara lineata (LeConte, 1855)
- Hydrochara obtusata (Say, 1823)
- Hydrochara occulta (Orchymont, 1933)
- Hydrochara rickseckeri (Horn, 1895)
- Hydrochara semenovi (Zaitzev, 1908)
- Hydrochara similis (Orchymont, 1919)
- Hydrochara simula Hilsenhoff & Tracy, 1982
- Hydrochara soror Smetana, 1980
- Hydrochara spangleri Smetana, 1980
- Hydrochara vicina Bameul, 1996
- Hydrochara vitalisi (Orchymont, 1919)
