= Shapwick Moor =

Area of farmland in Somerset, England

Coordinates: 51°08′N 2°49′W

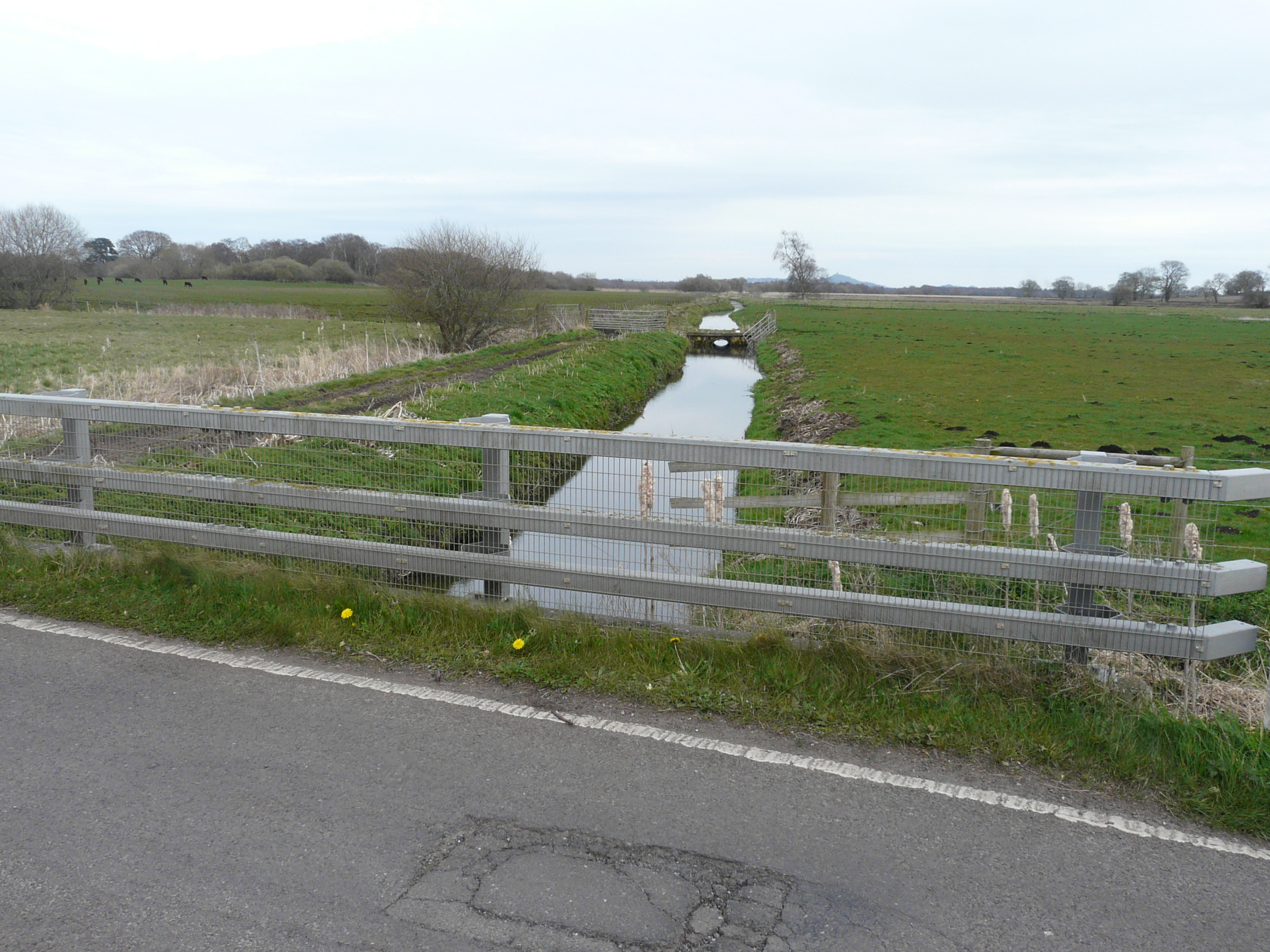
Looking east along Shapwick Moor Rhyne

Shapwick Moor is an area of 138 acres (0.56 km^{2}) of farmland on the Somerset levels bordering Shapwick Heath and Cattcot Heath.

It is part of the Brue Valley Living Landscape conservation project. The project commenced in January 2009 and aims to restore, recreate and reconnect habitat. It aims to ensure that wildlife is enhanced and capable of sustaining itself in the face of climate change while guaranteeing farmers and other landowners can continue to use their land profitably. It is one of an increasing number of landscape scale conservation projects in the UK.

It has been purchased by the Hawk and Owl Trust and will be their first reserve in south west England. The land will be farmed traditionally in order to recreate the habitats of the past.

The management plan for the site is being overseen by Natural England. The first steps in the creation of the nature reserve are to reseed the land and then reintroduce Devon ruby red cattle to the site. The priority is to encourage wildlife, not human visitors and there will be no visitor centre or permanent structures, but a public footpath which crosses the site will be improved and hides built along the footpath at key vantage points.

Birds identified at the site include: buzzard, sparrowhawk, kestrel, hobby, red kite, barn owl, lapwing, pheasant, cuckoo, woodpecker and skylark.
