= Hydrochara occulta =

Scientific classification
- Kingdom: Animalia
- Phylum: Arthropoda
- Class: Insecta
- Order: Coleoptera
- Suborder: Polyphaga
- Infraorder: Staphyliniformia
- Family: Hydrophilidae
- Genus: Hydrochara
- Species: H. occulta

Binomial name
- Hydrochara occulta (d'Orchymont, 1933)

Synonyms
- Hydrophilus occultus d'Orchymont, 1933

Species of beetle

Hydrochara occulta is a species of water scavenger beetle in the family Hydrophilidae. It is found in North America.
