= Hydrochara spangleri =

Scientific classification
- Domain: Eukaryota
- Kingdom: Animalia
- Phylum: Arthropoda
- Class: Insecta
- Order: Coleoptera
- Suborder: Polyphaga
- Infraorder: Staphyliniformia
- Family: Hydrophilidae
- Genus: Hydrochara
- Species: H. spangleri

Binomial name
- Hydrochara spangleri Smetana, 1980

Species of beetle

Hydrochara spangleri is a species of water scavenger beetle in the family Hydrophilidae. It is found in North America.
