= River Brue =

River in Somerset, England

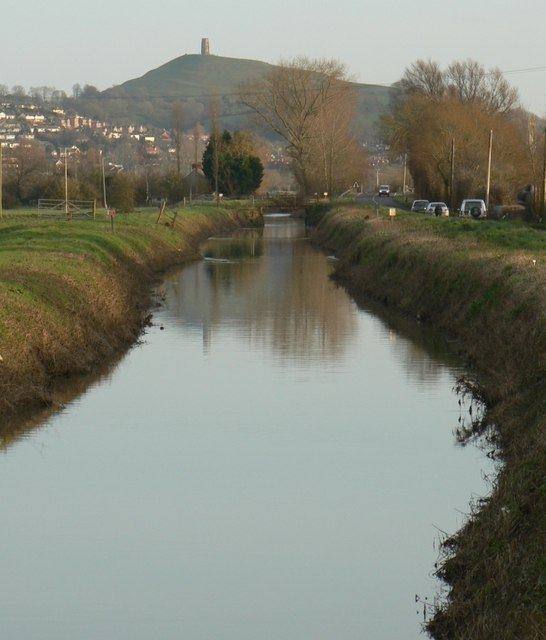
- River Brue and Glastonbury Tor

Location
- Country: England
- County: Somerset
- District: Somerset Levels
- Towns: Bruton, Glastonbury, Highbridge

Physical characteristics
- Source
  - location: Brewham, South Somerset, Somerset, England
  - coordinates: 51°07′49″N 2°22′43″W
- Mouth: Bristol Channel
  - location: Highbridge, Somerset, Somerset, England
  - coordinates: 51°13′32″N 3°00′13″W
- Length: 61 km (38 mi)

Basin features
- Tributaries
  - left: River Pitt
  - right: River Alham, Whitelake River

The River Brue originates in the parish of Brewham in Somerset, England, and reaches the sea some 50 kilometres (31 mi) west at Burnham-on-Sea. It originally took a different route from Glastonbury to the sea, but this was changed by Glastonbury Abbey in the twelfth century. The river provides an important drainage route for water from a low-lying area which is prone to flooding which man has tried to manage through rhynes, canals, artificial rivers and sluices for centuries.

The Brue Valley Living Landscape is an ecological conservation project based on the Somerset Levels and Moors and managed by the Somerset Wildlife Trust. The valley includes several Sites of Special Scientific Interest including Westhay Moor, Shapwick Heath and Shapwick Moor. Much of the area has been at the centre of peat extraction on the Somerset Levels. The Brue Valley Living Landscape project commenced in January 2009 to restore and reconnect habitat that will support wildlife. The aim is to be able to sustain itself in the face of climate change while guaranteeing farmers and other landowners can continue to use their land profitably. It is one of an increasing number of landscape scale conservation projects in the UK.

== Course ==
The River Brue originates in hills to the southwest of the catchment area, close to the border with Dorset. The same hills are the locale of the sources of the River Wylye and the Dorset Stour which flow south to the English Channel. It descends quickly in a narrow valley to a point just beyond Bruton where it is joined by the River Pitt. Here it takes a meandering route through a broad, flat-bottomed valley between Castle Cary and Alhampton. By the time it reaches Baltonsborough it is only some 10 metres (33 ft) above sea level and the surrounding countryside is drained into it by way of numerous rhynes. It passes Glastonbury, where it acts as a natural boundary with nearby village of Street, before flowing in a largely artificial channel across the Somerset Levels and into the River Parrett at Burnham-on-Sea. It is joined by the North Drain, White's River (which takes the water of the River Sheppey, Cripps River (an artificial channel that connects it to the River Huntspill) and many drainage rhynes). It is connect to the River Axe through several of these channels which are controlled by sluices. It is tidal below the sluices at New Clyce Bridge in Highbridge.

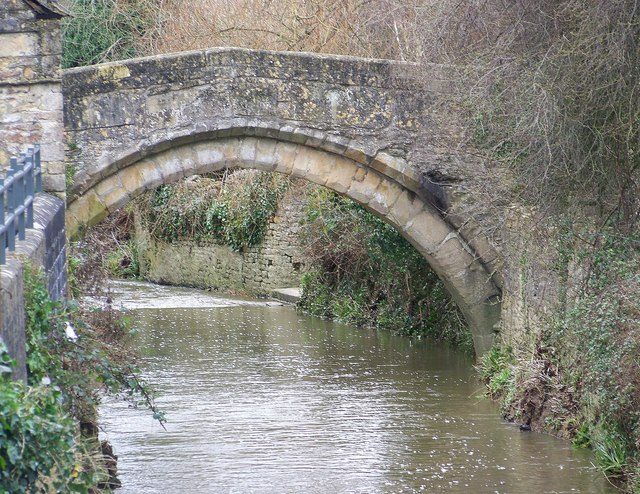
Bow Bridge

Bow Bridge is a 15th-century Packhorse bridge over the River Brue in Plox, Bruton. It is a Grade I listed building, and scheduled monument. The bridge may have been built as a link between the former Bruton Abbey, and its courthouse in the High Street. The bridge was restored after floods in 1982.

The River Brue has a long history of flooding. Its lower reaches are close to sea level, and the river above Bruton drains an area of 31 square kilometres (12 sq mi) into a steep and narrow valley. In 1984 a protective dam was built 1 kilometre (0.62 mi) upstream from the town.

The valley includes several Sites of Special Scientific Interest including Westhay Moor, Shapwick Heath and Shapwick Moor. Much of the area has been at the centre of peat extraction on the Somerset Levels. Large areas of peat were laid down on the Somerset Levels, particularly in the River Brue Valley, during the Quaternary period after the ice sheets melted. The extraction of peat from the Moors is known to have taken place during Roman times, and has been carried out since the Levels were first drained. Peat extraction on the Somerset Moors continues today, although much reduced.

== History ==
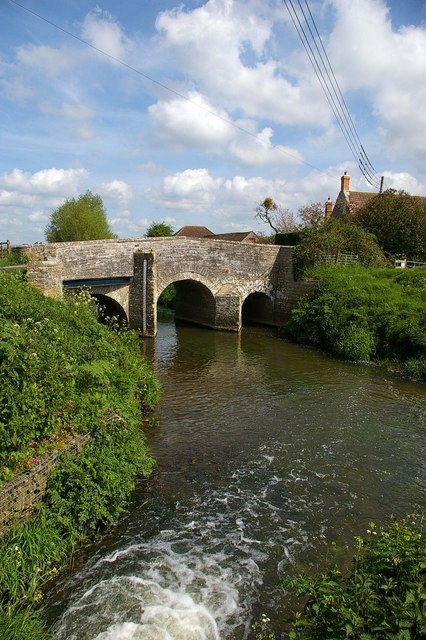
Tootal Bridge at Barton St David over the River Brue

The area is known to have been occupied since the Neolithic when people exploited the reedswamps for their natural resources and started to construct wooden trackways such as the Sweet and Post Tracks. The Sweet Track, named after the peat digger who discovered it in 1970 and dating from the 3800s BC, is the world's oldest timber trackway, once thought to be the world's oldest engineered roadway. The track was built between what was in the early 4th millennium BC an island at Westhay and a ridge of high ground at Shapwick, close to the River Brue. The remains of similar tracks have been uncovered nearby, connecting settlements on the peat bog including the Honeygore, Abbotts Way, Bells, Bakers, Westhay and Nidons trackways.

The Levels contain the best-preserved prehistoric village in the UK, Glastonbury Lake Village, as well as two others at Meare Lake Village. Discovered in 1892 by Arthur Bulleid, it was inhabited by about 200 people living in 14 roundhouses, and was built on a morass on an artificial foundation of timber filled with brushwood, bracken, rubble and clay.

The valley was used during Romano-British period when it was the site of salt extraction. At that time, the Brue formed a lake just south of the hilly ground on which Glastonbury stands. According to legend this lake is one of the locations suggested by Arthurian legend as the home of the Lady of the Lake. Pomparles Bridge stood at the western end of this lake, guarding Glastonbury from the south, and it is suggested that it was here that Sir Bedivere threw Excalibur into the waters after King Arthur fell at the Battle of Camlann. John Leland noted in the 16th century that the bridge had four arches, while W. Phelps in an 1839 illustration as having only two arches, one pointed, probably from the 14th or 15th century, and the other round. Excavations in 1912 found the remains of a second round arch regarded as 12th century work. The current concrete arch bridge was built in 1911 and extended in 1972. It carries the A39 road over the Brue.

=== Alteration of route ===
Before the 13th century the direct route to the sea at Highbridge was blocked by gravel banks and peat near Westhay. The course of the river partially encircled Glastonbury from the south, around the western side (through Beckery), and then north through the Panborough-Bleadney gap in the Wedmore-Wookey Hills, to join the River Axe just north of Bleadney. This route made it difficult for the officials of Glastonbury Abbey to transport produce from their outlying estates to the Abbey, and when the valley of the river Axe was in flood it backed up to flood Glastonbury itself. Sometime between 1230 and 1250 a new channel was constructed westwards into Meare Pool north of Meare, and further westwards to Mark Moor. It then divided into two channels, one the Pilrow cut flowing north through Mark to join the Axe near Edingworth, and the other directly west to the sea at Highbridge. During monastic times, there were several fish weirs along the lower reaches of the river. They used either nets or baskets, the fishing rights belonging to the Bishop of Bath and Wells and the Abbot of Glastonbury.

=== Drainage improvements ===
Somerset Drainage Act 1801
- Act of Parliament
- Parliament of the United Kingdom
- Long title: An Act for draining, preserving from Water, and improving certain Low Lands and Grounds, lying within the several Parishes or Chapelries of North Wooton, Pilton, West Pennard, Baltonsborough, Barton Saint Davids, Butleigh, Street, Glaston Saint John, Glaston Saint Benedict, Walton Ashcot, Shapwick, Moorlinch, Catcott, Chilton, Edington, Cossington, Woolavington, Huntspill, East Brent, South Brent, Mark, Wedmore, Meare, Burnam, Badgworth, Baddisham, Chapel Allerton, Were, Puriton, Pawlet, Wookey, and the Out Parish of Saint Cuthbert, in Wells, all in the County of Somerset.
- Citation: 41 Geo. 3. (U.K.) c. lxxii

Dates
- Royal assent: 20 June 1801

Text of statute as originally enacted

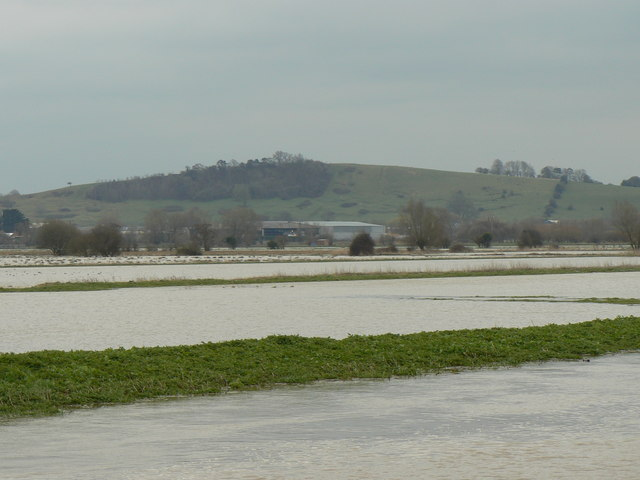
Flooded fields near Glastonbury in 2008

Between 1774 and 1797 a series of enclosures took place in the Brue valley between the Poldens and Wedmore. In 1794 the annual floods filled the whole of the Brue valley. Work by the Somerset Commissioners of Sewers led to the Somerset Drainage Act 1801 (41 Geo. 3. (U.K.) c. lxxii) which appointed the Brue Drainage Commissioners, and enabled sections at Highbridge and Cripp's Bridge to be straightened, and new feeder channels such as the North and South Drains to be constructed. In 1803 the clyse at Highbridge, which had been built before 1485, was replaced and moved further downstream.

The area around Bruton has suffered over the centuries. The earliest recorded damage was in 1768 when a stone bridge was destroyed after the river rose very rapidly. On 28 June 1917, 242.8 millimetres (9.56 in) of rain fell in 24 hours at Bruton, leaving a water mark on one pub 20 feet (6.1 m) above the normal level of the river. In 1982 extensive flooding occurred in the town, and as a result in 1984 a protective dam was built 1 kilometre (0.62 mi) upstream from the town.

=== 19th, 20th and 21st centuries ===
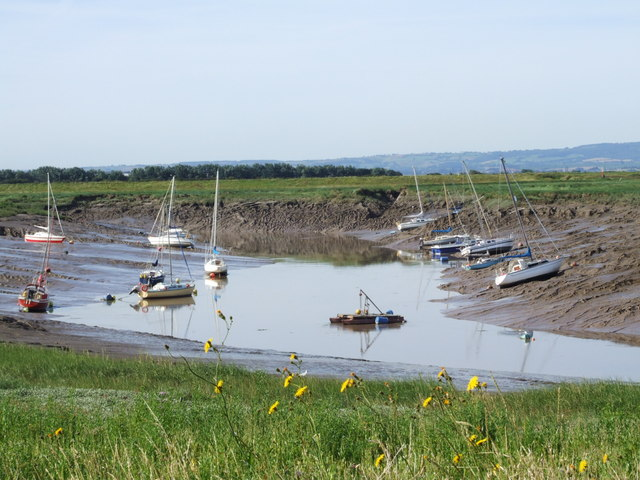
The mouth of the river

The mouth of the River Brue had an extensive harbour in Roman and Saxon times, before silting up in the medieval period. It was used again as a small harbour in the 17th and 18th centuries, and in 1833 the port of Highbridge was formally opened on the river. A new wharf, known as Clyce Wharf, was built on the Huntspill side of the river mouth by 1904, and was used for the import of coal and the export of bricks and tiles and agricultural products. The port closed in 1949.

Both Galton's Canal and Brown's Canal, which were built in the early 19th century, were connected to the river. The Glastonbury Canal used the course of the River Brue from Highbridge to Cripp's Bridge, and part of the South Drain to Ashcott Corner. The Glastonbury Canal ran for just over 14 miles (23 km) through two locks from Glastonbury to Highbridge, where it entered the River Parrett and from there the Bristol Channel. The canal was authorised by the Glastonbury Navigation and Canal Act 1827 (7 & 8 Geo. 4. c. xli) and opened in 1834. It was operated by the Glastonbury Navigation and Canal Company. Most of it was abandoned as a navigation in 1854, when a railway was built along the towpath.

During the Second World War the Brue was incorporated into GHQ Line and many pillboxes were constructed along the river. Gants Mill at Pitcombe, near Bruton, is a watermill which is still used to mill cattle feed. A 12 kilowatts (16 hp) hydroelectric turbine was recently installed at the site. There has been a mill here since the 13th century, but the current building was built in 1810.

Following summer floods of 1997 and the prolonged flooding of 1999–2000 the Parrett Catchment Project was formed, partly funded by the European Union Regional Development Fund, by 30 organisations, including British Waterways, Campaign to Protect Rural England, Countryside Agency, Department for Environment, Food and Rural Affairs, Environment Agency, Kings Sedgemoor and Cary Vale Internal Drainage Board (now part of Parrett Internal Drainage Board), Levels and Moors Partnership, National Farmers Union, Sedgemoor, Somerset County Council, South Somerset District Council, Taunton Deane and Wessex Water. They aim to tackle twelve areas, which, when combined, will make a significant contribution to reducing the adverse effects of flooding. These include the conversion of arable land, adoption of the Sustainable Drainage Systems (SuDS) approach to controlling rainwater runoff from developed areas, dredging, raising riverbanks and improving pumping facilities. Further studies of the possible beneficial effects of woodland in reducing flooding have also been undertaken.

During the winter flooding of 2013–14 on the Somerset Levels the River Brue overflowed at new year, during the rain and storms from Storm Dirk, with many residents asking for the Environment Agency to resume river dredging. On 24 January 2014, in light of the continued flooded extent of the Somerset Moors and forecast new rainfall as part of the winter storms of 2013–14 in the United Kingdom, both Somerset County Council and Sedgemoor District Council declared a major incident, as defined under the Civil Contingencies Act 2004. At this time, with 17,000 acres (6,900 ha) of agricultural land having been under water for over a month, the village of Thorney was abandoned and Muchelney was cut off by flood waters for almost a month. Northmoor Green, which is more commonly known as Moorland, was also severely affected. By the end of January, 17,000 acres (6,900 ha) of agricultural land, including North Moor, Curry and Hay Moors and Greylake, had been under water for over a month. Bridgwater was partly flooded on 10 February 2014, when with 20,000 sandbags ready to be deployed. Over 600 houses were flooded, and both flooding and groundwater disrupted services including trains on the Bristol to Exeter line between Bridgwater and Taunton. Further preventative work under the title of the "Brue Catchment River Maintenance Pilot Project" has led to controversy about the need for dredging and maintenance of the river.

== Hydrology and water quality ==
At Bruton Dam, the nearest measuring station to the source of the river, the normal level of the river is between 0.6 metres (2 ft 0 in) and 2.08 metres (6 ft 10 in) with the highest level ever recorded being 10.7 metres (35 ft) in 2007. Within the town of Bruton at Bruton Surgery the normal level is between 0.17 metres (6.7 in) and 0.69 metres (2 ft 3 in). Further downstream at Lovington the normal level is between 0.08 metres (3.1 in) and 0.56 metres (1 ft 10 in). The furthest downstream monitoring station at Clyse Hole near Street records a normal range of 0.15 metres (5.9 in) and 0.49 metres (1 ft 7 in).

For the purposes of monitoring of water quality the Brue and Axe are considered together. In 2013 19 water bodies within the area were considered to have moderate water quality with two being poor and four good quality. Agriculture and rural land management is the largest factor affecting water quality followed by the water industry. Transport, industry and manufacturing also have an effect.

== Ecology ==
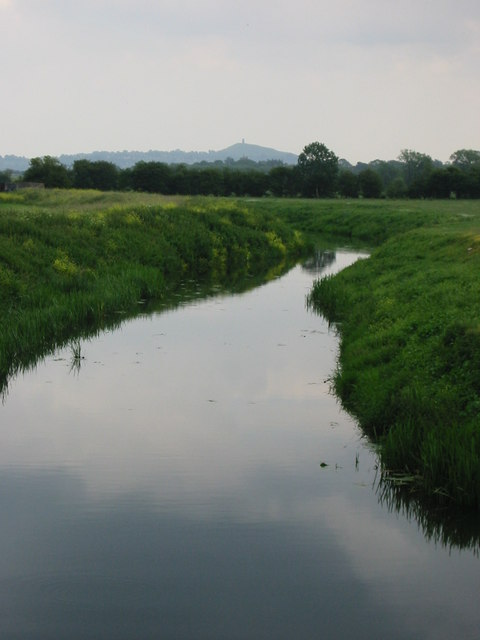
The River Brue crossing Westhay Moor

The Brue Valley Living Landscape is a UK conservation project managed by the Somerset Wildlife Trust. The project commenced in January 2009 and aims to restore habitat. It aims to help wildlife sustain itself in the face of climate change while guaranteeing farmers and other landowners can continue to use their land profitably. It is one of an increasing number of landscape scale conservation projects in the UK.

The project covers an area of approximately 12,500 hectares (31,000 acres) encompassing the floodplain of the River Brue from a little east of Glastonbury to beyond the Catcott, Edington and Chilton Moors SSSI in the west. Almost a quarter of the project area is designated as Site of Special Scientific Interest (SSSI), Special Protection Area (SPA) and Ramsar site. The project area accounts for almost half of the Somerset Levels and Moors Special Protection Area. The area includes land already managed for conservation by organisations including Somerset Wildlife Trust, Natural England, the Hawk and Owl Trust and the Royal Society for the Protection of Birds. These include Shapwick Heath national nature reserve, Westhay Moor, Catcott Lows National Nature Reserve, Ham Wall and Shapwick Moor. There are 25 scheduled monuments and 746 Historic Environment Records in the project area including internationally important sites such at the Glastonbury Lake Village and Sweet Track. Research on the Somerset Levels and Moors has been crucial to the understanding of the natural and human history of wetlands. The project is based solely on the peat-based soils of the Somerset Moors. It does not extend on to the marine clay soils of the more westerly Levels.

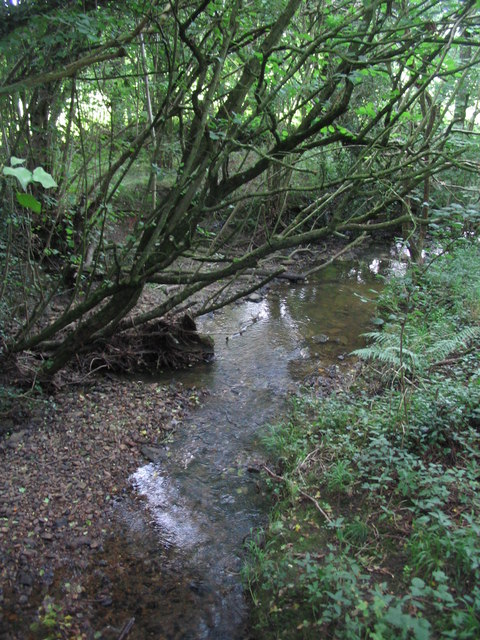
The headwaters of the river

The project has set out their major objectives. These include mapping and research on the Brue Valley, engagement with local government, farmers, the conservation sector and other interest community members, to produce a shared local vision. It is hoped to create larger and better connected patches of important habitats, in a way which also benefits the local economy and rural society. The project has received funding from the European Regional Development Fund (via the WAVE project), Natural England's Wetland Vision and the Viridor Credits scheme.

One of the project's goals is to protect, restore and create areas of reedbed, grazing marsh, fen, raised bog, lowland meadow, purple moor grass and rush pastures and wet woodland. Species of conservation concern (UK Biodiversity Action Plan priority species) that are likely to benefit from this project include plants such as: divided sedge (Carex divisa), English sticky eyebright (Euphrasia anglica), greater water parsnip (Sium latifolium), lesser butterfly orchid (Platanthera bifolia), marsh stitchwort (Stellaria palustris) and tubular water dropwort (Oenanthe fistulosa). The flora provides a habitat for several species of invertebrates. These include moths such as the argent and sable moth (Rheumaptera hastata) and narrow bordered bee hawk-moth (Hemaris tityus). While butterfly species include the small heath (Coenonympha pamphilus), pearl-bordered fritillary (Boloria euphrosyne) and small pearl-bordered fritillary (Boloria selene). Beetles found in the valley include the lesser silver water beetle (Hydrochara caraboides) and one-grooved diving beetle (Bidessus unistriatus). There are also shining ram's-horn snails (Segmentina nitida) and shrill carder bees (Bombus sylvarum).

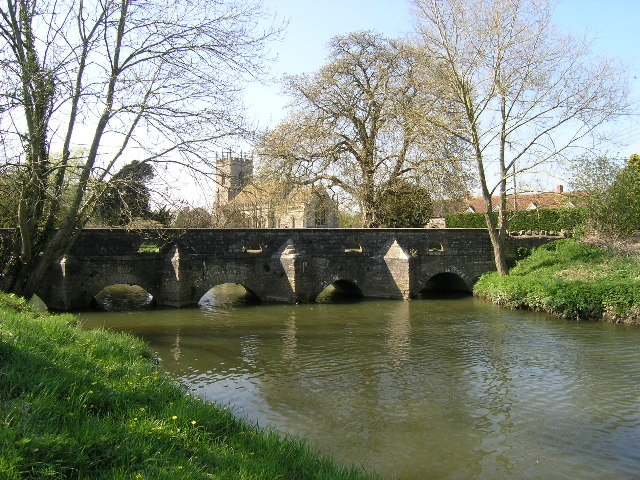
The river at West Lydford

The River Brue and its tributaries support a population of European eels (Anguilla anguilla). Reptiles found include the European adder (Vipera berus) and grass snake (Natrix natrix). Multiple bird species include Bewick's swan (Cygnus columbianus bewickii), Eurasian bittern (Botaurus stellaris), Eurasian bullfinch (Pyrrhula pyrrhula), *Eurasian wigeon (Anas penelope), European starling (Sturnus vulgaris), gadwall (Anas strepera), grasshopper warbler (Locustella naevia), hen harrier (Circus cyaneus), house sparrow (Passer domesticus), linnet (Carduelis cannabina), marsh harrier (Circus aeruginosus), marsh tit (Poecile palustris), merlin (Falco columbarius), northern lapwing (Vanellus vanellus), peregrine (Falco peregrinus), reed bunting (Emberiza schoeniclus), short-eared owl (Asio flammeus), skylark (Alauda arvensis), song thrush (Turdus philomelos), teal (Anas cracca), willow tit (Poecile montanus) and yellowhammer (Emberiza citrinella).

Mammalian species of interest include the brown hare (Lepus europaeus), Eurasian harvest mouse (Micromys minutus), European otter (Lutra lutra) and water vole (Arvicola terrestris).

== Recreation ==
Anglers will find pike in excess of 20 pounds (9.1 kg), with good stocks of chub, dace, roach, bream, tench, perch, rudd, and gudgeon. There are trout in the upper reaches. There are several access points along the river suitable for canoeing, and the river has been paddled as far up as Bruton, but above West Lydford only after recent rain. There are public footpaths alongside many stretches of the river. There are also areas of the river that serve as desirable spots for wild swimming.

== Rail access ==
Highbridge and Burnham railway station provides access. There is further 2 miles (3.2 km) walk or cycle westwards mainly alongside the River Brue, following the approximate flat path way of the former S&DJR extension route, takes the traveller into Burnham-on-Sea.
