= Hydrophilus ensifer =

Scientific classification
- Domain: Eukaryota
- Kingdom: Animalia
- Phylum: Arthropoda
- Class: Insecta
- Order: Coleoptera
- Suborder: Polyphaga
- Infraorder: Staphyliniformia
- Family: Hydrophilidae
- Genus: Hydrophilus
- Species: H. ensifer

Binomial name
- Hydrophilus ensifer Brullé, 1837

Synonyms
- Hydrophilus ater Olivier

Species of beetle

Hydrophilus ensifer is a species of water scavenger beetle in the family Hydrophilidae found in the Americas. As of 2020, there are two valid subspecies of H. ensifer, H. e. ensifer and H. e. duvali, however the differences among the subspecies are not well understood.

== Description ==
The genus Hydrophilus are among the largest aquatic insects. Adult H. ensifer typically reach lengths of 30–37 mm, although many are often less than 32 mm long.

== Distribution ==
Hydrophilus ensifer is found from Argentina northwards throughout most of South America, through Central America north into central Mexico, and throughout the Caribbean. Hydrophilus ensifer reaches as far north as South Florida in the United States.
