= Shepton Montague =

Village in Somerset, England

Coordinates: 51.0818°N 2.4653°W

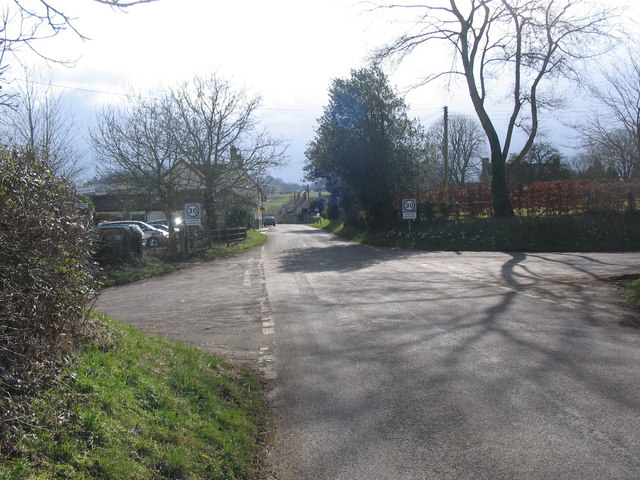

- Location within Somerset
- Population: 208 (2011)
- OS grid reference: ST675315
- Unitary authority: Somerset Council
- Ceremonial county: Somerset
- Region: South West
- Country: England
- Sovereign state: United Kingdom
- Post town: WINCANTON
- Postcode district: BA9
- Police: Avon and Somerset
- Fire: Devon and Somerset
- Ambulance: South Western
- UK Parliament: Glastonbury and Somerton

Shepton Montague is a village and civil parish in Somerset, England, United Kingdom. It is situated on the River Pitt midway between Wincanton, Bruton and Castle Cary.

It is known for its dairy farming and one of the country's main centres of organic farming.

== History ==
The first part of the name originates from Sheep Town. The second part comes from the family of the Anglo-Norman warrior Drew (Drogo) de Montagu, who held the manor from the Count of Mortain, from the Norman Conquest until the attainder in 1421 of his descendant Thomas Montagu, 4th Earl of Salisbury (1388-1428). The family's name (given in English variously as "Montagu, Montague, Montacute") was Latinised to de Monte Acuto, meaning "from the sharp mountain", a literal translation of the name of their Normandy manor of origin Montaigu, "sharp mountain" (now Montaigu-les-Bois, in the arrondissement of Coutances).

The parish of Shepton Montague was part of the Norton Ferris Hundred.

The manor was held from 1765 by the Phelips family of nearby Montacute House, in the parish of Montacute, Somerset, 4 miles (6.4 km) west of Yeovil, also named after the de Montagu family, but possibly from the conically-shaped St Michael's Hill dominating the village to the west.

Sergeant Daniel Bryant, a Royal Marine who was a part of Franklin's lost expedition, was born here in 1814.

== Governance ==
The parish council has responsibility for local issues, including setting an annual precept (local rate) to cover the council’s operating costs and producing annual accounts for public scrutiny. The parish council evaluates local planning applications and works with the local police, district council officers, and neighbourhood watch groups on matters of crime, security, and traffic. The parish council's role also includes initiating projects for the maintenance and repair of parish facilities, as well as consulting with the district council on the maintenance, repair, and improvement of highways, drainage, footpaths, public transport, and street cleaning. Conservation matters (including trees and listed buildings) and environmental issues are also the responsibility of the council.

For local government purposes, since 1 April 2023, the parish comes under the unitary authority of Somerset Council. Prior to this, it was part of the non-metropolitan district of South Somerset (established under the Local Government Act 1972). It was part of Wincanton Rural District before 1974.

It is also part of a county constituency represented in the House of Commons of the Parliament of the United Kingdom. It elects one Member of Parliament (MP) by the first past the post system of election.

== Geography ==
Shepton Montague Railway Cutting is a geological Site of Special Scientific Interest which exposes the most important known section of Fuller's Earth Rock (Middle Jurassic) in England.

== Religious sites ==
The parish Church of Saint Peter has 13th-century origins and has been designated as a Grade II listed building. It was seriously damaged by a fire in 1964 and restored two years later.

Alfred Edwin Eaton (1845–1929) was an English clergyman and entomologist who served as the vicar of Shepton Montague. His main interests among insects were the Diptera and Ephemeroptera.
