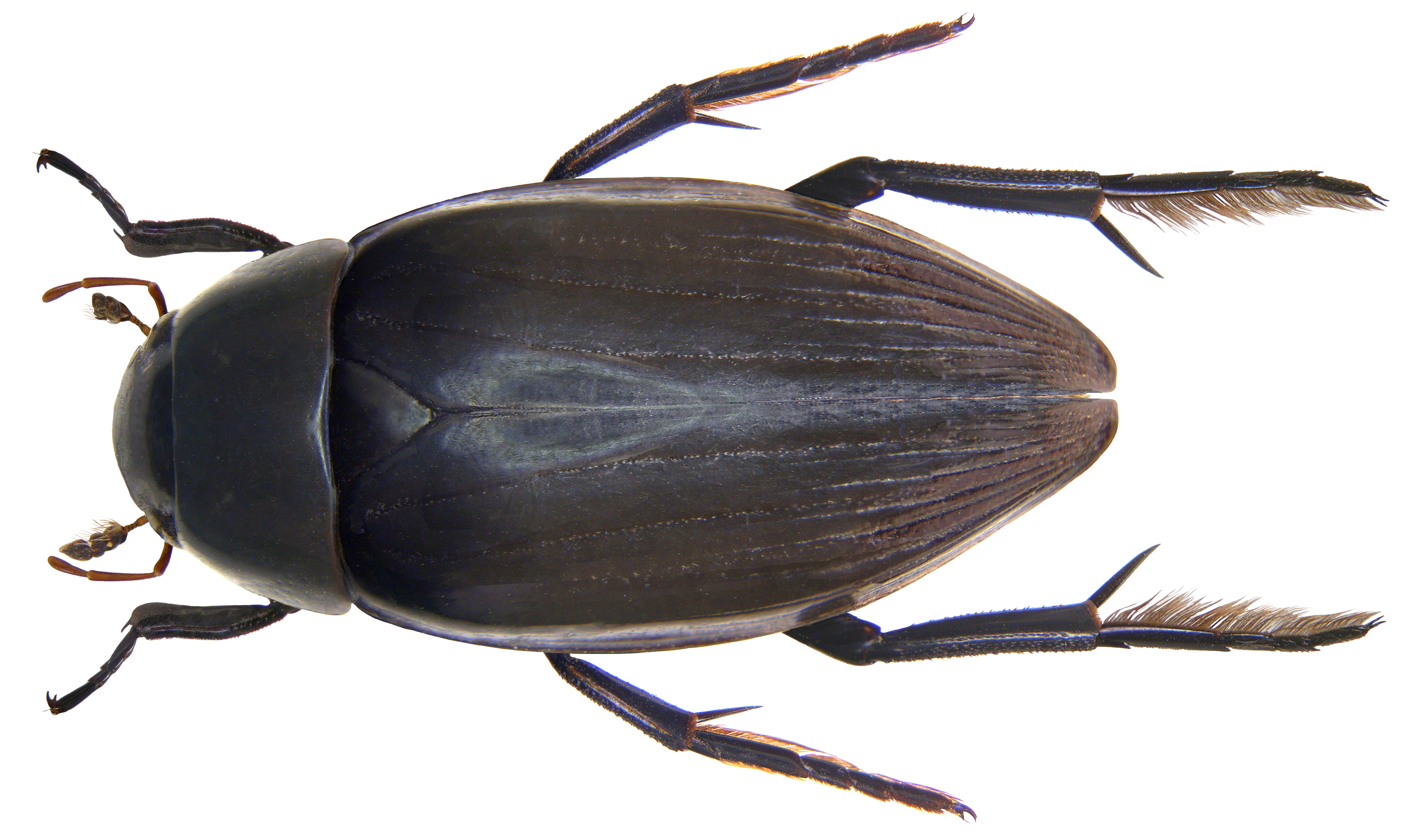
- Hydrophilus piceus

Scientific classification
- Domain: Eukaryota
- Kingdom: Animalia
- Phylum: Arthropoda
- Class: Insecta
- Order: Coleoptera
- Suborder: Polyphaga
- Infraorder: Staphyliniformia
- Family: Hydrophilidae
- Tribe: Hydrophilini
- Genus: Hydrophilus; Geoffroy, 1762

= Hydrophilus (beetle) =

Genus of beetles

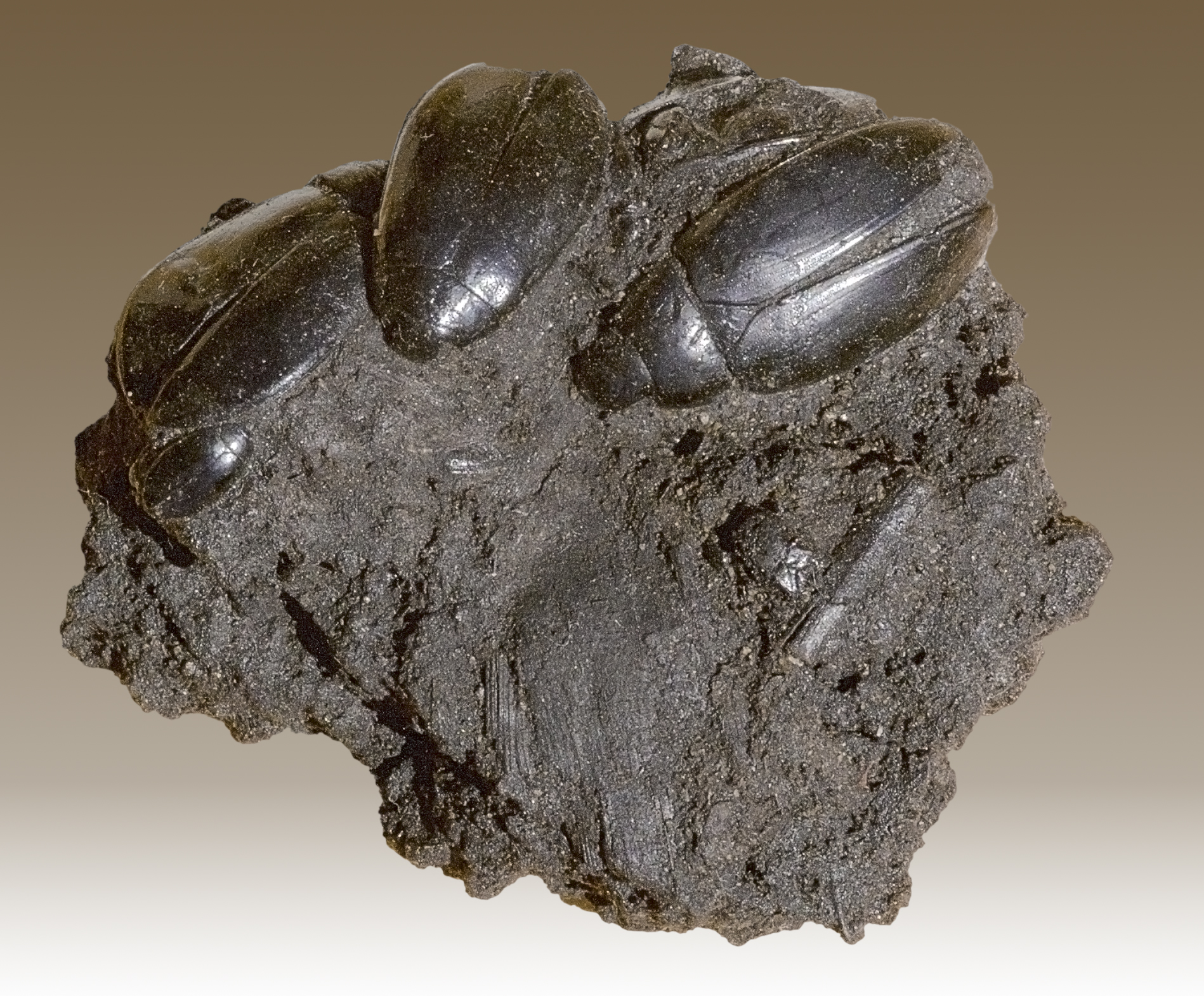
Hydrophilus sp. fossils

Hydrophilus is a genus of beetles in the family Hydrophilidae, the water scavenger beetles. There are 53 species in three subgenera in the genus: Hydrophilus, Dibolocelus, and Temnopterus.

== List of species ==
Subgenus Dibolocelus

- Hydrophilus gibbosus (Régimbart, 1901)
- Hydrophilus harpe Short and McIntosh, 2015
- Hydrophilus iricolor (Régimbart, 1901)
- Hydrophilus masculinus (Régimbart, 1901)
- Hydrophilus nucleoensis Arce-Pérez & Arriaga-Varela, 2021
- Hydrophilus oberthueri (Régimbart, 1901)
- Hydrophilus ovatus Gemminger and Harold 1868
- Hydrophilus palpalis Brullé, 1838
- Hydrophilus pollens Sharp, 1887
- Hydrophilus pseudovatus Arce-Pérez & Arriaga-Varela, 2021
- Hydrophilus purpuracens (Régimbart, 1901)
- Hydrophilus smaragdinus Brullé, 1837
- Hydrophilus violaceonitens Jacquelin du Val, 1857

Subgenus Hydrophilus

- Hydrophilus acuminatus Motschulsky, 1853
- Hydrophilus albipes Castelnau, 1840
- Hydrophilus aterrimus (Eschscholtz, 1822)
- Hydrophilus australis Montrouzier, 1860
- Hydrophilus bedeli (Régimbart, 1901)
- Hydrophilus bilineatus (MacLeay, 1825)
- Hydrophilus brevispina Fairmaire, 1879
- Hydrophilus cavicrus (Kuwert, 1893)
- Hydrophilus cavisternum (Bedel, 1891)
- Hydrophilus dauricus Mannerheim, 1852
- Hydrophilus ensifer Brullé, 1837
- Hydrophilus flavicornis Castelnau, 1840
- Hydrophilus foveolatus (Régimbart, 1901)
- Hydrophilus guarani (Bachmann, 1966)
- Hydrophilus hackeri (Orchymont, 1937)
- Hydrophilus hastatus (Herbst, 1779)
- Hydrophilus indicus (Bedel, 1891)
- Hydrophilus infrequens Watts, 1988
- Hydrophilus insularis Laporte de Castelnau, 1840
- Hydrophilus latipalpus Castelnau, 1840
- Hydrophilus loriai (Régimbart, 1901)
- Hydrophilus macronyx (Régimbart, 1901)
- Hydrophilus mesopotamiae (Kniz, 1914)
- Hydrophilus novaeguineae Watts, 1988
- Hydrophilus olivaceus Fabricius, 1781
- Hydrophilus pedipalpus (Bedel, 1891)
- Hydrophilus piceus (Linnaeus, 1758) – great silver water beetle
- Hydrophilus pistaceus Laporte de Castelnau, 1840
- Hydrophilus regimbarti (Zaitzev, 1908)
- Hydrophilus rufocinctus (Bedel, 1891)
- Hydrophilus senegalensis (Percheron, 1835)
- Hydrophilus simulator (Bedel, 1891)
- Hydrophilus sternitalis (Reitter, 1906)
- Hydrophilus temnopteroides (Orchymont, 1913)
- Hydrophilus triangularis Say, 1823 – giant water scavenger beetle
- Hydrophilus unguicularis (Régimbart, 1901)
- Hydrophilus wattsi Hansen, 1999

Subgenus Temnopterus

- Hydrophilus aculeatus (Solier, 1834)
- Hydrophilus rufomarginatus Hansen, 1999
