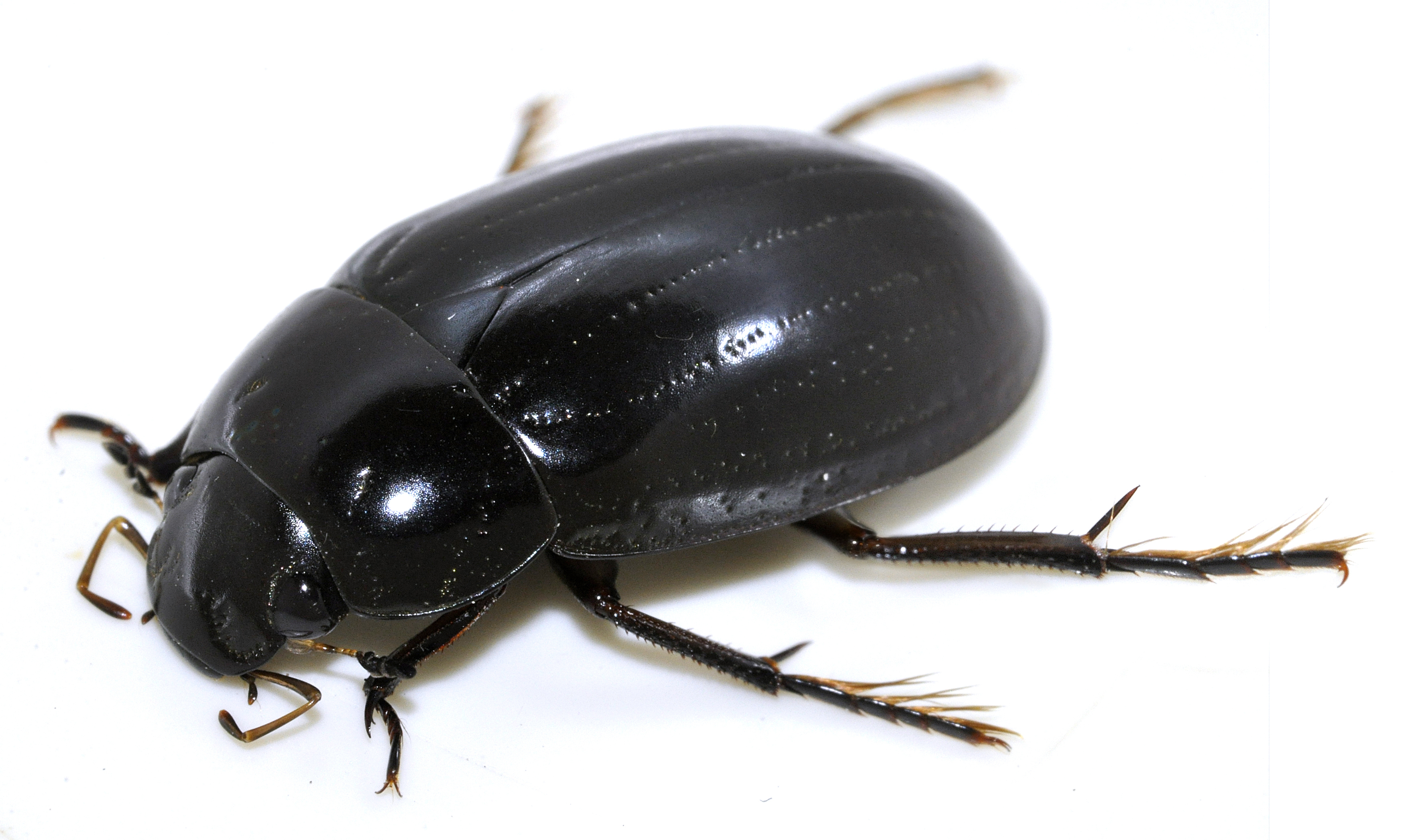

Scientific classification
- Kingdom: Animalia
- Phylum: Arthropoda
- Class: Insecta
- Order: Coleoptera
- Suborder: Polyphaga
- Infraorder: Staphyliniformia
- Family: Hydrophilidae
- Genus: Hydrochara
- Species: H. caraboides

Binomial name
- Hydrochara caraboides (Linnaeus, 1758)

= Lesser silver water beetle =

Species of beetle

The lesser silver water beetle (Hydrochara caraboides) is a species of water scavenger beetle (family Hydrophilidae).

== Description ==
The beetle is about 15 millimetres (0.6 in) long and, despite the name, is actually black in color. It traps air with the hairs on the underside of its body in order to breathe below water, and it is this silver looking bubble of air that gives the beetle its name.

== Distribution ==
H. caraboides has a wide distribution across Europe. In the United Kingdom, it is only found in the Somerset Levels, Cheshire and north-east Wales. It is classified as an endangered species, protected under Schedule 5 of the Wildlife and Countryside Act 1981.

The northern population cluster currently consists of around 45 breeding pools, several being ditches, most of which have a floating raft of densely matted vegetation at their centre, and an area of shallow open water containing isolated stands of emergent vegetation. The effect from cattle poaching is considered crucial for the beetle's ability to breed successfully at these water bodies.
