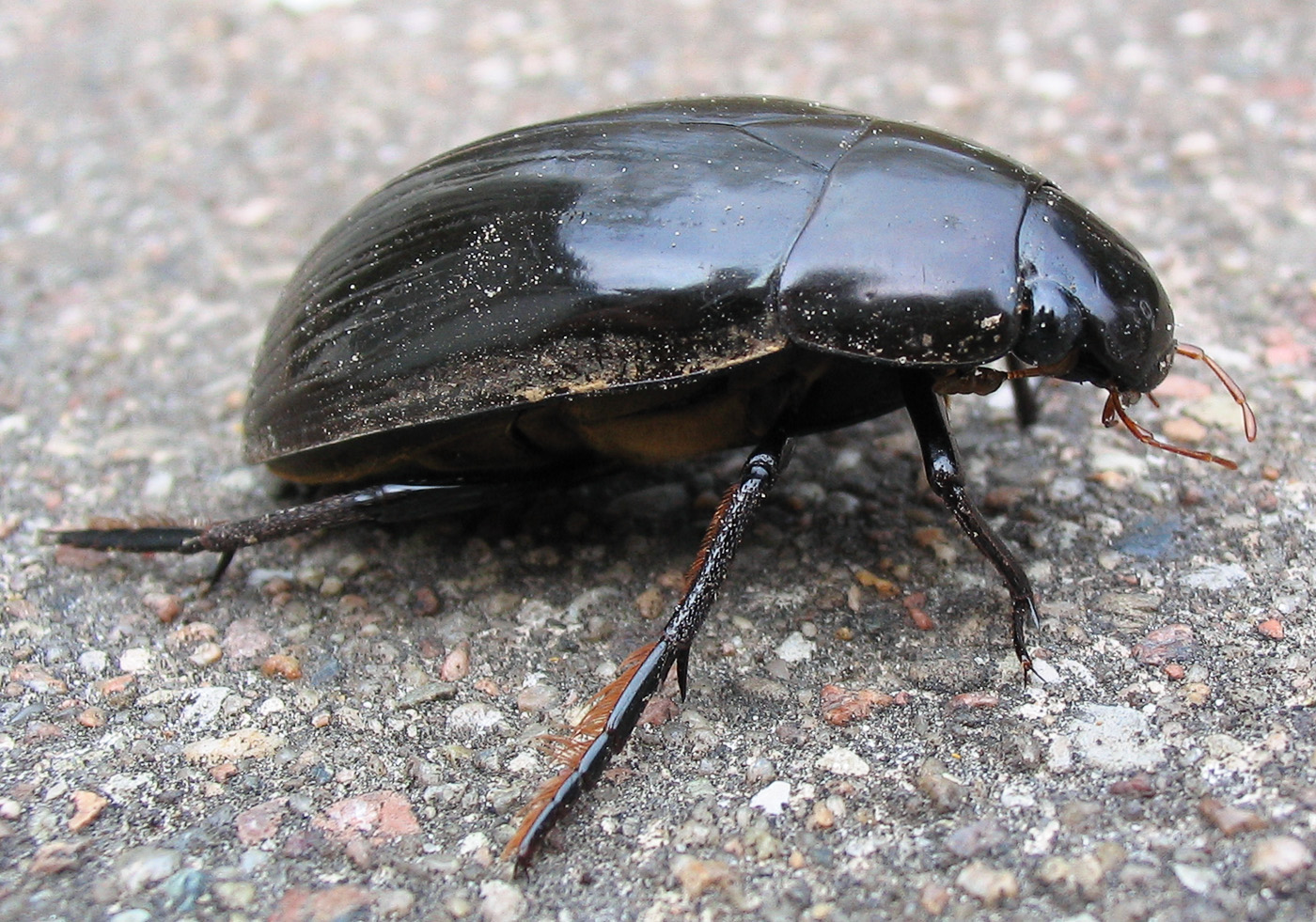

Scientific classification
- Kingdom: Animalia
- Phylum: Arthropoda
- Clade: Pancrustacea
- Class: Insecta
- Order: Coleoptera
- Suborder: Polyphaga
- Infraorder: Staphyliniformia
- Family: Hydrophilidae
- Genus: Hydrophilus
- Species: H. piceus

Binomial name
- Hydrophilus piceus (Linnaeus, 1758)

Synonyms
- List: Hydrophilus angustior Rey, 1885; Hydrophilus niger Eichler, 1876; Hydrophilus ruficornis De Geer, 1774; Hydrophilus viridicollis Redtenbacher, 1844; Hydrous piceus (Linnaeus, 1758); Hydrous turkestanus Kuwert, 1893; Stethoxus plicifer Bedel, 1891

= Hydrophilus piceus =

Species of beetle

Hydrophilus piceus is a species of beetles in the family Hydrophilidae, the water scavenger beetles. This very large aquatic beetle is found in the Palearctic and is known by the common name great silver water beetle.

== Description ==
This beetle is among the largest aquatic insects. Adults can reach up to 5–5.15 cm (1.97–2.03 in) in length and 2.05 cm (0.81 in) in width. The larvae are up to 7 cm (2.8 in) long. The body of adults is black with a greenish or olive sheen. It has protruding eyes and reddish-black antennae.

== Biology ==
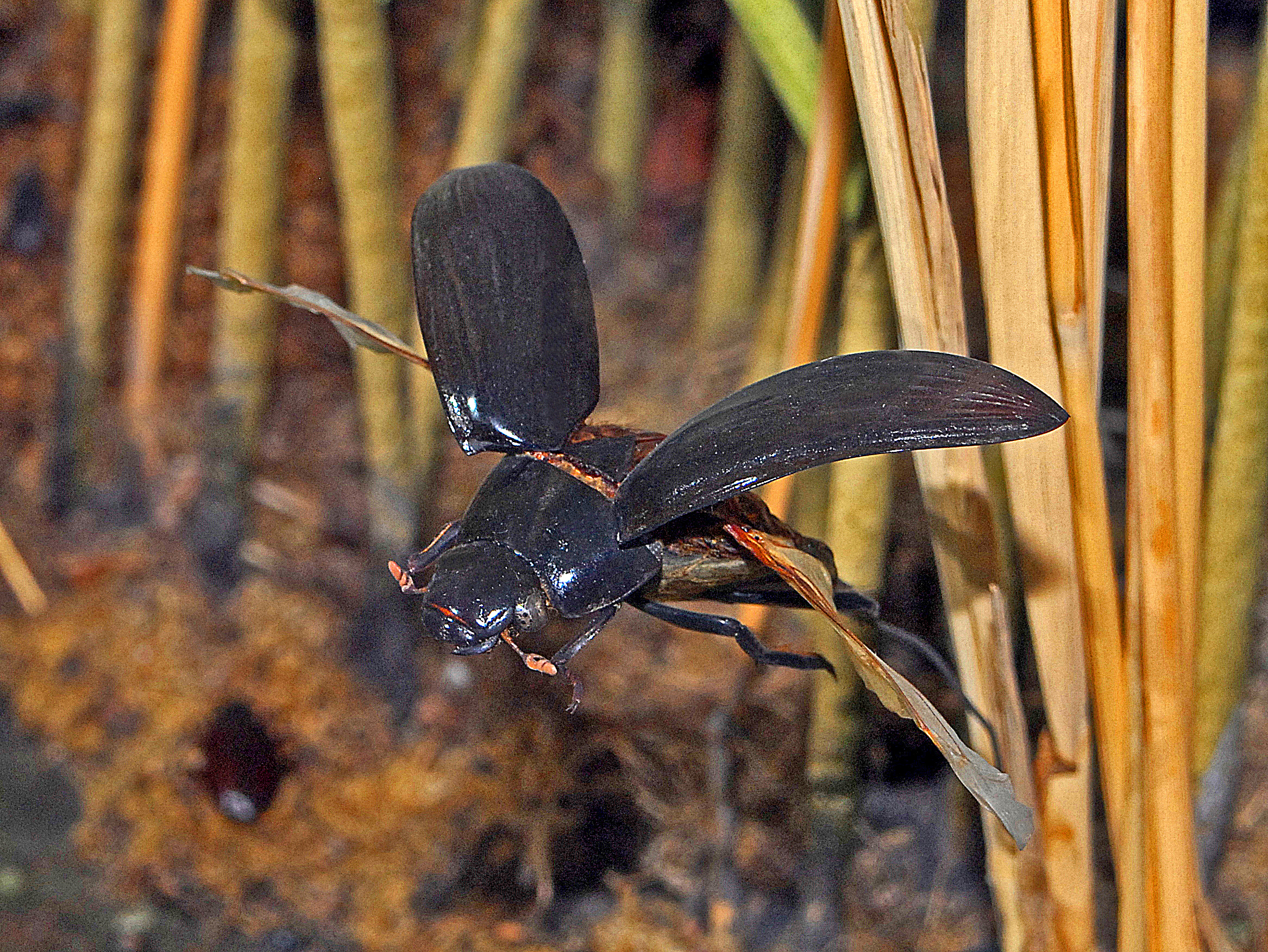
Adult in flight (museum specimen)

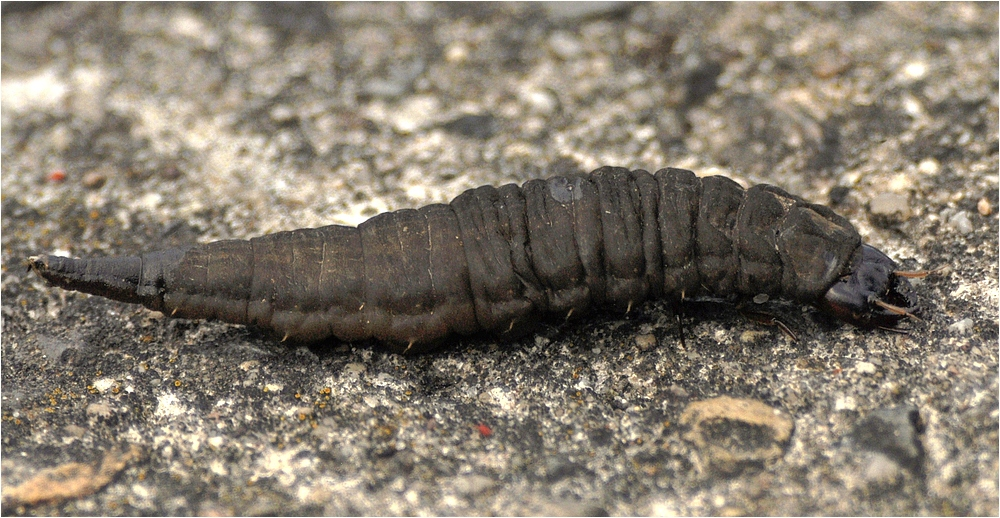
Larvae

This beetle lives in aquatic environments. In some regions it can be found in lakes and ponds. In Greece it can be found in lagoons and estuaries. It has been found at elevations of up to 1,000 m (3,300 ft). In Great Britain it lives in ditches with thick vegetation in marshy areas.

The beetle is omnivorous but favors plant material. It can live for up to three years but most individuals die after breeding during their first year. The larvae feed on freshwater snails of the family Lymnaeidae, drilling holes into the shells to feed on the animals. The grubs can then reach 7 cm (2.8 in) long before pupating in the mud. In the spring, the adult female spins a cocoon, fills it with eggs, and sets it afloat.

== Distribution ==
This beetle is native to the western Palearctic realm, where it occurs throughout much of Eurasia, its distribution extending from Scandinavia to the Mediterranean, North Africa, and Russia, and as far east as India and China. Its distribution is not continuous because it has been extirpated from some areas; it is considered to be extinct in Norway and Luxembourg, for example. It is rare in some regions, being found only in specific and relictual habitat types.
