= Avalon Marshes Partnership =

Group of conservation organisations in the Somerset Levels

The Avalon Marshes Partnership is a group of conservation organisations working together in the Somerset Levels. The members are Natural England, the Royal Society for the Protection of Birds (RSPB), the Somerset Wildlife Trust, the Hawk and Owl Trust, Historic England, South West Heritage Trust and the Environment Agency. Between 2012 and 2016 the scheme was supported by a Heritage Lottery Fund grant of £1,772,500 with additional investment of £920,080 from other sources. The Avalon Marshes Centre, run by Natural England, is near the Shapwick Heath reserve. The network of reserves and private land managed for conservation in the Avalon marshes means that wetland management can be carried out on a landscape scale.

== Landscape ==
At the end of the last glacial period, about 10,000 years ago, the river valley that would eventually form the Somerset Levels gradually became salt marsh as the melting glaciers caused sea levels to rise. By around 6,500 to 6,000 years ago the marshes had become reed beds interspersed with rhynes (ditches) and open water, and parts of the area were in turn colonised by wet woodland. When the plants died in the oxygen-poor environment they decayed to form peat, and as the layers built up they eventually formed a large raised bog, which may have reached an extent of 680 square kilometres (260 sq mi) in Roman times. The formation of the bog was aided by the Somerset Levels' large water catchment area, high rainfall in the Mendips and Blackdown Hills and raised marine clay deposits which restricted drainage to the sea; the same impermeable material underlies the peat, which in places is up to 7.3 metres (24 ft) thick.

== History ==
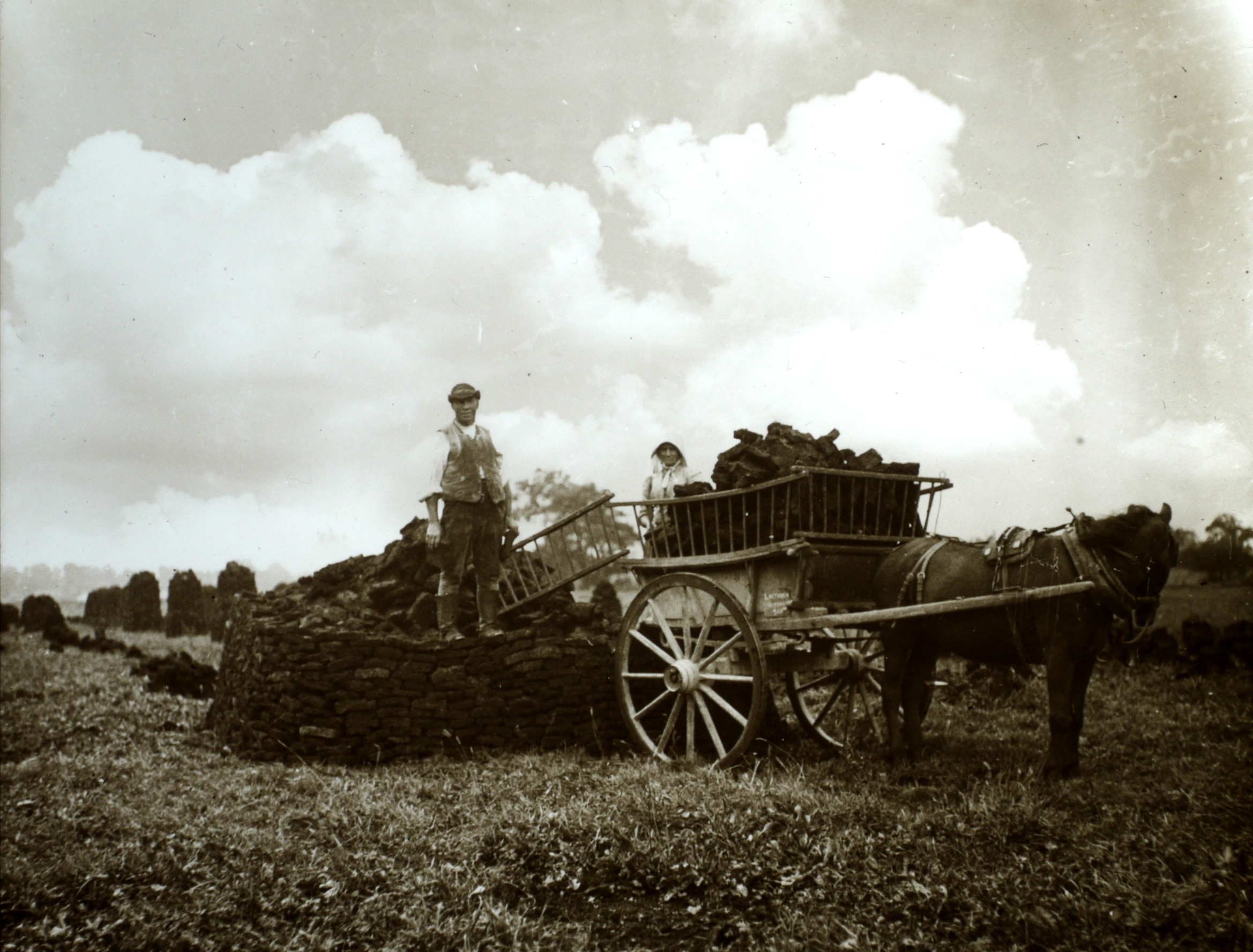
Harvesting peat at Westhay, September 1905

The Somerset Levels have been occupied since the Neolithic period, around 6,000 years ago, when people exploited the reed swamps for their natural resources and started to construct wooden trackways such as the Sweet and Post Tracks, and they were the site of salt extraction during the Romano-British period. Much of the landscape was owned by the church in the Middle Ages when substantial areas were drained and the rivers diverted, but the raised bogs remained largely intact. Only the Inclosure Acts of the 18th century, mostly between 1774 and 1797, led to significant draining of the peat bogs, although the River Brue still regularly flooded the reclaimed land in winter. Following the Somerset Drainage Act 1801 (41 Geo. 3. (U.K.) c. lxxii), parts of the Brue were straightened, and new feeder channels constructed.

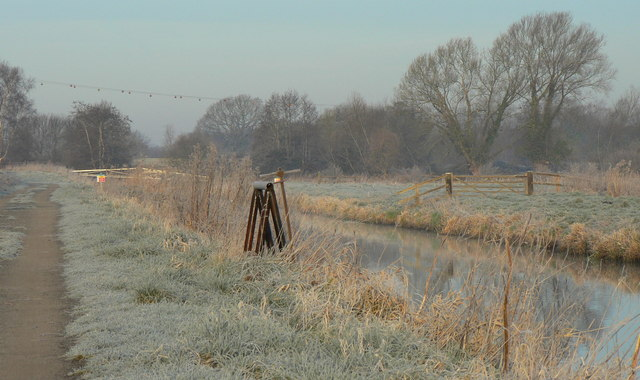
Glastonbury Canal in Shapwick Heath NNR

The Glastonbury Canal which runs through the valley was opened in 1833. It was superseded from 1854 by the Somerset Central Railway line that once ran next to it on its way from Glastonbury to Highbridge. The railway line closed in 1966. The railway and the canal both carried peat and people.

By the twentieth century, large areas of the levels were exploited to meet the demands of horticulture for peat, the owners of the workings, Fisons, reaching an annual production of 250,000 tonnes (250,000 long tons) in the early 1990s. When the demand for peat fell towards the end of the century, Fisons transferred ownership of much of their land to English Nature (now Natural England) in 1994, enabling the creation of 13 square kilometres (5.0 sq mi) of wetland nature reserves from the diggings. English Nature handed the management of 230 hectares (570 acres) at Ham Wall to the Royal Society for the Protection of Birds (RSPB), managing the rest of the land itself apart from an extension to the Somerset Wildlife Trust's existing reserve at Westhay Moor. The area is dissected by drainage channels between plots of land locally called "rhynes", pronounced reens in the east and rhine in the west of the Levels area.

The Avalon marshes lie within the Somerset Levels and Moors Ramsar and Special Area of Conservation site. Shapwick Heath, Westhay Moor, Sharpham Moor and Catcott Edington and Chilton Moors are all designated as Sites of Special Scientific Interest (SSSIs), although Ham Wall is a designated site that does not have SSSI status, instead being a site managed by an approved body. Shapwick, Westhay, Ham Wall and the Huntspill River are also National Nature Reserves.

== Habitats ==
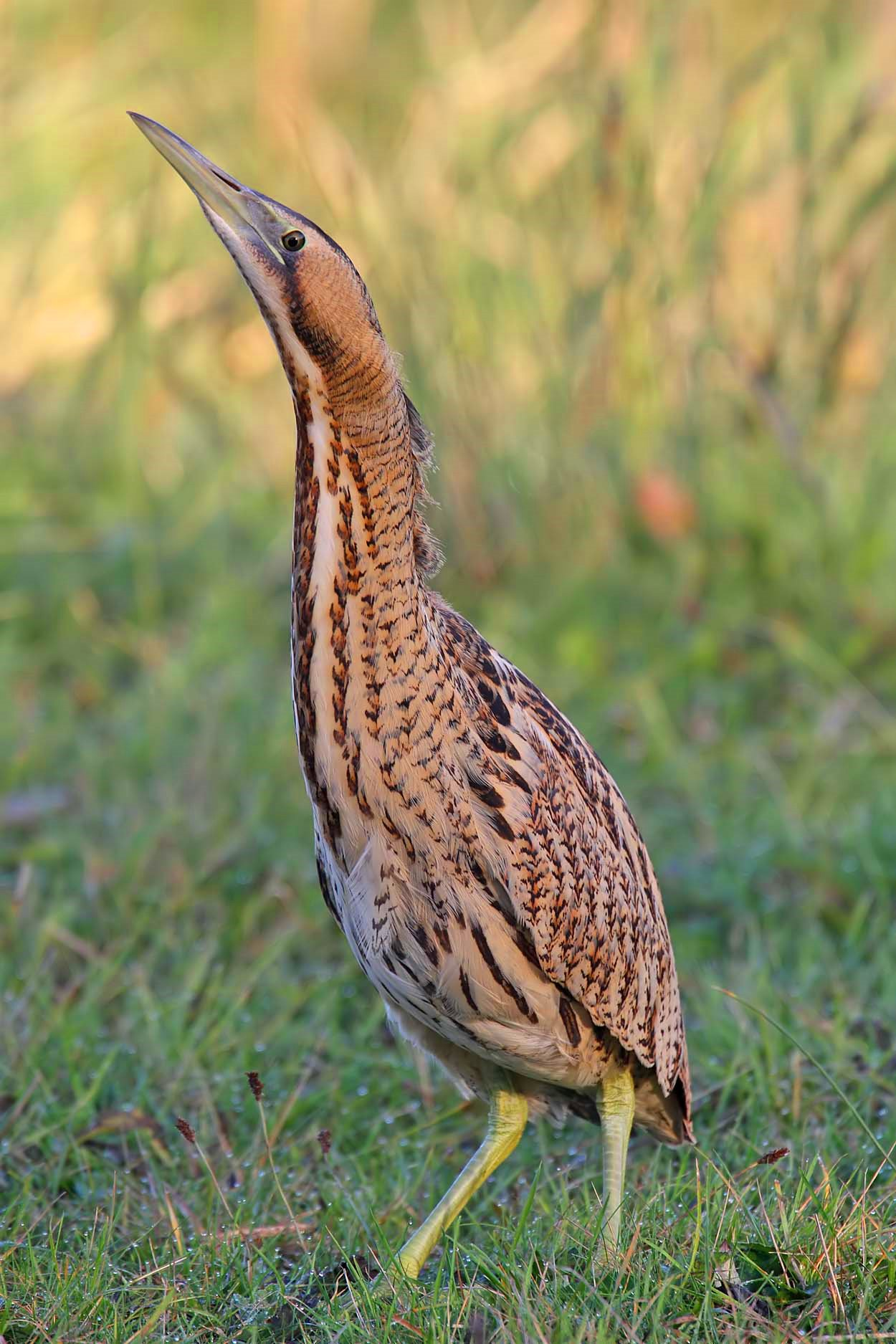
Bittern

The wetland reserves were created by modifying the existing peat workings to created conservation-friendly habitats. The Ham Wall reserve was created specifically to encourage the bittern, which in 1997 had only 11 males present in the UK in the breeding season. The advantage of the Levels was that the allowed large-scale reed bed creation at an inland site with a much lower risk of salt-water flooding than the key coastal sites in eastern England. The peat excavations already had bund walls that allowed the water levels on the reserve to be easily managed in sections, and the workings had removed peat down to the underlying marine clay, a depth of 2 metres (6.6 ft) in this area.

Water levels in reed beds are managed using sluices, pipes and wind-pumps, with deep wide ditches to restrict reed encroachment and provide a habitat for fish, particularly the common rudd, introduced to provide food for the bitterns at Ham Wall, which along with Lakenheath Fen in Suffolk, has been a key part of a bittern recovery programme initiated in 1994 as part of the United Kingdom Biodiversity Action Plan. Both reserves created extensive new reed beds, thereby adding significant additional breeding habitat.

Westhay Moor, in addition to former peat-working habitats, has the largest area of acidic raised bog in the region, with Sphagnum mosses, cotton grass, sundews and other typical species of the habitat. Shapwick Moor had been drained and converted to arable farmland when it was enclosed in the eighteenth century, but since its purchase it has been managed as hay meadow, with late summer cutting, no fertilisers, and grazing by cattle. The water levels have been raised, and hedges and grass margins provide further diversity. The Catcott complex has various habitats including raised bog, restored meadow and former peat workings. The Huntspill River is an artificial waterway built in World War II to supply water to a secret RDX explosives factory at Puriton. With the factory long closed, the river is now a National Nature Reserve managed by the Environment Agency with reed beds, less steep banks and tree planting. Only the Gold Corner pumping station remains of the former works.

== Access and facilities ==
The Avalon Marshes Visitor Centre is the central hub for the management of the reserves. It is located 1 kilometre (0.62 mi) south west of the village of Westhay. The visitor centre has parking, a cafe, an art gallery, as well as offices for the wildlife partners. Additionally, the South West Heritage Trust have built historic replica buildings; a Roman Villa and a Saxon Long Hall. There are plans to rebuild the iron age round house and display a replica viking trading boat.

The reserves are spread about from 3 kilometres (1.9 mi) to 10 kilometres (6.2 mi) west of Glastonbury and mostly butt up together to form a continuous wildlife region.

RSPB Ham Wall can be accessed by car from the minor road that runs between the villages of Meare on the B3151 and Ashcott on the A39. Route 3 of the Sustrans National Cycle Network runs through the reserve. The nearest bus access is in Ashcott, 4 kilometres (2.5 mi) away, and the railway station in Bridgwater is 15 kilometres (9.3 mi) distant.

The reserve is open and free to enter at all times, although its car park has a charge for non-members of the RSPB and closes at night. There are toilets and a small visitor centre which sells light snacks and is usually open only between 10am and 4pm. The main access to the reserve on leaving the car park is the Ham Wall loop; this follows the north bank of the canal, crosses at a bridge and returns via a parallel grass track, 2.7 kilometres (1.7 mi) in total. A short spur runs to the Avalon hide from the canal footpath, and two further circular walks 1.7 kilometres (1.1 mi) and 1.3 kilometres (0.81 mi) in length are accessed from the grass track, a section of boardwalk also linking the two trails. There are two bird hides, two viewing platforms, and many screens on the reserve. Dogs on leads are allowed on the Ham Wall loop (which includes public rights of way), but only assistance dogs elsewhere. The reserve attracts 70,000 visitors annually.

Natural England's Shapwick Heath NNR entrance is on the opposite side of the Meare - Ashcott road. It has a small car park with a parking charge similar to that of Ham Wall. From the car park the old railway path runs the 4 kilometres (2.5 mi) length through the reserve until it meets with the Westhay - Shapwick road. Beyond which, it continues along the North Drain rhyne for another 2 kilometres (1.2 mi) until it ends at Catcott. Dogs are not permitted on the paths through this reserve. The reserve has 6 hides overlooking lakes and reedbed.

At the western end of the reserve the site of the neolithic Sweet Track passes through it and there is a woodland walk following the path which ends at Decoy Lake where a reconstruction of part of the track exists that visitors may walk on a short distance into the reedbed.

Shapwick Moor butts up at the very south westerly end of Shapwick Heath and is a reserve managed by the Hawk and Owl Trust. It has a car park on the Westhay - Shapwick road which is free. The reserve has two hides.

At the west end of the area is Catcott Heath and Catcott Lows which are reserves run by the Somerset Wildlife Trust. The car park for these can be found on the Burtle to Catcott road and is free. The reserves contain three hides and some viewing screens. A raised wet woodland planked path runs through the site connecting some of the hides. The water level on Catcott Lows is variable where it floods in winter attracting many ducks.

Westhay Moor lies approximately 3 kilometres (1.9 mi) north of the village of Westhay and is another reserve managed by Somerset Wildlife Trust. It has a car park accessed from a lane off of the Westhay to Wedmore road and is free. The paths around the reserve allow dogs on leads in most areas but restrict them in others. There are 4 main hides, two tower platforms and a number of screens.

There are also Street Heath, Walton Heath and Westhay Heath wildlife areas which have limited or no public access.

== Management ==
The main management of the wetland reserves involves cutting the reeds in rotation to rejuvenate the reed beds and prevent their drying out. Two machines are used, an amphibious Truxor tracked reed cutter to harvest wetter areas, and a faster Softrak for islands and where water levels have been lowered. Native breeds of cattle are also used to graze the reed bed margins. The cut reeds are turned into a peat-free compost and sold for domestic use. The reed management schemes operate across the area.

Other joint schemes include improved pedestrian and cycle access, and the provision of visitor facilities at Ashcott corner between the Ham Wall and Shapwick Heath reserves.

== Fauna and flora ==
=== Birds ===
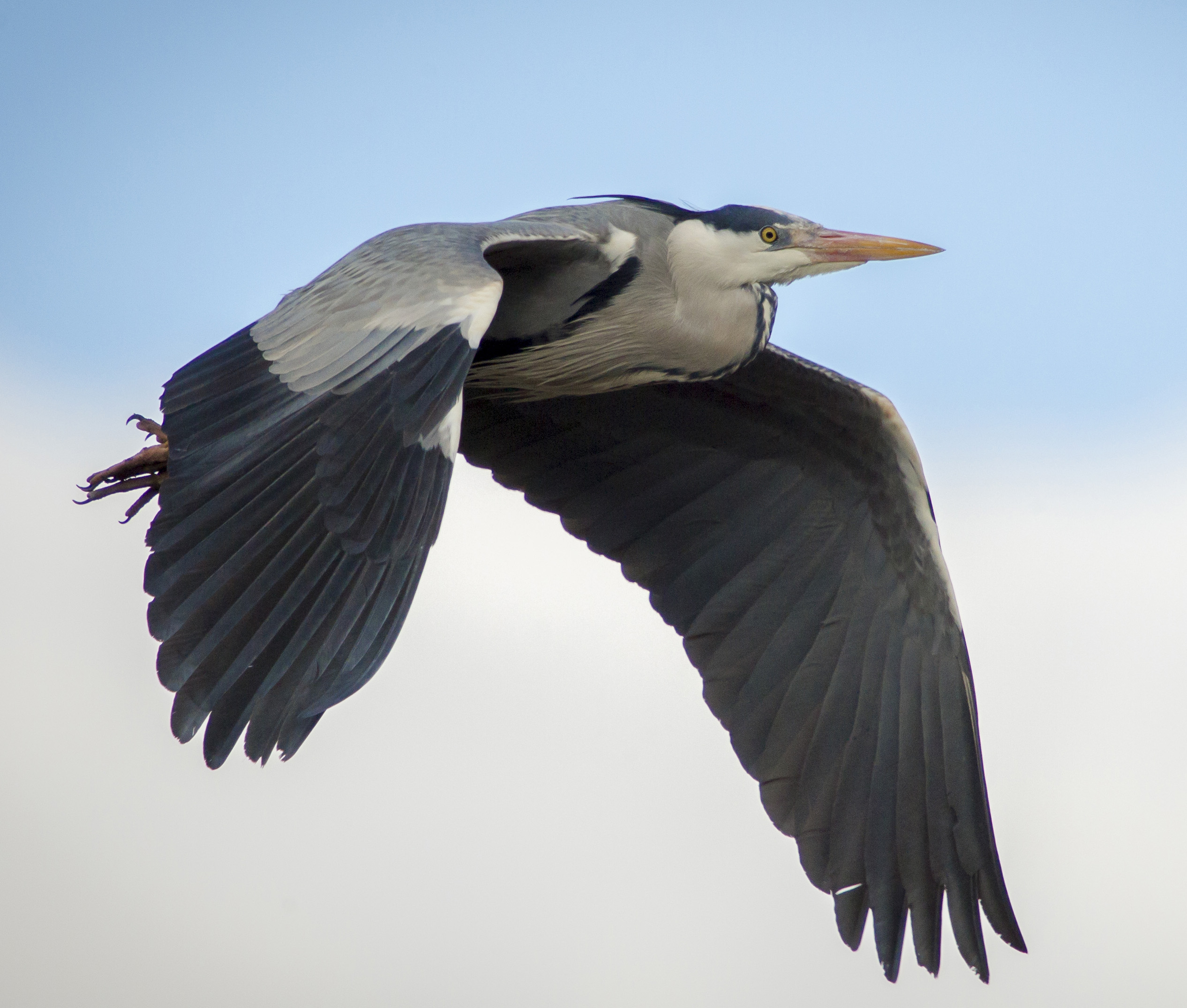
Grey heron at Ham Wall

Following sporadic appearances by males over a number of years, bitterns were first unequivocally proved to have bred at Ham Wall in 2008, and the reserve now typically holds 18–20 breeding males, probably about its maximum capacity, with another 20 males in Shapwwick Heath and Westhay Moor. The wetlands have attracted four other heron species that are attempting to colonise the UK. The formerly rare great white egret first bred in 2012 and has nested in the area in small numbers every year since on the reserve and the neighbouring wetlands. The little bittern was present at Ham Wall from 2009, bred in 2010, and has been present every year since, although breeding by this reclusive bird is difficult to prove in such a large expanse of reed bed. The third coloniser is the cattle egret which had bred elsewhere in Somerset from 2008 to 2010. An influx in 2017 led to six pairs attempting to breed at Ham Wall, four successfully, and 30 birds were present in the area in January 2018. The UK's first successful breeding by black-crowned night herons was at Westhay Moor in 2017.

Other typical wetland species include grey herons, some of which nest in the reed beds instead of their more usual trees, garganeys, marsh harriers, hobbies, bearded tits and Cetti's, reed and sedge warblers. A winter evening roost of common starlings is one of the largest in the UK, and attracts visitors to see hundreds of thousands, sometimes millions, of these birds assemble before descending into the reed bed at Ham Wall and Shapwick Heath.

Rare visitors to the Ham Wall reserve in recent years include a collared pratincole in 2016, a singing male pied-billed grebe in 2013, a blue-winged teal in 2012 and a squacco heron in 2011. The UK's first Hudsonian godwit for 32 years appeared at Shapwick in 2015, the same site hosting a black stork in 2011.

=== Other animals and plants ===
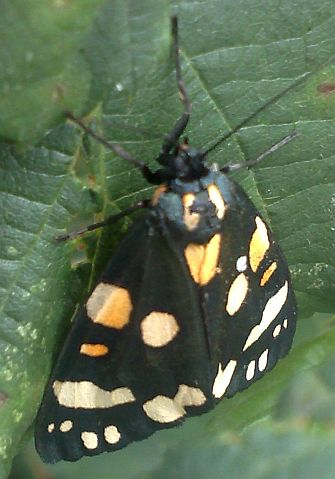
Scarlet tiger moth at Ham Wall, July 2009

Otters breed in the area and two artificial holts have been placed in the reed beds at Ham Wall for their use. Water voles can also be found in suitable habitat. Other restricted species include harvest mice, brown hares and four of the 15 species of bat found in the area.

Grass snakes, three species of newts, common toads and common frogs are found throughout the Avalon Marshes, and non-native marsh frogs occur at Ham Wall and neighbouring Shapwick Heath. Sites for European adder include Westhay Moor and Shapwick Heath, and slow worms and common lizards are also found in suitable habitat.

There are good numbers of fish including common roach, pike, common bream, chub and common dace and much habitat suitable for the European eel. A recent intervention has been the construction of a new EDF Energy-funded eel pass to make it easier for European eels to enter the reserve from the nearby River Huntspill and South Drain. The young eels may remain on the reserve for up to 20 years before returning to the sea to breed.

Invertebrates found in the wetlands include several nationally uncommon aquatic molluscs including the shining ram's-horn snail, the large-mouthed valve snail, and all five species of British river mussels, including the scarce depressed river mussel. Insects include the purple hairstreak, silver-washed fritillary and scarlet tiger moth, although the marsh fritillary, narrow-bordered bee hawk-moth and large marsh grasshopper have been lost to the area since the mid 1990s, suggesting some conservation issues. 27 species of butterfly found at Shapwick include the white admiral and the 19 species of dragonflies and damselflies recorded at Ham Wall include a roost of thousands of four-spotted chasers. The lesser silver water beetle occurs in the wet woodland, and the very rare leaf beetle Oulema erichsoni was noted in 2015.

Apart from the common reed that dominates the marshes, restricted-range plants found in the Brue valley wetlands include rootless duckweed, marsh cinquefoil, water violet, milk parsley and round-leaved sundew.

== Threats ==
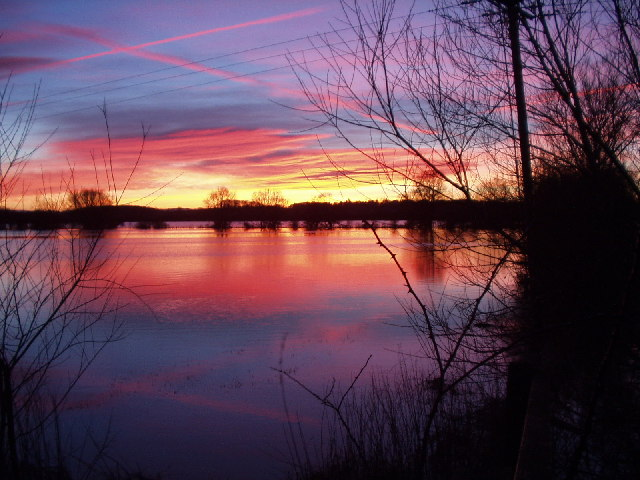
Flooding on the Levels in 2003

Greater unpredictability in the UK climate may lead to heavy summer rains which would adversely affect ground-nesting birds, invertebrates and other wildlife. Although this inland site is not directly threatened by salt-water incursion in the same way as east coast reserves like RSPB Minsmere and Titchwell Marsh, sea level rise will make the drainage of the Somerset Levels more difficult and current water-pumping facilities may become inadequate.

Despite Environment Agency planning, recent significant river flooding events occurred on the Levels in November 2012 and following Cyclone Dirk in winter 2013–2014, the latter leaving 6,900 hectares (17,000 acres) of agricultural land under water for over a month.

Water-based sport and recreation elsewhere in the Levels could possibly enable non-native species to invade the wetlands, and the number of visitors to the area can cause congestion on local roads, particularly those coming for the winter evening starling roost.

== Cited texts ==
- Body, Geoffrey; Gallop, Roy (2001). The Glastonbury Canal. Fiducia Press. ISBN 978-0-946217-08-3.
- Havinden, Michael (1982). The Somerset Landscape. The making of the English landscape. Hodder and Stoughton. ISBN 978-0-340-20116-9.
- Natural England (2010). Shapwick Heath National Nature Reserve. Natural England. Download
- Natural England (2013). NCA Profile:142 Somerset Levels and Moors. Vol. NE451. Natural England. ISBN 978-1-78367-008-6. Download
- Somerset Wildlife Trust (2012). Avalon Marshes Landscape Partnership – Project Information (PDF). Somerset Wildlife Trust.
- Williams, Michael (1970). The Draining of the Somerset Levels (1 ed.). Cambridge University Press. ISBN 978-0-521-07486-5.
- Williams, Robin; Williams, Romey (1992). The Somerset Levels. Ex Libris Press. ISBN 978-0-948578-38-0.
