= Westhay =

Village in England

Coordinates: 51.1789°N 2.8096°W

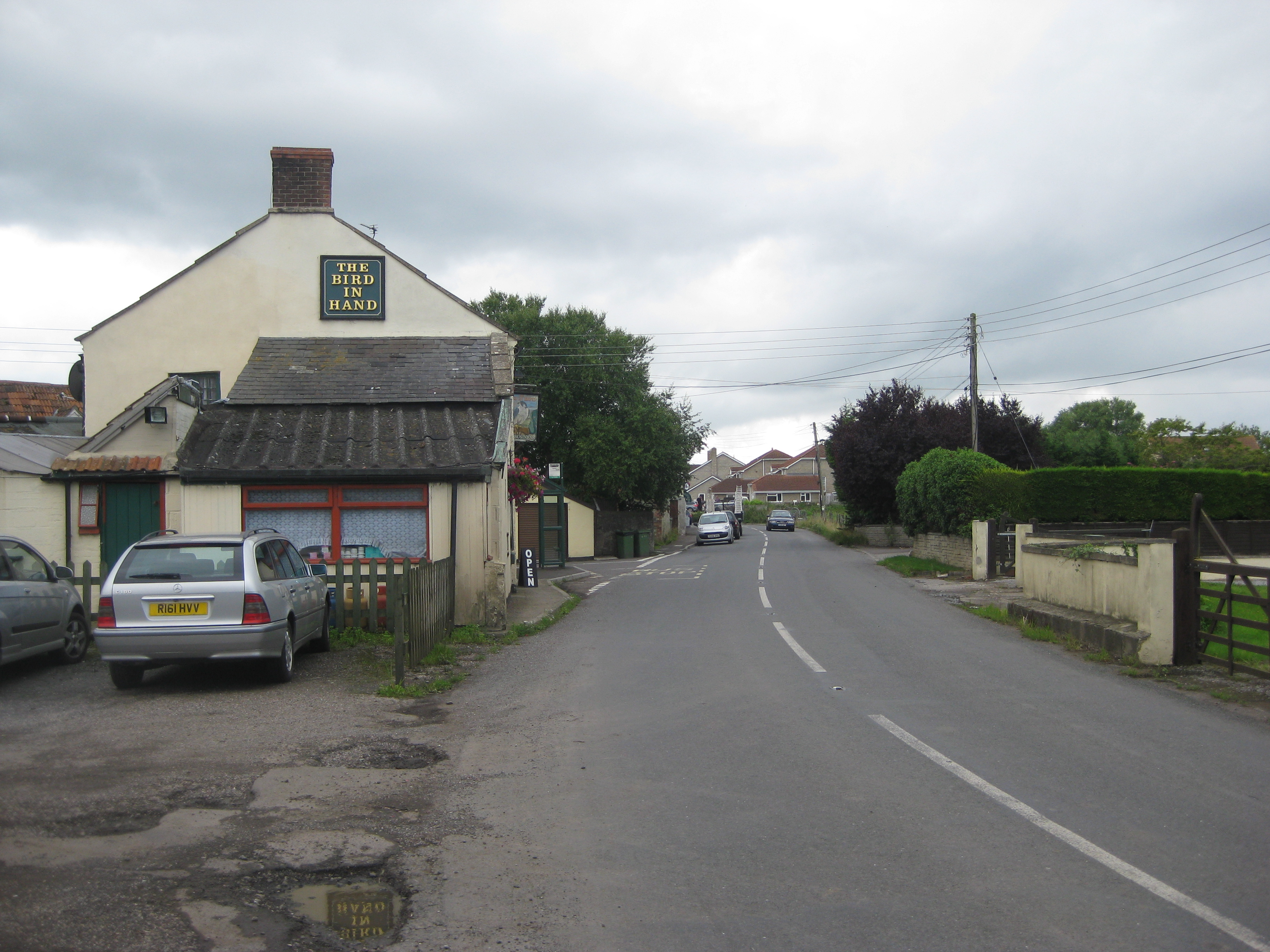
- Northern end of Westhay

- Location within Somerset
- OS grid reference: ST435425
- Civil parish: Meare
- Unitary authority: Somerset Council
- Ceremonial county: Somerset
- Region: South West
- Country: England
- Sovereign state: United Kingdom
- Post town: GLASTONBURY
- Postcode district: BA6
- Dialling code: 01458
- Police: Avon and Somerset
- Fire: Devon and Somerset
- Ambulance: South Western
- UK Parliament: Wells and Mendip Hills

Westhay is a village in Somerset, England. It is situated in the parish of Meare, 4 miles (6.4 km) north-west of Glastonbury on the Somerset Levels.

The name means 'The west field that is enclosed by hedges' from the Old English west and haga. The 'g' in haga is silent.

Westhay is a marshland village on the River Brue in typical Somerset rhyne country, standing on the site of pre-historic lake dwellings. The site of the lake-village is marked by groups of mounds. The nearby Avalon Marshes Centre, where the RSPB, Natural England, Somerset Wildlife Trust and The Hawk and Owl Trust have offices and work bases to manage the local wildlife reserves, has replaced the old Peat Moors Centre which closed down in the autumn of 2009. It also includes a craft centre, cafe, several historic reconstructions and information about the local archeology. The prehistoric Sweet Track and Post Track run from the village southwards towards Shapwick.

The village is close to Westhay Moor, Westhay Heath, RSPB Ham Wall and Shapwick Heath, all of which have been designated as Sites of Special Scientific Interest, and Honeygar, a rewilding project.

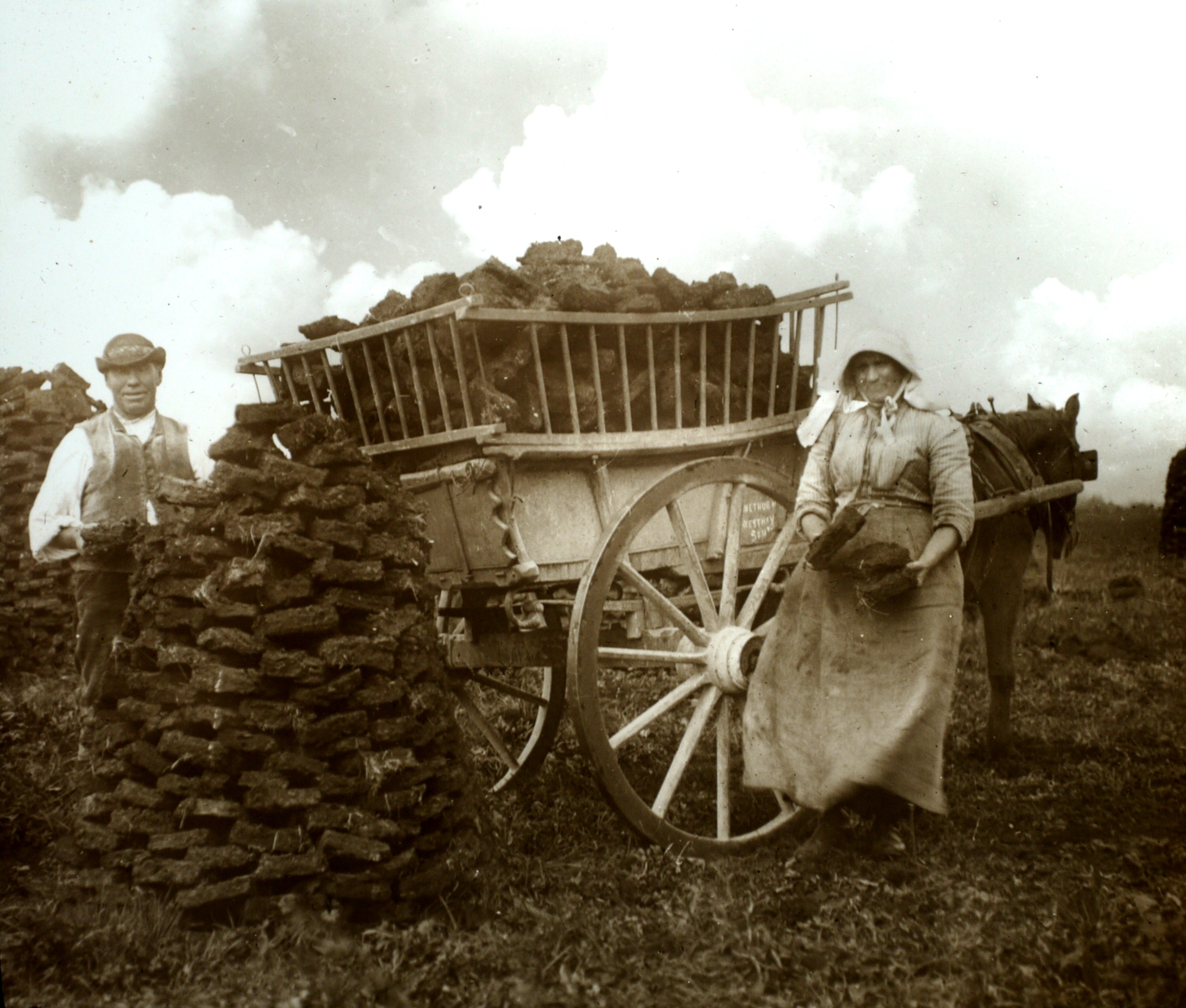
Peat gatherers at Westhay, somerset levels

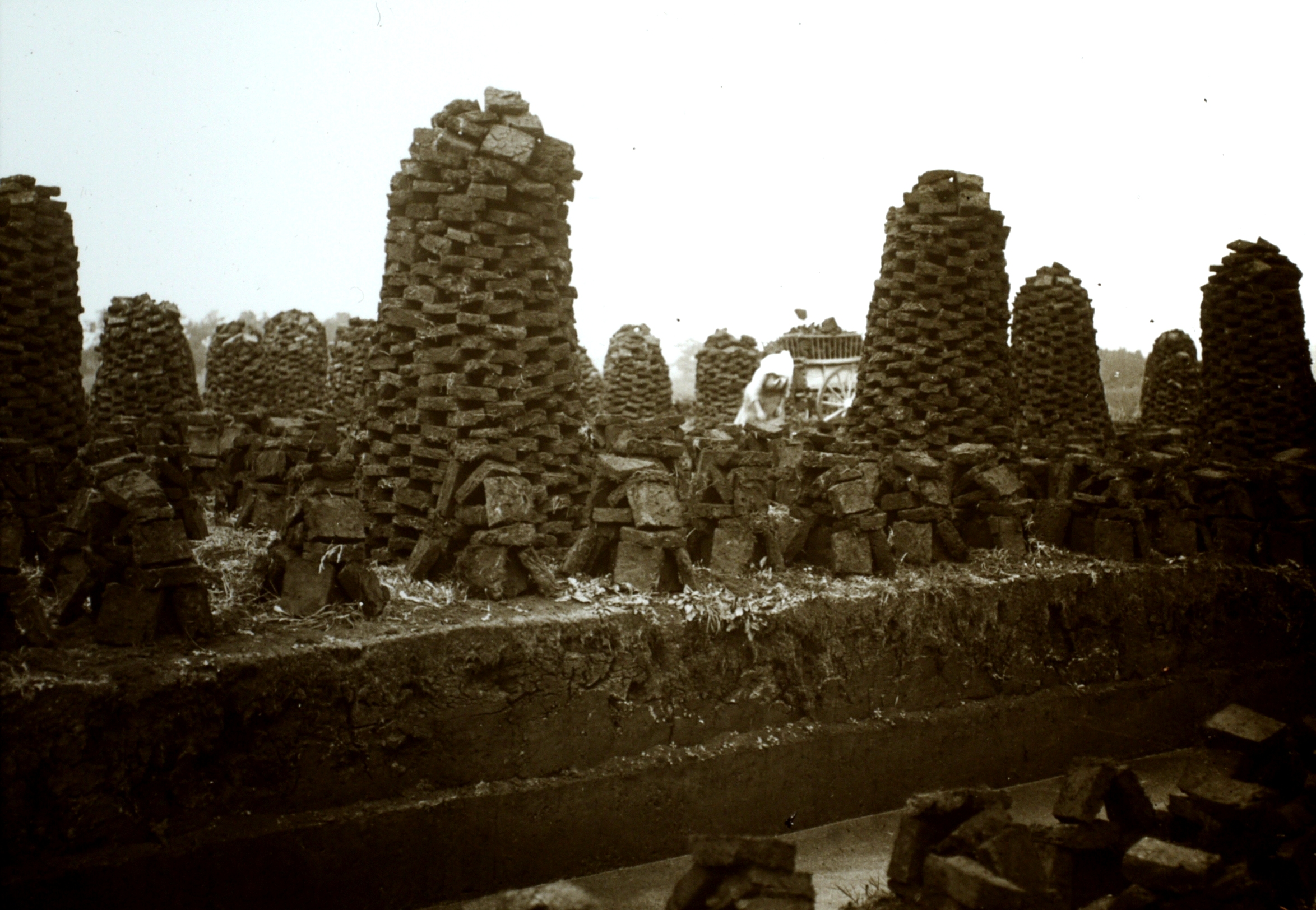
Peat stacks and cutting at Westhay, somerset levels

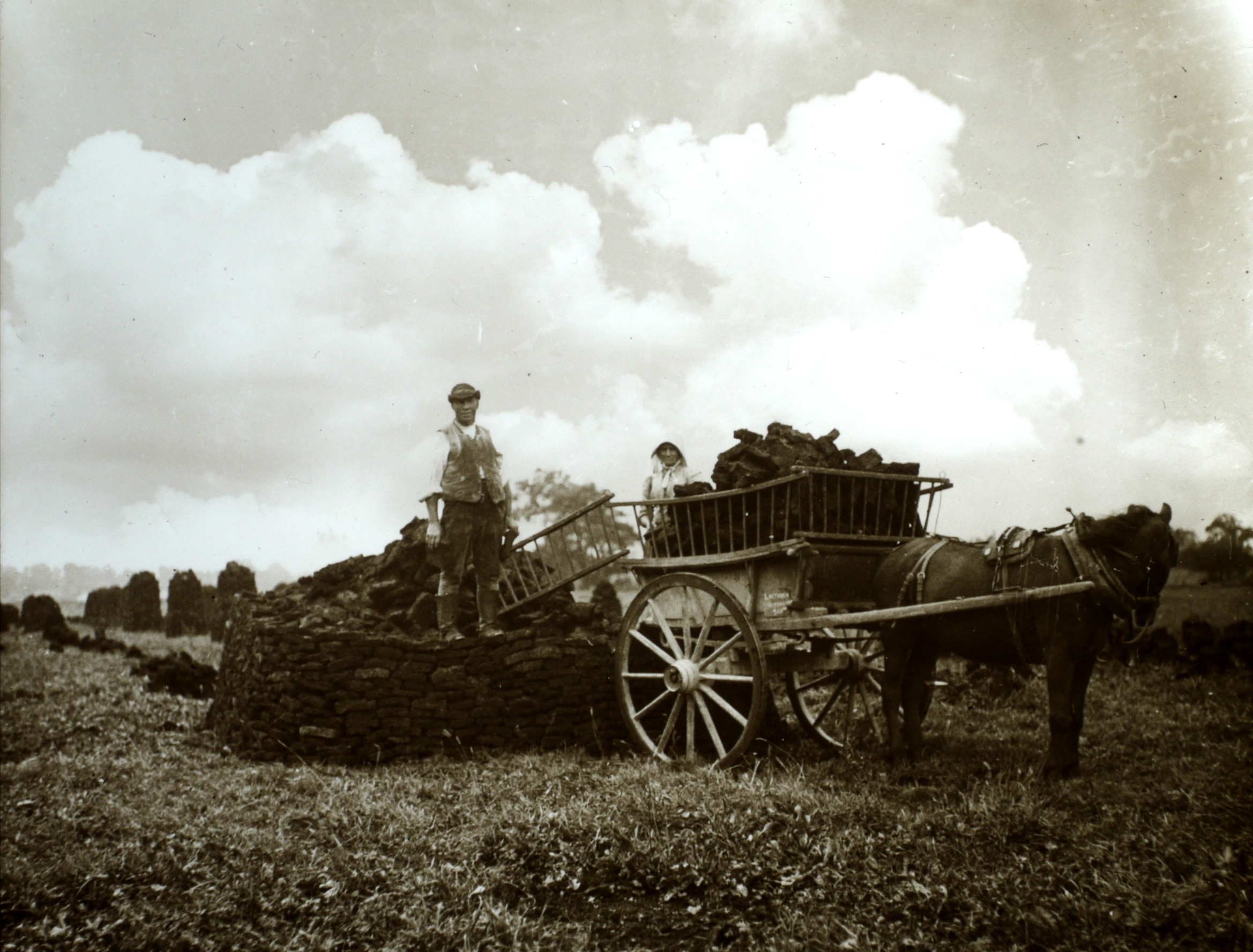
Harvesting the peat at Westhay, somerset levels

Westhay is well known as the site of the Starling Roost featured on many TV wildlife programmes. The roost is in National wildlife reserves such as Westhay Moor, Ham Wall and Shapwick Heath. The area also contains one third of the UK breeding population of Bitterns and the first known UK breeding populations of Great White Egret, Little Bittern, and Night Heron.
