= South Drain =

South Drain may refer to:

- South Drain (river), a river in Somerset, England
- South Drain, Suriname, a town in Suriname
