= Glastonbury Canal =

Canal in Somerset, England

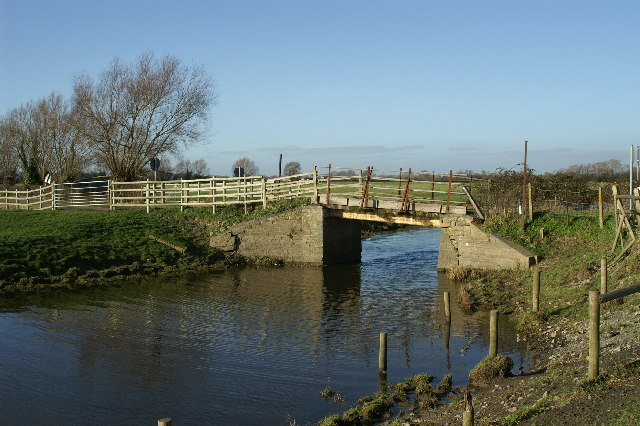
- A bridge over the Cripps River, formerly part of the Glastonbury Canal

Specifications
- Maximum boat length: 64 ft 0 in (19.51 m)
- Maximum boat beam: 18 ft 0 in (5.49 m)
- Locks: 2
- Status: Part used for drainage

History
- Original owner: Glastonbury Canal Company
- Principal engineer: John Rennie
- Date of act: 1827
- Date completed: 1833
- Date closed: 1850

Geography
- Start point: Glastonbury
- End point: Highbridge

The Glastonbury Canal ran for approximately 14 miles (23 km) through two locks from Glastonbury to Highbridge in Somerset, England, where it entered the River Parrett and from there the Bristol Channel. The canal was authorised by Parliament in 1827 and opened in 1834. It was operated by the Glastonbury Navigation and Canal Company. Most of it was abandoned as a navigation channel in 1854, when a railway was built along the towpath.

An earlier canal had been built in the Middle Ages to supply Glastonbury Abbey and the town with stone and produce. In the early 19th century a new canal was proposed to improve commerce in Glastonbury and help with drainage of the surrounding area of the Somerset Levels. Several alternative routes were considered and costed before obtaining an act of Parliament and issuing a prospectus to raise funds for the building of the canal. Construction commenced in the 1820s; however it was more expensive than envisaged and further funds had to be raised. It finally opened in 1833 but was only prosperous for a short period. The shortfall in income and engineering problems with water supply and waterlogged peat causing the clay puddling to fracture meant that it was sold to the Bristol and Exeter Railway. They used the canal to transport materials for the construction of the new Somerset Central Railway which opened in 1854.

== Background ==
Glastonbury is situated in an area of low-lying land, known as the Somerset Levels, through which rivers and drainage ditches (locally called "rhynes") run. There is evidence that the town was served by a medieval canal connecting it to the river system in the Saxon period, and the waterways were later used by the monks who were located at Glastonbury Abbey, both for draining the land and for transport of produce. In the 1750s, the town became a spa town, when the waters of the Chalice Well spring were thought to have medicinal properties, but this did not last for long, while the predominant wool and cloth industries declined as the mills of the north of England took the trade.

The area was hit by severe floods in 1794, as a result of which the Somerset Commissioners of Sewers obtained the Somerset Drainage Act 1801 (41 Geo. 3. (U.K.) c. lxxii), which allowed them to improve the course of the River Brue by the straightening of major loops at Highbridge and East Huntspill, and to construct the North and South Drains, which collected water from the peat moorlands and channelled it into the lower River Brue. Under the terms of the act, two small canals, called Galton's Canal and Brown's Canal, were built near the North Drain to serve peat extraction workings. The drainage works were not wholly successful in preventing flooding, and the Commissioners often failed to obtain the levies they required to finance their operations.

== Promotion and planning ==
One of the key promoters for a canal was Richard Prat, who was a lawyer in Glastonbury, had been the town clerk since 1813, and held several important offices in the town. He saw the canal as a way to halt the economic downturn in the town and its drainage problems, and called a meeting in August 1825, at which a firm plan was formulated. Richard Hammett, a local man from Street, was commissioned to conduct a survey of the route in 1826. Hammett had experience of building a manure canal through peat heathland. He considered two main routes; the first followed the course of the River Brue, but was rejected on the grounds of engineering costs, and the interference with its drainage function. The second route followed the South Drain, which had been newly constructed following floods in 1794, to connect with the River Brue near Cripps Bridge, and to re-use the old course of that River at Highbridge to create a basin.

Hammett estimated that the main work required on the section from Highbridge to the South Drain would be the provision of a towpath. After this, the South Drain would need to be made wider and deeper, but this would aid its drainage function, and would reduce the levy on the local landowners, as the canal company would then be responsible for its maintenance. Two locks would be required on this upper section, with a total rise of just 7 feet (2.1 m). He did not believe that cutting a canal through peat would present serious engineering problems as a result of his previous experience with the manure canal, but he seriously underestimated the cost at £9,000.

Glastonbury Navigation and Canal Act 1827
- Act of Parliament
- Parliament of the United Kingdom
- Long title: An Act for improving and supporting the Navigation of the River Brue, from the Mouth thereof, at its Junction with the River Parrett, to Cripps's House, and for making and constructing a Canal from thence to the Town of Glastonbury in the County of Somerset.
- Citation: 7 & 8 Geo. 4. c. xli

Dates
- Royal assent: 28 May 1827

Text of statute as originally enacted

A prospectus was issued which contained a detailed breakdown of the likely costs, revenue and profits of such a scheme, and the promoters prepared to obtain an act of Parliament. During this time, someone challenged the original survey and another local surveyor was asked to review it. John Beauchamp suggested that no locks would be required on the upper section, but that costs were likely to be £15,234. This was later raised to £18,000, and the Glastonbury Navigation and Canal Act 1827 (7 & 8 Geo. 4. c. xli), which authorised the construction of a canal that followed Hammett's plans, was obtained on 28 May 1827. The proprietors were empowered to raise £18,000 by the issue of 360 shares of £50 each, with powers to raise another £5,000 by mortgage, or to borrow any part of the £18,000 from the Exchequer Bills Commissioners.

== Construction ==
Construction began once the necessary land had been purchased, but it soon became apparent that the original surveys were inadequate. The canal engineer John Rennie was asked to advise the proprietors, and proposed three options, for boats of 120 to 140 long tons (120–140 t), for boats of 40 to 60 long tons (41–61 t), and for barges which were 5 feet (1.5 m) wide. The first was ruled out on cost, the third because of the need to transship all goods at Highbridge, and the second was adopted because it allowed the coasters that worked the Bristol Channel to use the canal. This option required locks of 64 feet (20 m) by 18 feet (5.5 m), and was costed at £28,720. The route would be as authorised, but a single lock was required on the upper section to simplify the water supply. Work resumed in July 1828.

At the Glastonbury end, the canal was required to cross the South Drain and the River Brue. Rennie suggested inverted syphons, rather than locking down into the river and up again, and a cast iron aqueduct for the River Brue crossing was obtained for nearly £3,000 from a Glastonbury blacksmith called John Wright. At the Highbridge end, the plans for a floating harbour to accommodate vessels of up to 250 long tons (250 t) were dropped, and the entrance lock was moved further along the original course of the River Brue. This saved money, but meant that ships did not have to pay lockage charges to reach Highbridge.

The proprietors failed to raise all of the capital promised, and there were financial difficulties. The Somerset Commissioners of Sewers were unhappy with some of the work at Highbridge in 1830, and reported that the contractor "had run away", and work had stopped in 1831. The company had also failed to lodge £1,000 with the commissioners which was required to cover any costs they might have as a result of the construction of the canal, and they sued for the money in 1831. Even Rennie threatened to sue, as much of his fee remained unpaid. The cost of construction was about £30,000, but it appears that some debts were never paid. On 16 December 1831 the proprietors borrowed £5,000 from the Exchequer at a 5% rate of interest.

== Opening ==
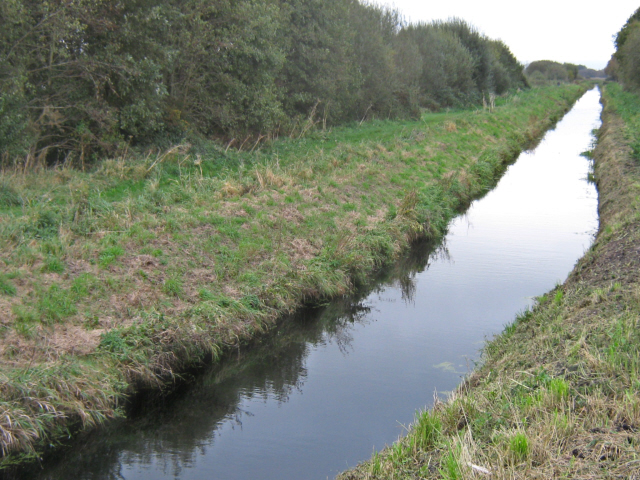
The canal crossing Street Heath

The canal finally opened on 15 August 1833, amid celebrations at both ends of the canal and a cavalcade to and from Highbridge to Glastonbury. A second celebration for the "respectable trading classes" was held nine days later. The first cargo of wood from Canada arrived in July 1835. The canal appears to have been successful initially, but the revenues generated were inadequate, and there were problems with water levels on the upper section. In 1840, the Prat brothers, whose legal firm had played a major part in the creation of the canal, disappeared, leaving a financial shortfall of over £40,000. It appears that they had put up most of the extra costs of construction, and may have borrowed some money from client's funds. They were declared bankrupt and Richard Prat was removed from office as town clerk and a Commissioner of Sewers, but the firm's collapse had a serious effect on the prosperity of Glastonbury.

On the upper section, the final pond prevented the proper drainage of the surrounding land, which being composed of peat, started to swell. This caused the canal itself to rise and the clay puddling to fracture, resulting in further loss of water, and a reduced depth for navigation. Traffic had to be transhipped to smaller boats at Highbridge, which added to the costs of delivery. Receipts for 1848 were £300, which would indicate that the canal was probably only carrying about 4,000 long tons (4,100 t) per annum.

== Closure ==
Bristol and Exeter Railway (Glastonbury Navigation and Canal Purchase) Act 1848
- Act of Parliament
- Parliament of the United Kingdom
- Long title: An Act for enabling the Bristol and Exeter Railway Company to purchase the Glastonbury Navigation and Canal, and for amending the Acts relating to such Railway and Canal.
- Citation: 11 & 12 Vict. c. xxviii

Dates
- Royal assent: 30 June 1848

Text of statute as originally enacted

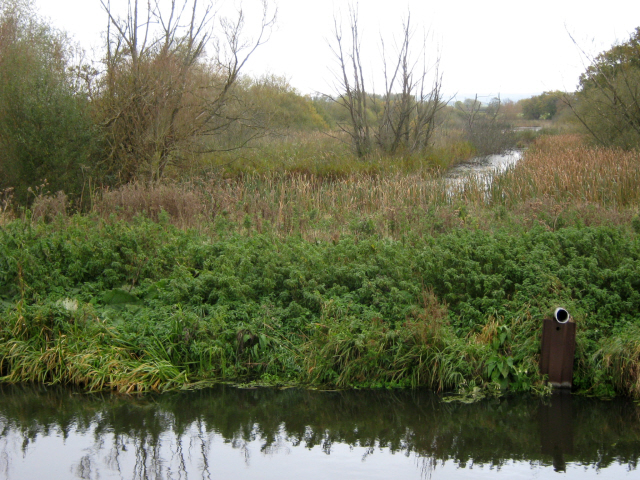
The canal on Meare Heath

Railways arrived in the area in 1841, with the opening of part of the Bristol and Exeter Railway on 14 June, which eventually reached Exeter in 1844. In late 1846, the railway company attempted to buy the canal to prevent its use by rival railway companies. The sale was agreed in principle in June 1847, and was authorised by the Bristol and Exeter Railway (Glastonbury Navigation and Canal Purchase) Act 1848 (11 & 12 Vict. c. xxviii), which was passed on 30 June 1848. The shareholders received £7,372 in 1850, and the canal company was dissolved in 1851.

There was friction between the new owners and the Somerset Commissioners of Sewers. The railway company proposed the creation of a railway between Highbridge and Glastonbury in 1850, and the Somerset Central Railway was authorised by the Somerset Central Railway Act 1852 (15 & 16 Vict. c. lxiii) on 17 June 1852. The canal was transferred to the new company, and was used to speed the construction of the railway, earning £312 in the year ending September 1853. The line followed the route of the canal closely, with much of it built on the towpath. The canal was closed on 1 July 1854, and the lock and aqueducts on the upper section were dismantled. The railway opened on 17 August 1854.

The lower sections of the canal were given to the commissioners for sewers, for use as a drainage ditch. The final section was retained to provide a wharf for the railway company, which was used until 1936, when it passed to the commissioners of sewers and was filled in. The Central Somerset Railway merged with the Dorset Central Railway to become the Somerset and Dorset Railway. The main line to Glastonbury closed in 1966, while the branches to the dairy at Bason Bridge and the Highbridge Wharf lasted until 1972.

== Route ==
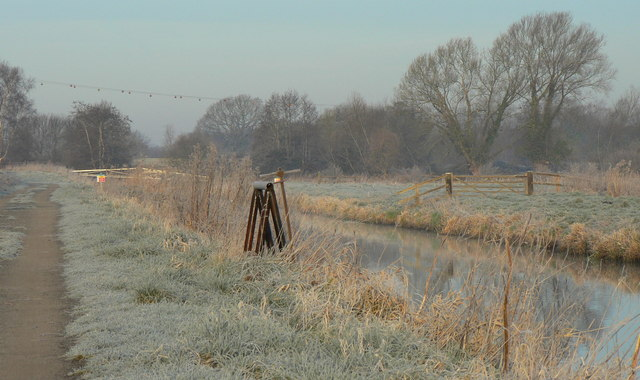
The canal crossing Shapwick Heath national nature reserve

The canal started at a lock constructed on the old course of the River Brue, which had been bypassed by a new cut in 1801 and filled in. It then followed the course of the Brue to Cripps Bridge, after which it followed the Cripps River to Gold Corner. The first part of the Cripps River was originally part of a loop on the River Brue, which was bypassed by a new cut made under the Somerset Drainage Act 1801. Gold Corner is at the point where the Huntspill River, the Cripps River and the South Drain meet.

Following the course of the enlarged South Drain, a lock raised the level of the canal at Shapwick, while the Drain turned off to run parallel to the canal but to its north. The railway ran between the two waterways, crossing to the south side of the canal immediately after the single arched aqueduct and syphon over the South Drain. The remains of the three-arched aqueduct and syphon over the River Brue are still visible, near the old railway bridge, and from there the canal headed towards Glastonbury, passing the Ham Wall and Street Heath nature reserves and making a sharp right-hand turn just before its terminal basin, which was located near the old Glastonbury and Street railway station.

Point	Coordinates (links to map & photo sources)	Notes
Canal wharf in Glastonbury	51.1489°N 2.7279°W	Approximate location
Aqueduct over River Brue	51.1494°N 2.7449°W	
Ashcott Station	51.1534°N 2.7883°W	Station located next to canal at Ashcott Corner
Shapwick Station	51.1673°N 2.8274°W	Station located next to canal
Edington Junction Station	51.1817°N 2.872°W	Station located next to canal
Gold Corner	51.1838°N 2.9063°W	Meeting point of canal with Cripps River and Huntspill River
Cripps River bridge	51.1948°N 2.9051°W	Crossing for Long Moor Drove
Cripps River meets River Brue	51.2023°N 2.9158°W	
Bason Bridge	51.2076°N 2.9376°W	
Starting point in Highbridge	51.22°N 2.9849°W	

== Bibliography ==
- Body, G.; Gallop, R. (2001). The Glastonbury Canal. Fiducia Press. ISBN 978-0-946217-08-3.
- Dunning, Robert (1983). A History of Somerset. Chichester: Phillimore & Co. ISBN 978-0-85033-461-6.
- Hadfield, Charles (1967). The Canals of South West England. David and Charles. ISBN 978-0-7153-4176-6.
- Handley, Chris (2001). The Maritime Activities of the Somerset & Dorset Railway. Bath: Millstream Books. ISBN 978-0-948975-63-9.
- Priestley, Joseph (1831). Historical Account of the Navigable Rivers, Canals, and Railways of Great Britain. London: Longman, Rees, Orme, Brown & Green. ISBN 978-1-4304-7427-2. Archived from the original on 4 March 2016.
- Smith, K. V. H.; Rycroft, D. W. (2013). Hydraulic Design in Water Resources Engineering: Land Drainage: Proceedings of the 2nd International Conference, Southampton University, U.K. April 1986. Springer Science & Business Media. ISBN 978-3-662-22014-6.
