= Honeygar Farm =

Rewilding project in Somerset, England

Honeygar
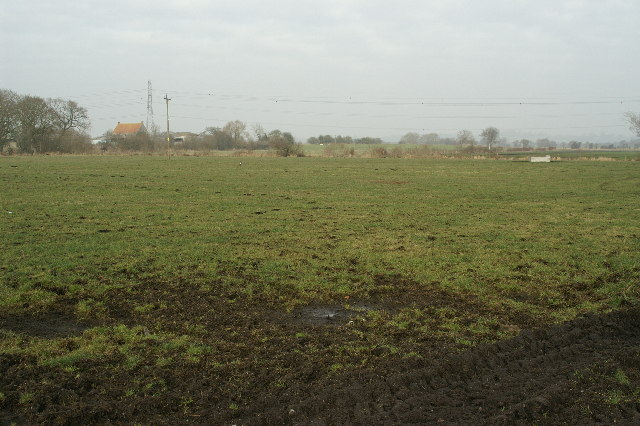
- Honeygar Farm in 2006

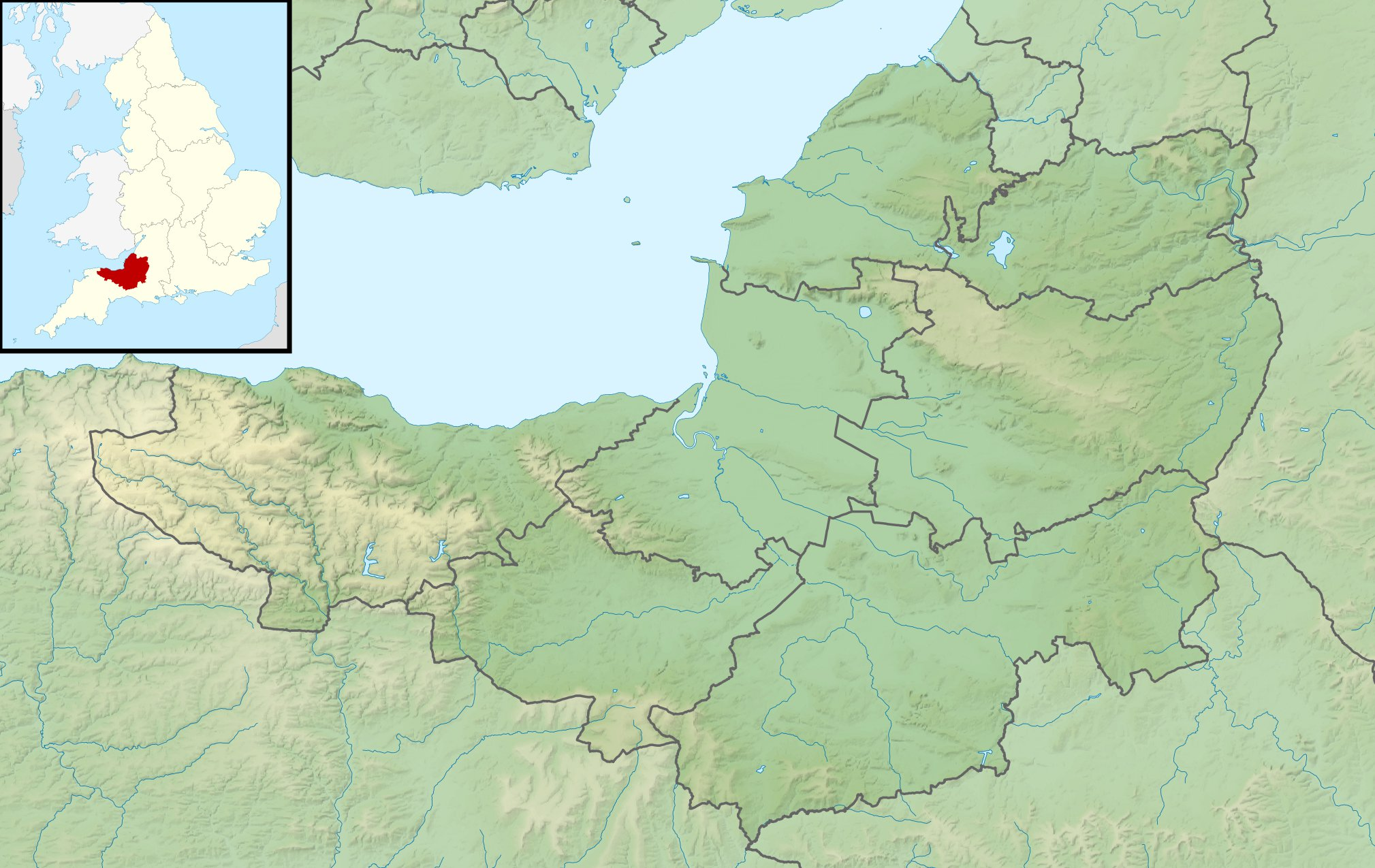
- Location within Somerset
- Type: Rewilding project
- Location: Near Westhay, Somerset
- OS grid: ST 425 425
- Coordinates: 51°10′48″N 2°49′21″W
- Area: 81 hectares (200 acres)
- Operator: Somerset Wildlife Trust

Honeygar Farm, or Honeygar, is a rewilding project of Somerset Wildlife Trust, near Westhay on the Somerset Levels of Somerset, England.

== History and description ==
The Trust announced in August 2021 the purchase of the site, a former dairy farm near the River Brue, by the Esmée Fairbairn Foundation; this would be repaid by the Trust through fundraising. The farm, together with adjacent parcels of land purchased, has an area of 81 hectares (200 acres).

Westhay Moor and Catcott are nature reserves of the Trust in the Avalon Marshes, where the total area held by the Trust, including Honeygar, is 418 hectares (1,030 acres). This and nearby land held by other environmental organisations form the Avalon Marshes Partnership. Honeygar, lying between these sites, would create green corridors for wildlife in the area when managed for nature.

Tony Juniper, chairman of Natural England, said when the purchase was announced: "Places like Honeygar represent fantastic opportunities to demonstrate how simply allowing nature to regenerate itself can be a powerful solution to the ecological and climate crises."

Simon Clarke, head of nature recovery at Somerset Wildlife Trust, has said: "Honeygar will be managed very differently to our nature reserves as it's our first wilded site. There's much to be done to reverse years of intensive management and to transform this nature-poor dairy farm into the wildlife-rich site we know it can be."

A 50-year management plan has been set out. Initial interventions allow the restoration of natural processes such as grazing by herbivores, natural flooding, restoring peat by rewetting the peat soils, and natural afforestation. Describing the project, the Trust recognises that this is a journey: ".... we are learning as we go, so we will take an adaptive approach.... there will be changes to species on the site over time as nature returns...." In managing the site, there will be no attempt to retain any particular species.
