= Street Heath =

Nature reserve in Somerset, England

- Site of Special Scientific Interest
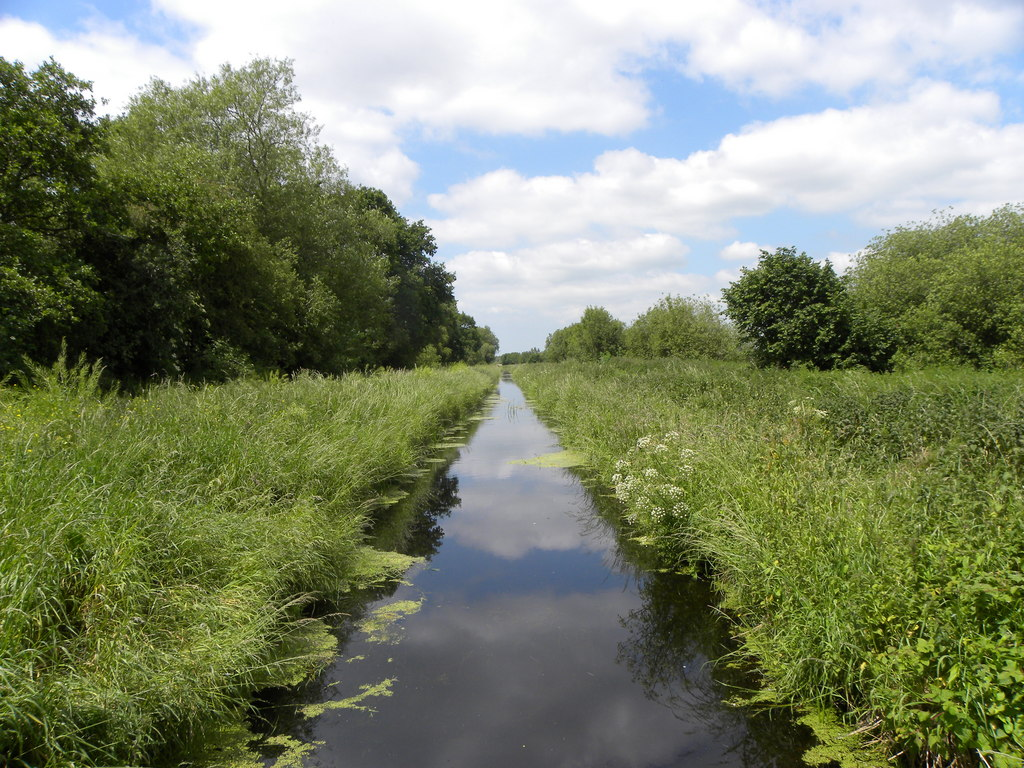

- Location within Somerset
- Location of Street Heath.
- Area of search: Somerset
- Grid reference: ST464394
- Coordinates: 51.15134°N 2.76772°W
- Interest: Biological
- Area: 12.5 hectares (0.125 km^{2}; 0.048 sq mi)
- Notification date: 1966

Street Heath (grid reference ST464394) is a 12.5 hectare (31.0 acre) biological Site of Special Scientific Interest 4 km west of Glastonbury in Somerset, notified in 1966. It next to the Glastonbury Canal and Ham Wall nature reserve. Street Heath has itself been designated as a Local Nature Reserve.

Street Heath is a nature reserve, managed by Somerset Wildlife Trust, which has outstanding examples of communities that were once common on the Somerset Levels. It possesses a vegetation consisting of wet and dry heath, species-rich bog and carr woodland, with transitions between all these habitats. Rare ferns present include marsh fern (Thelypteris palustris) and royal fern (Osmunda regalis). Old peat workings and rhynes have a wetland community which includes bulrush (Typha latifolia), yellow flag iris (pseudacorus), cyperus-like sedge (Carex pseudocyperus) and lesser bur-reed (Sparganium minimum). Insects recorded include 33 species of butterflies, 200 moths and 12 grasshoppers and crickets, with several notable rarities. Birds breeding in the carr woodland include the local willow tit
