= Glastonbury Canal (medieval) =

The medieval Glastonbury canal was built in about the middle of the 10th century to link the River Brue at Northover (51°08′18″N 2°44′09″W) with Glastonbury Abbey, a distance of about 1.75 kilometres (1,900 yd). Its initial purpose is believed to be the transport of building stone for the abbey, but later it was used for delivering produce, including grain, wine and fish, from the abbey's outlying properties. It remained in use until at least the 14th century, but possibly as late as the mid-16th century. English Heritage assess the canal remains, based on a "provisional" interpretation, as a site of "national importance".

== Construction ==
Modern archaeological excavations have shown that this was a "true canal" 5 metres (16 ft) wide and 1 metre (3.3 ft) deep, with a flat bottom and sloping sides. The place where it met the River Brue, then flowing about 80 metres (90 yd) north of its present course, was already significant: it had been an important crossing point, with a timber causeway over the river and the associated marshy floodplain, since at least the 8th century. For most of the canal's length it was dug through firm clay, following a level course along the 10-metre contour on the north-west side of Wearyall Hill, but at its end point, close to the Saxon-era market place (still extant at 51°08′50″N 2°43′05″W) it encountered less stable soil. Here the banks were revetted with timber and a wharf was possibly constructed. Radio-carbon analysis of this wooden material indicates a 10th-century, or possibly slightly earlier, date. It was fed by springs at this north-eastern end.

== Use ==
At this period Dunstan, the abbot, was engaged in reconstructing Glastonbury Abbey and the canal was needed to import the stone and other building materials. Dunstan had suffered a temporary period of exile in Ghent and may have brought back knowledge of canals from there to direct the construction of this new waterway. Much of the stone came from the abbey's own quarries at Doulting, allowing access by way of the River Sheppey at Pilton.

From the 11th century onwards Glastonbury Abbey became the centre of a large water-borne transport network as further canalisations and new channels were made in the region, including the diversion of the Brue to afford access to the important estate at Meare and an easier route to the Bristol Channel. In the 13th century the abbey's head boatman is recorded as using the waterways to take the abbot in an eight-oared boat on visits to the abbey's manors in the area. Datable pottery sherds in the silt from the floor of the canal show that it was still in operation in the 14th century, but is not clear when it fell out of use: although the northernmost part may have been filled in during the 14th century, for most of its length it may have been maintained until the Dissolution of the Monasteries in the 16th century.

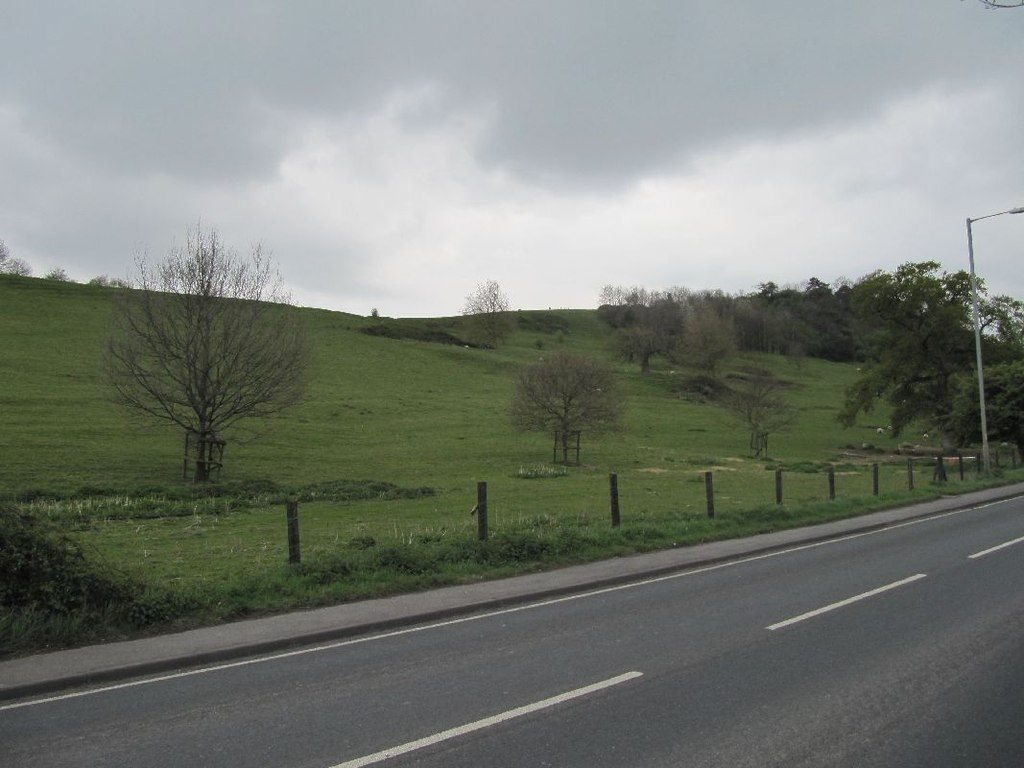
Ditch at the foot of Wearyall Hill, along the line of the canal

== Rediscovery ==
In 1886 John Morland, a local archaeologist, questioned the purpose of the old canal, identified by its sunken outline, water-filled in winter, along Wearyall Hill. Aerial photography, followed by rescue archaeology at the site of commercial development, was undertaken in 1986–7, and this uncovered the supposed wharf area. In 1989, during the construction of a roundabout to the south-west of the town, it was confirmed that the 1821 turnpike, now the A39, had made use of the upraised canal bank in its construction.
