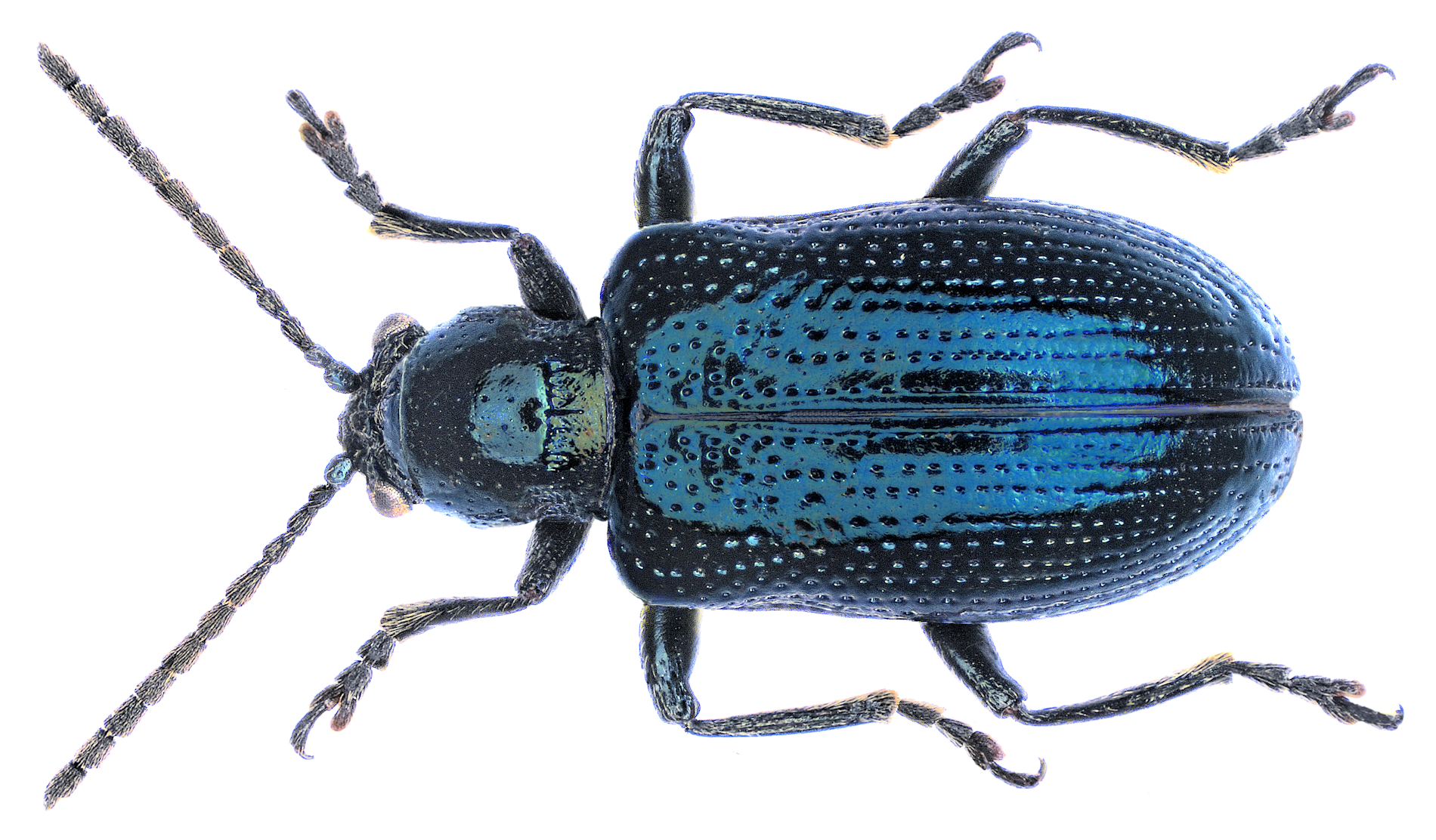

Scientific classification
- Domain: Eukaryota
- Kingdom: Animalia
- Phylum: Arthropoda
- Class: Insecta
- Order: Coleoptera
- Suborder: Polyphaga
- Infraorder: Cucujiformia
- Family: Chrysomelidae
- Subfamily: Criocerinae
- Tribe: Lemini
- Genus: Oulema
- Species: O. erichsonii

Binomial name
- Oulema erichsonii (Suffrian, 1841)

Synonyms
- Lema erichsonii Suffrian, 1841

= Oulema erichsonii =

Species of beetle

Oulema erichsonii is a species of leaf beetle, family Chrysomelidae. It is widespread in Europe. It was first described by German entomologist Christian Wilhelm Ludwig Eduard Suffrian in 1841.

Oulema erichsonii is a rare species in the UK where it has been recorded only in Somerset, including at Ham Wall reserve. It is highly endangered due to habitat loss; one study performed in Tübingen, Germany, found this species exclusively in a sample of autumnally unmown lawn, but not in mown lawn samples.
