= Westhay Heath =

- Site of Special Scientific Interest
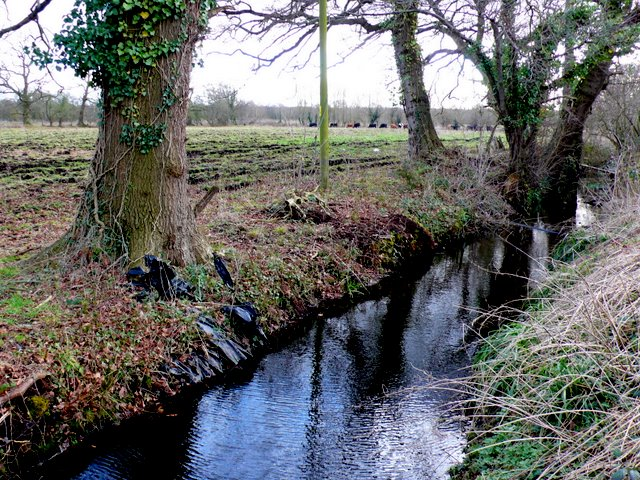

- Location within Somerset
- Location of Westhay Heath.
- Area of search: Somerset
- Grid reference: ST415422
- Coordinates: 51.17603°N 2.83823°W
- Interest: Biological
- Area: 25.9 hectares (0.259 km^{2}; 0.100 sq mi)
- Notification date: 1990

Westhay Heath (grid reference ST415422) is a 25.9 hectare (64.0 acre) biological Site of Special Scientific Interest 2km west of Westhay village in Somerset, notified in 1990.

Westhay Heath, which is managed by the Somerset Wildlife Trust is an area of tall fen vegetation containing scrub, marshy grassland, ditches and small ponds in the heart of the peat moors on the Somerset Levels. This mosaic of habitats has developed on areas previously used for peat extraction. The site is of importance for the presence of a nationally rare fen community, including a diverse assemblage of breeding and wintering birds.
