= River Huntspill =

River in Somerset, England

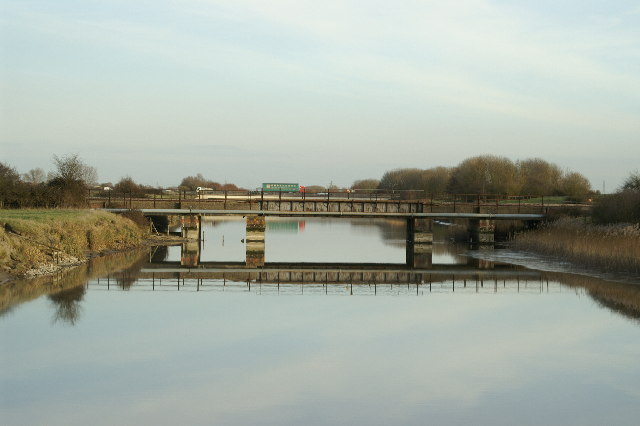
- The Huntspill river crossed by a railway bridge and the M5 motorway

Location
- Country: England
- County: Somerset
- Region: Somerset Levels
- District: Sedgemoor
- City: Street

Physical characteristics
- Mouth: River Parrett
  - location: Huntspill, Somerset, England
  - coordinates: 51°12′29″N 3°00′52″W
  - elevation: 0 ft (0 m)
- Length: 5 mi (8.0 km)

The River Huntspill (or Huntspill River) is an artificial river, in the Somerset Levels, in the Sedgemoor district of Somerset, England. It was built in 1940 to supply process water to ROF Bridgwater, and has resulted in reduced flooding of the lower Brue Valley. Huntspill Sluice at the river's western end, also known as West Huntspill Sluice, separates it from the River Parrett.

A large section of the river and its surrounding lands has been designated as a national nature reserve which is managed by the Environment Agency.

== History ==
The concept for the Huntspill River was first suggested by J. Aubrey Clark in 1853, as a way of improving the drainage of the lower River Brue. Despite his vigorous support for the plan, no action was taken, largely due to the difficulties of getting the two divisions of the Court of Sewers, one responsible for the river system above Langport and the other for that below Langport, to agree on who was responsible and how such a scheme would be funded.

At the outbreak of World War II a new explosives factory, ROF Bridgwater, was proposed. This would need 4.5 million imperial gallons (20 Ml; 5.4M US gal) of process water per day. Louis Kelting, the Chief Engineer of the Somerset Catchment Board revived Clark's plans, and combined the water supply solution with a drainage scheme. In addition to supplying water to the factory an area of 45,000 acres (18,000 ha) was drained of which 4,000 acres (1,600 ha) regularly flooded.

A 5-mile (8.0 km) straight channel was excavated using a dragline excavator during the early years of World War II. It was constructed as a priority war work, because of its importance to the munitions factory. The plans had been drawn up in late 1939, and by January 1940 the first excavations were being made.

It ran from Gold Corner, where it was connected to the South Drain, to a new outfall on the estuary of the River Parrett, and had retention sluices at both ends, so that it acted as a long reservoir. It was intended that in the summer, when water supply was lower, it would serve as a reservoir with water pumped from the moors; in winter as a drainage channel, via gravity drainage.

The plans were for a 25-foot (7.6 m) channel, with the excavated earth used to create flood banks at its edges. At this depth, water could flow into it from the moors by gravity, but problems were experienced with the design. Because the underlying soil was peat, the weight of the flood bank caused it to rotate and push upwards in the bottom of the channel. Experiments were carried out to find the optimum size for a stable channel, and the result was one that was only 16 feet (4.9 m) deep. The flood banks could not exceed 15 feet (4.6 m) in height, and had to be set back from the edge of the channel by at least 30 feet (9.1 m). Because of the lack of depth, water from the South Drain had to be pumped into the river. The existing pumping station at Gold Corner could not cope with all the water from the drain, as well as flood water from the moors, so had to be enlarged.

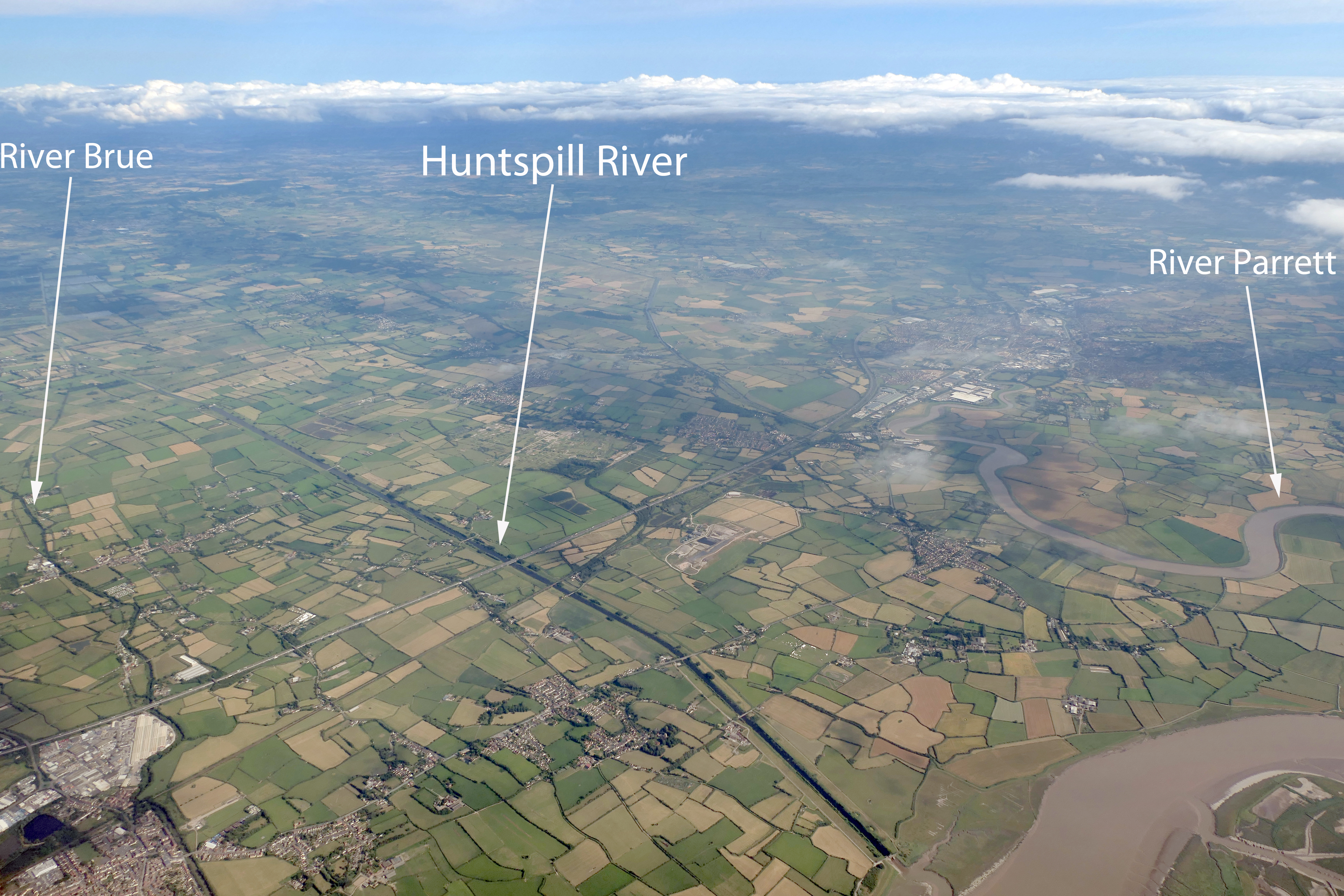

Once the entire flow of the South Drain was entering the river, the section northwards from Gold Corner to the River Brue became redundant. Rather than allow it to silt up, it was enlarged, and Cripps sluice constructed where it met the Brue. This enabled water from the Brue, which had nowhere to go because its outlet was blocked by high tides, to be diverted southwards to the Huntspill river, with the result that flooding in the Brue valley was significantly reduced. The pumping station, with four Sultzer horizontal pumps which are powered by two-cylinder oil engines made by Crossley, has since been modernised including the conversion of one of the pumps to use electricity and replacing the fuel tanks.

Excavation of the channel cut through an area containing Roman salt works, the remains of which can be seen beside the river. The ground conditions made construction of bridges difficult, and required piles to be driven down to the underlying rock, some 60 feet (18 m) long, and one bridge requiring 80-foot (24 m) piles. The first of the pumps was operational by July 1942, and the pumping station was completed by the end of 1942. The total cost of the project was £411,594 (equivalent to £16,767,024 in 2025), which included £35,000 for the construction of the new pumping station, and £26,000 to purchase the machinery fitted into it.

== Flora and fauna ==
A 366-acre (148 ha) stretch of the river, from Gold Corner to Huntspill Sluice (excluding the Cripps River), is a national nature reserve. The NNR is managed by the Environment Agency, rather than by Natural England, responsible for most of the other reserves in England. This arrangement is authorised by section 35 of the Wildlife and Countryside Act 1981, and funding for the maintenance and upkeep of the river as a reserve is still provided by Natural England. The river and its catchment area include several Sites of Special Scientific Interest; of these, Street Heath, Shapwick Heath, and Westhay Heath are affected by water levels in the South Drain, while the water levels in Catcott, Edington and Chilton Moors SSSI are directly controlled by Gold Corner pumping station. This site has been designated because of the types of flowers found in its wet grasslands, the variety of wildlife found in its ditches, and its populations of wading birds, particularly lapwing, redshank and snipe.

The river discharges into the River Parrett just south of Highbridge. The Parrett flows into Bridgwater Bay, which is also an important national nature reserve, on the edge of the Bristol Channel.

== Water quality ==
The Environment Agency measure water quality of the river systems in England. Each is given an overall ecological status, which may be one of five levels: high, good, moderate, poor and bad. There are several components that are used to determine this, including biological status, which looks at the quantity and varieties of invertebrates, angiosperms and fish. Chemical status, which compares the concentrations of various chemicals against known safe concentrations, is rated good or fail.

The water quality of the Huntspill River was as follows in 2019.

Section	Ecological status	Chemical status	Length	Catchment	Channel
Huntspill	Moderate	Fail	4.9 miles (7.9 km)	11.73 square miles (30.4 km^{2})	artificial

Like most rivers in the UK, the chemical status changed from good to fail in 2019, due to the presence of polybrominated diphenyl ethers (PBDE) and mercury compounds, neither of which had previously been included in the assessment.

== Points of interest ==
Point	Coordinates (Links to map resources)	OS Grid Ref	Notes
Huntspill sluice	51.2064°N 3.0138°W	ST292457	River Parrett
A38 Bleak Bridge	51.1982°N 2.9928°W	ST307448	
M5 motorway bridge	51.1941°N 2.9709°W	ST322443	
Intake to ROF Bridgwater	51.1903°N 2.9498°W	ST337438	
Gold Corner entry sluice	51.1832°N 2.9069°W	ST367430	Cripps River and South Drain

== Bibliography ==
- Agency (1996). "Gold Corner Pumping Station" (PDF). Environment Agency. Archived (PDF) from the original on 30 July 2018.
- Williams, Michael (1970). The Draining of the Somerset Levels. Cambridge: Cambridge University Press. ISBN 978-0-521-07486-5.
