= South Drain (river) =

River in Somerset, England

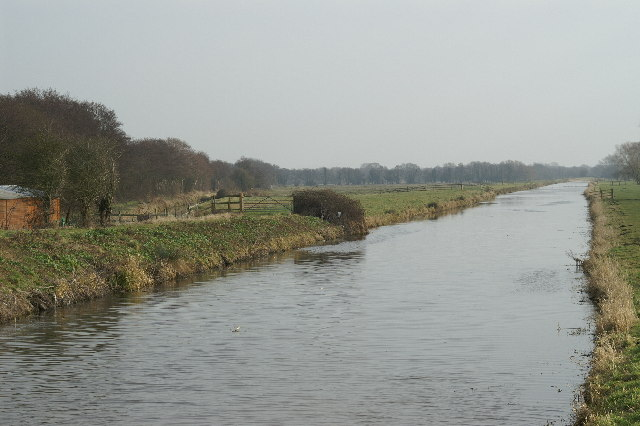

Location
- Country: England
- County: Somerset
- District: Somerset

Physical characteristics
- Source: Read Mead Rhyne
  - location: Street, Somerset, England
  - coordinates: 51°08′02″N 2°43′53″W
- Mouth: Huntspill River
  - location: Highbridge, Somerset, England
  - coordinates: 51°10′59″N 2°54′23″W
- Length: 15 km (9.3 mi)

Basin features
- Tributaries
  - right: Glastonbury Canal

The South Drain flows in a generally north-westerly direction from Actis Tunnel to Gold Corner, where it moves on to the Huntspill River, in Somerset, England. It flows through the Shapwick Heath Nature Reserve.

It was constructed between 1802 and 1806 as a result of the Somerset Drainage Act 1801 (41 Geo. 3. (U.K.) c. lxxii).
