= Ham Wall =

Wetland nature reserve in Somerset, England

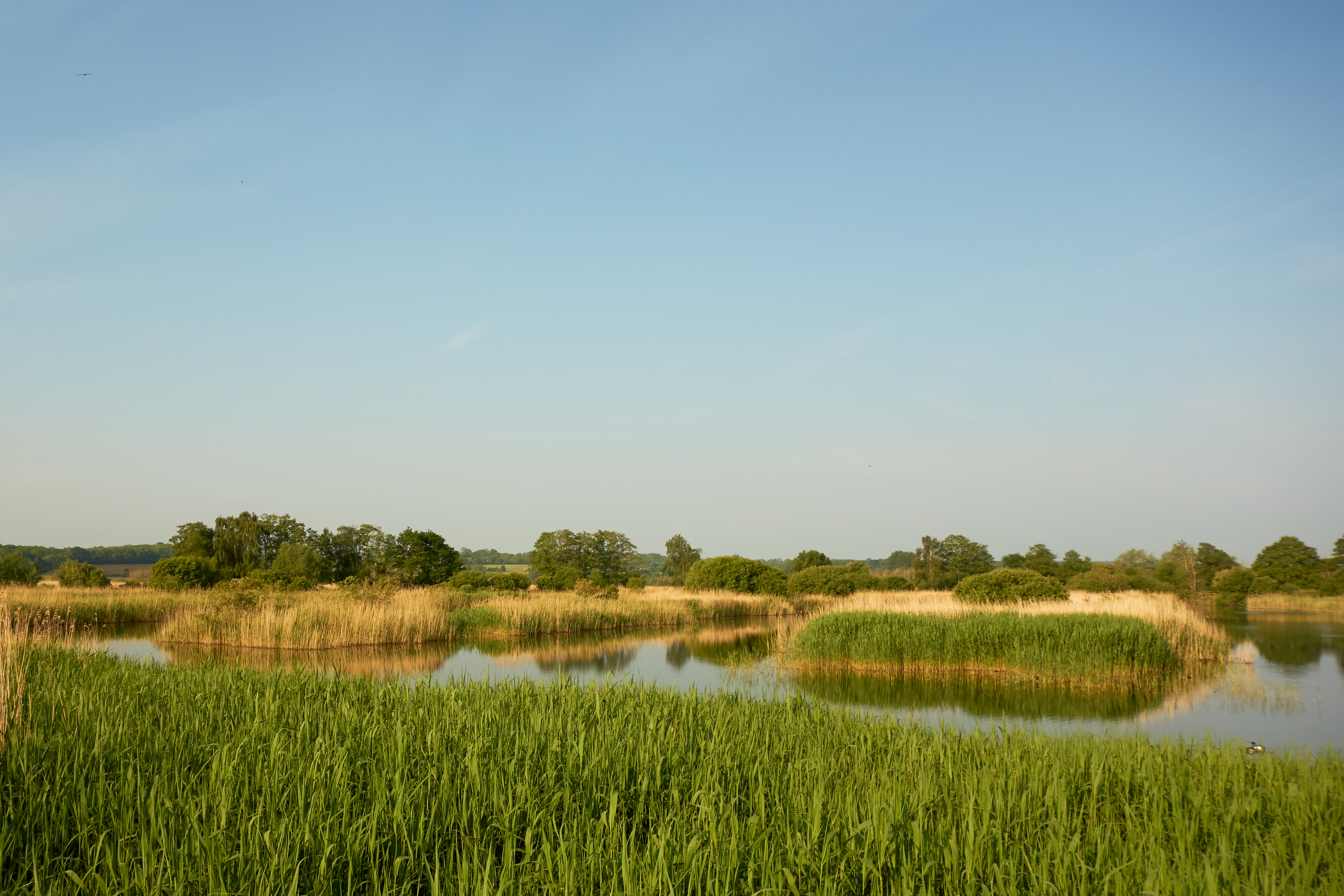
- Looking south across the reserve, with reed beds in the foreground

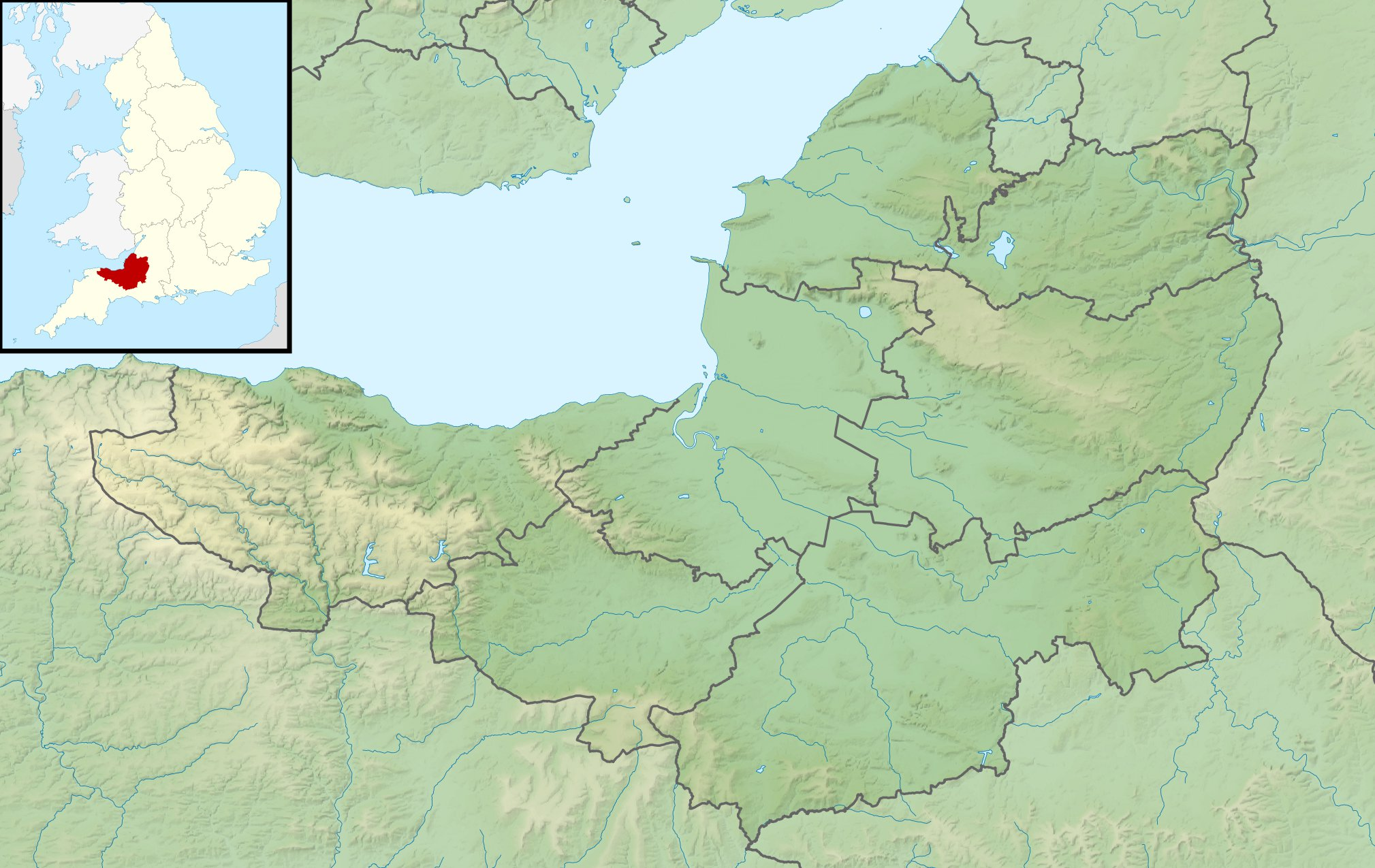
- Location within Somerset
- Location: Somerset, South West, England
- Coordinates: 51°09′18″N 02°46′30″W
- Established: 1994
- Operator: Royal Society for the Protection of Birds
- Website: RSPB page

Ham Wall is an English wetland National Nature Reserve (NNR) 4 kilometres (2.5 mi) west of Glastonbury on the Somerset Levels. It is managed by the Royal Society for the Protection of Birds (RSPB). Since the last Ice Age, decomposing plants in the marshes of the Brue valley in Somerset have accumulated as deep layers of peat that were commercially exploited on a large scale in the twentieth century. Consumer demand eventually declined, and in 1994 the landowners, Fisons, gave their old workings to what is now Natural England, who passed the management of the 260 hectares (640 acres) Ham Wall section to the RSPB.

The Ham Wall reserve was originally constructed to provide reed bed habitat for the Eurasian bittern, which at the time was at a very low population level in the UK. The site is divided into several sections with independently controllable water levels, and machinery and cattle are used to maintain the quality of the reed beds. There are important breeding populations of wetland birds including the rare little bittern and great white egret, and the area hosts several other uncommon animals and plants. The RSPB works with other organisations as part of the Avalon Marshes Partnership to coordinate conservation issues across the Somerset Levels.

The reserve is open year-round, and has nature trails, hides and viewing points. It lies within the Somerset Levels NNR and the Somerset Levels and Moors' Ramsar and Special Area of Conservation site. Potential future threats may result from increasing unpredictability in the UK climate, leading to heavy summer rains and extensive flooding. Sea level rise will make the drainage of the Levels more difficult, and current water pumping facilities may become inadequate.

== Landscape ==
At the end of the last glacial period, about 10,000 years ago, the river valley that would eventually form the Somerset Levels gradually became salt marsh as the melting glaciers caused sea levels to rise. By around 6,500 to 6,000 years ago the marshes had become reed beds interspersed with rhynes (ditches) and open water, and parts of the area were in turn colonised by wet woodland. When the plants died in the oxygen-poor environment they decayed to form peat, and as the layers built up they eventually formed a large raised bog, which may have covered 680 square kilometres (260 sq mi) in Roman times. The formation of the bog was aided by the Somerset Levels' large water catchment area, high rainfall in the Mendips and Blackdown Hills and raised marine clay deposits which restricted drainage to the sea; the same impermeable material underlies the peat, which in places is up to 7.3 metres (24 ft) thick.

== History ==
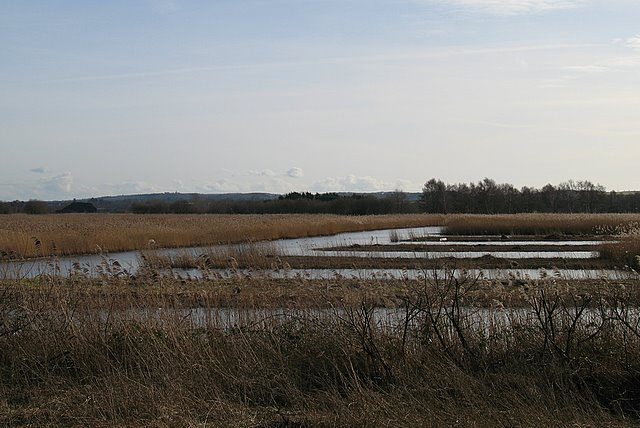
Former peat workings, now part of the reserve

The Somerset Levels have been occupied since the Neolithic period, around 6,000 years ago, when people exploited the reed swamps for resources and started to construct wooden trackways such as the Sweet and Post Tracks, and they were the site of salt extraction during the Romano-British period. Much of the landscape was owned by the church in the Middle Ages when substantial areas were drained and the rivers diverted, but the raised bogs remained largely intact. Only the Inclosure Acts of the 18th century, mostly between 1774 and 1797, led to significant draining of the peat bogs, although the River Brue still regularly flooded the reclaimed land in winter. Following the Somerset Drainage Act 1801 (41 Geo. 3. (U.K.) c. lxxii), parts of the Brue were straightened, and new feeder channels constructed.

The Glastonbury Canal, which runs through the reserve, was opened in 1833. It was made obsolete from 1854 by the Somerset Central Railway line that once ran next to it on its way from Glastonbury to Highbridge. The railway line closed in 1966. The railway and the canal both carried peat and people.

By the twentieth century, large areas of the levels were exploited to meet horticultural demand for peat. The owners of the workings, Fisons, reached an annual production of 250,000 tonnes (250,000 long tons) in the early-1990s. When the demand for peat fell towards the end of the century, Fisons transferred ownership of much of their land to English Nature (now Natural England) in 1994, enabling the creation of 13 square kilometres (5.0 sq mi) of wetland nature reserves from the diggings. English Nature handed the management of 230 hectares (570 acres) at Ham Wall to the Royal Society for the Protection of Birds (RSPB), managing the rest of the land itself apart from an extension to the Somerset Wildlife Trust's existing reserve at Westhay Moor.

The reserve name derives from the Ham Wall rhyne which flows through the site. "Rhyne" is a local name for drainage channels between plots of land, pronounced reens in the east and rhine in the west of the Levels area. "Ham" is an old term for pasture or meadow, and the Ham Wall may have been a bank to hold water on the flooded fields. Ham Walls lies within the Somerset Levels National Nature Reserve and the Somerset Levels and Moors Ramsar and Special Area of Conservation site.

== Reserve creation ==
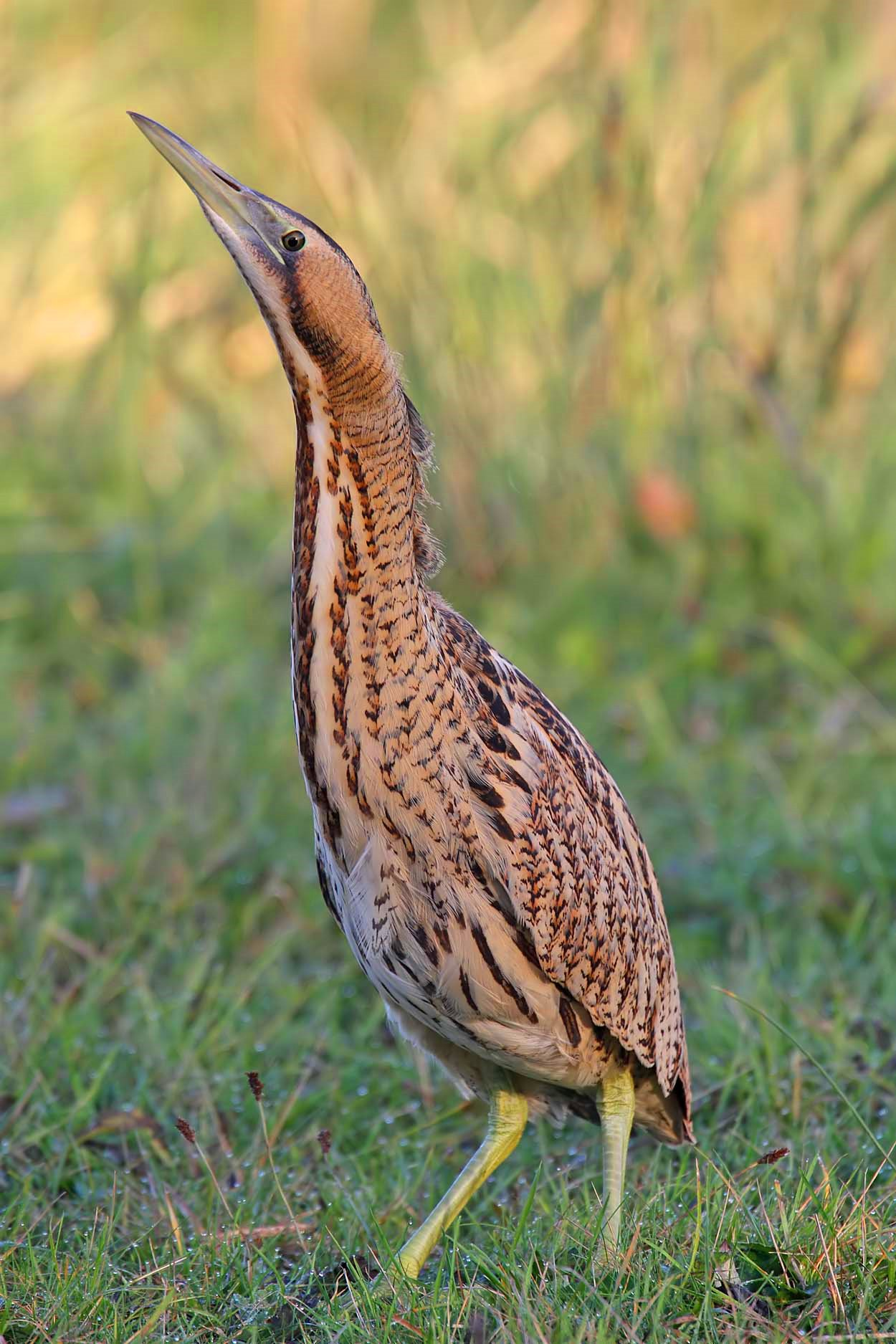
Bittern

The impetus for creating the Ham Wall reserve was the plight of the bittern, with only 11 males present in the UK in the 1997 breeding season. Much of its reed bed habitat was deteriorating, and key coastal sites in eastern England were at risk of saltwater flooding, so an opportunity to create a new inland site was attractive to the RSPB. The peat excavations already had bund walls that allowed the water levels on the reserve to be easily managed in sections, and the workings had removed peat down to the underlying marine clay, a depth of 2 metres (6.6 ft) in this area.

Water levels were managed using sluices, pipes and wind-pumps to create reed beds with about 20% open water, and the ditches were deepened and widened to restrict reed encroachment and provide a habitat for fish, particularly common rudd, introduced to provide food for the bitterns. By the completion of major works in 2013, the 260 hectares (640 acres) reserve contained 220 hectares (540 acres) of reed bed, including 75 hectares (190 acres) of deep water channels and ditches, 10 hectares (25 acres) of wet woodland and 30 hectares (74 acres) of grass, the latter being mainly on the bunds and some higher ground.

Ham Wall, along with Lakenheath Fen in Suffolk, have been a key part of a bittern recovery programme initiated in 1994 as part of the United Kingdom Biodiversity Action Plan. Both reserves created extensive new reed beds, thereby adding significant additional breeding habitat. Initial funding for the recovery scheme was £60,000 from English Nature in 1994, augmented by two rounds of EU funding in 1996–2000 and 2002–2006.

== Access and facilities ==
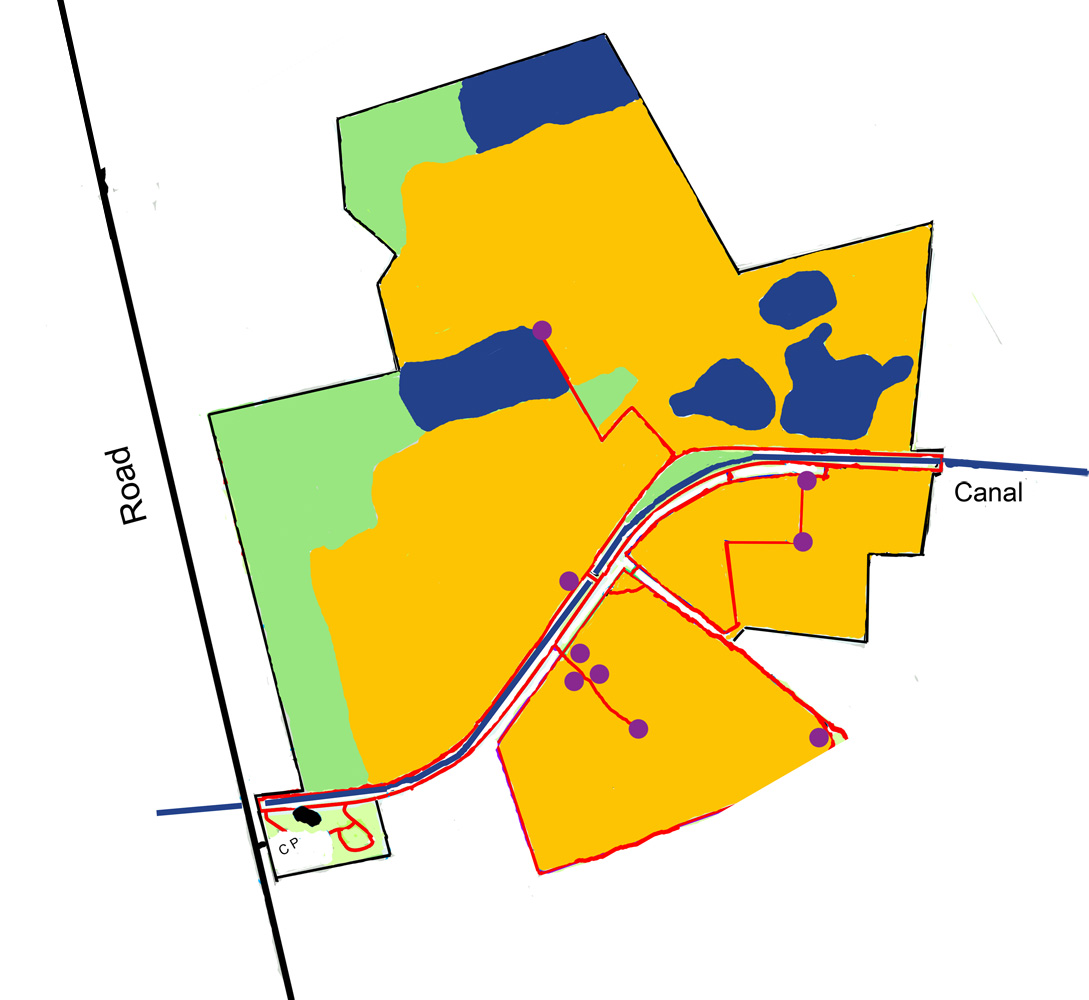
Open water and canal Reedbed and ditches Hides and viewpoints Visitor centre and toilet block Woodland Footpaths

The reserve is about 4 kilometres (2.5 mi) west of Glastonbury and can be accessed by car from the minor road that runs between the villages of Meare on the B3151 and Ashcott on the A39. Route 3 of the Sustrans National Cycle Network runs near the reserve. The nearest bus access is in Ashcott, 4 kilometres (2.5 mi) away, and the railway station in Bridgwater is 15 kilometres (9.3 mi) distant. Natural England's Shapwick Heath NNR is to the west on the opposite side of the Meare-Ashcott road.

The reserve is open and free to enter at all times, although its car park has a charge for non-members of the RSPB and closes at night. There are toilets and a small visitor centre which sells light snacks and is usually open only at weekends. The main access to the reserve on leaving the car park is the Ham Wall loop; this follows the north bank of the canal, crosses at a bridge and returns via a parallel grass track, 2.7 kilometres (1.7 mi) in total. A short spur runs to the Avalon hide from the canal footpath, and two further circular walks 1.7 kilometres (1.1 mi) and 1.3 kilometres (0.81 mi) in length are accessed from the grass track, a section of boardwalk also linking the two trails. There are two bird hides and six viewing platforms or screens on the reserve. Dogs on leads are allowed on the Ham Wall loop (which includes public rights of way), but only assistance dogs can be taken elsewhere. The reserve attracts 70,000 visitors annually.

== Management ==
The main management of the reserve involves cutting the reeds in rotation to rejuvenate the reed beds and prevent their drying out. Two machines are used, an amphibious Truxor tracked reed cutter to harvest wetter areas, and a faster Softrak for islands and where water levels have been lowered. Native breeds of cattle are also used to graze the reed bed margins. The cut reeds are turned into a peat-free compost and sold for domestic use.

The RSPB is one of the members of the Avalon Marshes Partnership, which also includes the Somerset Wildlife Trust, Natural England, the Hawk and Owl Trust, South West Heritage Trust, the Environment Agency and Historic England which work together on conservation issues in the area. Between 2012 and 2016 the scheme was supported by a Heritage Lottery Fund grant of £1,772,500 with additional investment of £920,080 from other sources. The Avalon Marshes Centre, run by Natural England, is near the Ham Wall reserve. The network of reserves and private land managed for conservation in the Avalon marshes means that wetland management can be carried out on a landscape scale. Joint schemes include reed bed management across the area, improved pedestrian and cycle access, and the provision of visitor facilities at Ashcott corner between the Ham Wall and Shapwick Heath reserves.

== Fauna and flora ==
=== Birds ===
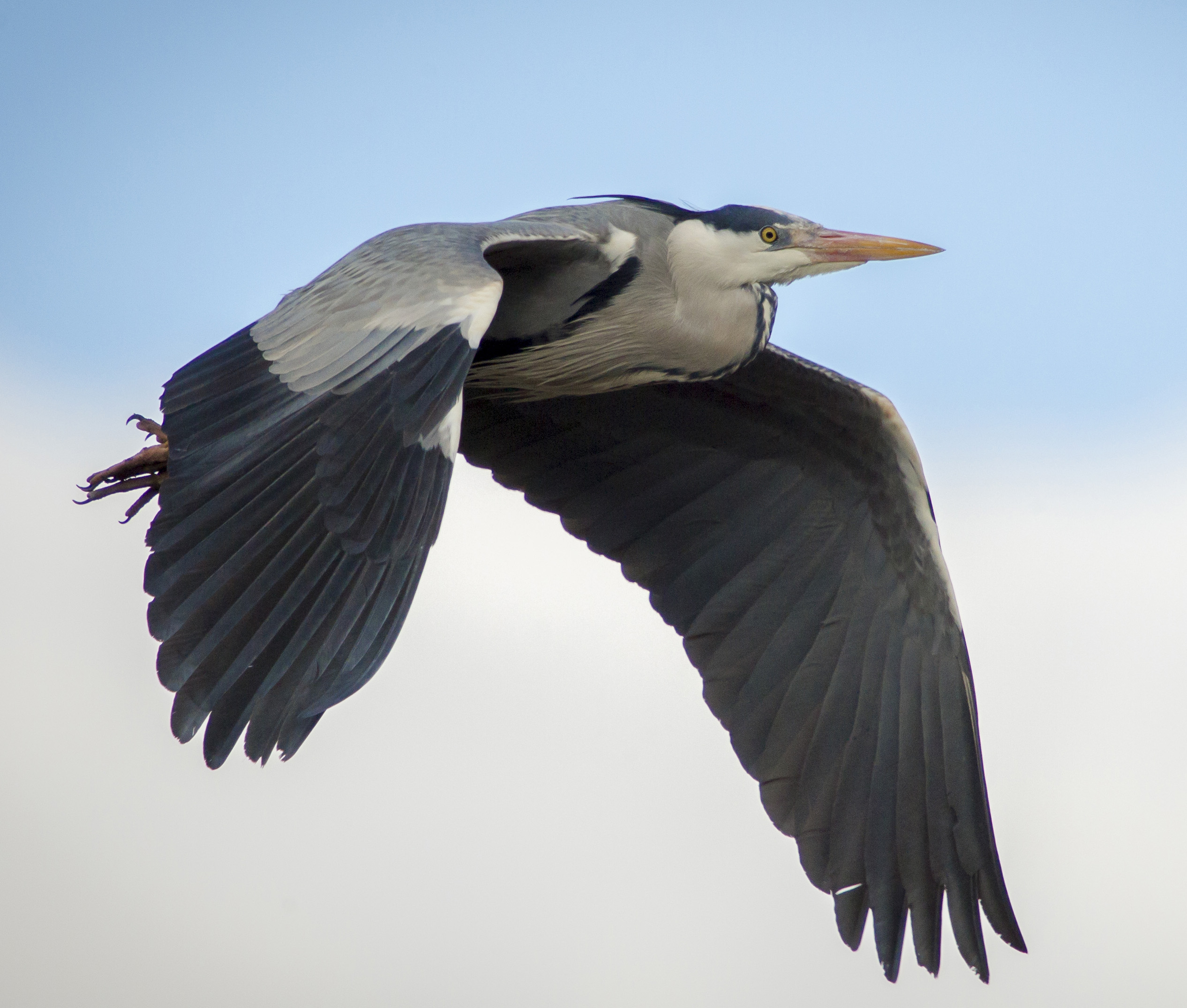
Grey heron at Ham Wall

Following sporadic appearances by males over a number of years, bitterns were first unequivocally proved to have bred at Ham Wall in 2008, and the reserve now typically holds 18–20 breeding males, probably about its maximum capacity, with another 20 males elsewhere in the Avalon Marshes. The reserve has attracted three other heron species that are attempting to colonise the UK. The formerly rare great white egret, first bred in 2012, has nested in small numbers every year since on the reserve and the neighbouring wetlands. The little bittern was present from 2009, bred in 2010, and has been present every year since, although breeding by this reclusive bird is difficult to prove in such a large expanse of reed bed. At least six birds, including four males, were present in spring 2017. The third coloniser is the cattle egret which had bred elsewhere in Somerset from 2008 to 2010. An influx in 2017 led to six pairs attempting to breed at Ham Wall, four successfully, and 30 birds were present in January 2018.

Other typical wetland species include grey herons, some of which nest in the reed beds instead of the more usual trees, garganeys (typically two to three pairs), marsh harriers (three nesting females in 2017), hobbies, bearded tits and Cetti's, reed and sedge warblers. A winter evening roost of common starlings is one of the largest in the UK, and attracts visitors to see hundreds of thousands, sometimes millions, of these birds assemble before descending into the reed bed.

Rare visitors to the reserve in recent years include a collared pratincole and a whiskered tern in 2016, a singing male pied-billed grebe and a squacco heron in 2013, and a blue-winged teal in 2012.

=== Other animals and plants ===
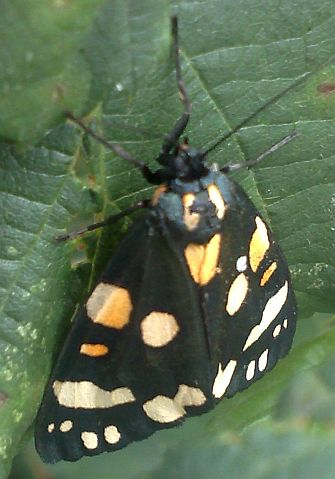
Scarlet tiger moth on the reserve in July 2009

Otters breed on the reserve and two artificial holts have been placed in the reed beds for their use. Water voles can also be found in suitable habitat. Grass snakes, three species of newts, common toads and common frogs are found throughout the Avalon marshes, and non-native marsh frogs occur at Ham Wall and neighbouring Shapwick Heath. A recent intervention has been the construction of a new EDF Energy-funded eel pass to make it easier for European eels to enter the reserve from the nearby River Huntspill and South Drain. The young eels may remain on the reserve for up to 20 years before returning to the sea to breed.

Invertebrates found in the wetland include several nationally uncommon aquatic molluscs including the shining ram's-horn snail and the depressed river mussel. Insects include the purple hairstreak, silver-washed fritillary and scarlet tiger moth, although the marsh fritillary, narrow-bordered bee hawk-moth and large marsh grasshopper have been lost to the area since the mid 1990s, suggesting some conservation issues. 19 species of dragonflies and damselflies have been recorded at Ham Wall, including a roost of thousands of four-spotted chasers. The lesser silver water beetle occurs in the wet woodland, and the very rare leaf beetle Oulema erichsoni was noted in 2015.

Apart from the common reed that dominates the marshes, restricted-range plants found in the Brue valley wetlands include rootless duckweed, marsh cinquefoil, water violet, milk parsley and round-leaved sundew.

== Threats ==
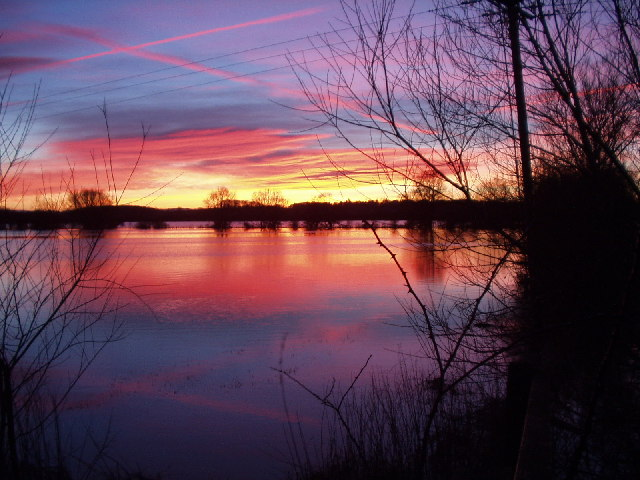
Flooding on the Levels in 2003

Greater unpredictability in the UK climate may lead to heavy summer rains which would adversely affect ground-nesting birds, invertebrates and other wildlife. Although this inland site is not directly threatened by saltwater incursion in the same way as east coast reserves like RSPB Minsmere and Titchwell Marsh, sea level rise will make the drainage of the Somerset Levels more difficult and current water-pumping facilities may become inadequate.

Despite Environment Agency planning, recent significant river flooding events occurred on the Levels in November 2012 and following Cyclone Dirk in winter 2013–2014, the latter leaving 6,900 hectares (17,000 acres) of agricultural land under water for over a month. Further flooding occurred in the winters of 2023/4 and 2025/6.

The risk of flooding was increased historically by the drainage of the peat soils, leading to soil shrinkage and a lower surface. More recently, cultivation of maize has led to soil loss, since the ground is largely exposed while the crop is growing, and left clear in the winter, leading to loss of soil in heavy rain, again lowering the surface and polluting the waterways with excess nutrients, soil and pesticides.

Water-based sports and recreation elsewhere in the Levels could possibly enable non-native species to invade the wetlands, and the number of visitors to the area can cause congestion on local roads, particularly those coming for the winter evening starling roost.

== Cited texts ==
- Body, Geoffrey; Gallop, Roy (2001). The Glastonbury Canal. Fiducia Press. ISBN 978-0-946217-08-3.
- Havinden, Michael (1982). The Somerset Landscape. The making of the English landscape. Hodder and Stoughton. ISBN 978-0-340-20116-9.
- Natural England (2010). Shapwick Heath National Nature Reserve. Natural England. Download
- Natural England (2013). NCA Profile:142 Somerset Levels and Moors. Vol. NE451. Natural England. ISBN 978-1-78367-008-6. Download
- Somerset Wildlife Trust (2012). Avalon Marshes Landscape Partnership – Project Information (PDF). Somerset Wildlife Trust.
- Williams, Michael (1970). The Draining of the Somerset Levels (1 ed.). Cambridge University Press. ISBN 978-0-521-07486-5.
- Williams, Robin; Williams, Romey (1992). The Somerset Levels. Ex Libris Press. ISBN 978-0-948578-38-0.
