= British hardened field defences of World War II =

World War II defences in the United Kingdom

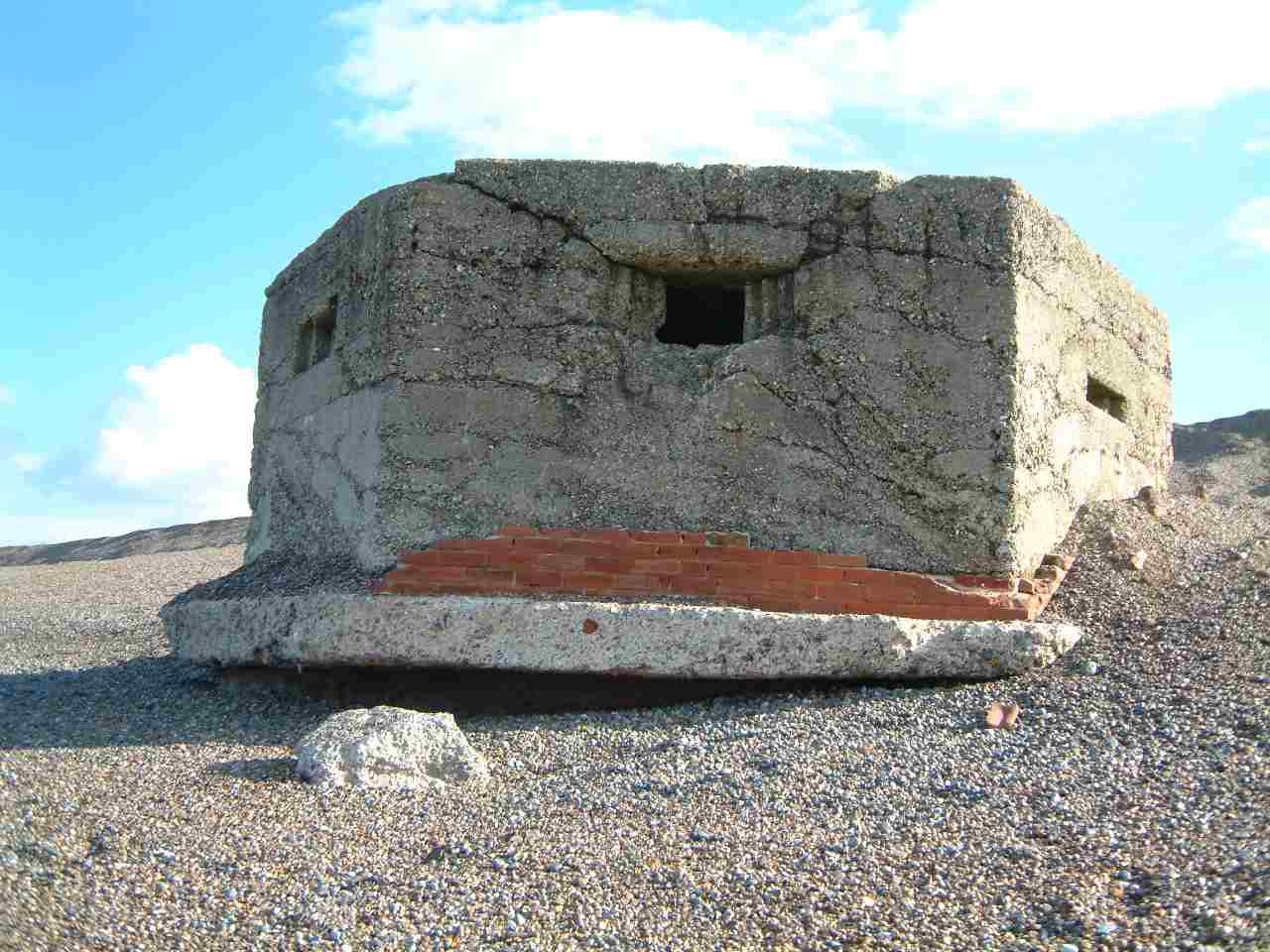
Hexagonal pillbox (Type 22)

British hardened field defences of World War II were small fortified structures constructed as a part of British anti-invasion preparations. Included in the definition of "hardened field defences" are the structures popularly known as pillboxes, a reference to their shape as well as other concrete weapon emplacements such as anti-tank emplacements.

== Background ==
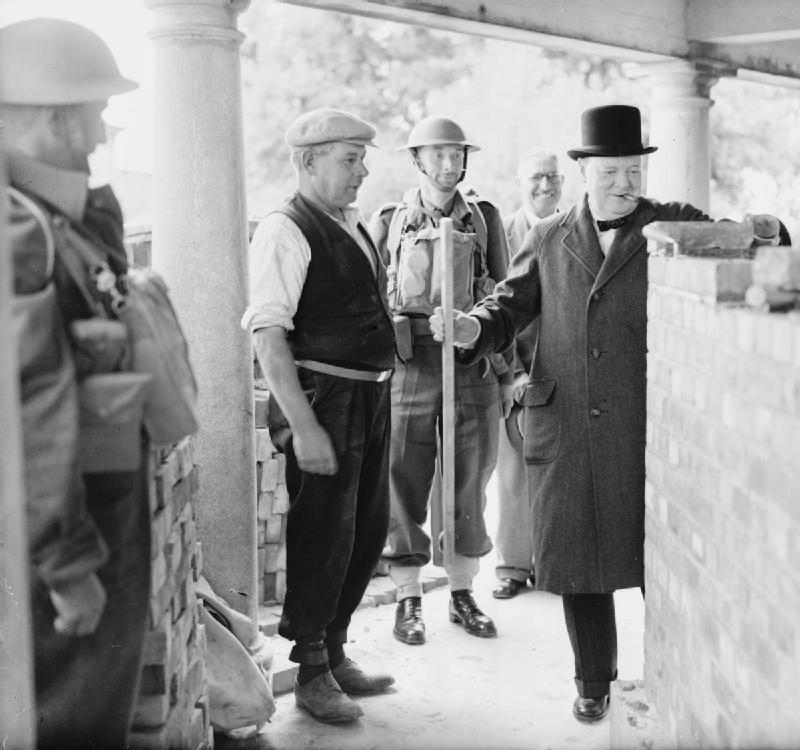
Winston Churchill helps to build a pillbox at Sandbank Pavillion, Poole in July 1940.

With the German invasion of Low Countries in May 1940 came the realisation that the United Kingdom was vulnerable to invasion. Late in May 1940, the Chiefs of Staff Committee decided that vulnerable beaches needed to be fortified with pillboxes and anti-tank obstacles. This proposal was resisted by the Commander-in-Chief, Home Forces, Sir Walter Kirke, who favoured a mobile reserve to counter invasion, but shortly afterwards, he was replaced by Sir Edmund Ironside. Having very few tanks or lorries to form such a reserve, Ironside formulated a plan to have a "coastal crust" of defended beaches, backed up by a network of "stop lines" which would limit any incursion, with localised defences for "vulnerable points" such as airfields. Work on these defences continued through the summer of 1940, until in late July, Ironside was replaced by Sir Alan Brooke. By then, there were more resources for mobile defence and work on fixed defences became a lower priority, especially the stop lines which Brooke disliked. In February 1941, British General Headquarters issued an order that no more pillboxes were to be constructed. By then, some 28,000 hardened field defences had been constructed; about 25 per cent of these have survived.

== Design and development ==
In May 1940, the directorate of Fortifications and Works (FW3) was set up at the War Office under the direction of Major-General G. B. O. Taylor. Its purpose was to provide a number of basic but effective pillbox designs that could be constructed by soldiers and local labour at appropriate defensive locations. In the following June and July, FW3 issued six basic designs for rifle and light machine gun, designated Type 22 to Type 27. In addition, there were designs for gun emplacements suitable for either the Ordnance QF 2 pounder or the Hotchkiss 6pdr gun (designated Type 28) and a design for a hardened medium machine gun emplacement.

There were also designs for pillbox-like structures for various purposes, including light anti-aircraft positions, observation posts and searchlight positions to illuminate the shoreline. In addition, the Air Ministry provided designs of fortifications intended to protect airfields from troops landing or parachuting. These would not be expected to face heavy weapons so that the degree of protection was less and there was more emphasis on all-round visibility and sweeping fields of fire. Many of these were later reinforced.

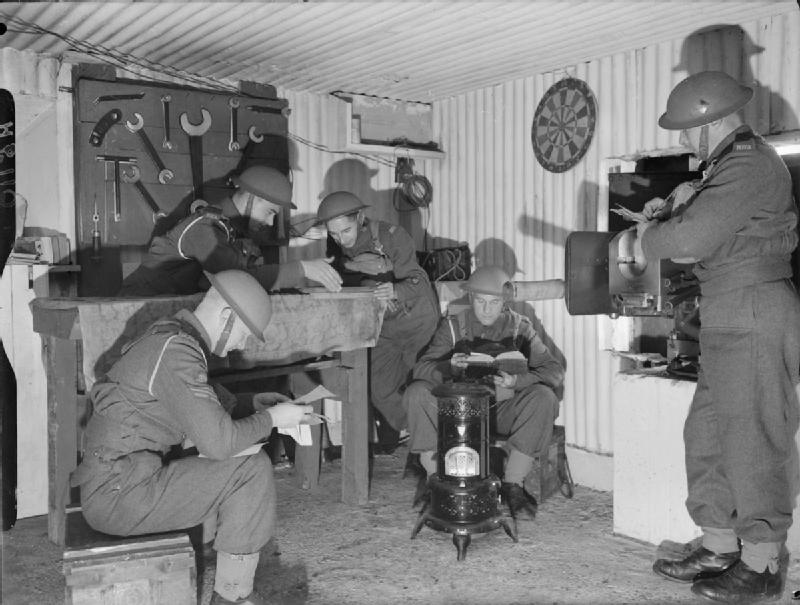
Soldiers relax inside a Type 28 pillbox in October 1940.

Embrasures were available precast and factory produced to standard designs, but as these were in short supply some embrasures were improvised from brick or concrete paving. Embrasures were frequently fitted with a steel or concrete-asbestos shutter. From March 1941, some pillbox embrasures were fitted with a Turnbull mount: this was a metal frame that supported a medium machine gun.

The degree of protection offered by a pillbox varied considerably: the thickness of the walls and roof generally varied from just 12 in to 3 ft 6 in (0.3 to 1.1m) or more although the commercially produced designs were often much thinner. In March 1940, General Brooke carried out penetration trials and recorded that a 25 mm anti-tank gun could easily penetrate up to 2 feet (60 cm) of reinforced concrete. Despite such results, the thick-walled pillboxes were designated as shell-proof, whereas the thinner-walled pillboxes were designated as bulletproof.

Internally, pillboxes are generally cramped and spartan. Some internal concrete shelves and tables were provided to support weapons and some were whitewashed inside. Only the Type 28s provided a little space—sufficient for a few home comforts.

== Adaptations ==
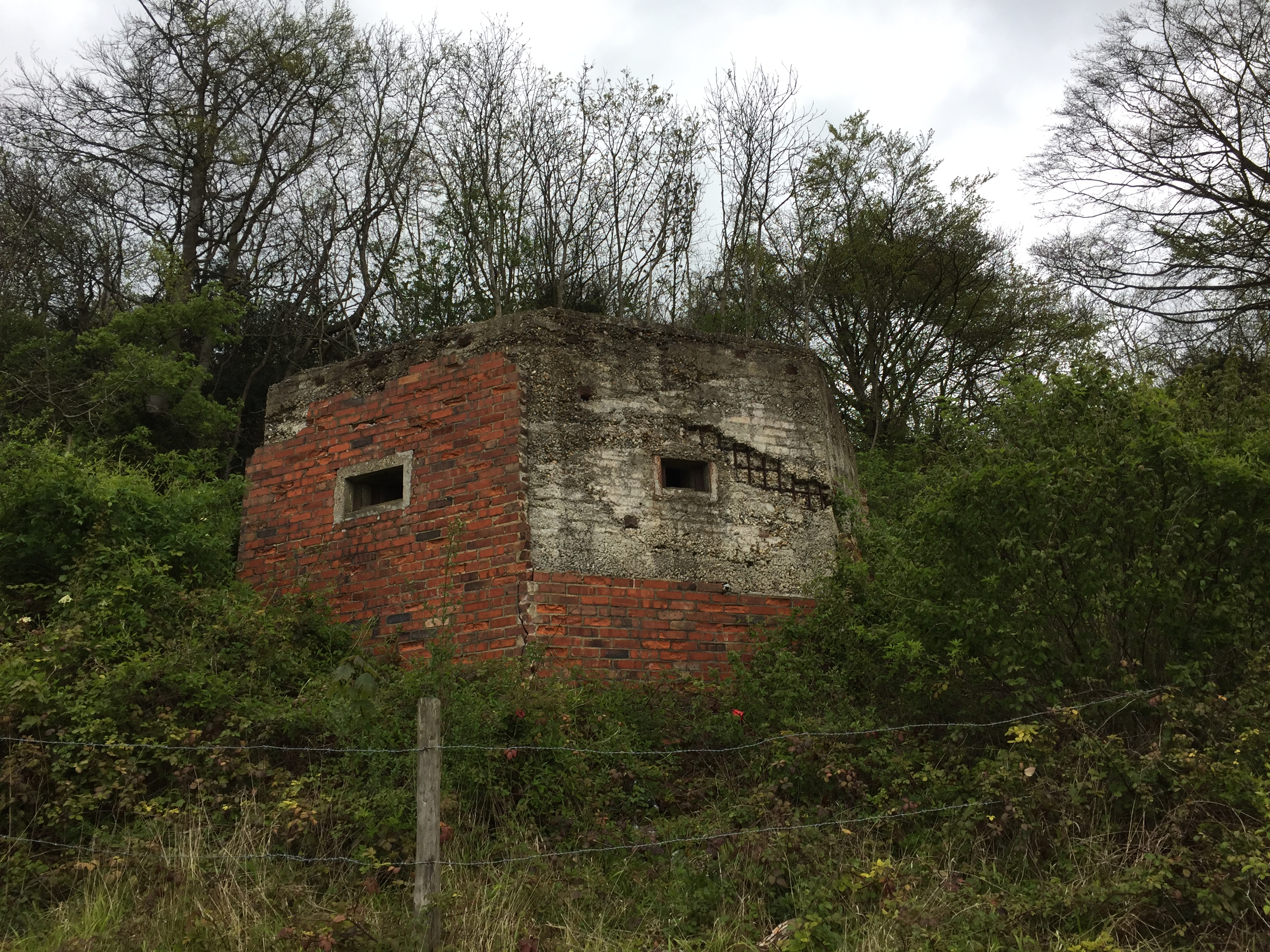
Pillbox where some of the original brick shuttering and reinforced concrete has fallen away to reveal the internal network of rebars.

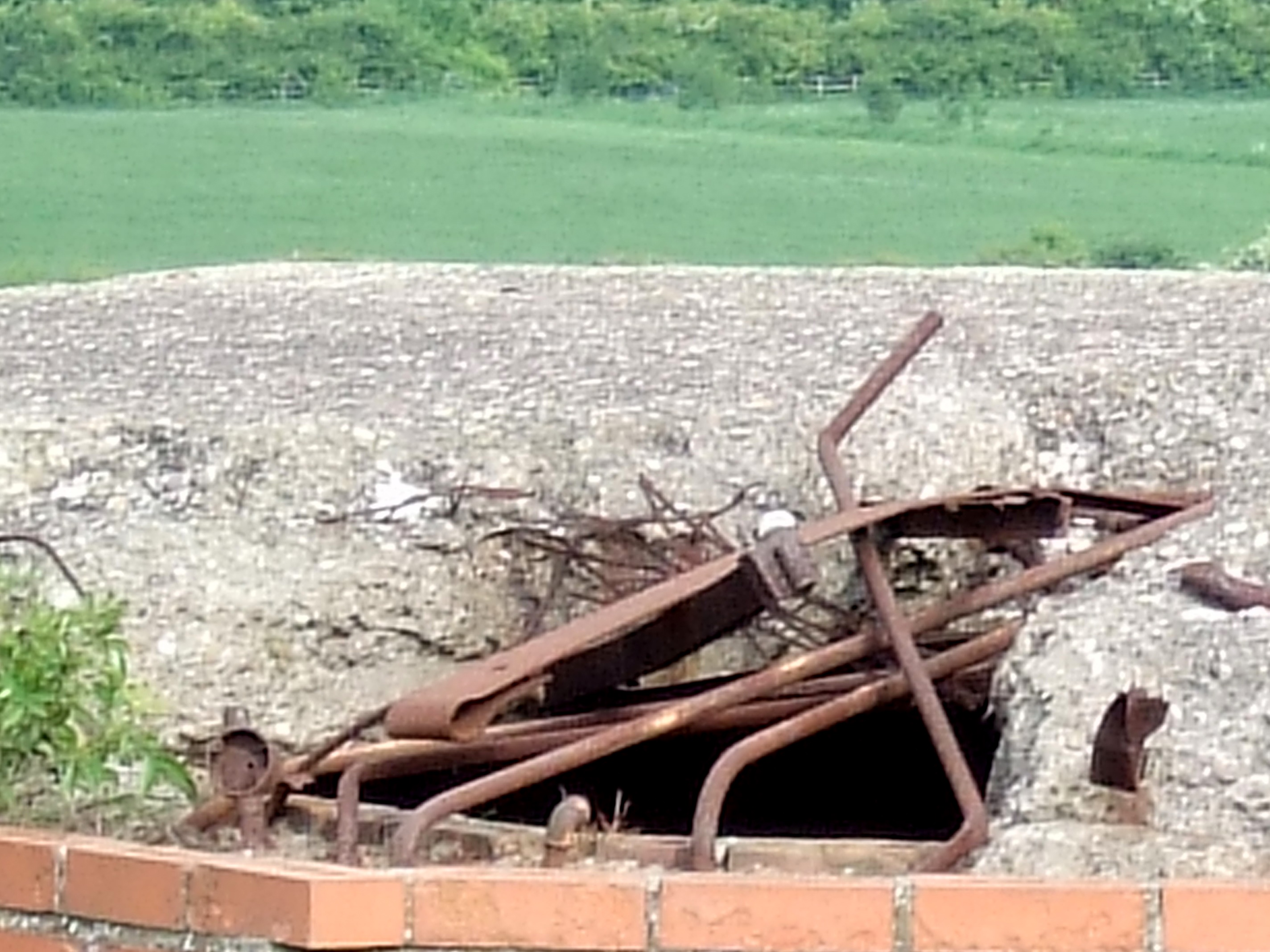
Pillbox at Gotham, Nottinghamshire, close-up. Scrap metal was used in construction.

The basic designs were adapted to local circumstances and available building materials such that, outwardly, two pillboxes of the same basic design could look quite different. The height of a pillbox could vary significantly according to local needs: some were half buried so that the embrasures might be as low as ground level, others were raised up to give a better view; those built into hillsides might lack embrasures on some walls; the entrance could be moved and its size varied as might be convenient and there may be additional walls to protect the entrance, a free standing blast wall or a steel door.

Appearance also varied due to the building materials used, although all the FW3 designs are formed from reinforced concrete. Where brick was used as a shuttering, the bricks essentially formed a mould into which concrete was poured, the bricks being left in place. Otherwise, the pillbox was formed using shuttering of wood (usually planks, but sometimes plywood) and/or corrugated iron. Wood shuttering was removed, whereas corrugated iron was sometimes left in place. Construction often took advantage of whatever materials were available locally (for example, at the coast, beach sand and pebbles would be used), and this expedient use of local materials had the added advantage of aiding camouflage. The reinforced concrete used in construction was generally conventional, making use of thin steel rebars with floor, walls and roof all mutually bonded. However, several instances are known where scrap metal had been used such as parts of an old bed or park railings.

Local commanders introduced modifications to the standard FW3 designs or introduced designs of their own, which were sometimes produced in some numbers and in other instances were completely ad hoc designs suited to local conditions. Other designs were produced as commercial ventures. Finally, there were a small number of pillboxes that had been constructed in the first world war.

== FW3 pillbox types ==
The approximate numbers of extant pillboxes of each type are given based on data from the Defence of Britain database, records from County HERs and submissions to the UK Pillbox Study Group.

=== Type 22 ===
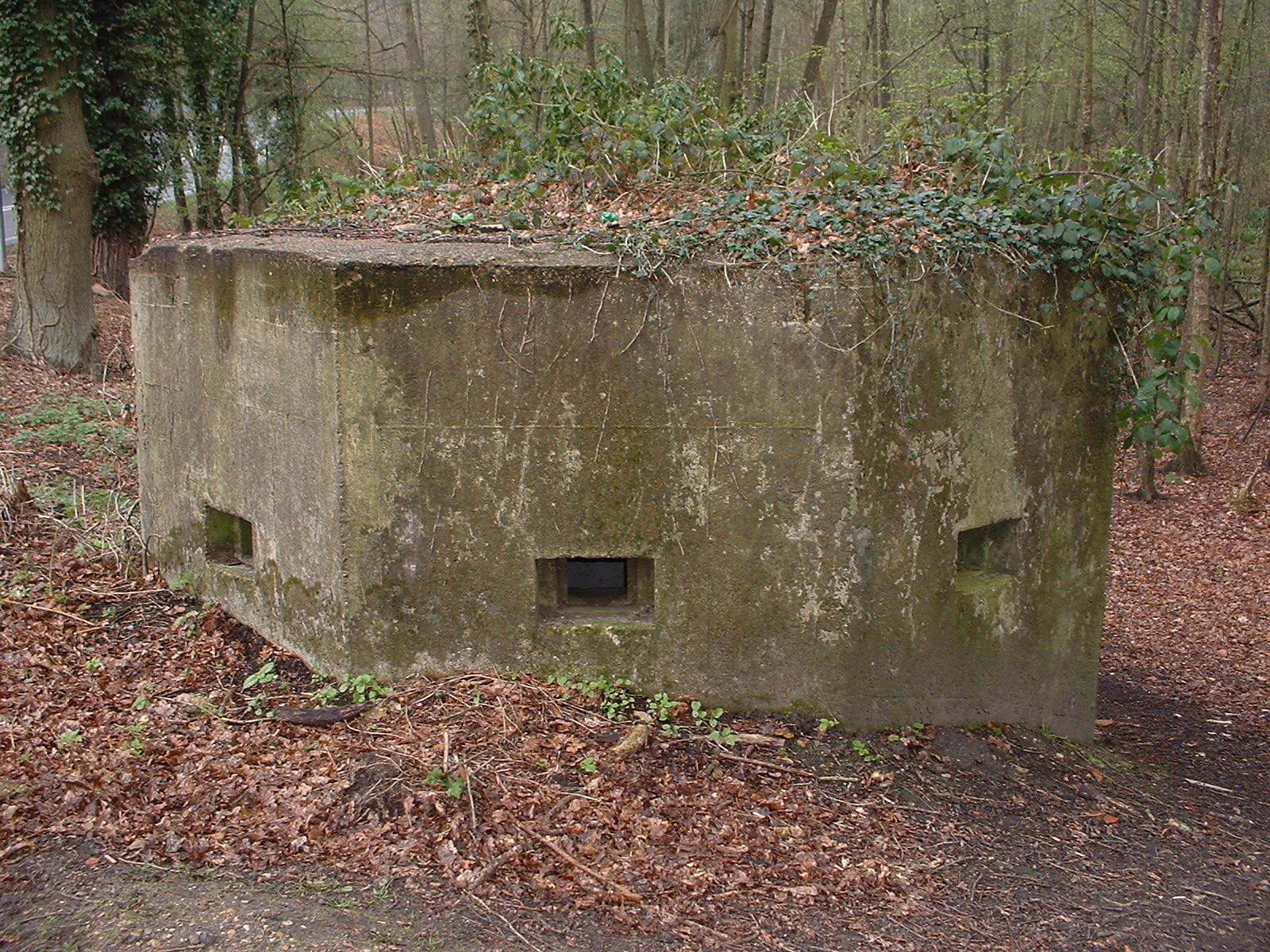
Extant example of a bulletproof version at Curzon Bridges near Pirbright, Surrey. SU920561.

Horizontal section of a bulletproof version at the level of the embrasures; note the regular hexagonal shape.

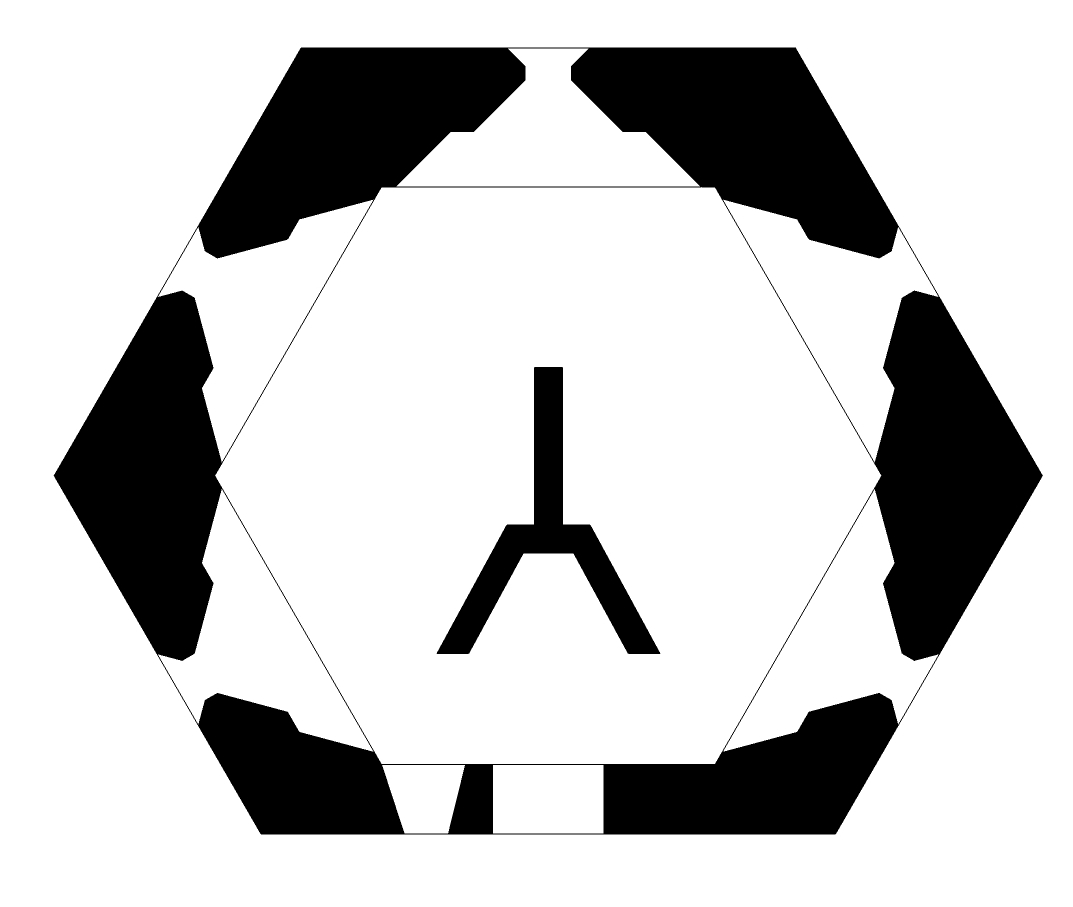
Plan of a Type 22 thick-walled version commonly found in Oxfordshire. Note that the rear wall is not thickened to save concrete and allow for the rear embrasure, which gives this version the superficial appearance of a Type 24.

The Type 22 pillbox is a regular hexagon in plan with an embrasure in five of the sides and an entrance in the other. The embrasures are suitable for rifles or light machine guns. Some have a low entrance that allows an extra embrasure above. Each wall is about 6 feet (1.8 m) long and it was generally built to the bulletproof standard of 12 inches (30 cm) thick, although shellproof versions with walls around 40 inches (1.0 m) thick were also built such as the granite and concrete examples on the Cowie Line in Kincardineshire and along the upper Thames in Oxfordshire. Internally, there is a Y- or T-shaped anti-ricochet wall (the top of the Y/T nearest the entrance); the internal wall also helps support the roof.

The Type 22 is the second most common pillbox type with 1,347 recorded as being extant. It is easily confused with the common Type 24, which is an irregular hexagon, and the less common octagonal.

=== Type 23 ===
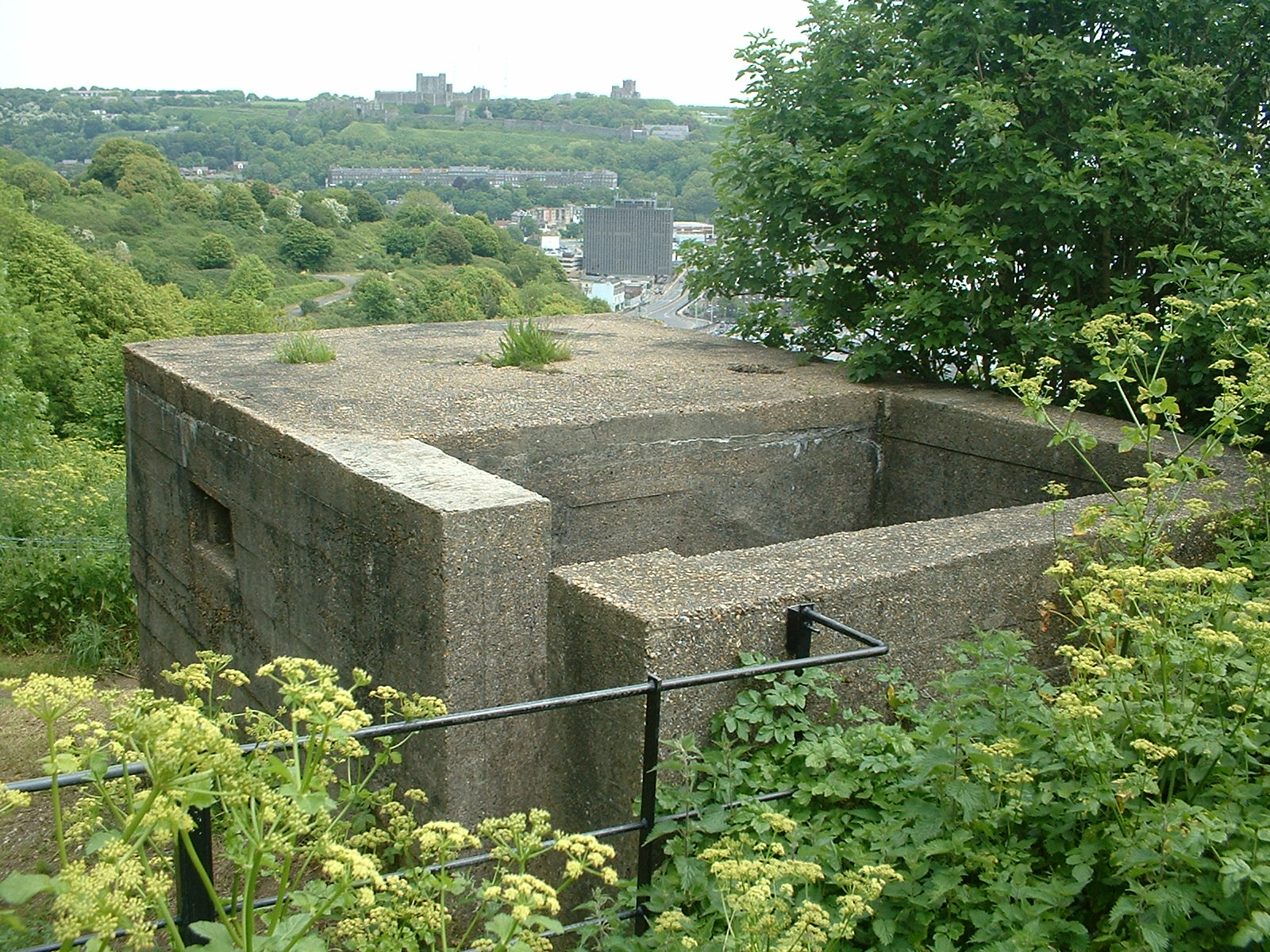
Extant example of a FW3/23 variant at St Martin's Battery, Western Heights, Dover. TR313409.

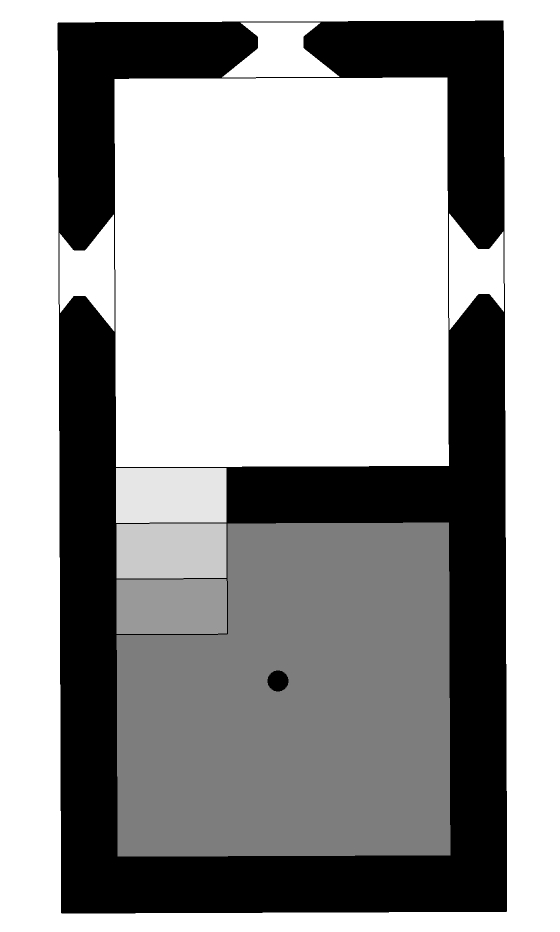
Standard FW3/23 with 3 embrasures and no anti-ricochet wall.

Variant FW3/23 with 4 embrasures and an internal anti-ricochet wall.

Pillbox type FW3/23. Note rectangular plan featuring a roofed fighting compartment and an open anti-aircraft compartment (grey).

The Type 23 pillbox is rectangular in plan – essentially two squares, one of which is roofed and the other open – with embrasures in each of the available sides of the covered section. The embrasures are suitable for rifles or light machine guns. The open section was for a light anti-aircraft defence: a Bren or Lewis gun on a mounting. Usually, there is no ground-level entrance: to get in, one had to climb over the wall into the open section and then pass through a door to the covered section. The walls were 8 feet (2.4 m) wide by 16 feet (4.9 m) long and usually built to a bulletproof standard of 12 inches (30 cm) thick.

The Type 23 is uncommon; 87 are recorded as being extant. A further variant exists in Lincolnshire consisting of a double-chambered type 23 with an access door with anti-aircraft gun mount and a chamber on either side, known as the Lincolnshire three bay.

=== Type 24 ===
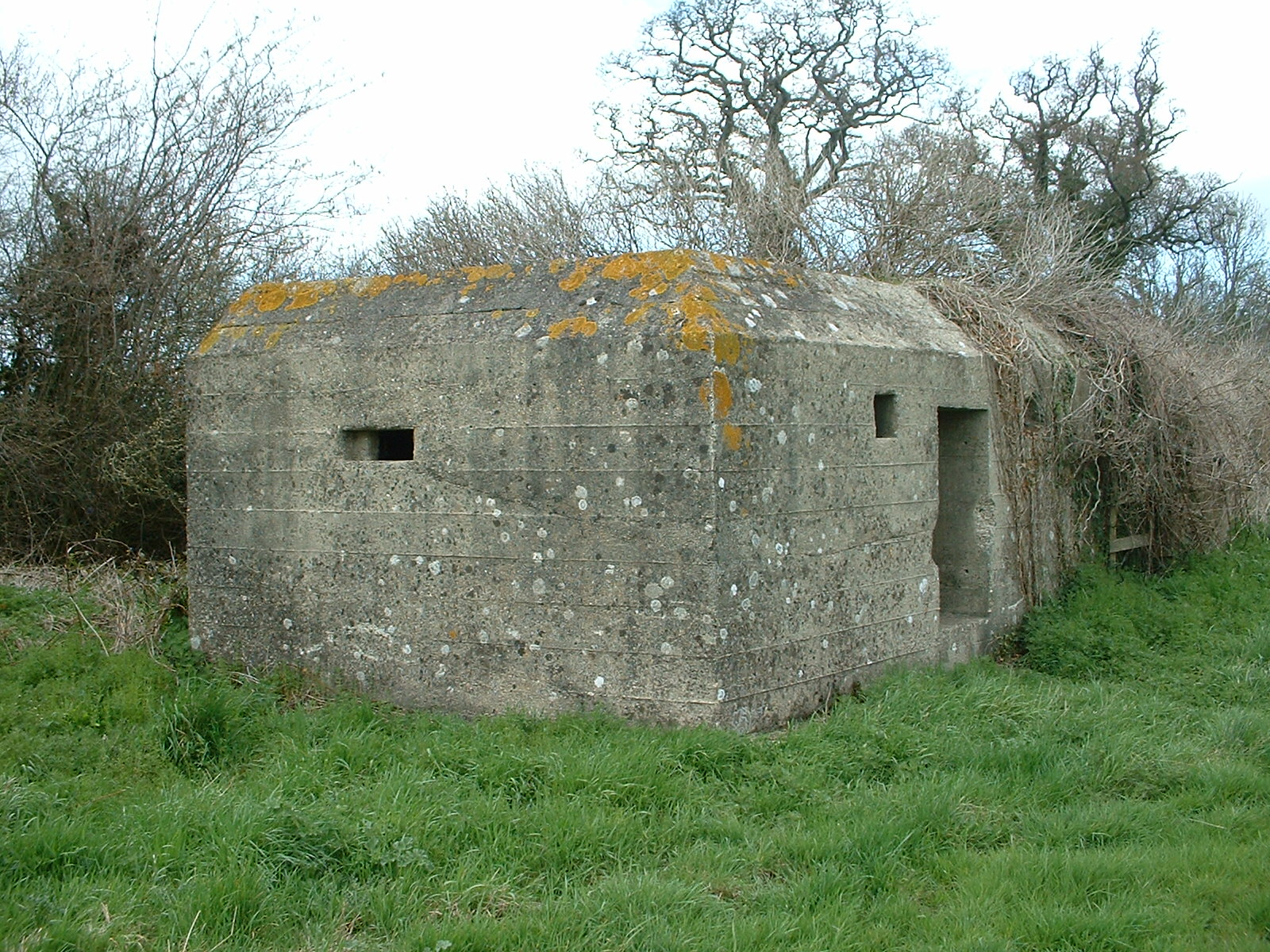
Extant example near Donyatt in Somerset. ST342131. A part of Taunton Stop Line.

Horizontal section at the level of the embrasures.

Pillbox Type FW3/24 built to shellproof standard. Note irregular hexagonal plan and Y-shaped internal anti-ricochet wall.

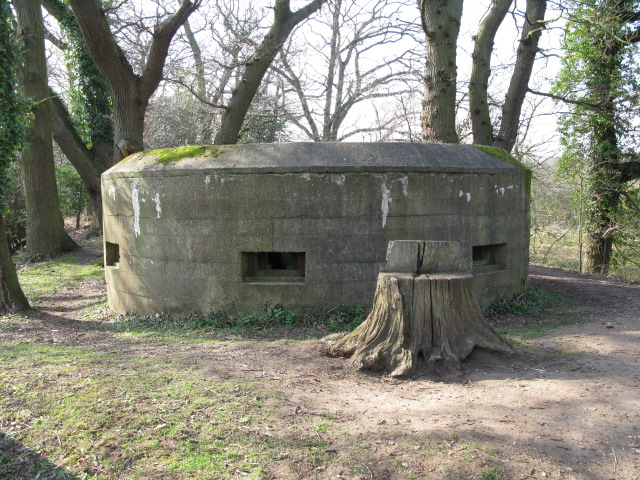
Example of a Mowlem Drum on the River Wey near Chilworth.

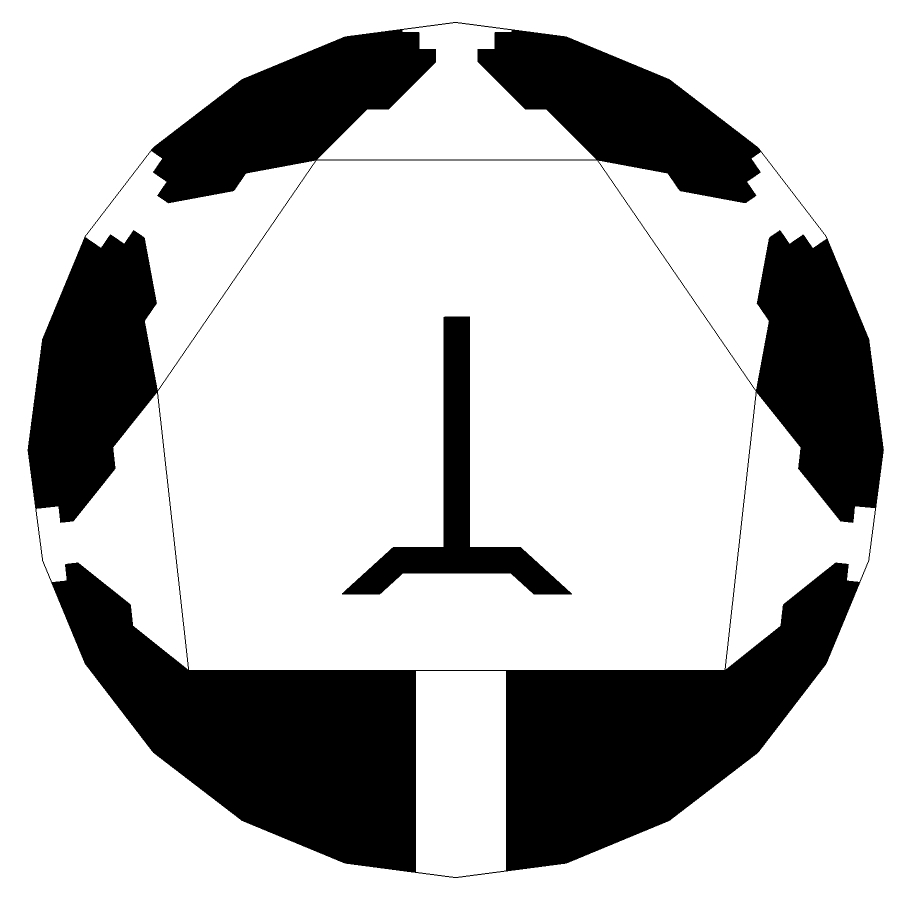
Horizontal section at the level of the embrasures.

Type FW3/24 built by Mowlems using circular external Shuttering.

The Type 24 pillbox is an irregular hexagon in plan. The rear wall is the longest at about 14 feet (4.3 m); this has the entrance with an embrasure on either side. The other walls vary from 7–8 feet (2.2–2.5 m), each having a single embrasure. The embrasures are suitable for rifles or light machine guns. Internally, there is a Y-shaped anti-ricochet wall (the top of the Y nearest the entrance); the internal wall also helps support the roof. The Type 24 was always built to at least a bulletproof standard of 12 inches (30 cm) thick, but often was thicker.

A thick-walled variant was introduced to a shellproof standard; it was larger externally and had walls 36–50 inches (91–127 cm) thick. This thick-walled variant is sometimes called a Type 29 by pillbox researchers, but this is not an official designation. In a variant on the Scottish Command Line, the entrance was moved from the long wall and the two rifle embrasures were increased in size to allow a Bren and Boys Anti-tank rifle to be mounted side by side.

An unusual local variant of the Type 24 can be found along the River Wey in Surrey between Godalming and Albury. Known as a Mowlem Drum after the contractor that built them, these are Type 24s that have had circular external shuttering used to produce very thick walls. Internally, they are identical to a standard Type 24. Most are fully circular, but some still have the flat rear wall of a normal Type 24, allowing the two rear embrasures to be present. There are 25 examples of this type still extant.

The Type 24 is the most common type, with more than 1724 recorded as being extant.

=== Type 25 ===
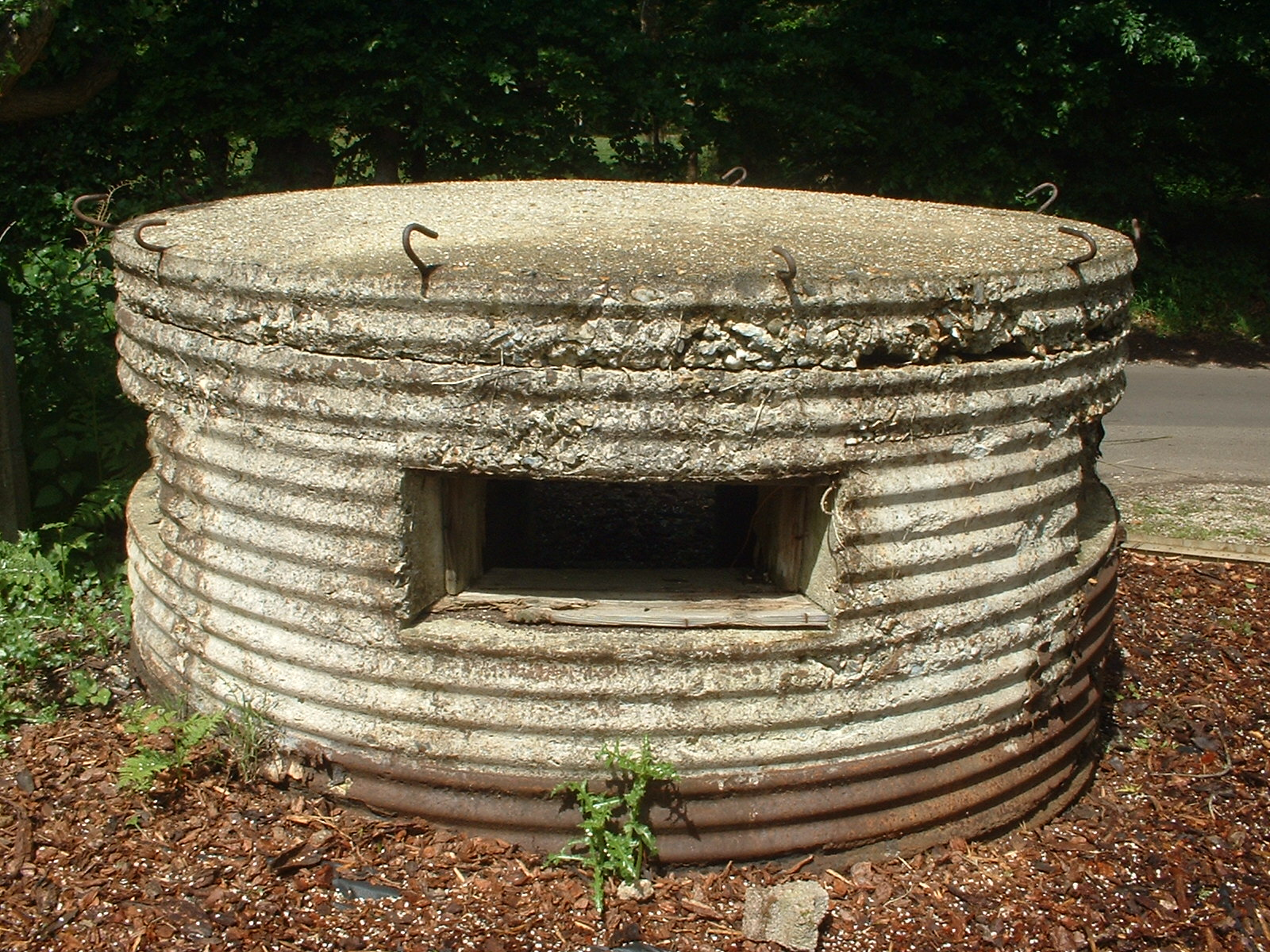
Extant example at Sheephatch Lane near Tilford, Surrey. SU872446. A part of GHQ Line.

Horizontal section at the level of the embrasures.

Pillbox Type FW3/25, horizontal section at the level of the embrasures. Note simple circular plan.

The Type 25 pillbox is the only FW3 design that is circular, with a diameter of 8 feet (2.4 m). The walls were just 12 inches (30 cm) thick with no internal walls. There were three embrasures suitable for rifles or light machine guns and a small entrance like a low window. This design was made from reinforced concrete shuttered by corrugated iron; this gave the design the popular name Armco after the manufacturer of corrugated iron of that name.

The Type 25 is rare: about 30 are recorded as extant.

=== Type 26 ===
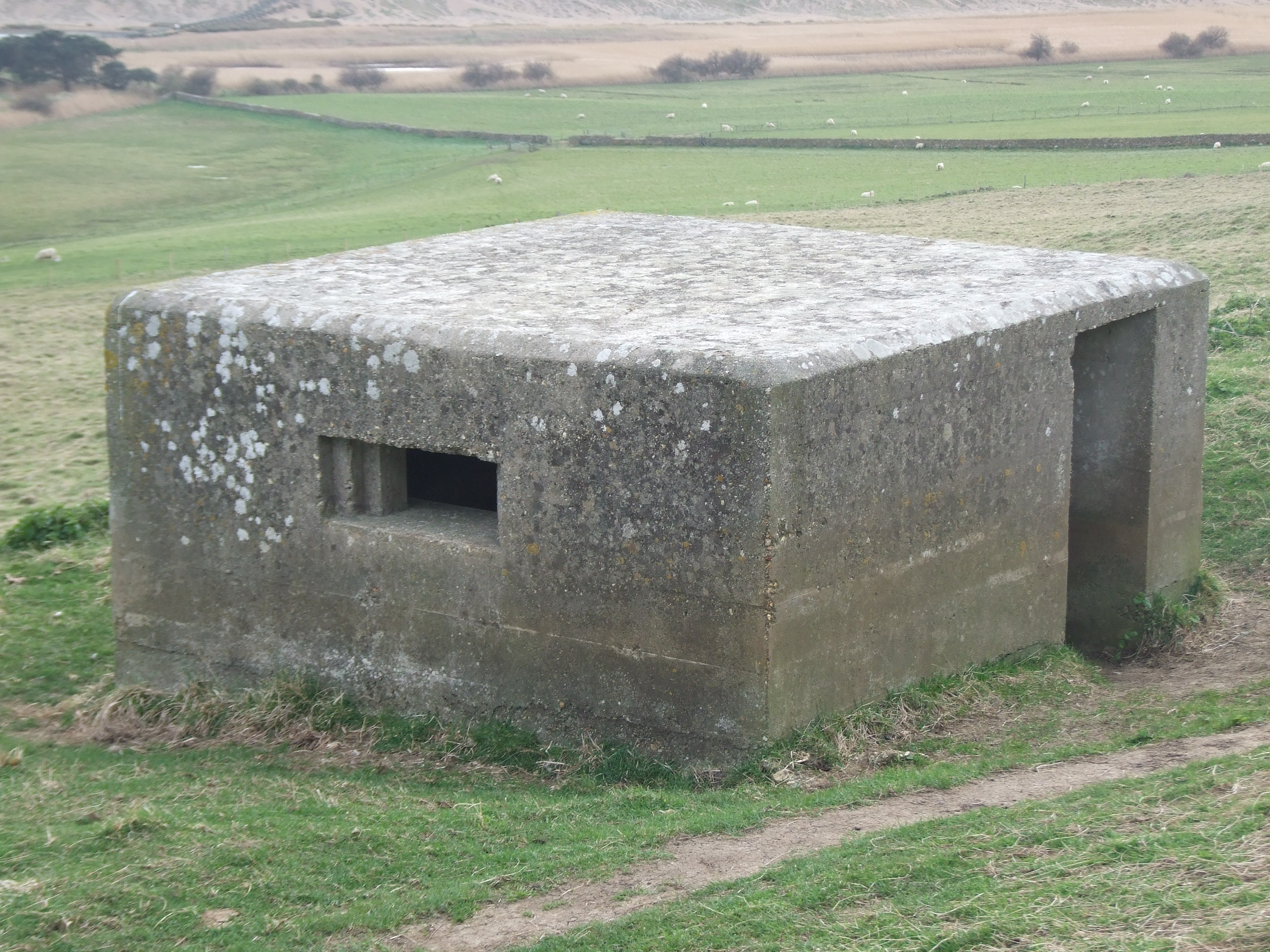
Extant example near St Catherine's Chapel near Abbotsbury in Dorset. SY572845. A part of the Coastal Crust.

Horizontal section at the level of the embrasures.

Pillbox Type FW3/26. Note simple square plan.

The Type 26 is a simple square in plan, each wall being 10 feet (3 m) long. There is a door on one side and embrasures in each of the remaining three walls, with, possibly, an additional embrasure next to the door. There are no internal walls. Occasionally, there are two embrasures in one of the walls. The embrasures are suitable for rifles or light machine guns. Walls are normally constructed to bulletproof standard at about 18 inches (46 cm) thick.

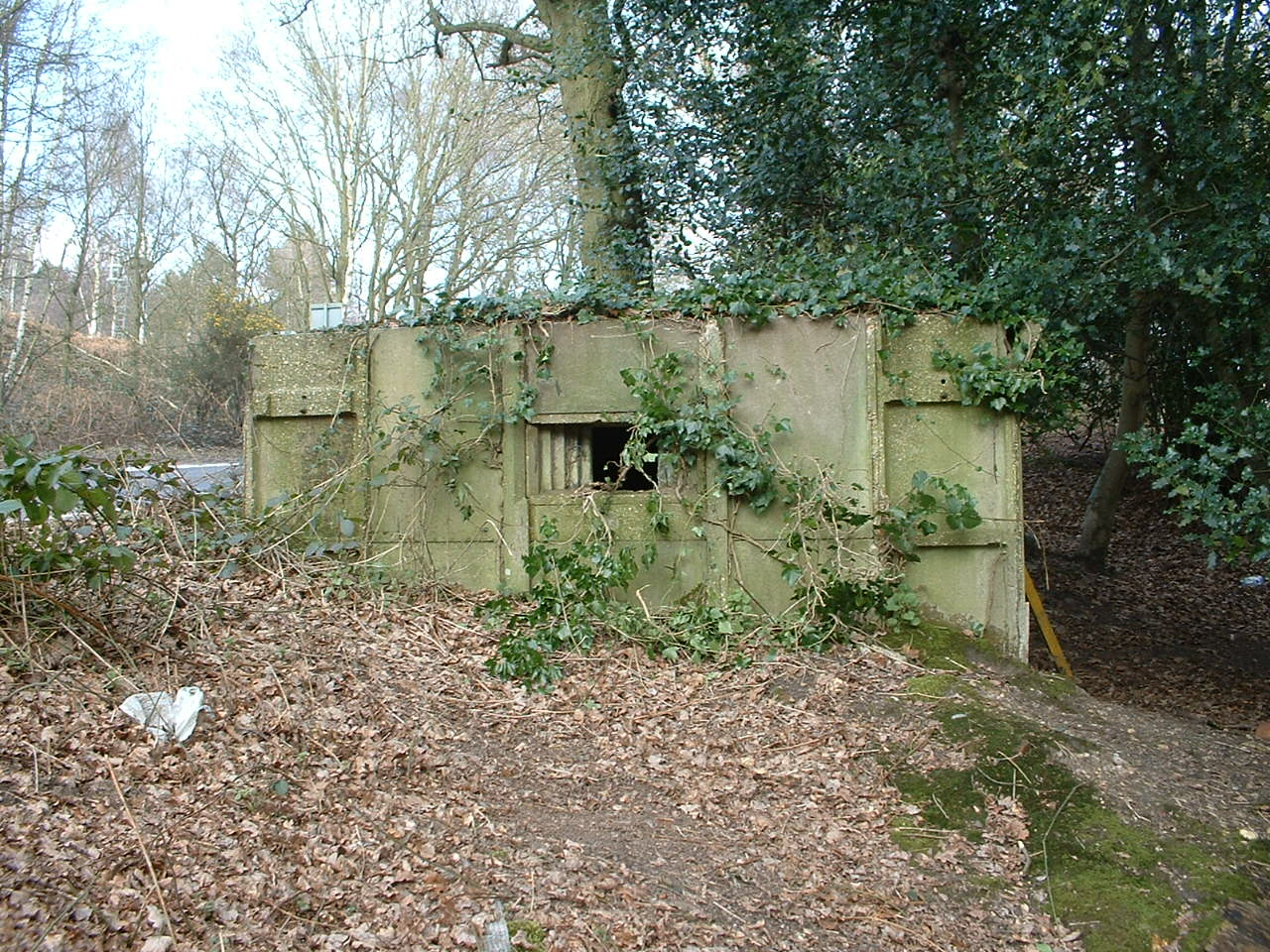
Pillbox type FW3/26, prefabricated construction.

The Type 26 also had an important prefabricated variant, in which the shuttering – both inside and out – was provided by precast concrete slabs slotted into reinforced concrete posts. The shuttering was filled with concrete in situ. This pillbox was also known as the 'Stent' after the company that produced the prefabricated components, Stent Precast Concrete Limited. In those examples where damage allows inspection of the construction, it seems that the concrete fill was not reinforced.

The Type 26 is uncommon: 140 are recorded as extant, including the Stent prefabricated type.

=== Type 27 ===
Horizontal section of octagonal version at the level of the embrasures.

Pillbox Type FW3/27 built to shellproof standard. Note regular octagonal plan with central compartment with a slightly raised platform open to the sky for anti-aircraft weapon (grey) and heavily protected entrance

The Type 27 is one of the largest of the FW3 designs. It is octagonal in plan with walls between 9 ft 9 in and 11 ft 6 in (3.0–3.5 m). The outer walls are 36 inches (91 cm) thick and have embrasures suitable for rifles or light machine guns on each facet. It has a central well open to the sky that could be used as a light anti-aircraft position.

Type 27 is uncommon; 84 are recorded as extant.

=== Type 28 ===
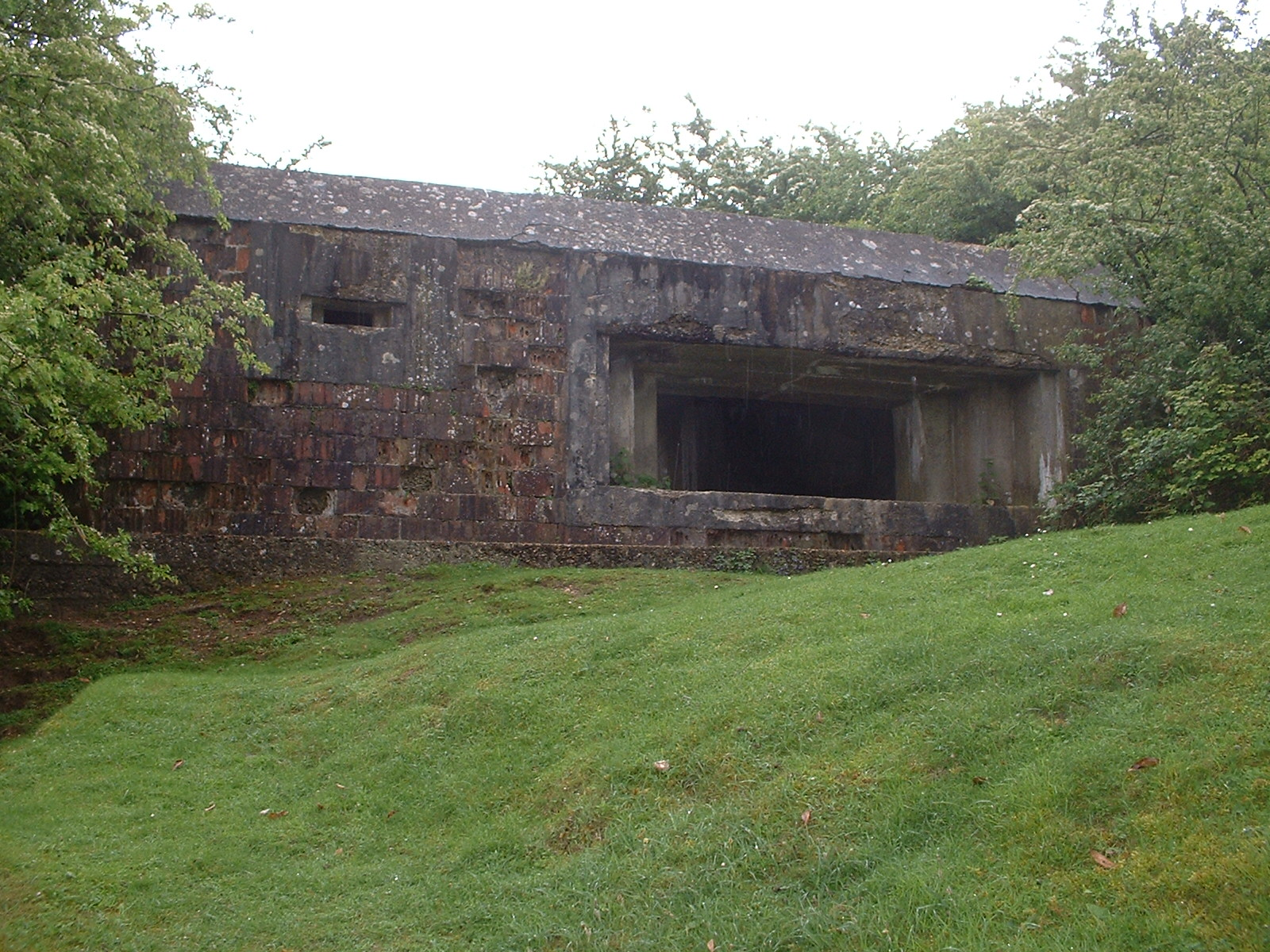
Extant example at Dun Mill Lock on the Kennet and Avon Canal, near Hungerford, Berkshire. SU350681. A part of GHQ Line

Horizontal section at the level of the embrasures

Pillbox FW3/28A built to shell proof standard. Note rectangular plan with large embrasure and a separate rifle or light machine gun fighting compartment.

The Type 28 is the largest of the FW3 designs and the only one with a specific anti-tank capability. It is almost square in plan, with the forward-facing corners chamfered. The walls are about 20 by 19 feet (6.1 by 5.8 m) long, constructed to shell-proof specification at about 42 inches (107 cm) thick. There is a very large forward embrasure. It was designed to take a 2 pounder anti-tank gun or a Hotchkiss 6pdr gun. The gun shield of the artillery piece would largely fill the aperture. There are usually embrasures suitable for rifles or light machine guns in each of the two side walls.

Superficially, the Type 28 resembles the smaller Vickers MMG emplacement, but the aperture is much larger, and there is a very large rear entrance designed for ease of wheeling the gun in and out.

The Type 28A is an important and common variant – it is more common than the unmodified Type 28. It is wider than the Type 28 to allow for a side area for an infantry chamber, giving a forward-facing embrasure suitable for a rifle or light machine gun. This resolved the problem of the Type 28 being vulnerable to a head-on infantry attack.

On parts of the GHQ line in Surrey, there are a number of pillboxes that are an infantry variant of the Type 28. These are the same size and shape as a Type 28 but have the main embrasure replaced with a Bren gun embrasure, Bren gun embrasures in the side walls and a rifle embrasure in the rear wall.

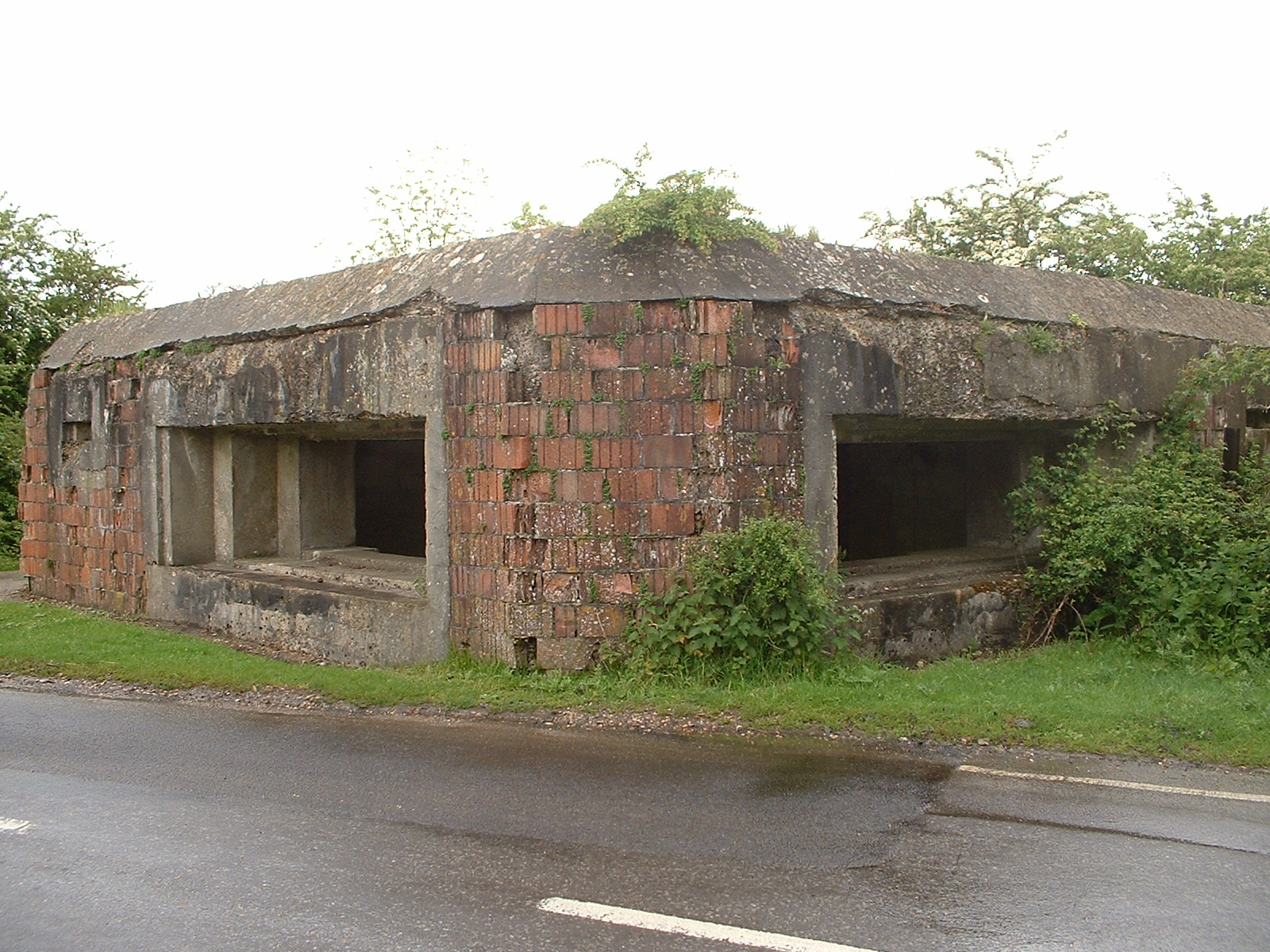
Pillbox type FW3/28A twin.

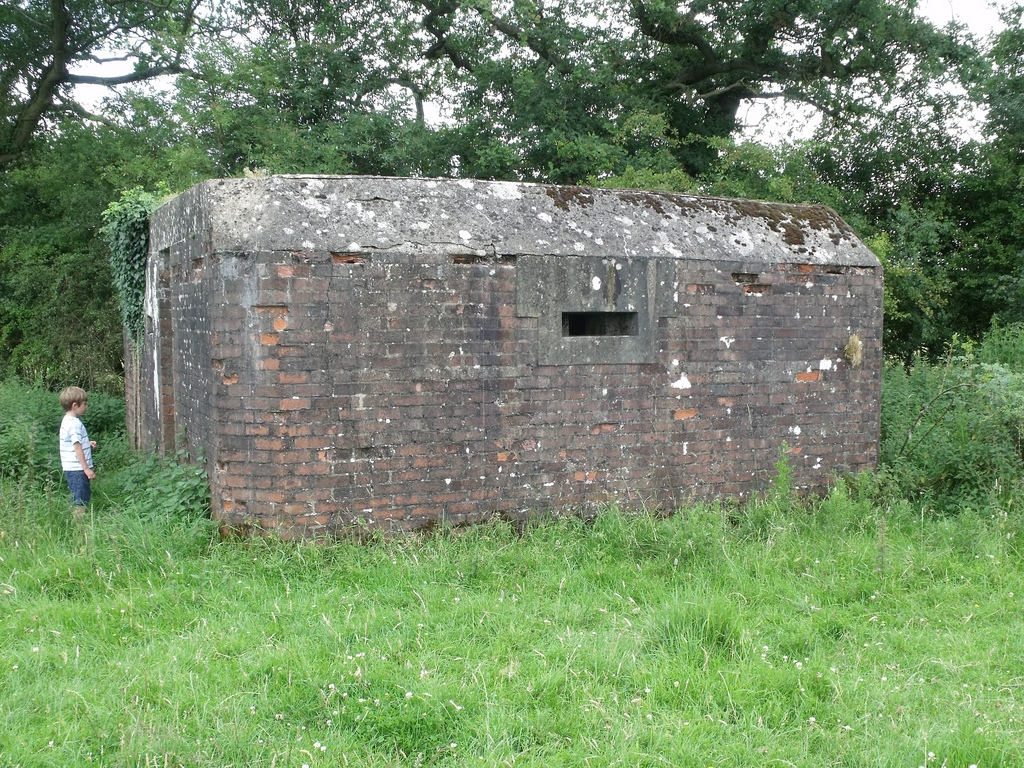
Type 28 Infantry variant on the GHQ line in Surrey.

A further rare variant is the Type 28A twin, which has two main gun embrasures on adjacent walls, giving two possible firing positions for the one main gun together with two adjacent infantry chambers. These are mainly concentrated in the Sulham valley, where attack could have come from both the south and west.

The traverse of the gun was limited to about 60°. Generally, these pillboxes were positioned to fire along fixed lines, such as enfilading fire across an anti-tank ditch or at a bridge, and in such positions the limited traverse of the gun creates no real disadvantage; whereas the small size of the embrasure provides greater protection for the gun and its crew.

The Type 28 and its variants are fairly common: there are 78 Type 28s, 209 Type 28As and 19 Type 28 twins recorded as extant.

=== Vickers MMG emplacement ===
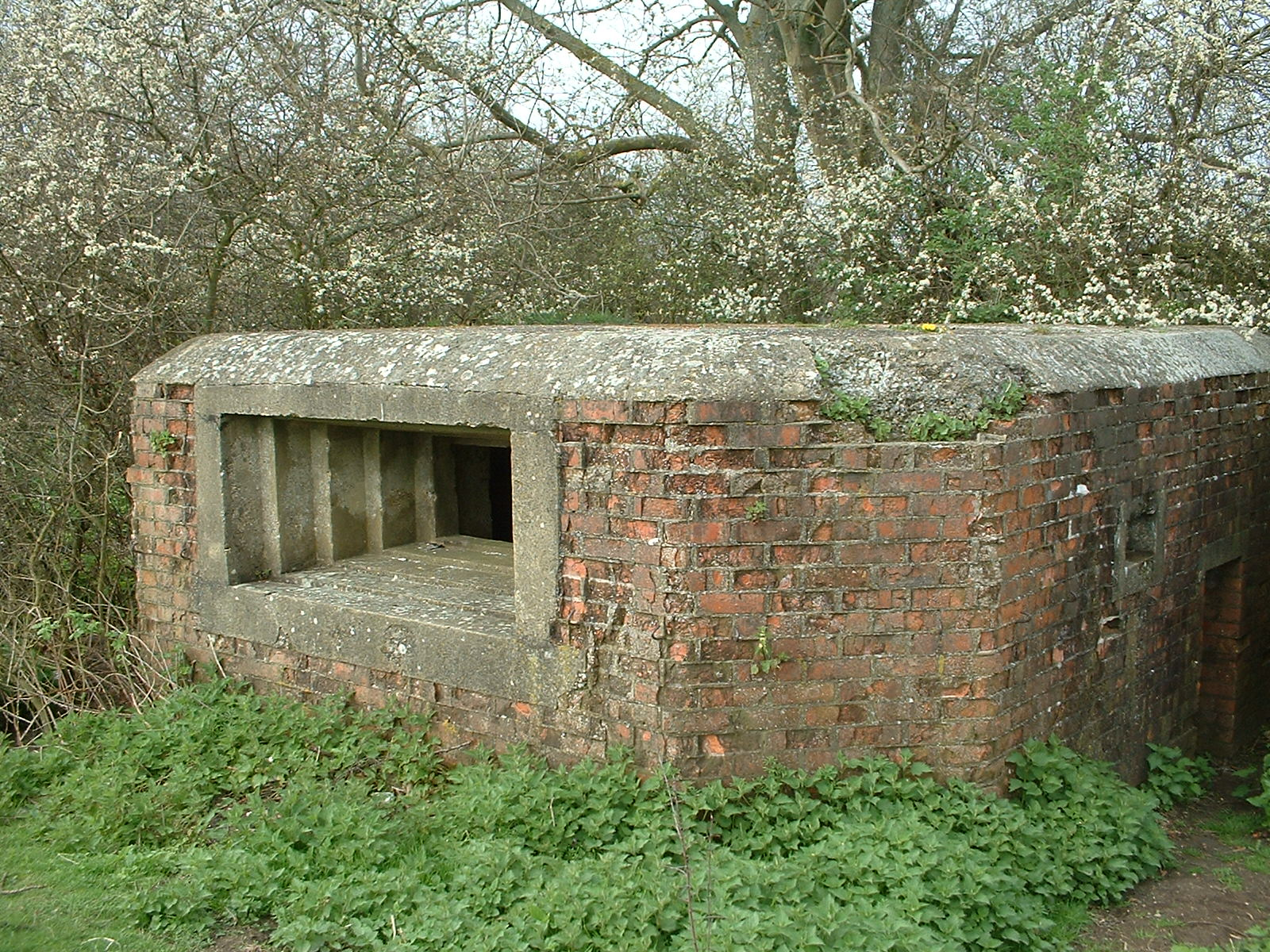
Extant example at Poulters Bridge on the Basingstoke Canal near Crookham Village, HampshireSU796515. A part of GHQ Line.

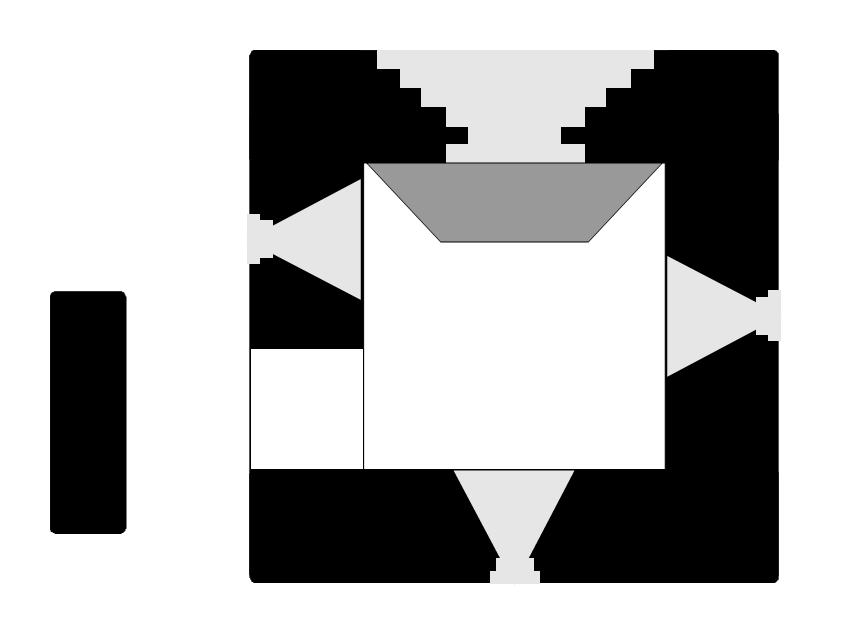
Horizontal section at the level of the embrasures.

Vickers Machine Gun Post. Note approximately square plan with one large embrasure, a trapezoidal table (grey) and a free standing anti-ricochet wall protecting the entrance.

The Vickers machine gun pillbox is essentially square in plan with the forward-facing corners chamfered. The walls are 14 feet (4.3 m) long and there is generally a freestanding blast wall covering the entrance on either the left or right side. The walls were constructed to shellproof standard of 36 inches (91 cm). There are no internal walls. There is a large embrasure and inside is a concrete, trapezoidal table on which to mount the weapon's tripod. The other walls would each have an embrasure suitable for a rifle or light machine gun.

They are frequently sited in pairs and were often dug in with overhead earth cover.

Vickers MMG emplacements of this exact type are uncommon; just over 75 are recorded as extant, but there are many local variants of this basic type.

== Other hardened defences ==
=== Field gun emplacements ===
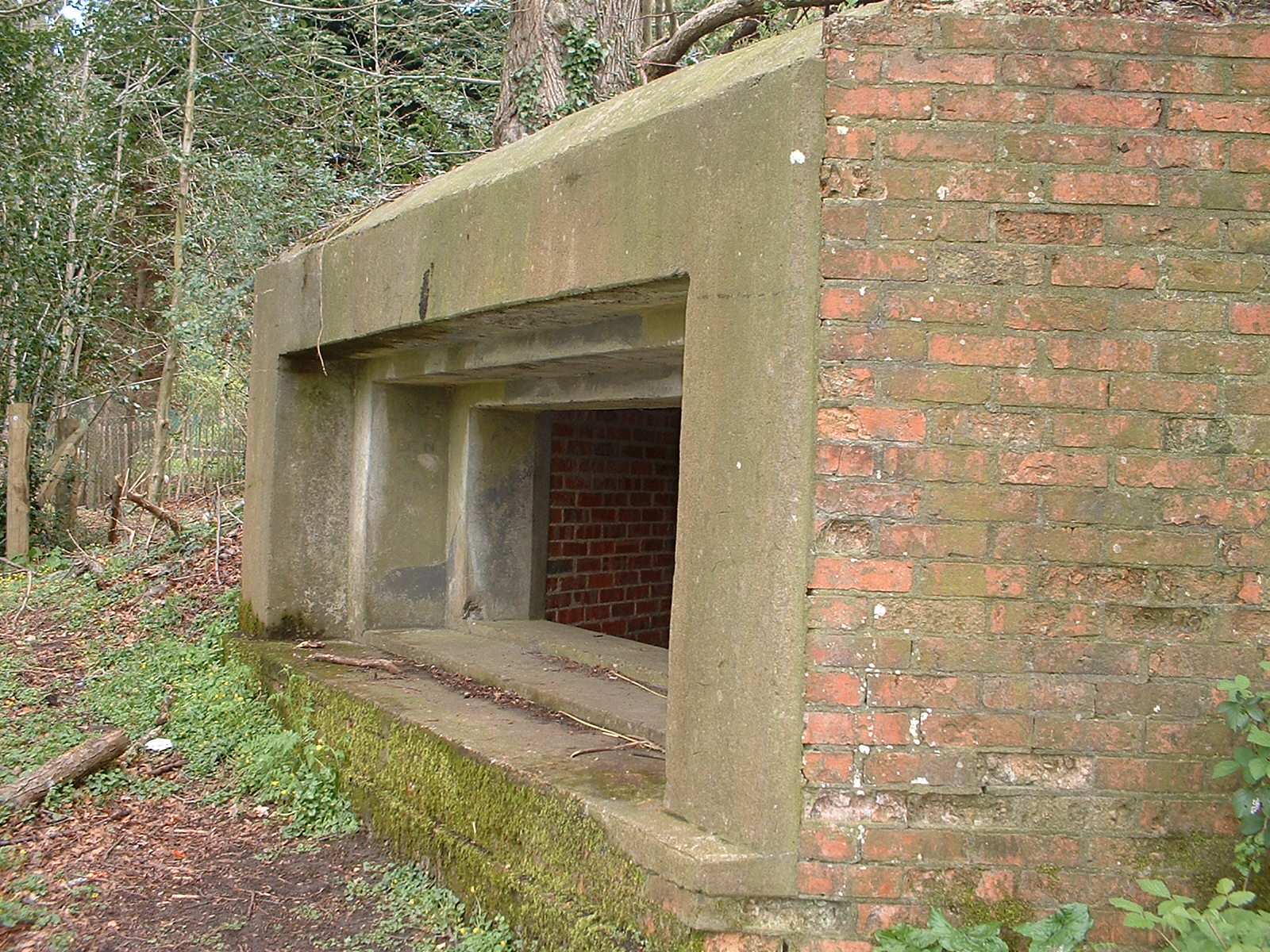
Field gun emplacement

There were a wide variety of field gun emplacements; most resembled a larger version of the Type 28 pillbox. Fifty or so remain extant.

=== Cantilevered pillbox ===
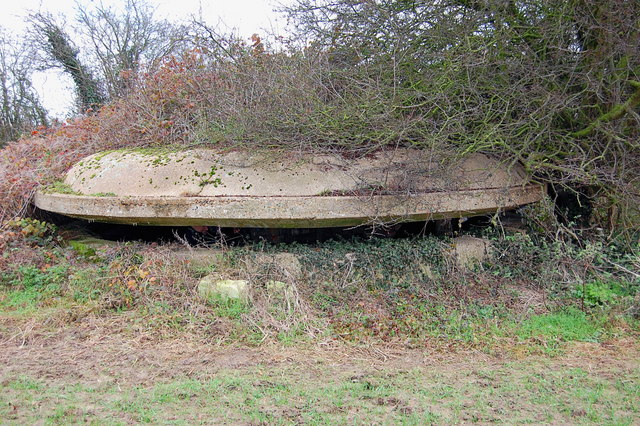
A Cantilever Pillbox at London Southend Airport.

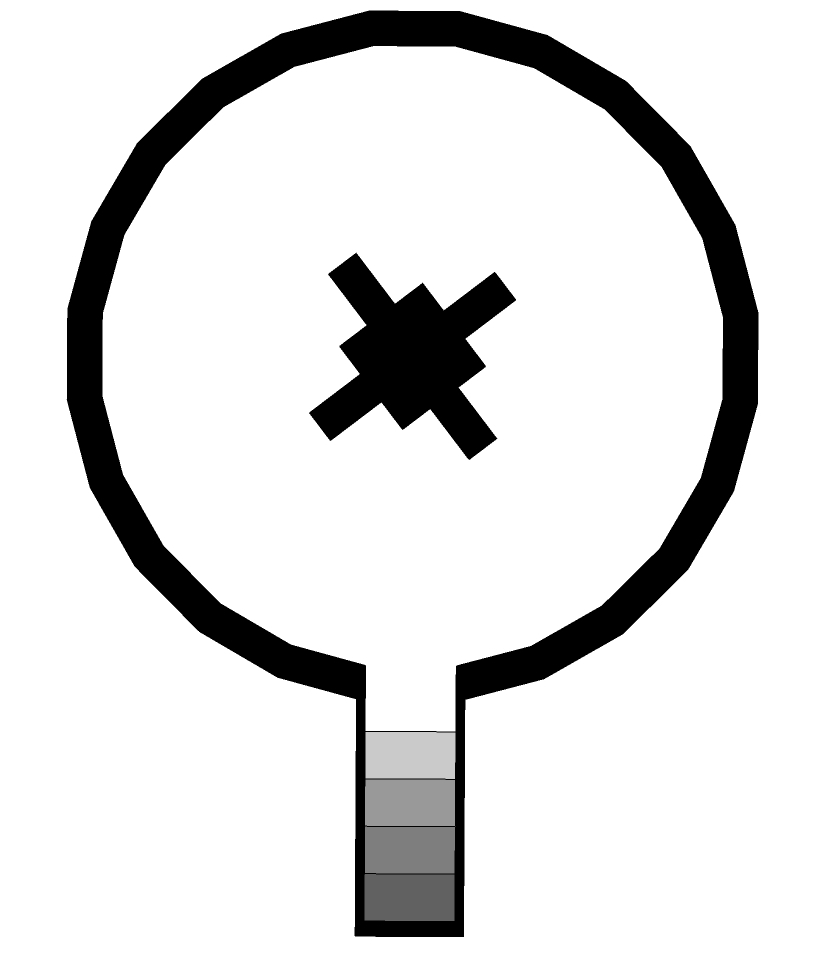
Cantilevered pillbox plan view.

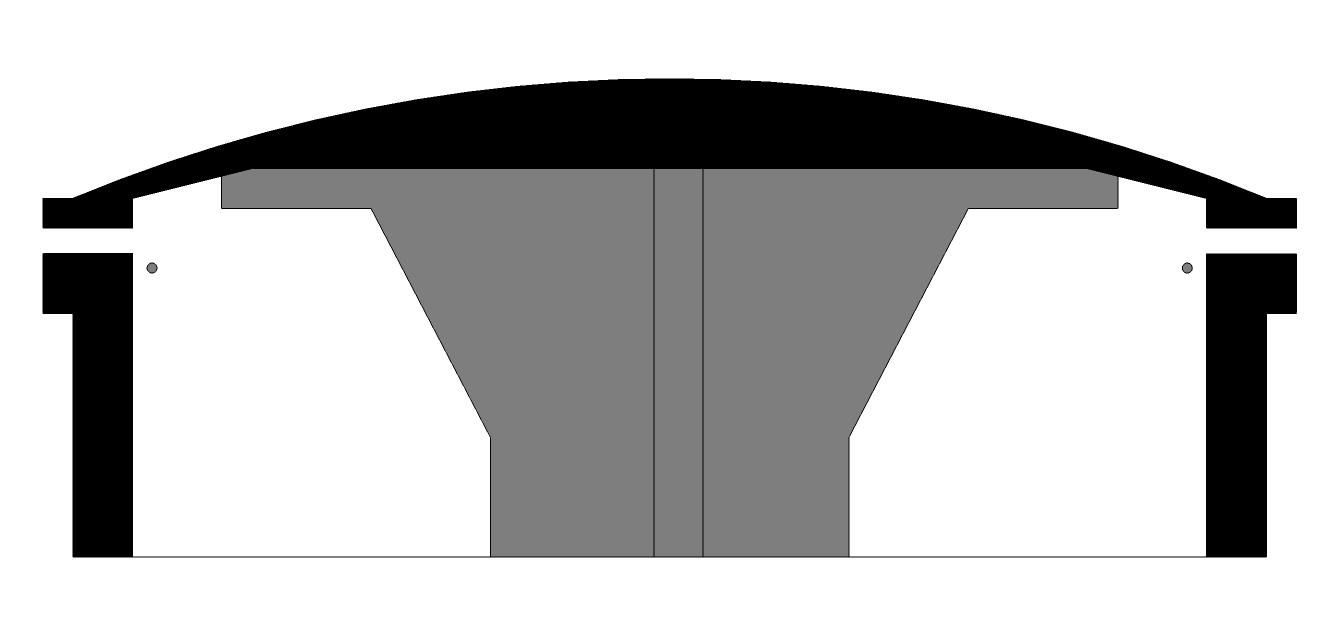
Cantilevered pillbox cross section.

The Cantilevered pillbox was designed and constructed by F C Construction for airfield defence. The cantilevered design allowed a 360° embrasure for all-round defence against air-landed troops at the expense of some protection. The central cross-shaped pillar acts as an anti-ricochet wall. Weapons were mounted on a tubular rail for 360° traverse. The type is also known as an F.C. Type, Mushroom Type or Oakington Type. There are 53 examples of this type still extant.

=== Lozenge pillbox ===
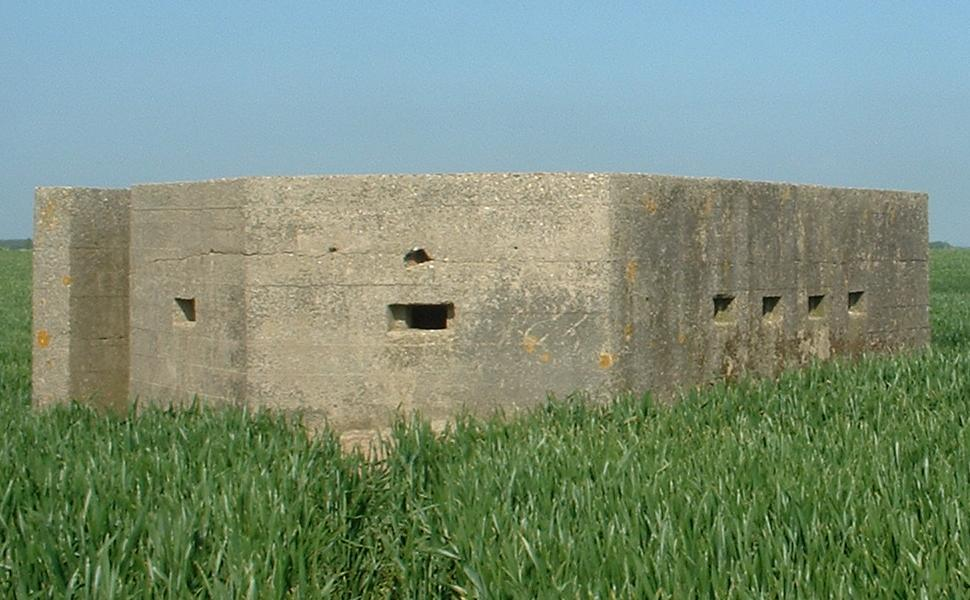
Extant example at Atwick in the East Riding of Yorkshire. TA194512.

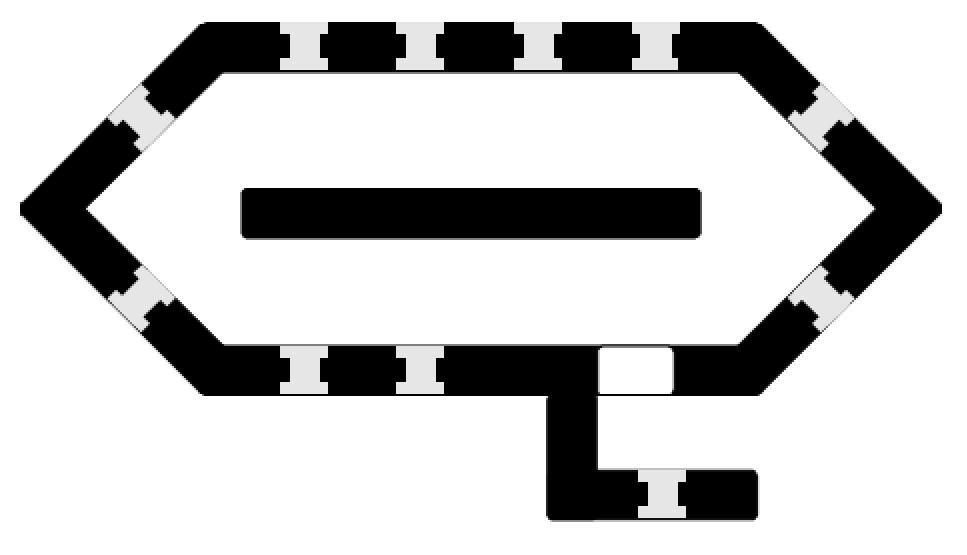
Horizontal section at the level of the embrasures.

Pillbox Type Lozenge. Note stretched hexagonal plan with central anti-ricochet wall.

The lozenge pillbox is found only in the North East of England. Lozenge pillboxes are an irregular hexagon in plan with the front and rear walls significantly longer than the others; this allows space for four forward-facing embrasures. The rear wall has two embrasures and an entrance. The four short walls each have a single embrasure. Internally, an anti-ricochet wall runs longitudinally. It was designed for infantry armed with rifles and/or light machine guns. 176 examples of this type remain extant.

=== Essex Lozenge ===
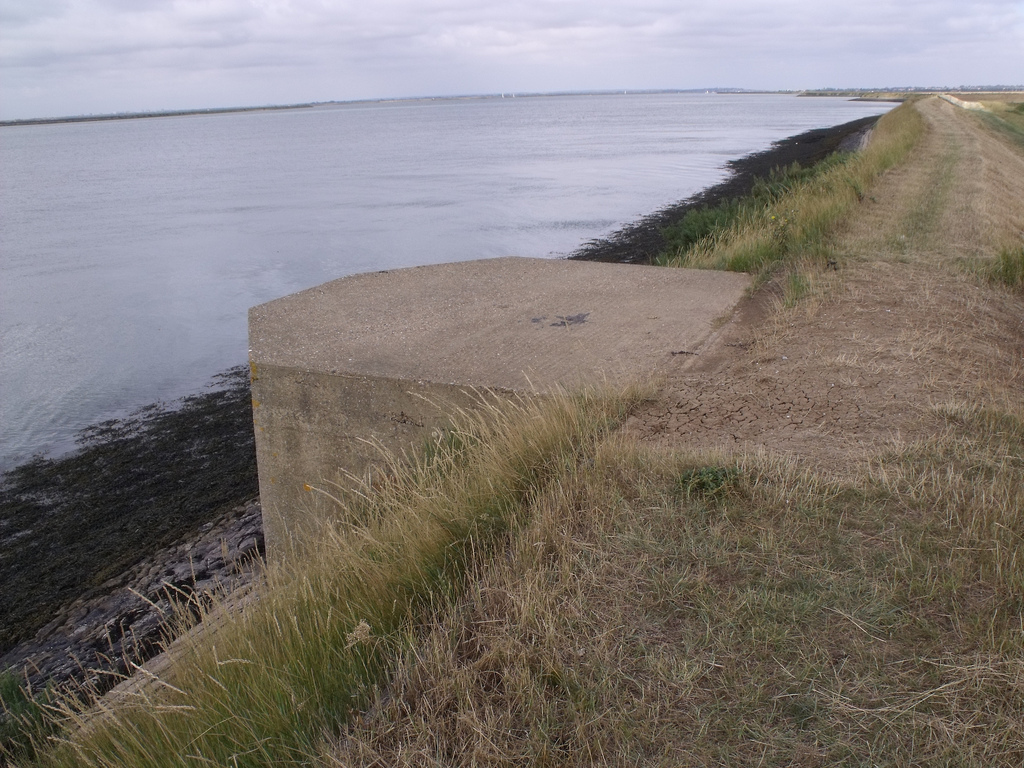
The front section of an Essex Lozenge near Burnham on Crouch

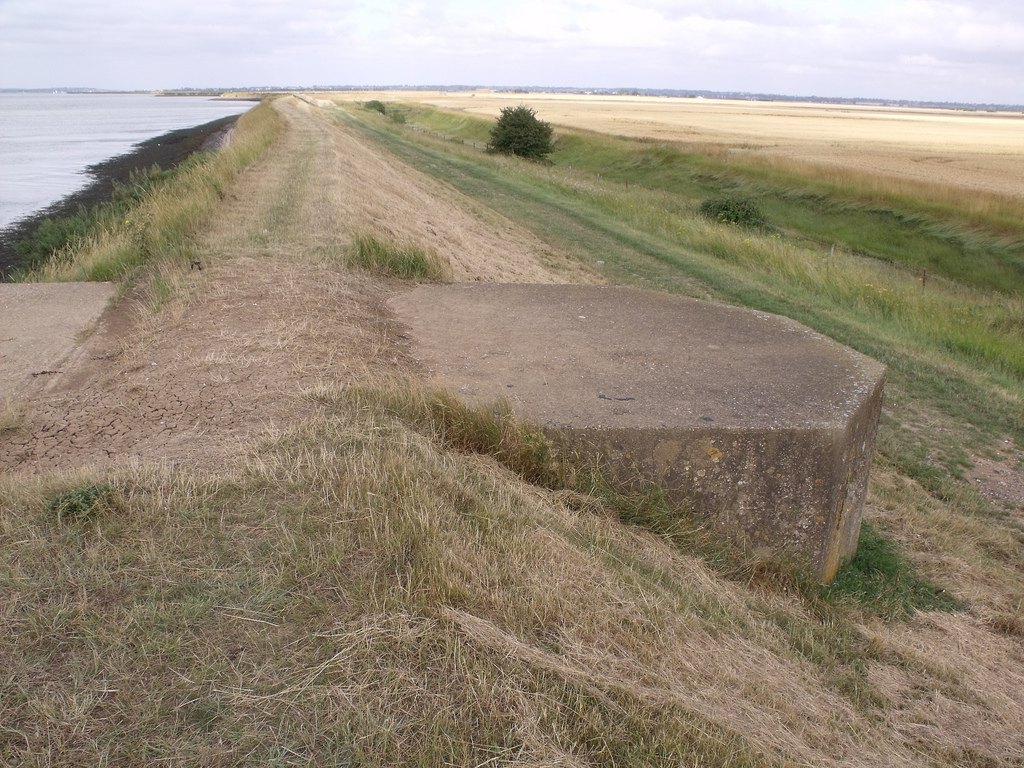
The rear section of an Essex Lozenge near Burnham on Crouch

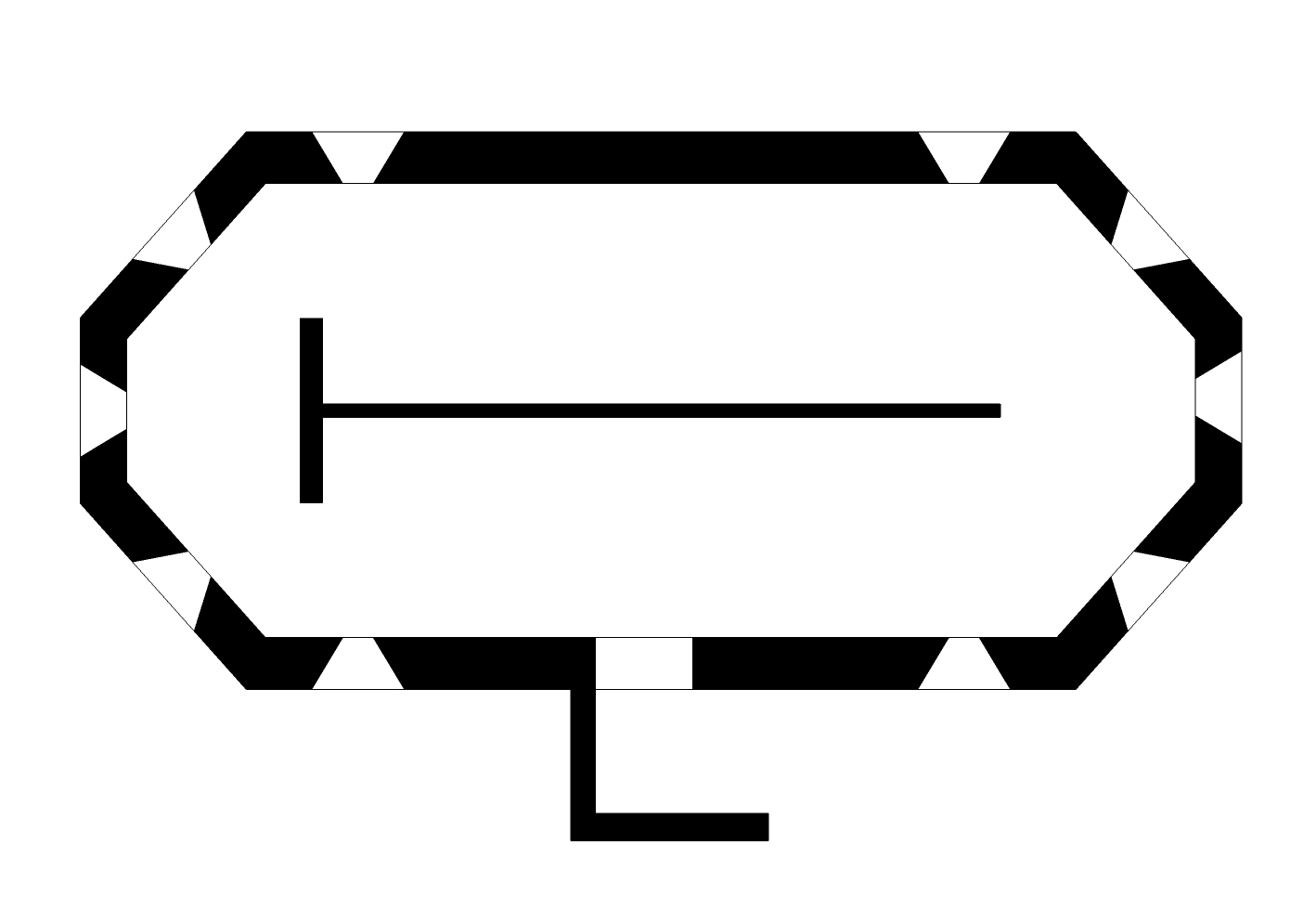
Plan View of an Essex Lozenge at embrasure level.

An Essex Lozenge at Burnham on Crouch TR01009549.

The Essex Lozenge is unique to the seawalls of that county. It is sometimes referred to as a through-the-wall pillbox as they penetrate the present sea wall. This is misleading, however, as the seawall was raised after the war, partially burying the pillboxes that originally sat on top of it. These pillboxes are large, elongated octagons and have three faces with embrasures at the front and rear and two long side walls, each of which has two embrasures close to either end of the wall. One side has the entrance, which has an attached porch. The mirrored front and back embrasures were intended to allow fire in both directions so the pillbox could not be flanked or bypassed by troops that managed to penetrate inland. Internally, there is a large anti-ricochet wall that runs the length of the chamber with a T section at the front end but not the rear. The majority of these pillboxes are inaccessible as the entrances are now buried in the seawall. 36 examples of this type remain extant.

=== Pentagonal pillbox ===
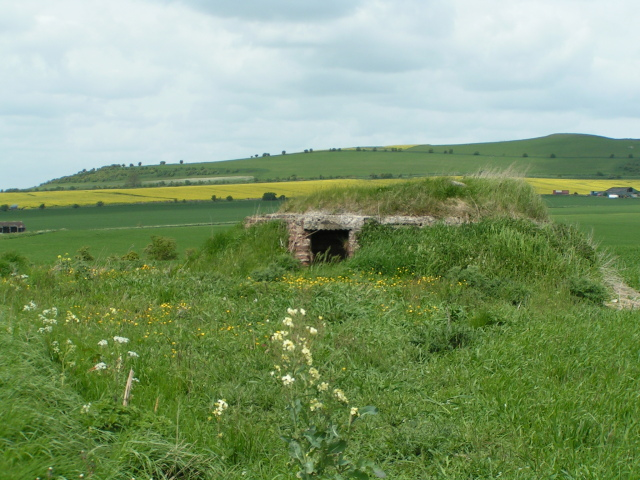
Pentagonal pillbox at Alton Barnes, Wiltshire

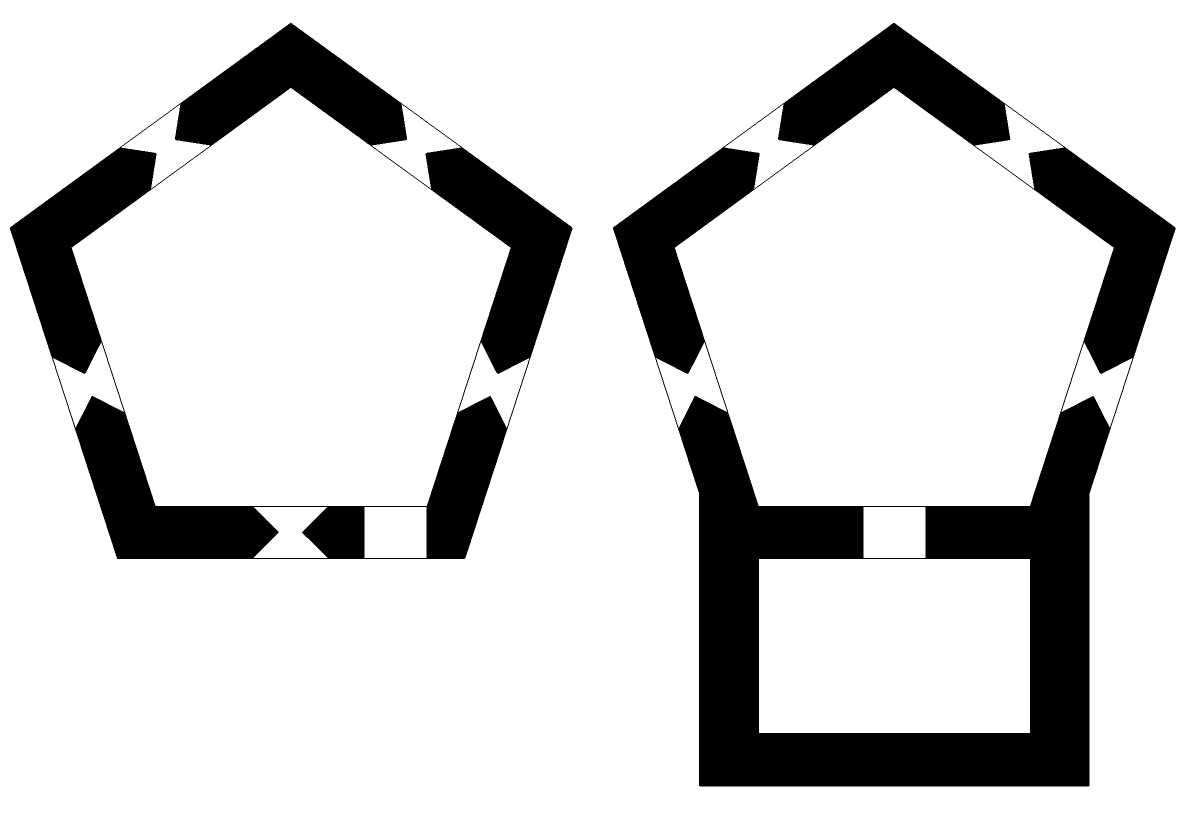
Plan view of a pentagonal pillbox and its AA variant

Pentagonal pillboxes are only found at or near airfields.

Pentagonal pillboxes are only found at or near airfields, so are almost certainly an Air Ministry design, although no drawings have been found to support this idea. They are regular pentagons in shape, with a variant form having an added AAMG well at the rear. They also show some variation in size, with the smallest having external wall lengths of approximately 3m and the largest at 4.5m; this variation may be a result of later thickening of the walls of some thin-walled pillboxes at airfields. They are generally fitted with Turnbull Mounts allowing the use of a wide range of weapons. The versions with an AA well have four embrasures and those without have five centrally placed in each face. The door in these variants is offset to accommodate the fifth embrasure.

=== Eared pillbox ===
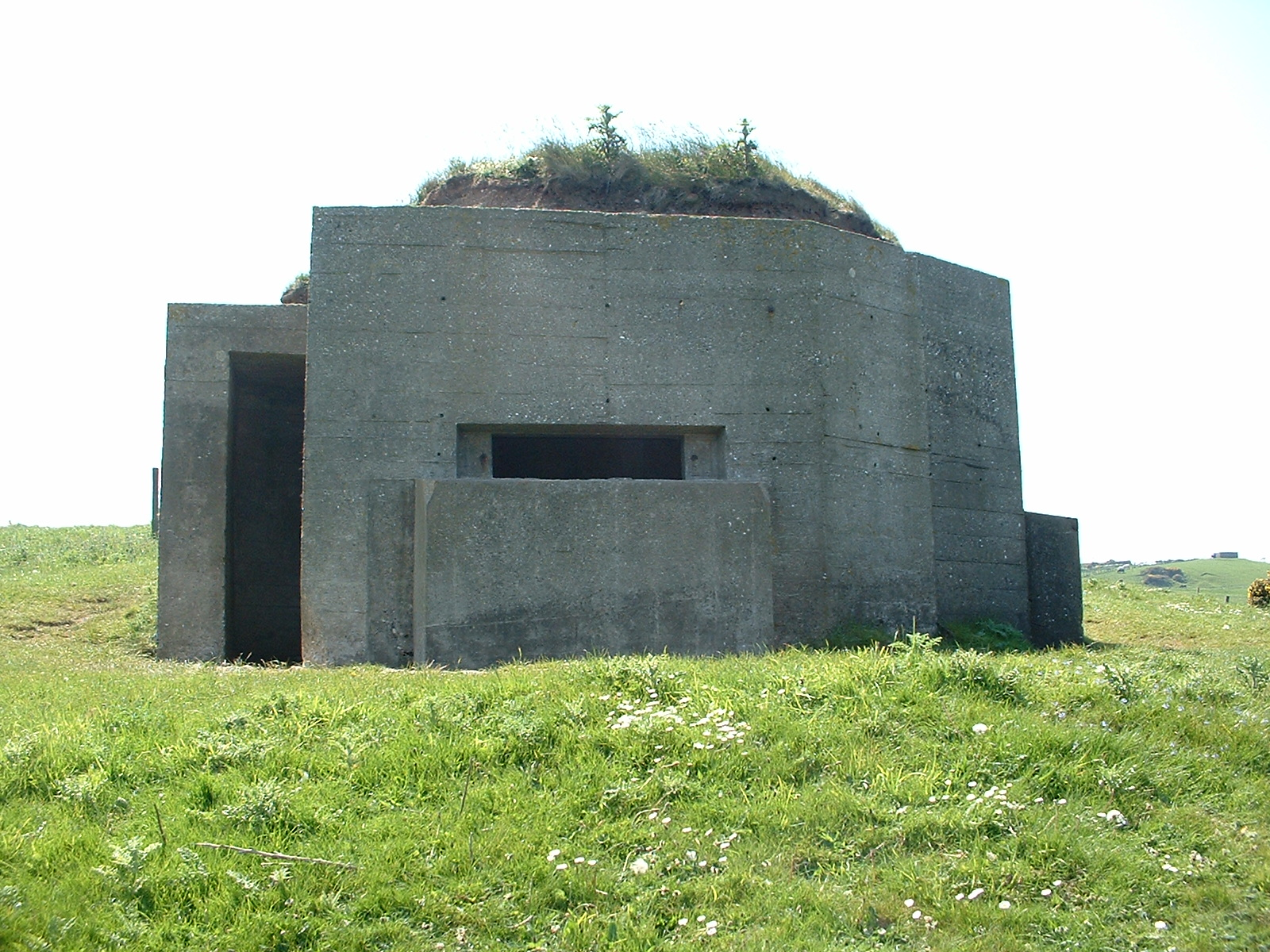
Extant example in Speeton in North Yorkshire. TA150750.

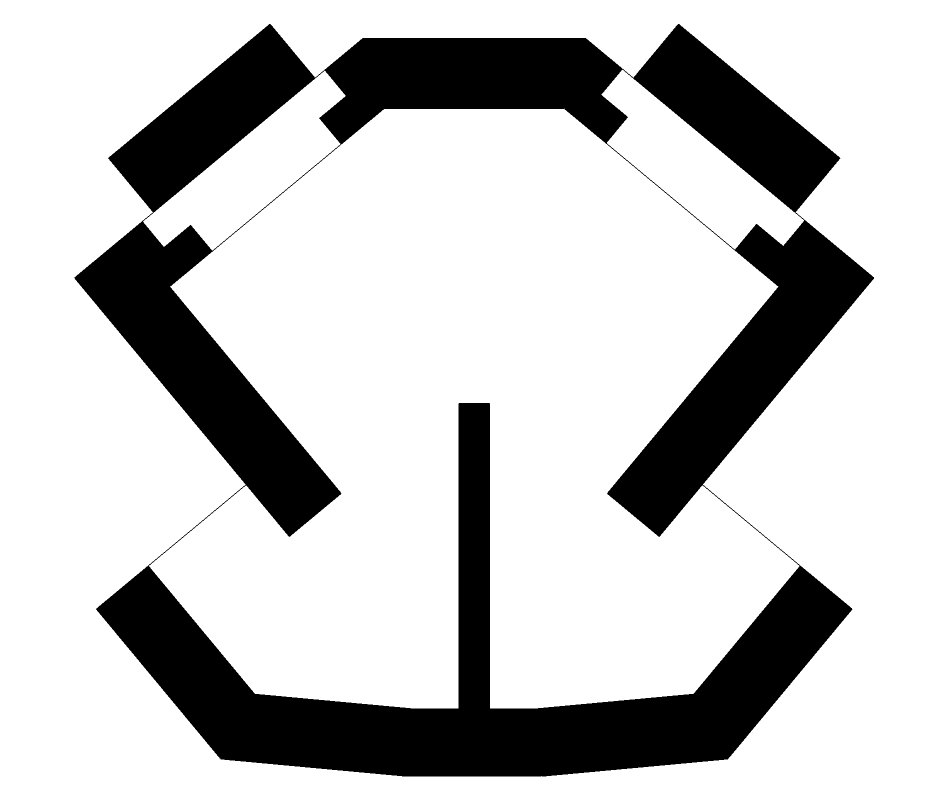
Horizontal section at the level of the embrasures.

Pillbox Type: Eared. Note large embrasures with projecting boxes (grey) and a small internal anti-ricochet wall. Also, two entrances, each facing in the same direction as the embrasures.

The eared pillbox is, like the lozenge pillbox, found only in the North East of England and has an irregular hexagon plan. There are two large embrasures intended for medium machine guns. There is a bulge at the base of the wall below the embrasures that is thought to have accommodated the cooling system for the machine gun. Internally, there is a short anti-ricochet wall.

The two embrasures are at approximately 80° to each other, giving an arc of fire of about 180° with no way to direct fire behind the pillbox. This design is frequently found on or near beaches – ideal for providing enfilading fire. There are two entrances with openings in the same direction as the embrasures. Only 16 examples of this type remain extant.

=== Northumberland 'D' Type ===
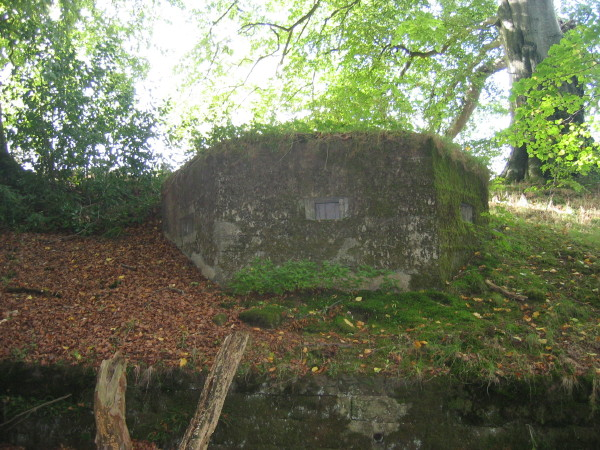
A D type built into the bank of a road near Eglingham. NU10571960.

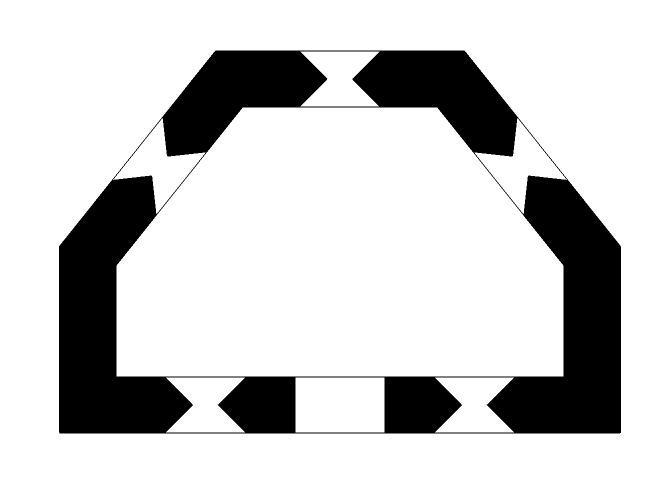
Plan View of a D type Pillbox.

Northumberland D Type Pillbox.

The D Type pillbox is a type unique to Northumberland, the name coming from its D-shaped plan. Superficially it is similar to a Type 24 as the front has three similarly angled faces approximately 2m long. However, the side walls are very short (~1m) and parallel to each other with no embrasures. The rear wall is approximately 5m long with two embrasures in the examples that are not partially buried. The entrance is in the centre of the rear wall. 17 extant examples of this type have been identified from the Defence of Britain Survey.

=== Lincolnshire three-bay ===
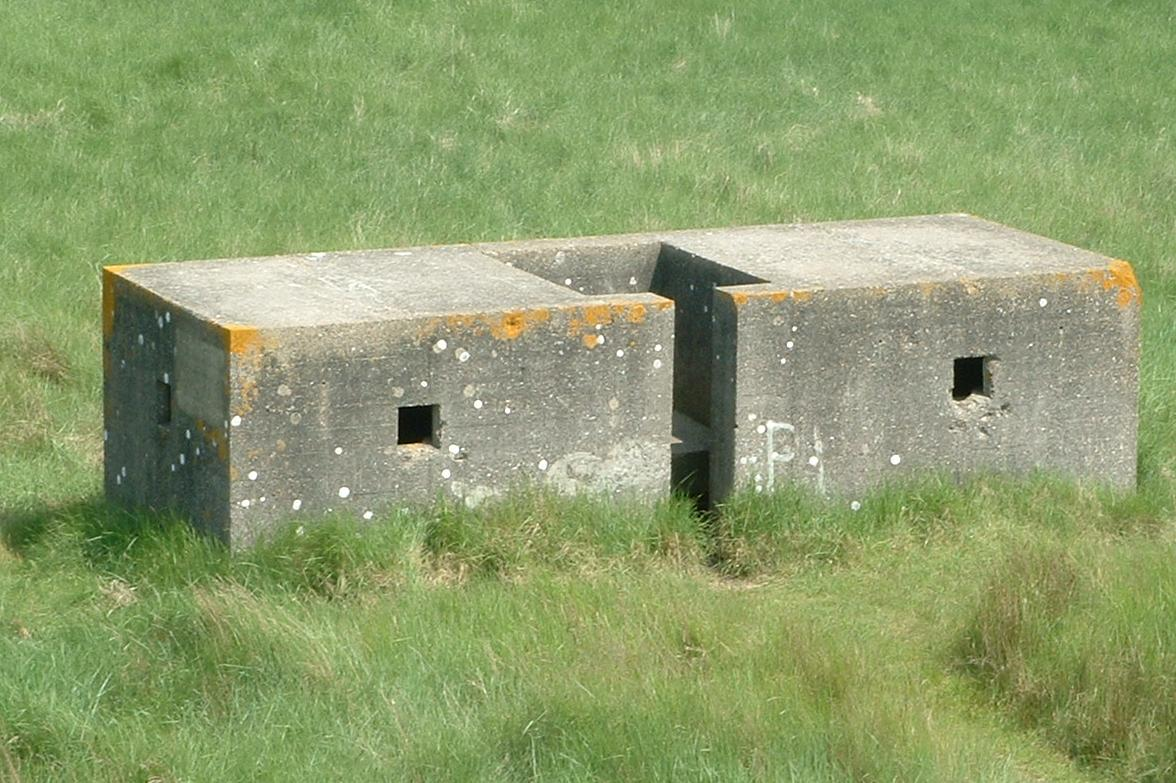
Extant example in Saltfleetby in Lincolnshire. TF462928.

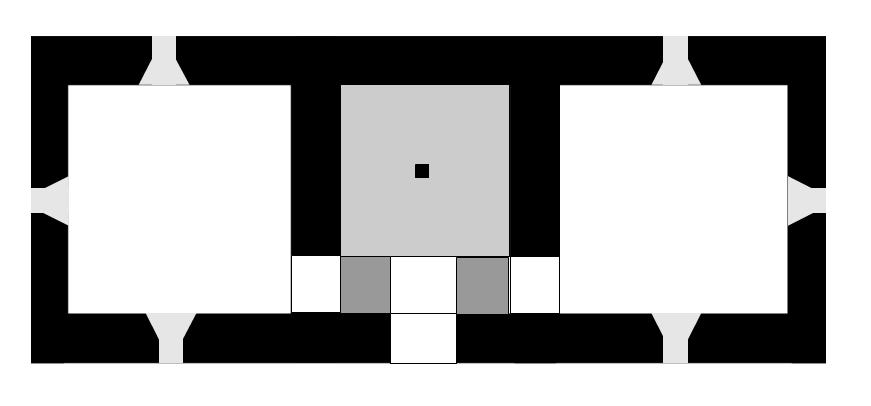
Horizontal section at the level of the embrasures

Pillbox Type: Lincolnshire three-bay built to bulletproof standard. Note rectangular plan featuring two roofed fighting compartments and a central slightly raised platform for anti-aircraft weapon (grey).

Found only in Lincolnshire, this type has become known as a Lincolnshire three-bay pillbox. It is essentially a modification of the FW3 Type 23, having an open light anti-aircraft position in the centre and fully enclosed bays at either end. 44 examples of this type remain extant.

=== Dover Quad ===
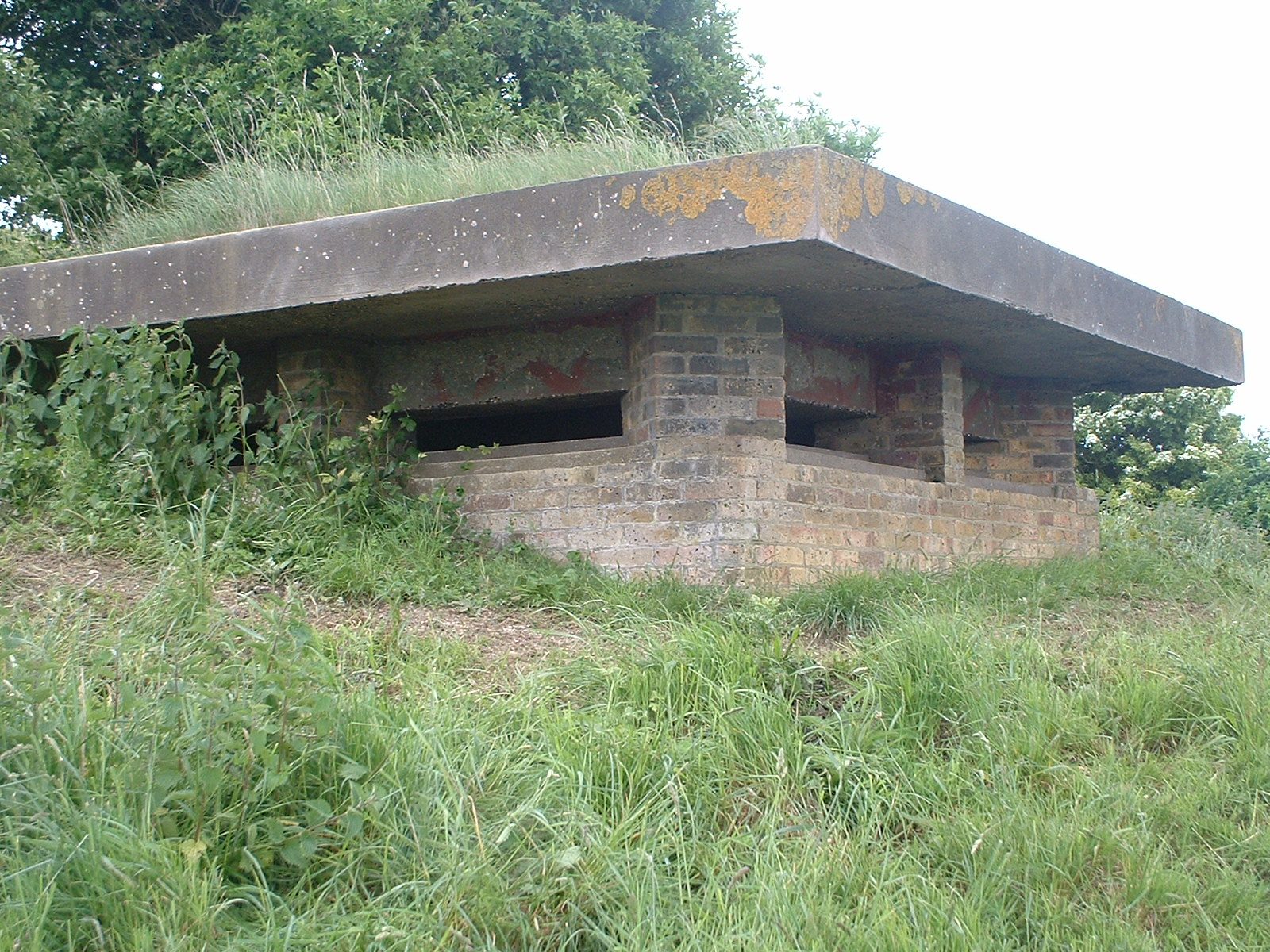
Extant example at Western Heights, Dover, Kent. TR292400.

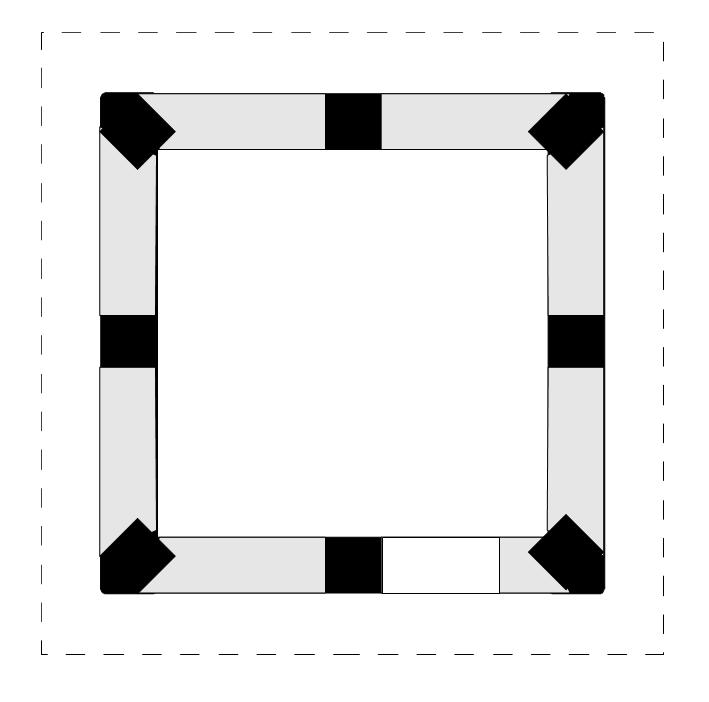
Horizontal section at the level of the embrasures.

Pillbox Type: Dover Quad. Note square plan with wide embrasures. The extent of the overhanging roof is shown as a dotted line.

The Dover Quad pillbox is a 13-foot (4.0 m) square pillbox with wide embrasures and an overhanging roof slab. This design is only found in the Dover area of England and is very often found at high commanding positions. In the view of some commentators, the Dover Quad is a poor design: the overhanging slab, while offering some protection from strafing, is liable to ricochet bullets from below into the embrasure, which is, in any case, wide, giving inadequate protection. Given the strategic importance of the port of Dover, it is possible that these were among the first World War II pillboxes constructed and they may have pre-dated the FW3 designs, but there is no evidence for this. 24 examples of this type remain extant.

=== Suffolk Square ===
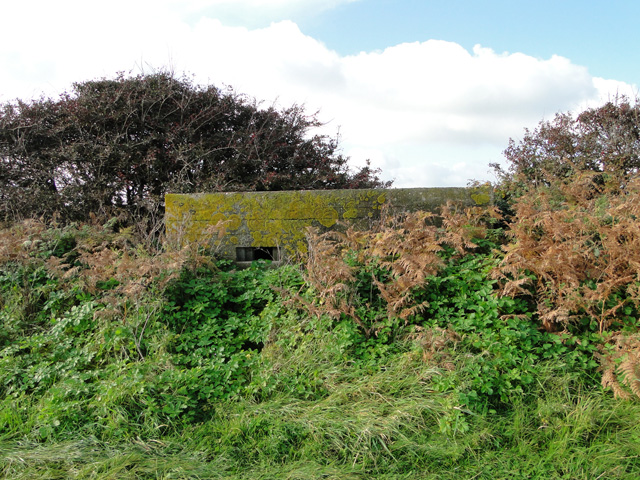
A Suffolk Square at Benacre.

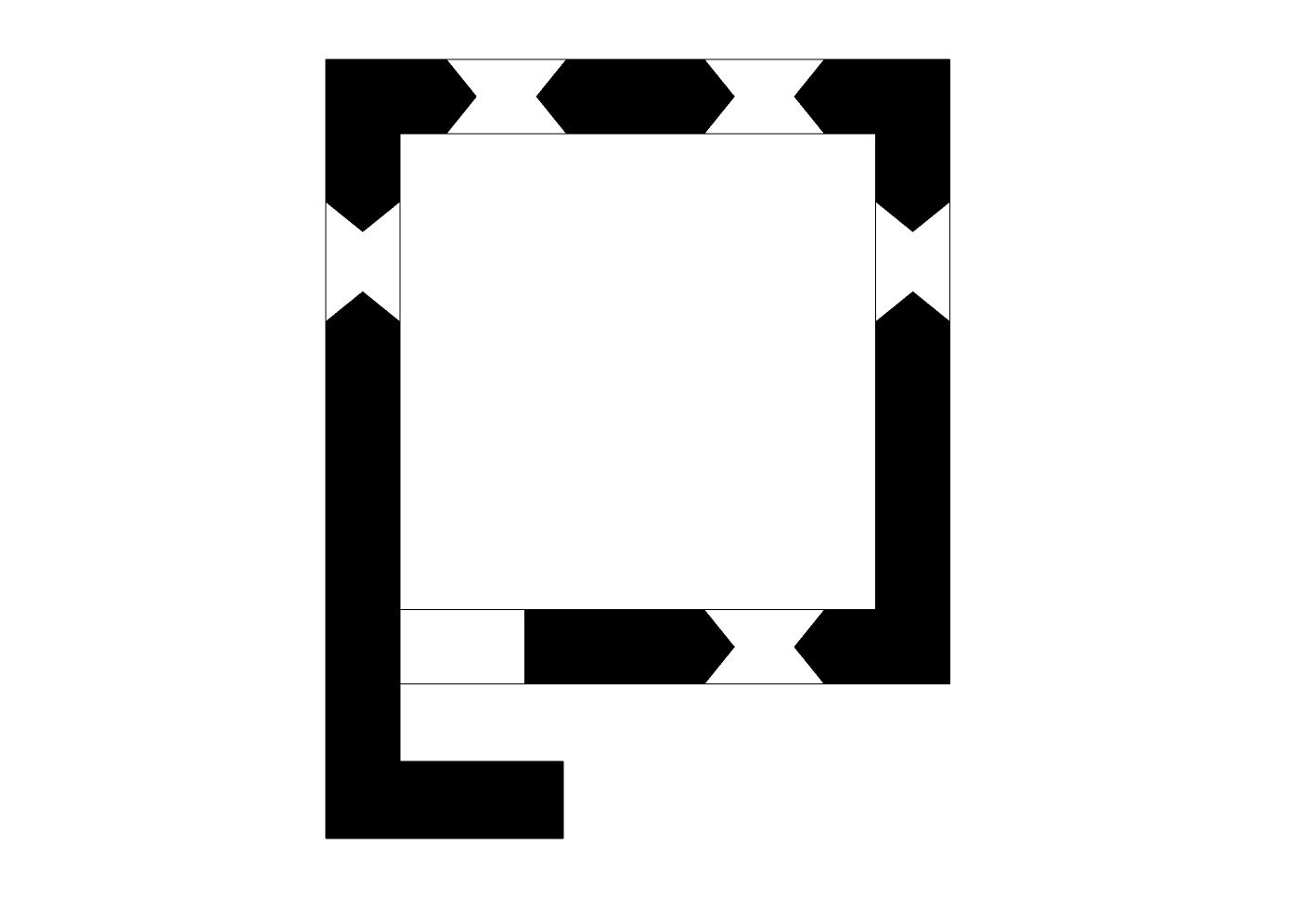
Suffolk Square Pillbox plan at the level of the embrasures.

The Suffolk Square, as its name suggests, is unique to Suffolk. This is a square pillbox with walls of length 12 ft 6in similar to a Type 26 but slightly larger; the walls are thin at 1 ft 6in. They are most commonly shuttered with concrete blocks and have two embrasures in the front face with one each in the other faces. Some have a covered porch protecting the entrance. 37 examples of this type remain extant.

=== Section post/Seagull trench ===
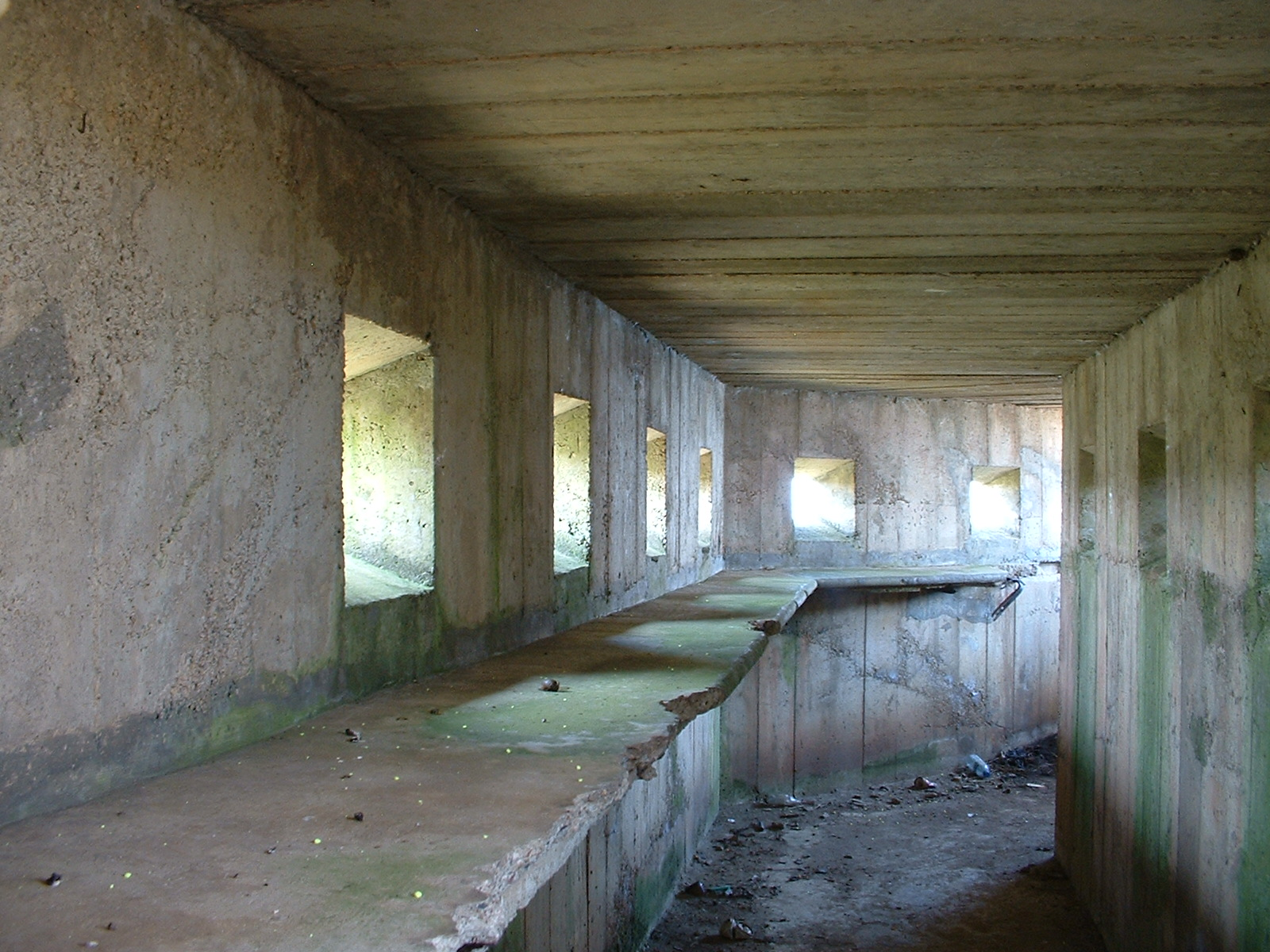
Section post interior.

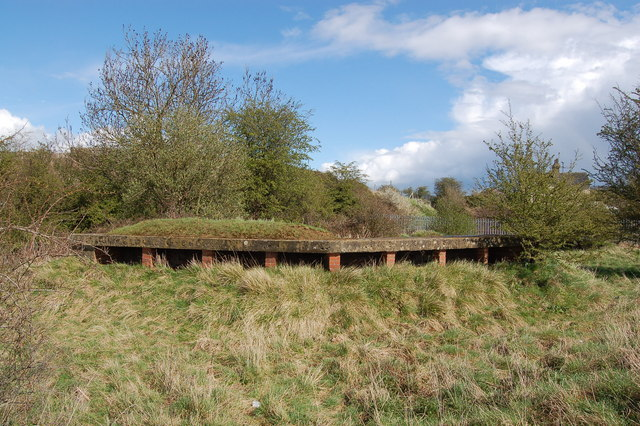
World War II Seagull trench at former RAF Stoke Orchard.

Examples of a Section Post and Seagull Trench.

Section posts are essentially hardened trench works. Constructed to bulletproof standard, occasionally without a roof, they are long and have a large number of embrasures. Shelves of wood or concrete are fitted below the embrasures in the principal direction. A specific subtype of the section post is the Seagull trench, named for its W-shaped plan view like a seagull's wings. These are predominantly found at airfields. 21 examples of the Seagull trench and 26 examples of Section posts remain extant.

=== Eastern Command variants ===
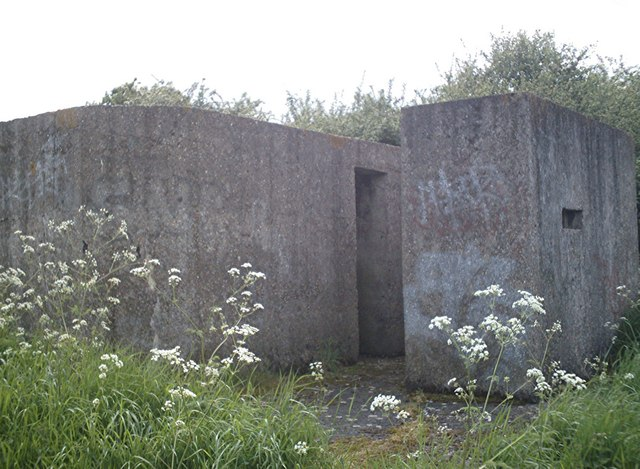
A rear view of an eastern Command Type pillbox near Rettendon in Essex, showing the huge blast wall covering the entrance.

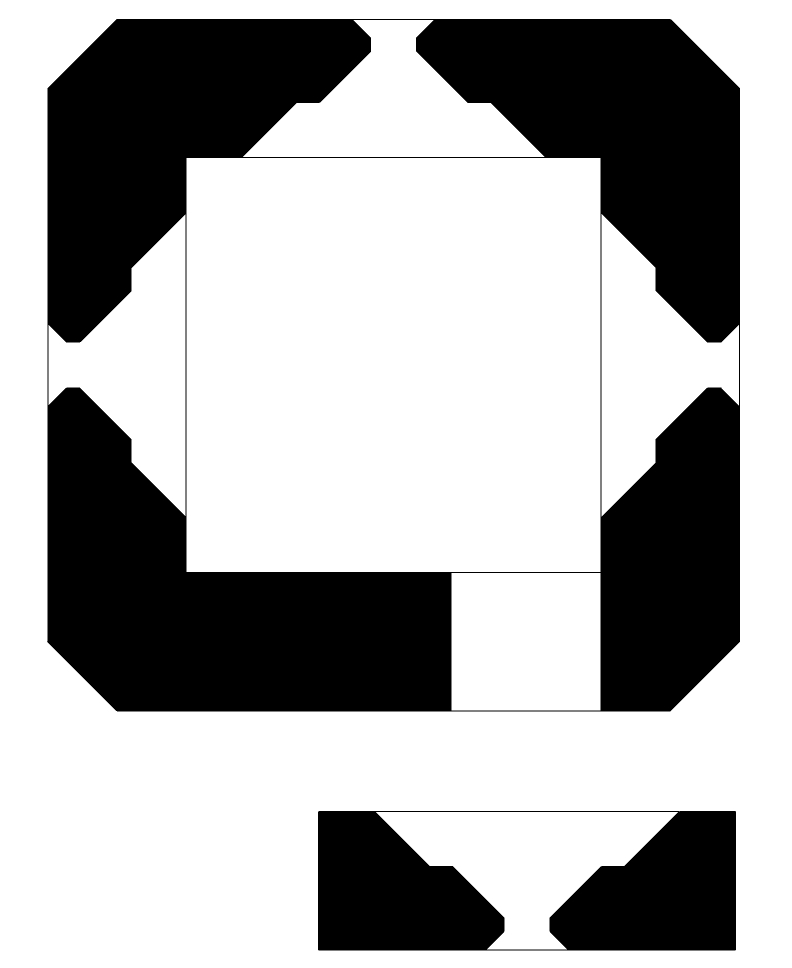
Eastern Command Variant pillbox plan view.

Eastern Command Type Pillbox.

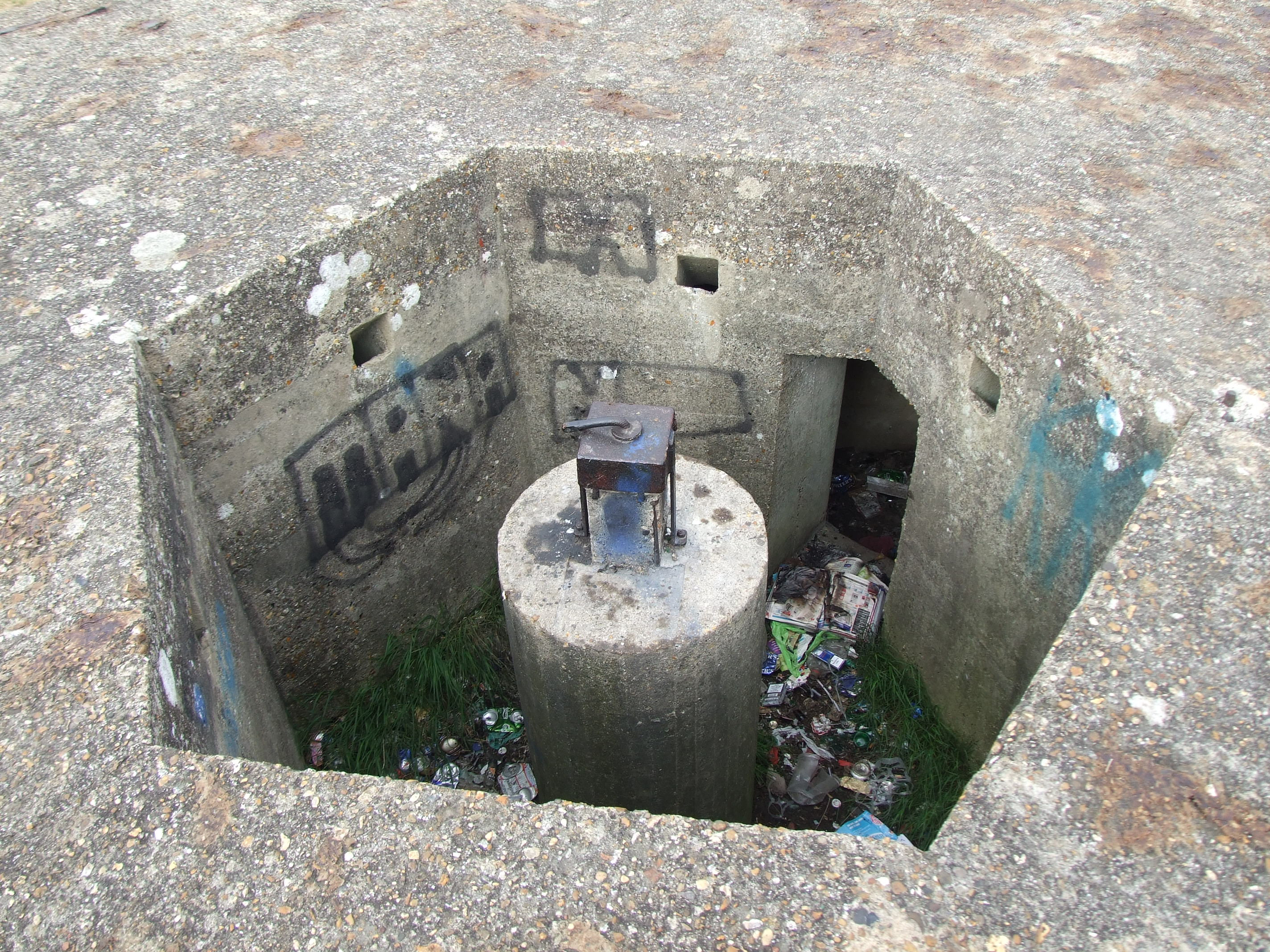
Central well of hexagonal CRE 1113 variant.

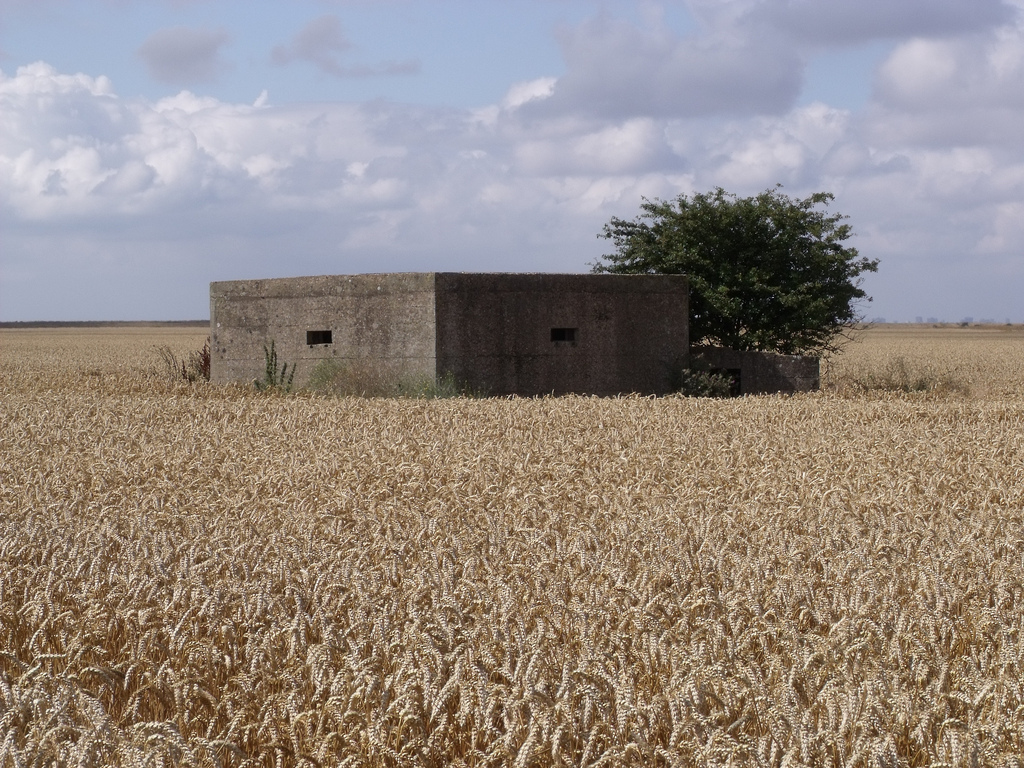
A CRE 1113 Type 22 variant at Burnham on Crouch.

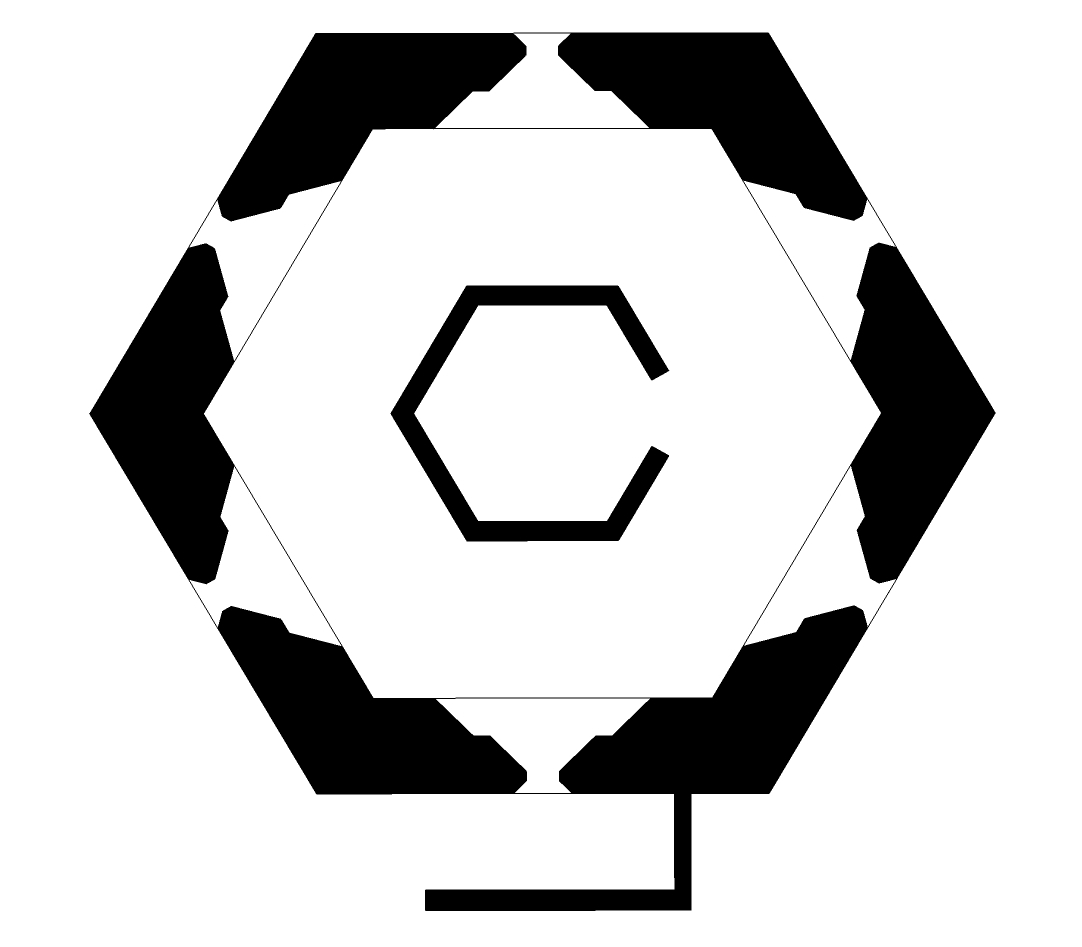
Eastern Command Type 22 (CRE 1113) variant plan.

Detail of CRE 1113 Type 22 variant.

Eastern Command commissioned a number of variant forms for their area of operation. The most common is known as the Eastern Command Type and is an infantry variant of the Vickers MMG emplacement. It varies from that type by having Bren embrasures in the three front faces and the entrance at the rear rather than one side, covered by a very thick blast wall. They are most commonly found in Essex and Suffolk along the main Eastern Command line, and 64 examples remain extant.

The second type of common variant has been consistently misidentified by the Defence of Britain survey as a Type 27 and has led to the misconception that there is a Hexagonal variant of that type. The pillbox is actually an enlarged Type 22 with a central AA well and 3 ft 6in walls. Documents in the National Archives refer to this type as drawing CRE 1113; a variant form of this type without the central AA well also exists. Another variant Type 22 is referred to as drawing CRE 1094: this is effectively a thin-walled version of CRE 1113, with 1 ft 6in thick walls. These types are found mainly along the River Stour stop line, where 113 remain extant.

Another variant referred to is drawing CRE 1116. This is actually externally indistinguishable from a Type 28A designed for a 6Pdr. The main difference is that the dividing wall between the main gun chamber and the infantry chamber has been omitted.

=== ROF Type ===
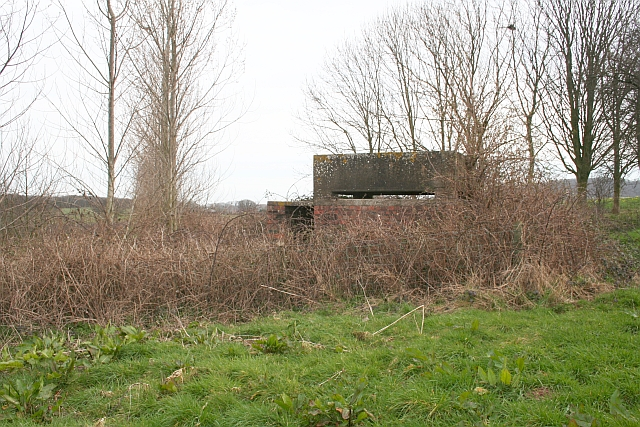
ROF Pillbox at Blakemore Hill.

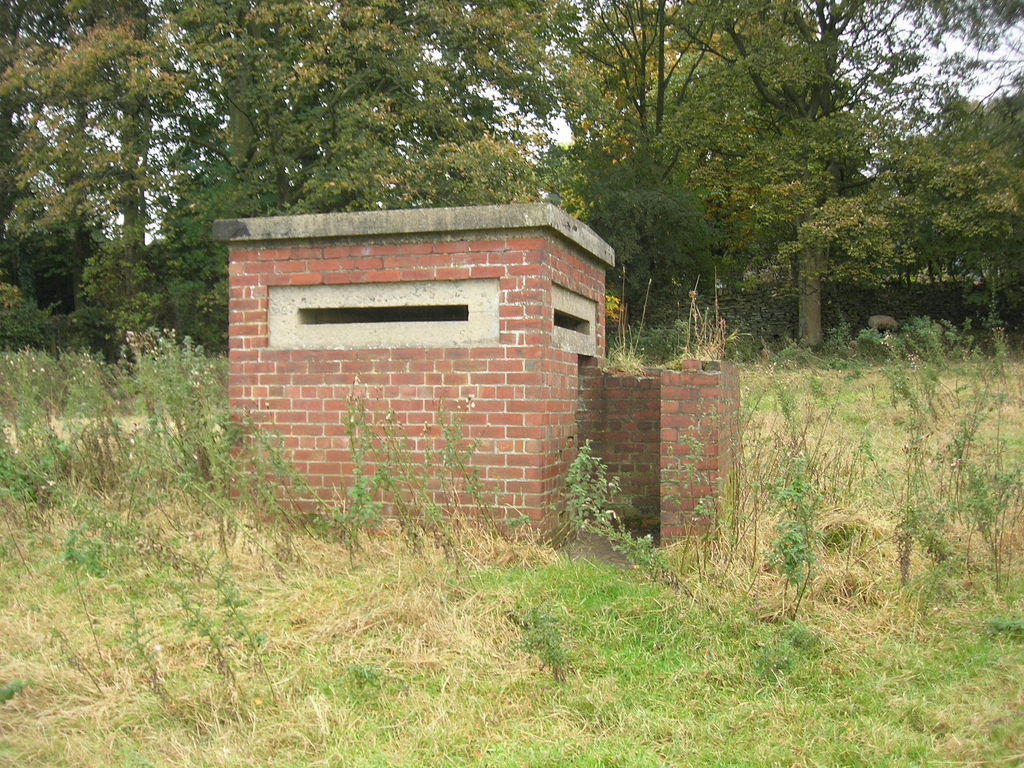
ROF type pillbox at ROF Steeton.

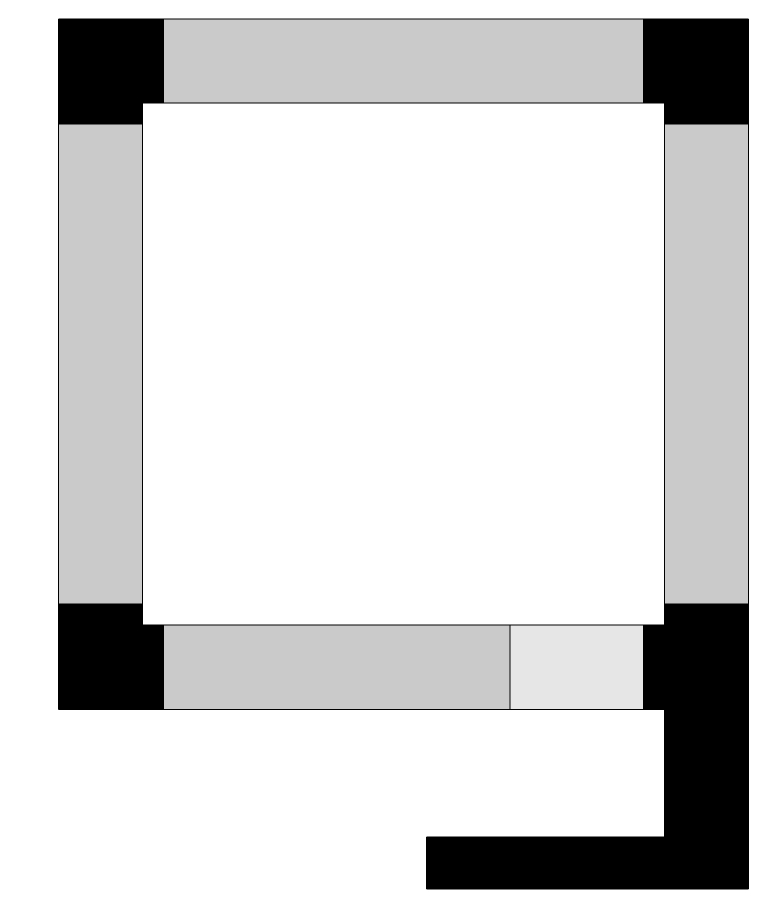
Plan view of an ROF type pillbox.

Examples of ROF type pillboxes.

The Royal Ordnance Factories (ROFs) and depots were critical to the war effort and considered vulnerable to enemy ground attack, so were often protected by pillboxes. In the case of the larger factories, the standard FW3 types were used, but at smaller sites a special type was used. These were small flat-roofed square pillboxes, usually with distinctive long narrow embrasures in at least three of their sides; the door was usually low and protected by a blast wall. In some cases, such as at Norton Fitzwarren in Somerset, an AA position accessed by a ladder was added to the top of the pillbox. In a few locations, the narrow embrasure was replaced by a more standard rifle embrasure, as the narrow embrasure would have been difficult to use as a firing position due to its position and size. The long narrow observation type embrasure suggests these pillboxes were mainly intended as guard posts or fire watching posts, but would have served as a defensive position in the event of an attack. They are usually about 8 ft square but there is some variation in size across the country, and could accommodate two or three men. This type of pillbox is probably the most at risk as former ROF sites are being redeveloped for housing and industry; approximately 30 still exist.

=== Norcon pillbox ===
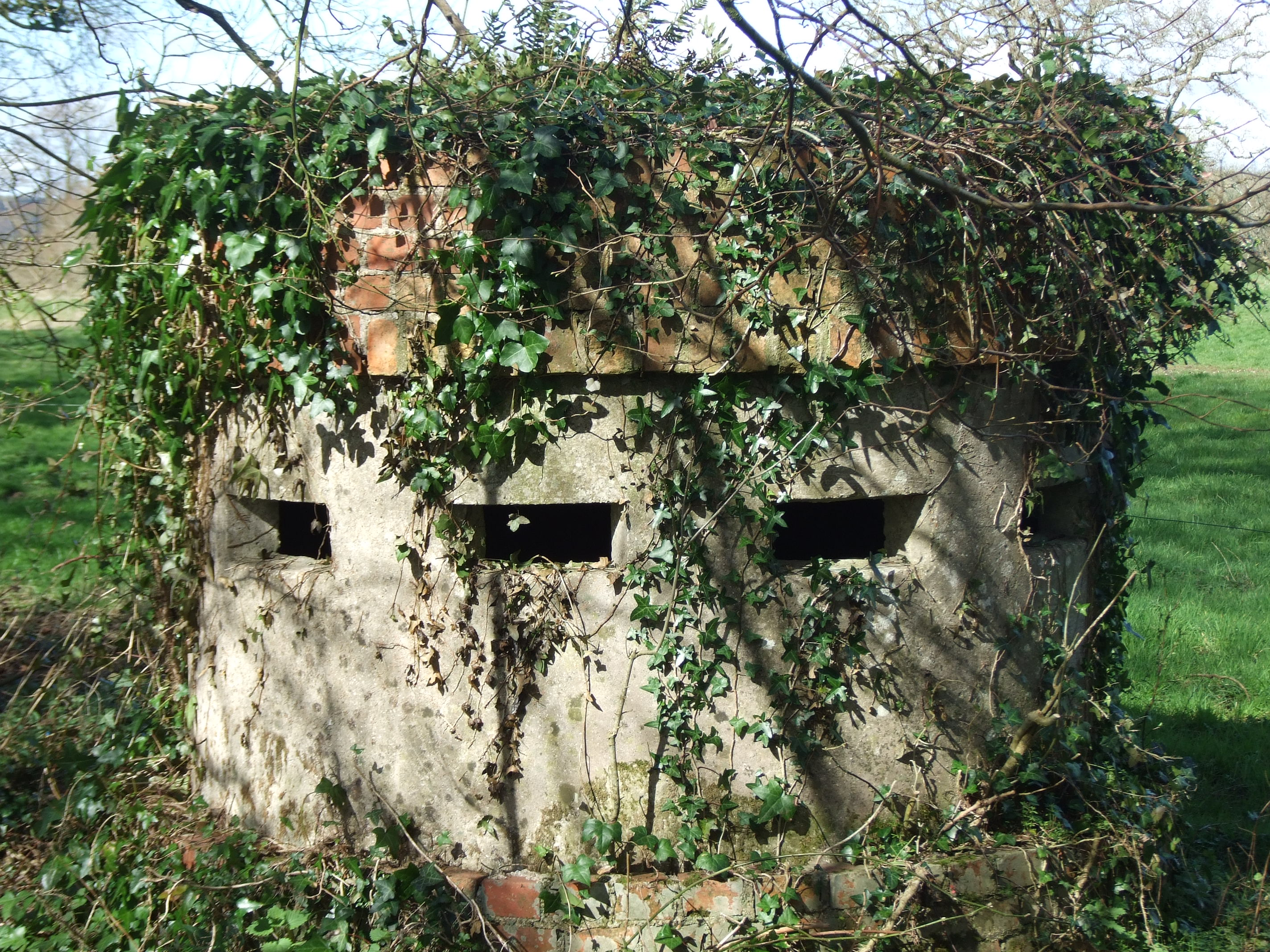
Extant example of Norcon Pillbox at Moreton Ford, near Weymouth, Dorset. SY805895.

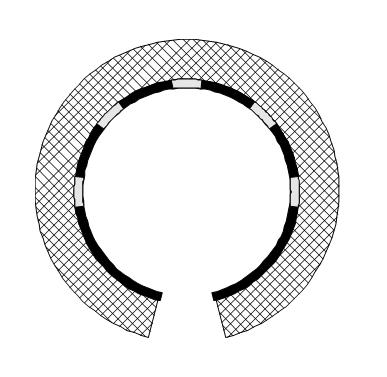
Horizontal section at the level of the embrasures.

Norcon Pillbox. Note small size, circular plan and thin walls. The checked area represents additional sandbag protection.

The Norcon was a small circular pillbox named after the company that manufactured it as a private commercial venture. It was made from a concrete pipe 6 feet (1.8 m) in diameter and 4 feet (1.2 m) high; the walls were 4 inches (10 cm) of non-reinforced concrete with several cut loopholes. It was described as being possibly the most dangerous, cheap and nasty of all the pillbox designs. Being quick to manufacture was its biggest asset: it was possible to turn out about 20 a day, the concrete being cured in about 24 hours, but few were actually built. The standard model lacked a roof. Others had a roof made of timber and corrugated iron, and earth; extra protection was provided by the use of sandbags. Only 27 examples of this type remain.

=== Ruck machine gun post/pillbox ===
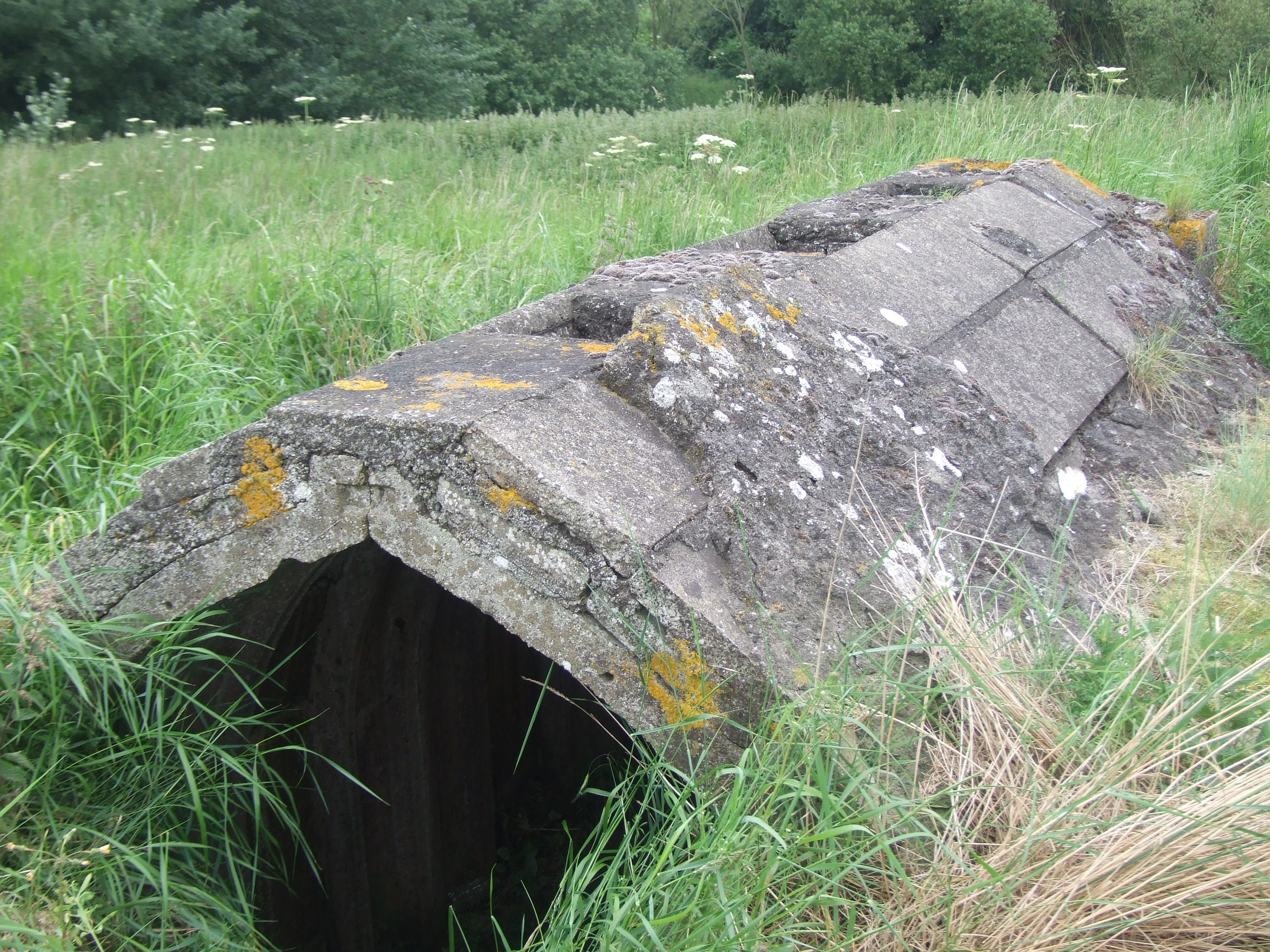
Extant example of a Ruck machine gun post at Lawyers' Creek, Holbeach. Horizontal embrasures on one side are partially buried. Note vertical embrasures.

The Ruck machine gun post (or Ruck pillbox) was designed by James Ruck and was made from prefabricated sections, paving slabs, sandbags and rammed earth. The Ruck machine gun post was relatively widely used in Lincolnshire and along the east coast of England, but is now extremely rare with just a handful of extant examples. Five Ruck machine gun post sites are recorded in the Defence of Britain database, only two of which are thought to be extant.

=== Pickett-Hamilton fort ===
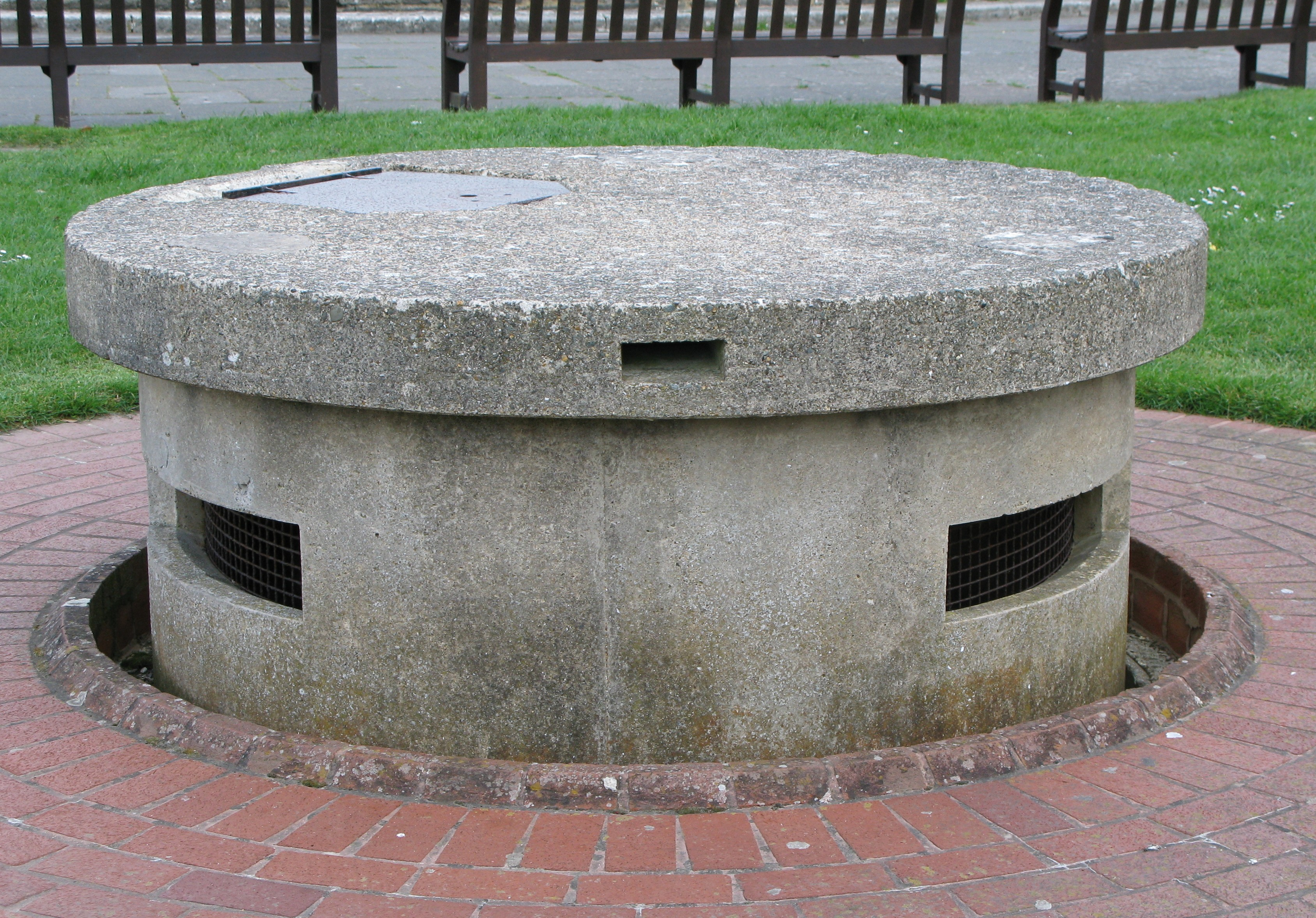
A Pickett Hamilton Fort in Southsea

The need to defend airfields presented special problems. Airfields were large open areas where any above-ground structure would present a hazard to aircraft. One solution was the Pickett-Hamilton Fort; this was designed to be lowered to ground level while aircraft were operating, but to be raised when necessary by means of a hydraulic mechanism. The fort was manned by a crew of two with light machine guns. Access was provided by means of a hatch in the roof. The forts were prone to flooding, and they were not sufficiently strong to bear the weight of the heavy aircraft developed during the war. 48 examples of this type remain extant, but a number of these are no longer in their original locations.

=== Allan Williams Turret ===
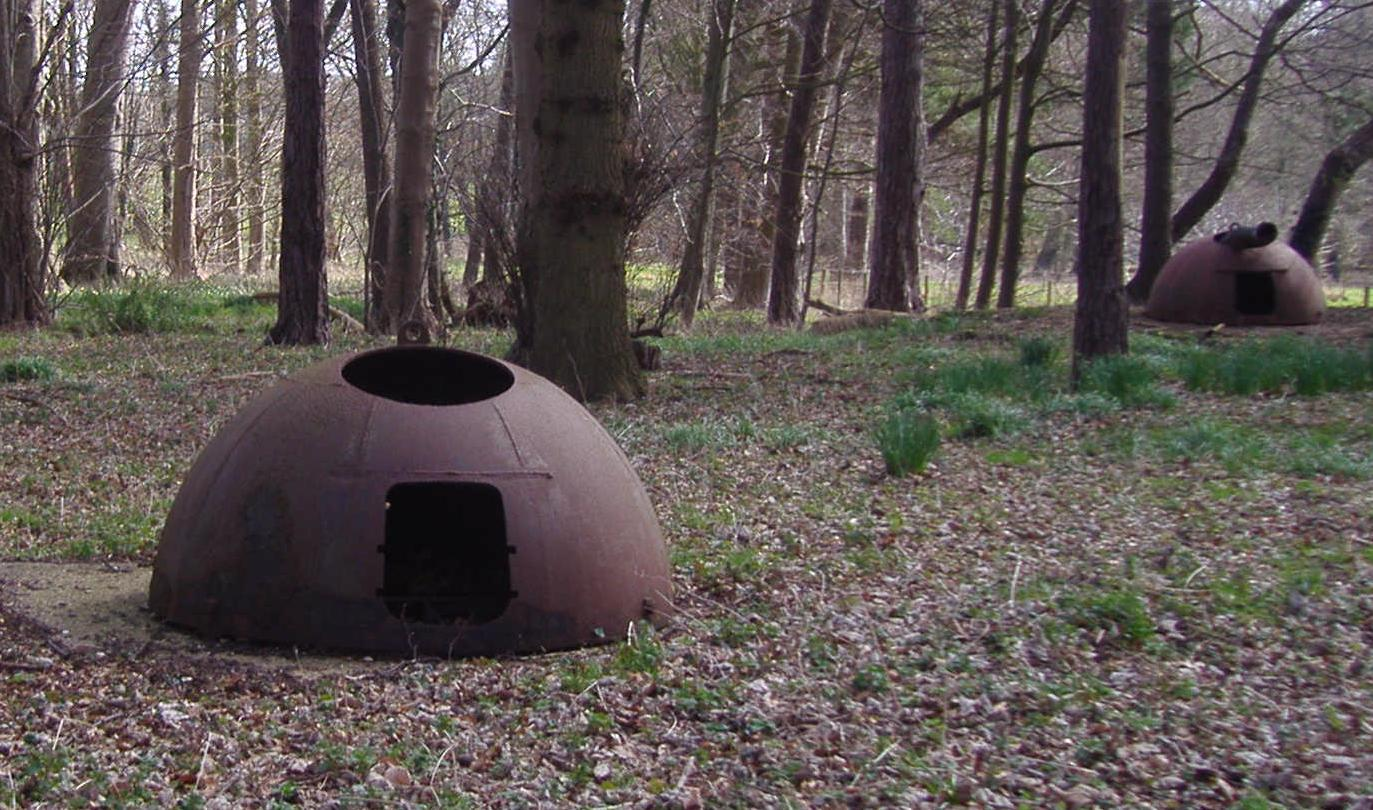
Two extant Allan Williams Turrets, Cockley Cley Hall, Norfolk

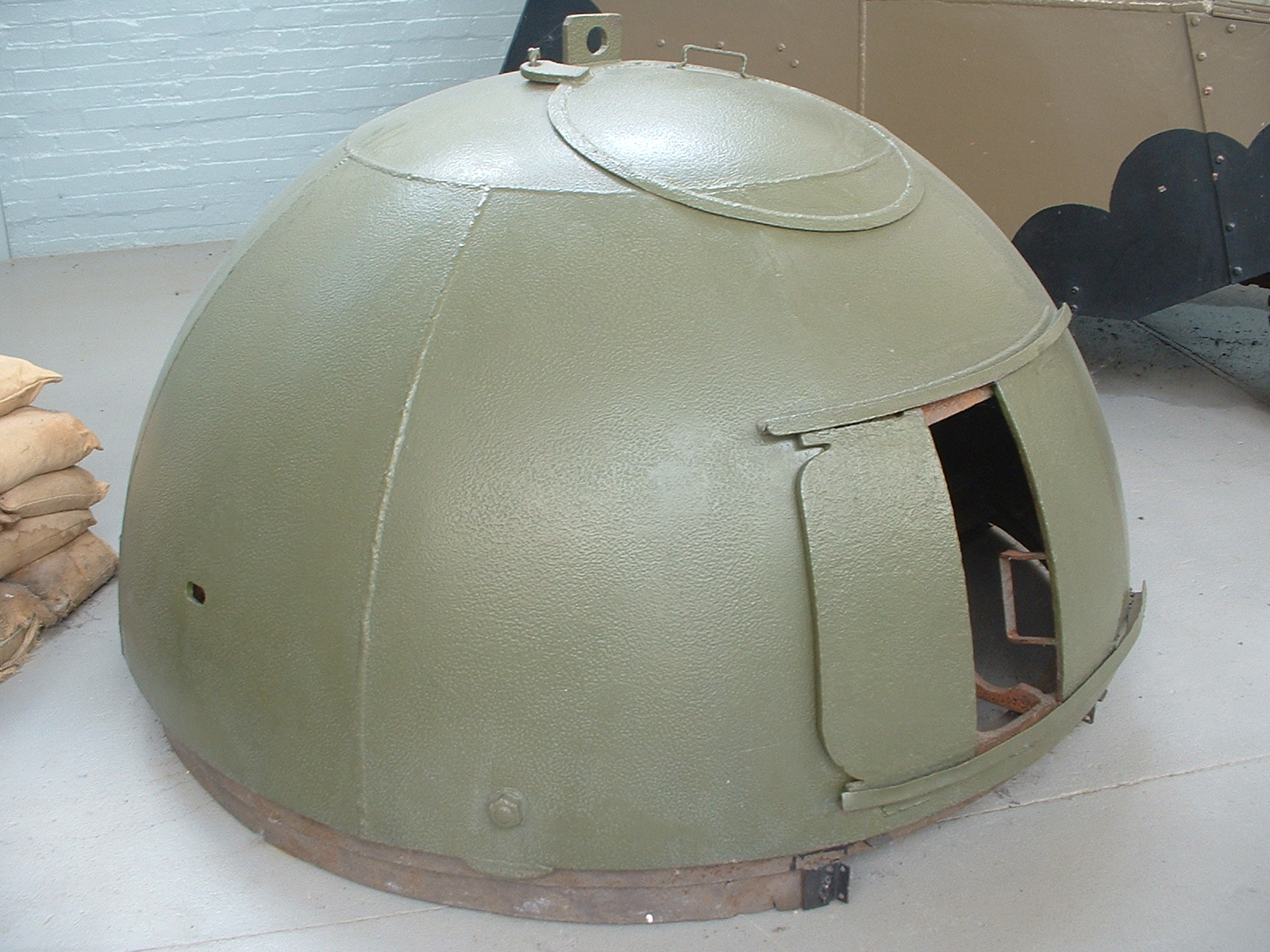
Cupola of an Allan Williams Turret, Imperial War Museum Duxford

A pillbox formed by a metal turret, which could be rotated through a full 360 degrees, set above a steel and brick-lined pit. It was designed for a machine gun to be fired either through the front loophole, which was further protected by shutters, or through the circular opening in the roof in a light anti-aircraft role. According to the manufacturer, it was suitable for Vickers, Bren, Hotchkiss or Lewis machine guns in either a ground defence or anti-aircraft role, or a Boys anti-tank rifle or rifle grenade for ground defence. Weapon change requires selection of appropriate bracket. The army did not favour the design – most were installed at airfields.

The turret was designed by A.H. Williams in conjunction with Colonel V.T.R. Ford and Lieutenant Williamson. Williams was the managing director of the Rustproof Metal Windows Company in Saltney, Chester, where the turrets were produced. The company had been engaged in war work since 1939, mainly manufacturing ammunition boxes for the Admiralty using a patented galvanising process. The turret had a garrison of two men or, if necessary, three men, for whom there were folding seats inside. One man could rotate the cupola, which was on roller bearings and required 15 lb of force to move it.

According to the manufacturer, four men could dig the position out and erect the turret ready for firing in two hours and remove it completely in 30 minutes. Cost about £125.

Nearly 200 Allan Williams Turrets were made and installed, but the salvage of the metal after the war means that only 33 remain. Known survivors include: two at North Weald Redoubt, Essex; one on display at the Imperial War Museum, Duxford (recovered from an Essex village); one at Worbarrow Bay, near Tyneham, Dorset; one at Seacombe, Dorset; one, above ground but missing its sliding doors, in the grounds of Bayfield Hall, Holt, Norfolk; one on the seawall at Cley next the Sea, Norfolk; two at Cockley Cley, Norfolk; two at Bembridge Fort, Isle of Wight; one at Plymstock quarry, converted into a blast shelter for quarrying (now relocated to Knightstone Tea Rooms at the former World War II RAF Harrowbeer Airfield, near Yelverton, Devon); one at Exmouth seafront, Devon (re-located from docks); one at Builth Wells war memorial, Wales; two on display at Sywell Aviation Museum, Northampton; one at the former RAF Llandwrog near Caernarfon, and one at RAF Dishforth, Thirsk, in North Yorkshire.

=== Tett Turret ===
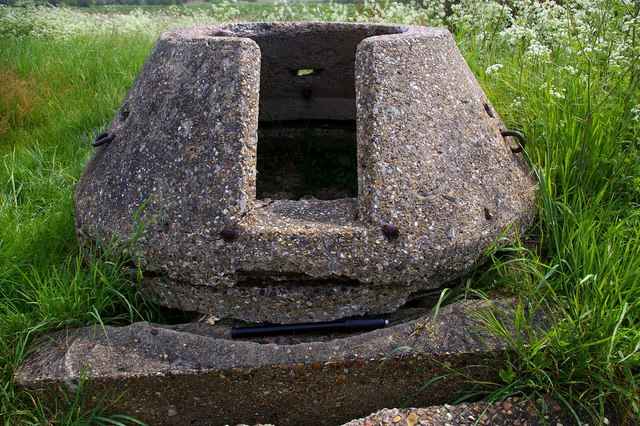
Surviving Tett Turret at RAF Hornchurch

The Tett turret was named after its inventor H. L. Tett, and manufactured as a private commercial venture by Burbridge Builders Ltd of Surrey. It comprised a revolving concrete turret mounted on a ball race that allowed it to be turned easily. The turret was set above a pit; in early designs, the pit was formed by a standard section of concrete pipe 4 feet (1.2 m) in diameter.

Only five examples were thought to remain, all at former RAF Hornchurch, but two well-preserved examples were rediscovered in 2014 in Docking in North Norfolk.

=== Spigot mortar emplacement ===
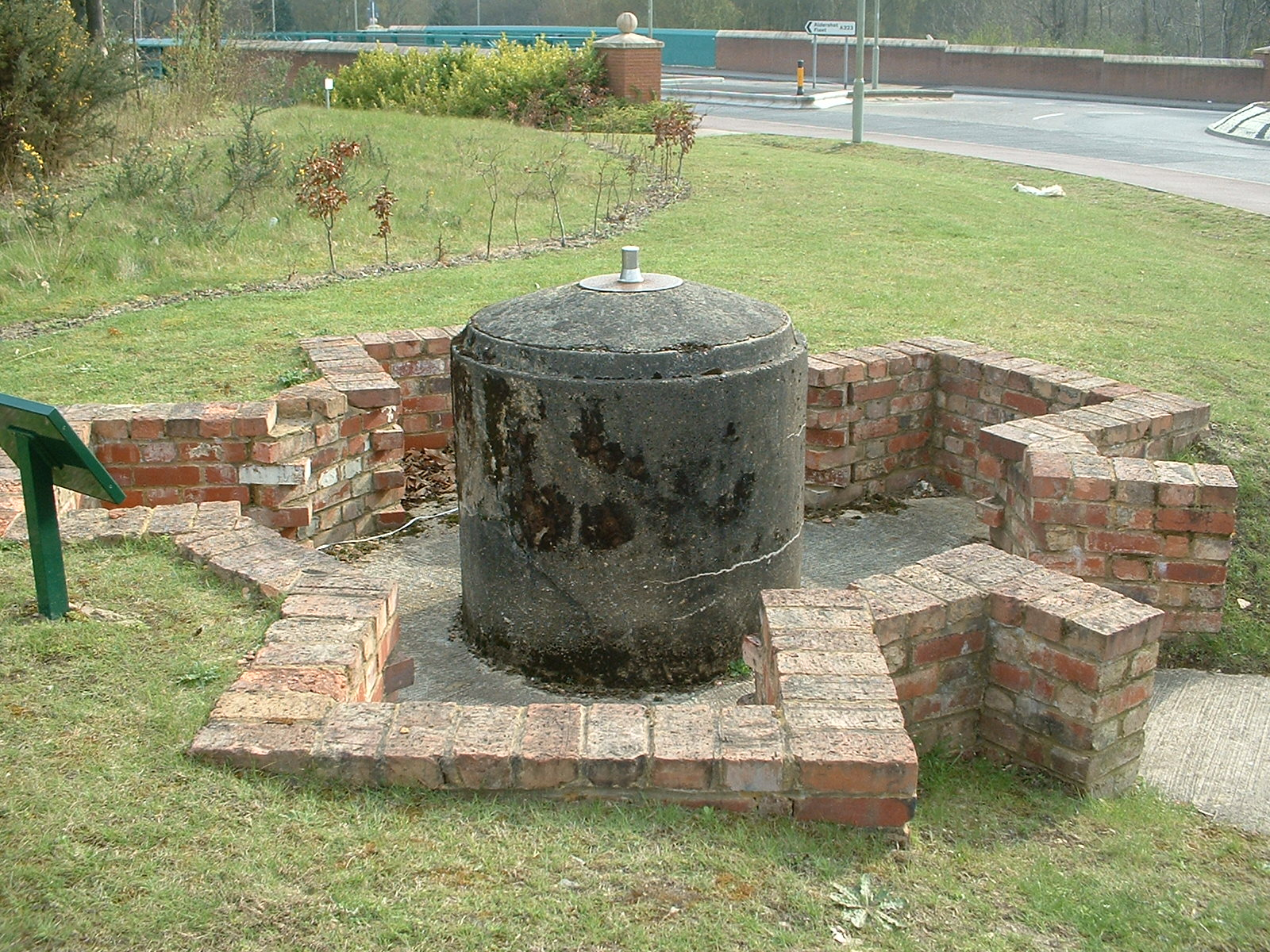
Spigot mortar emplacement (reconstructed around extant pedestal)

A spigot mortar emplacement was unroofed, sometimes constructed of brick or concrete, but sometimes a simple revetted earthwork. Its defining characteristic is a central concrete pedestal with a stainless steel peg (rust-free even after more than 60 years). The pedestal was for a type of spigot mortar called the Blacker Bombard — effective against both tanks and personnel at ranges of about 100 and 500 yards (90 and 460 m) respectively.

=== Loopholed walls and defended buildings ===
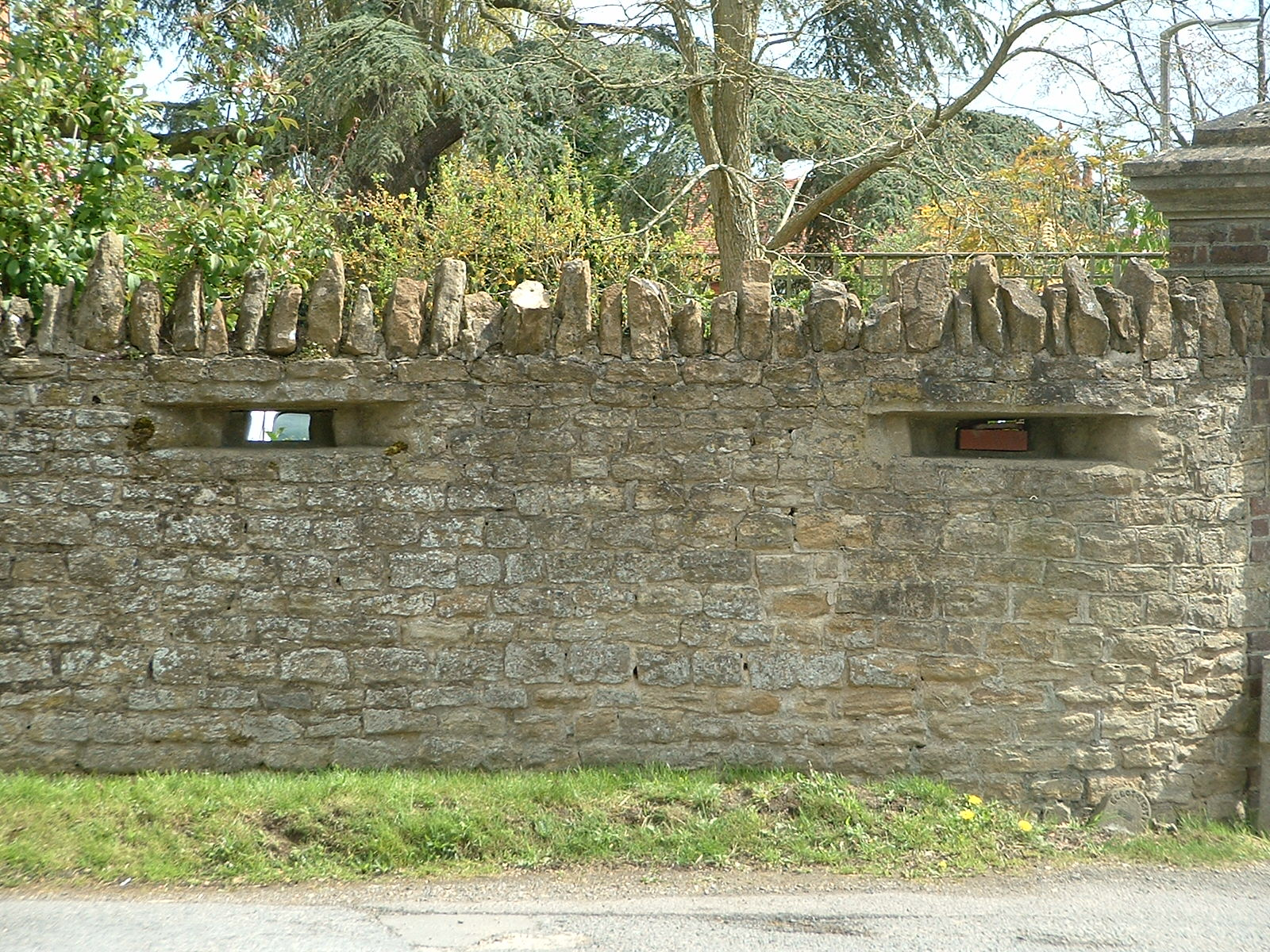
A loopholed wall

Existing thick walls and heavy buildings provided a ready-made alternative to a pillbox, and many were converted to defensive positions by the simple expedient of adding embrasures to them. Whatever might be lacking in protection was made up for by convenience and perfect camouflage. At Beaulieu, Hampshire, an existing dairy storage building was hardened for use as a fortification by thickening the walls and reducing the size of the windows to gunslits, retaining the original windows on the outside as a cover.

== Camouflage ==
Detailed instructions were given for the careful concealment of pillboxes and other field defences and all pillboxes would have been camouflaged. Many were dug into the ground or inserted into a hedgerow or hillside to provide the lowest possible profile; others had soil piled up on the roof and sides. Camouflage paint schemes and camouflage netting would be used to help break up the outline. Use was made of local materials: concrete made with beach sand, a covering of beach pebbles, or stone from a nearby cliff was not only a time-saving measure but aided camouflage by helping the defences to merge into the background.

Artists Roland Penrose (author of the Home Guard Manual of Camouflage), Stanley William Hayter, Julian Trevelyan and many others were employed to conceal defences. In built-up areas, pillboxes were disguised to look like a part of an adjacent building, carefully matched and provided with a roof to look as if they had always been there. In extreme cases, they were built inside existing buildings.

Some pillboxes were carefully constructed to resemble a quite different, innocent, structure: a haystack, a disused cottage, seaside kiosk, bus-stop shelter or railway signal box. It was not uncommon for pillboxes to be fitted with a dummy pitched roof to aid the deception. Some of these disguises bordered on the fanciful.

In some cases, the reinforced concrete roof was sculpted to make the distinctive form of a pillbox less obvious from the air.

Along part of the Taunton stopline in Somerset, due to the shortage of material available, six pillboxes were coated with a mixture of cow manure and mud topped with straw as a form of natural concealment. Close to Axminster, a square pillbox was disguised as a Romany caravan. During the summer months, a scarecrow "family" and a horse made of straw were dressed and suitably arranged around the caravan to visually disguise the fact that it was actually a manned pillbox.

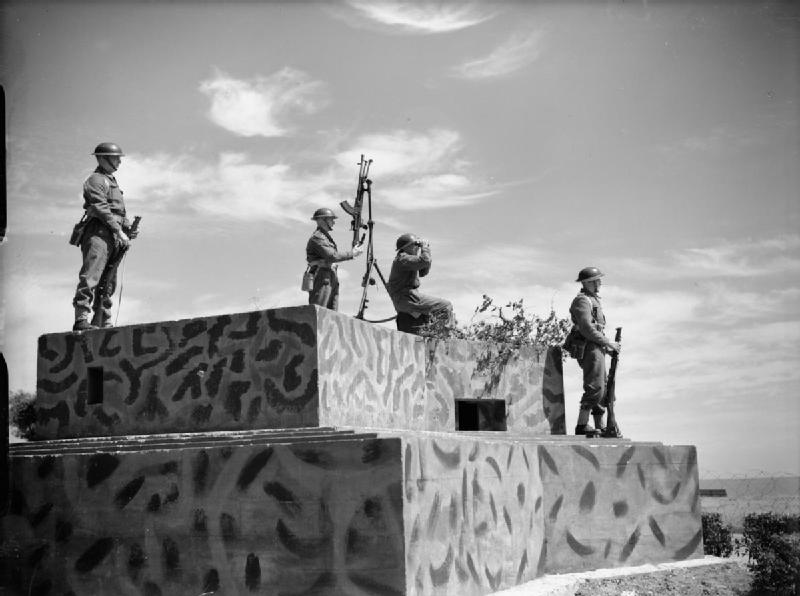
Coastal pillbox with camouflage paint scheme in July 1940

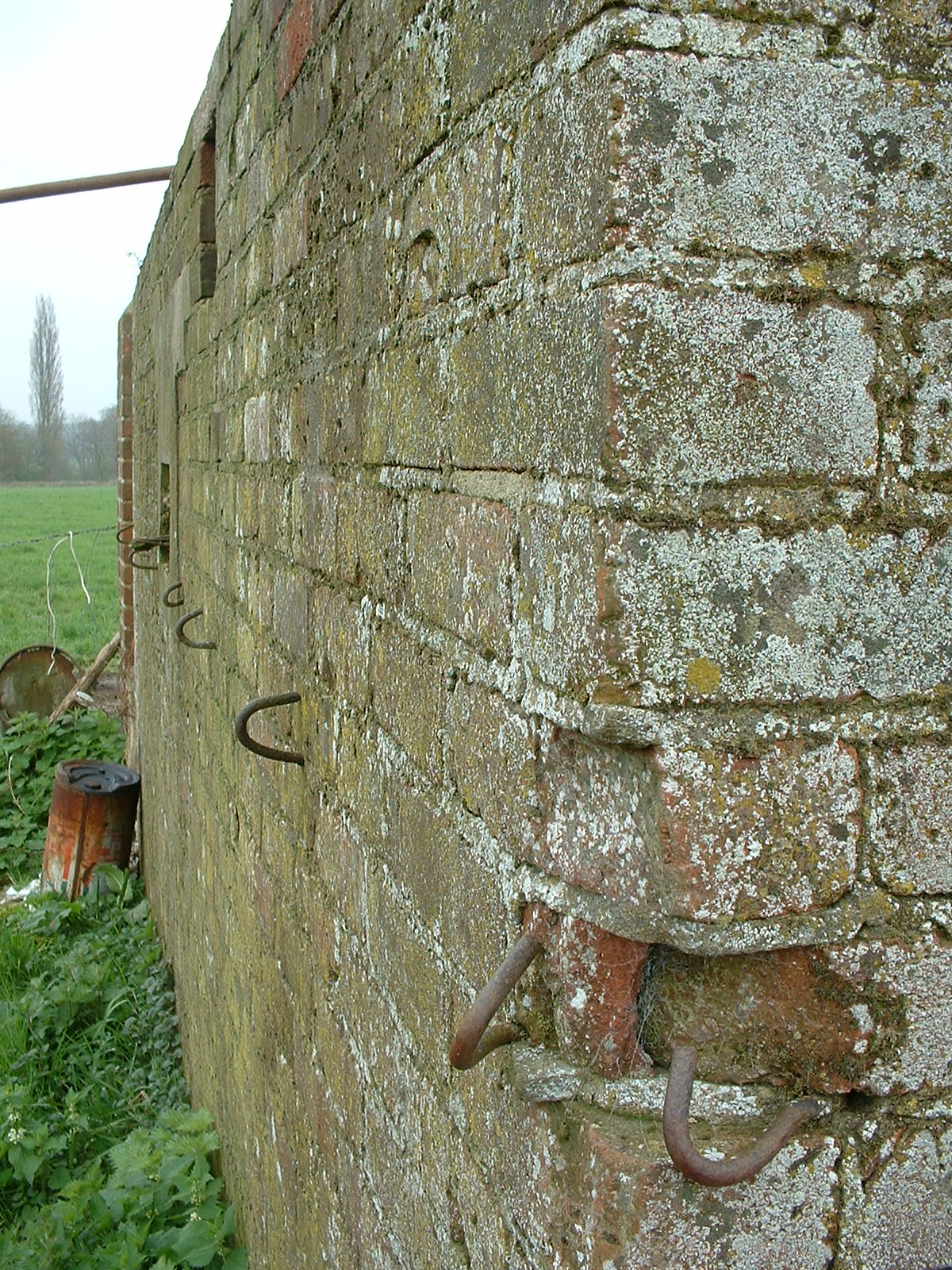
Hooks for camouflage netting on a pillbox at Hancocks Farm, Crookham Village, Hampshire

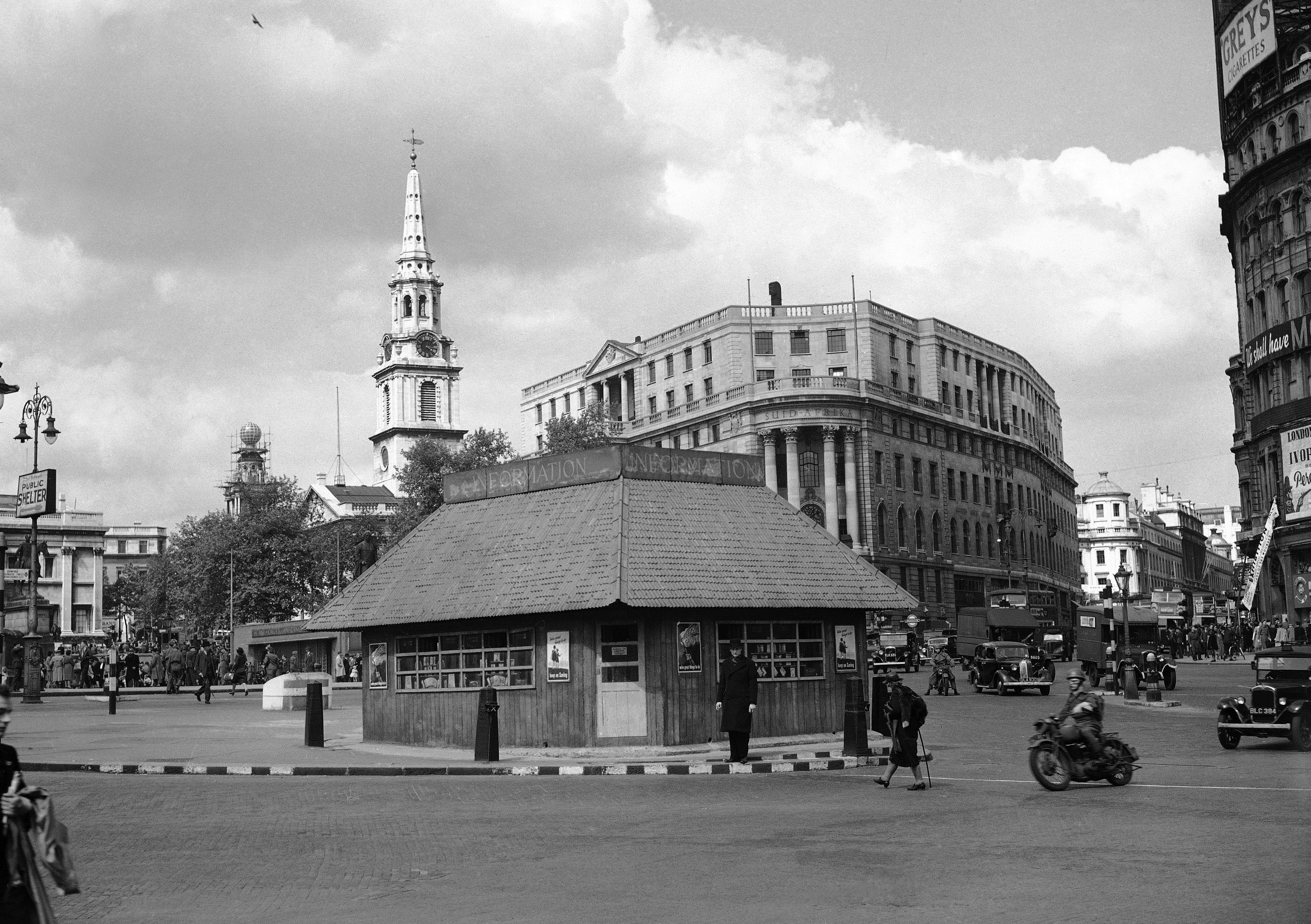
Pillbox in Trafalgar Square, London, disguised as a tourist information booth

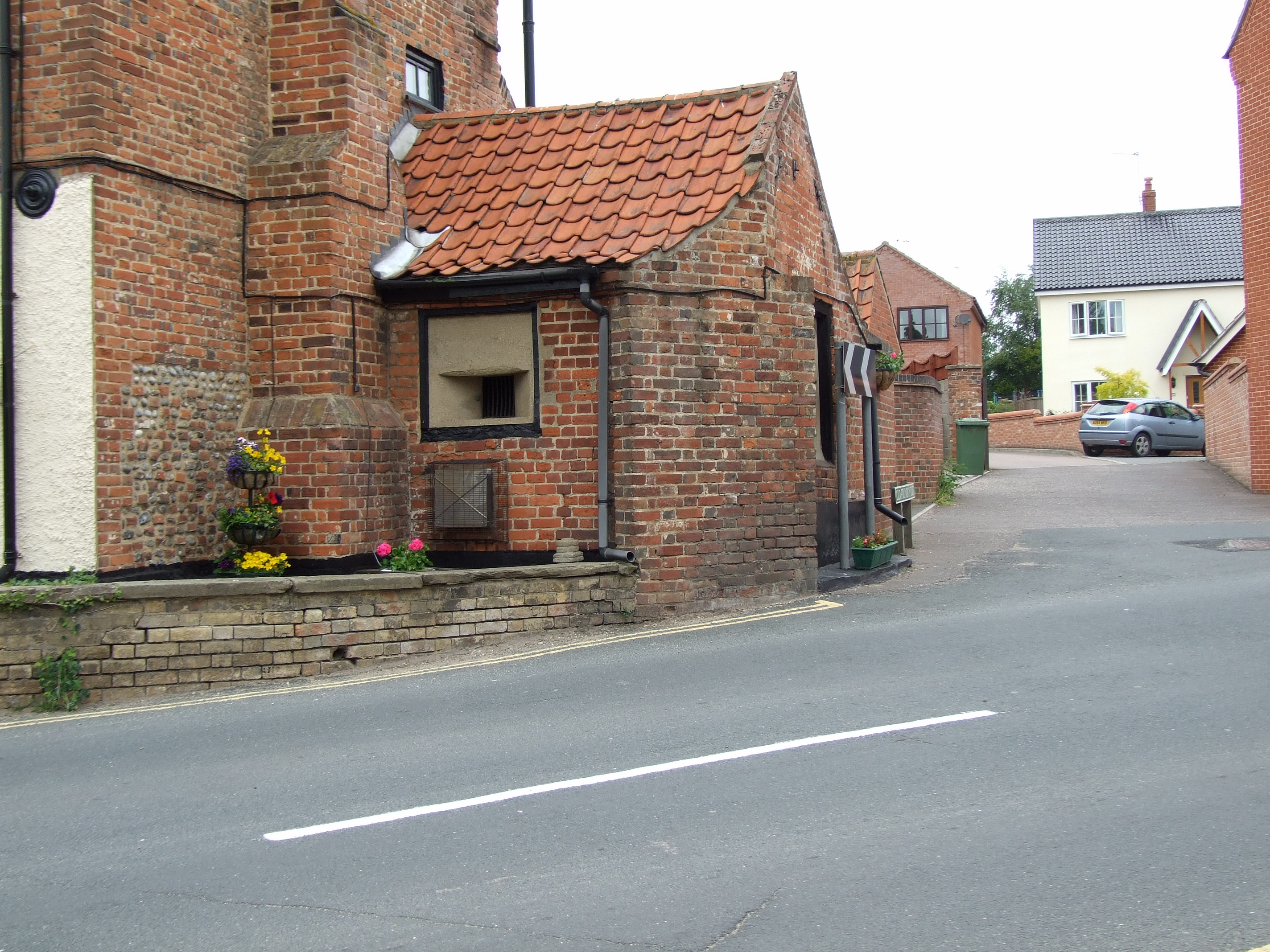
Extant pillbox at Acle, Norfolk (Grid reference TG4015310586), carefully blended with the adjacent building

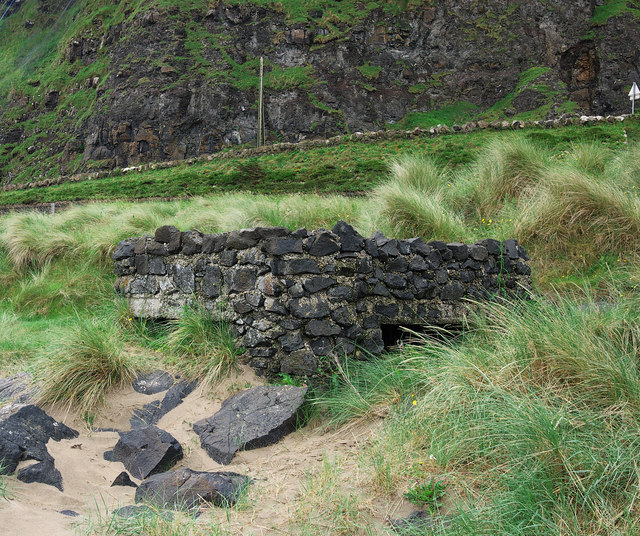
Pillbox at Downhill Strand, County Londonderry, disguised as dry stone walling

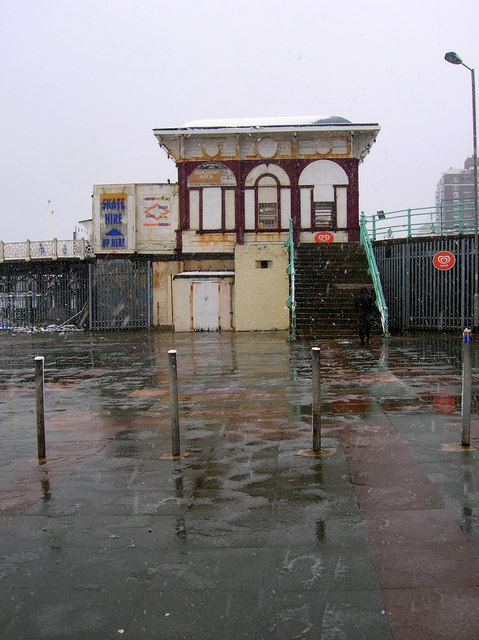
Pillbox at Brighton built into the side of a seafront sweet shop

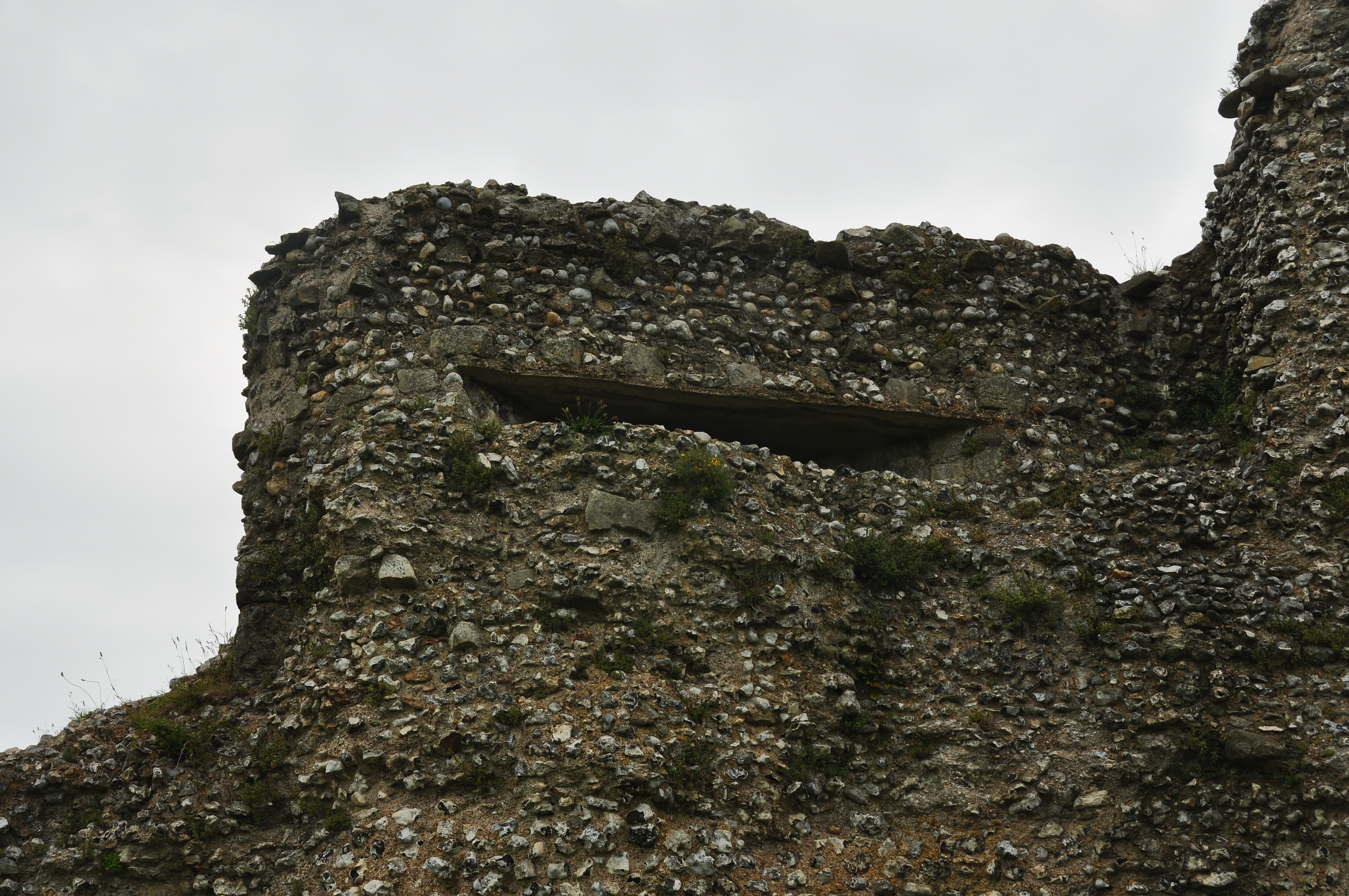
Pillbox built into the ruins of Pevensey Castle in East Sussex

== Destruction, neglect, rediscovery and reuse ==
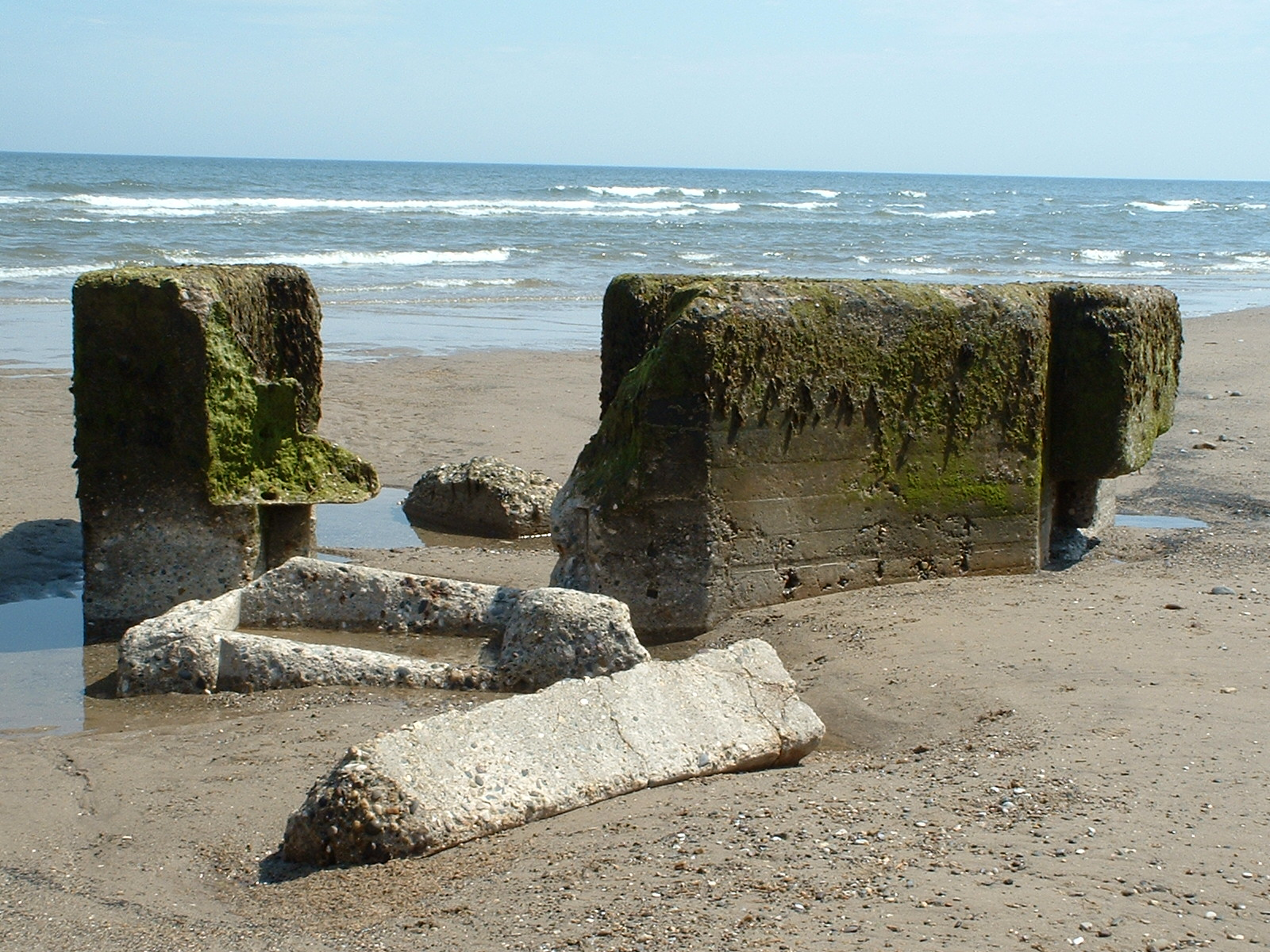
Pillbox overturned and almost destroyed by coastal erosion

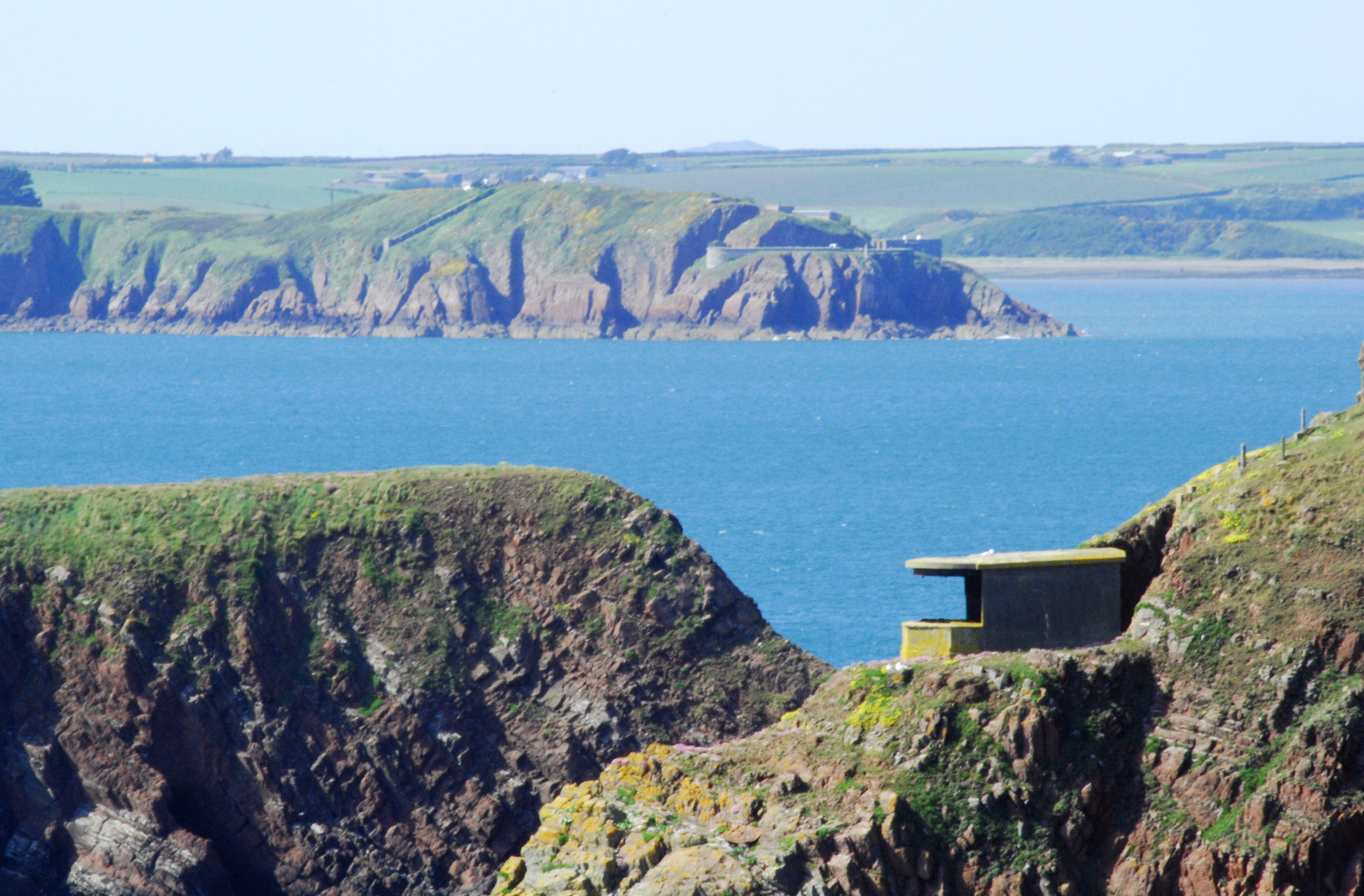
Gun Shelter on National Trust land near Angle, Pembrokeshire

The great majority of Britain's static defences have been destroyed, a process that started even before the end of the war. Ditches and trenches have been filled, loopholes repaired, wood and metal recycled.

In addition to receiving compensation, farmers whose land was used to build the structures were paid after the war to fill in ditches and trenches and to demolish pillboxes. Today, hardly anything remains of the anti-tank ditches, but at the time they must have been the most conspicuous of all the fortifications. A few remain, much humbled, as field drains or field boundaries, whereas others can be seen only as crop marks.

Today, it is very rare to find any part of Britain's defences other than those composed of concrete. Immediately after the war, there were more pressing matters to attend to than conserving the detritus of a battle that never happened. For decades, with the sole exception of Pevensey Castle—where the new fortifications were seen as a part of the building's history—there was never even a suggestion that anything should be deliberately conserved.

As the years passed, erosion and modern construction destroyed many structures. At the coast, fortifications have tumbled into the sea or sunk into the sands on which they were built; yet other features have succumbed to road improvements or have been demolished to make way for other modern developments. For many of those that remain, neglect and the attentions of nature have achieved a degree of camouflage greater than that during the Second World War.

Years after the war, memories faded, and in the public mind it became popular to assume that the few pillboxes and other concrete objects that could easily be seen were all that was done to defend Britain; that their purpose was just to bolster morale and that there would have been no realistic hope of resisting a German assault. Even the Home Guard came to be seen as something of a joke, as exemplified by the BBC sitcom Dad's Army. However, what can be seen today are just the most visible and robust remains of a massive programme of fortification undertaken in a very short period.

Extant wartime records were thought to be fairly poor, and nobody could be sure how many pillboxes and related hardened field defences had survived—or indeed, how many had been constructed in the first place. In the late 1970s, journalist Henry Wills began research on the topic, eventually publishing Pillboxes: A Study of UK Defences in 1985. Interest was stimulated, both public and professional, and local surveys were carried out. These surveys culminated in the Defence of Britain Project, which took place from 1995 to 2002, attempting to record all known military defence sites. From this and other surveys, it is estimated that some 28,000 pillboxes and other hardened field fortifications were constructed in the United Kingdom, of which about 6,500 still survive. The project also resulted in the discovery of many relevant records.

For many pillboxes, a new use has been found. The Type 28s, being internally spacious and having a large rear entrance, are probably the most amenable to reuse, and on farms and in gardens they serve as cattle sheds and storage lockers. Other, more imaginative, pillbox applications recorded include use as a pub cellar, a conversion to a ladies' toilet, and an open-air theatre box office.

Some pillboxes have been converted to make roosts for bats. Pillboxes that are well dug-in and thick-walled are naturally damp and provide a stable thermal environment that is required by bats that would otherwise hibernate in caves. With a few minor modifications, suitable pillboxes can be converted to artificial caves for bats.

== See also ==
- Maginot Line
- Dymchurch Redoubt
- Eastbourne Redoubt Home of the Combined Services Collection
- British anti-invasion preparations of World War II
- Pillbox (military)
- The Gatehouse at Bonds Mill, former two-storey pillbox
