= Bridgwater Canal =

Bridgwater Canal may refer to:

- Bridgwater and Taunton Canal in Somerset, England
- Bridgewater Canal connecting Manchester and Runcorn in north west England

== See also ==
- Bridgwater Canalside Centre a community venue in Bridgwater, Somerset
