= Port of Bridgwater =

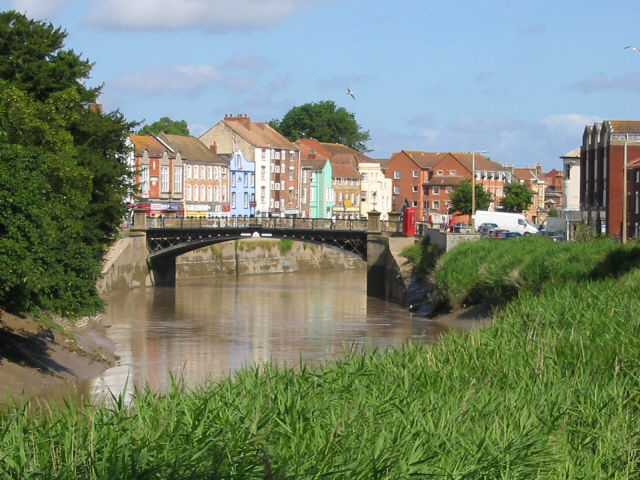
- A view down the River Parrett towards Bridgwater Town Bridge, which was the original highest navigable point, with care, by 400-to-500-tonne (390-to-490-long-ton) on the river
- Interactive map of Port of Bridgwater

Location
- Country: England
- Location: Somerset

Details
- Opened: Before 1348
- Operated by: Bridgwater Docks: Sedgemoor; Combwich Pill: EDF Energy; Dunball: Amey plc/AG Watts
- Owned by: Somerset Council
- Type of Harbor: Natural, located on the River Parrett

Statistics
- Annual cargo tonnage: 2006: 90,213 tonnes (99,443 short tons)
- Website; Somerset Council

The Port of Bridgwater is a port, originally located in the town of Bridgwater, Somerset, England. Created under the Bridgwater Navigation and Quays Act 1845 (8 & 9 Vict. c. lxxxix) it extends from Brean Down to Hinkley Point in Bridgwater Bay, and parts of the rivers Parrett (to Bridgwater), River Brue and River Axe. Although no ships now dock in the town, in 2001 103,613 (metric) tonnes of cargo were handled within the area of the port authority (compared to more than 200,000 tons (approximately equivalent to metric tonnes) in 1878), most of which were stone products through the wharf at Dunball.

== History ==
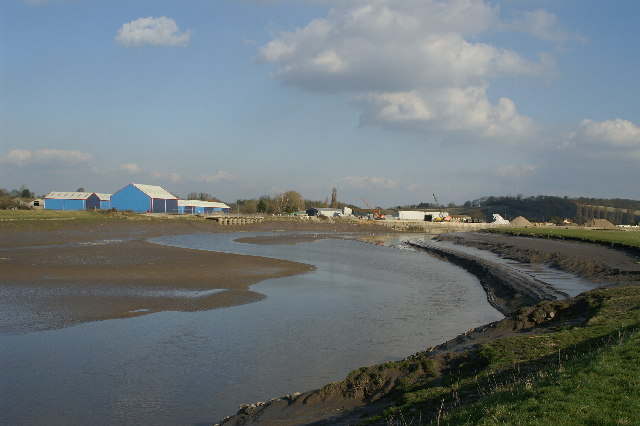
View upstream towards Dunball wharf, February 2006

=== Toponymy ===
The origins of the name of the town of Bridgwater are much debated by historians, with options coming from:

- Brigg, meaning quay
- Old English brycg (gang plank)
- Old Norse bryggja (quay), though this idea has been opposed on etymological grounds.

In the Domesday Book the town is listed as Brugie, but after the Norman invasion the land was given to Walter of Douai. Hence, as well as Burgh-Walter, an alternative version is that it derives from "Bridge of Walter" (i.e. Walter's Bridge).

=== Origins of maritime trade ===
What can be gained from the etymology of the town's name, is that Bridgwater has been a port of trade since pre-1200AD, when the first stone bridge was built within the town, which also marked the highest point of safe navigation for seagoing vessels. The town was the lowest practical crossing point on the River Parrett, although an alternate crossing via large stones at Combwich also existed but only at low tide.

The two major manors which controlled the town gained considerable revenues from the 11th century onwards from the imposed Lords water tolls. This led to the port being formally adopted as part of the Port of Bristol, allowing fees to be distributed there as well. Exports included:

- Wool: due to the volumes they controlled, the port allowed the Bardi family of Florence, Italy to make the town a regional collection centre for their wool exports.
- Agricultural products: mainly wheat, corn, beans, and peas to southern France, northern Spain, Wales, and Ireland.

Imports included herring, but were mainly made up by wine from Bordeaux, through which by 1330 the town had become a centre for victualling.

Bailiffs were appointed to collect appropriate taxes, tolls and berthing fees, and were also able to rent ropes and boarding planks to visiting vessels. However, due to the high tidal flow, merchants were able to avoid taxes by landing goods in the river, whereby a vessel would be purposefully beached downstream close to Combwich and manually offloaded at low tide.

=== Establishment ===
In 1548 the port was formally recognised in an act of Parliament, the Customs Act 1548 (2 & 3 Edw. 6. c. 22), covering 80 miles (130 km) of the Somerset coast line, from the Devon border to the mouth of the River Axe. This allowed locally collected taxes via the established custom house to be invested back into port development, with substantial stone quays built from 1424 onwards, on both sides of the river and located both up and downstream of the Town Bridge. Facilities included a dry dock and launching slips, meaning that during its entire operation the port has also built some 167 ships; the last one being the Irene launched in 1907.

The development of the port allowed the local cloth trade to expand, with over 100 cloth sheets exported each year from 1402 onwards, until the trade reached its peak in 1506, by which time it had become a statutory port. The average number of cloths exported per year during this period was in excess of 200. This expanded further in the 16th century, with most going to: Bilbao, San Sebastián, Fuenterrabia and Andalusia in Spain; Bayonne and Bordeaux in France; and half to the Irish ports of Cork, Dublin, Galway, Kinsale, Limerick, Rosses Point and Sligo, Wexford, Waterford and Youghal. By the latter half of the Middle Ages, Ireland also was the destination of over half of the beans and grain exported from Bridgwater.

By the 1590s imports had been erratic and depressed, with most of the ports trade going to (wool; cloth; agricultural products; food (cheddar cheese); cider), and from sister regional ports of: Bristol (glass); Cardiff (coal); Carmarthen (wood, metheglin); Dartmouth; Dorchester; Exmouth; Lydney (coal, salt); Melcombe Regis and Tenby. However, after this period export licenses were issued again in 1600s for trade to Ireland, France (salt and lime from La Rochelle), Spain, and Portugal, which doubled the traffic tonnage. By the 1670s Bridgwater registered vessels were running triangle-based routes, allowing them to operate directly in both French-Irish and English-Dutch trade routes.

By the 1700s, the local fleet consisted of 33 vessels totalling 1,000-tonne (980-long-ton), and employing 171 men. At the start of the century, import/export accounted for a third of total shipped tonnage, but stood at two thirds by the end. Exports remained focused around wheat, which was shipped locally to Bristol and around the West Country by coasters, and exported mainly to Madeira and Newfoundland, but with trade also to Gallipoli, Gibraltar, Virginia, and the West Indies. Return cargoes varied greatly, but were mostly made up of coal, culm, local food and wine, and a large trade in illegally imported spirit-based alcohol.

=== Canal and docks ===
==== Canal extension ====
The Bridgwater and Taunton Canal had been built from Taunton to a basin at Huntworth, to the east of Bridgwater, where it entered the River Parrett. The early years of operation were marred by a series of legal disputes, with connection to the River Tone at Taunton having been made forcibly by the canal company, and which were only resolved when the Bridgwater and Taunton Canal Company and the Conservators, who managed the River Tone Navigation, agreed that the canal company should take over the Tone Navigation. The arrangement also allowed a short extension to French Weir for junctioning with the Grand Western Canal, while the conservators were allowed to conduct an annual inspection of the canal, and to resume their ownership of the river if the canal was not maintained in good order.

==== Construction of docks ====
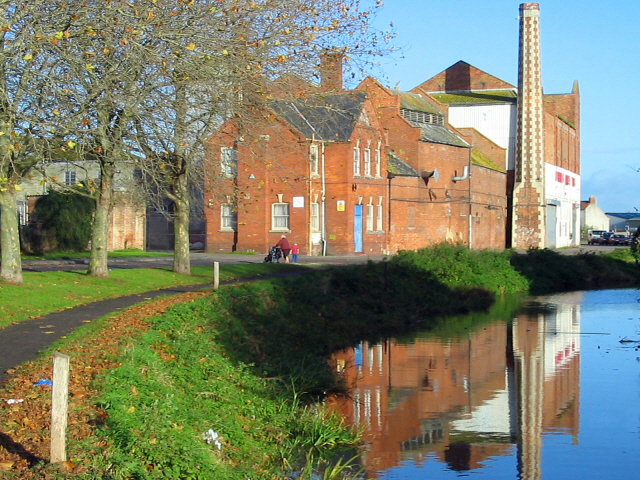
Bowerings Animal Feed Mill, located just north of the docks at the entrance from the Bridgwater and Taunton Canal. Today, it is the only commercial business operating within the preserved docks site

By the start of the 19th century, four companies dominated the ports trade: Stuckey and Bagehot; Haviland; Axford; Sully. Each were in constant demand to the Corporation of Bridgwater for better port facilities, who had commissioned a number of surveys to construct a floating harbour.

After the Bristol and Exeter Railway obtained the Bristol and Exeter Railway Act 1836 (6 & 7 Will. 4. c. xxxvi) to construct a railway which would pass through Bridgwater, to protect its trade the canal company sought their own act of Parliament to construct a floating harbour to the west of Bridgwater, and to extend their canal to join it. The Bridgwater and Taunton Canal Navigation Act 1837 (7 Will. 4 & 1 Vict. c. xi) was obtained on 21 April 1837, and the works were started.

Construction work involved a deep cutting from Albert Street to West Street, a short tunnel at West Street, and an inner basin that covered 4 acres (1.6 ha). A smaller outer basin covering 0.5 acres (0.20 ha) was connected to the inner basin by a lock and to the river by a ship lock consisting of a single 40-foot (12 m) gate, and a barge lock, consisting of a pair of 14-foot (4.3 m) gates. The whole outer basin could be used as a lock by larger ships up to 600 tons. The estimated cost of £25,000 for the scheme escalated to nearly £100,000, most of which was raised by mortgage.

The new facilities were opened on 25 March 1841, after which the basin and locks at Huntworth were filled in. Trade increased from 90,000 long tons (91,000 t) in 1840, before the harbour opened, to 120,000 long tons (120,000 t) shortly afterwards. Around 2,400 vessels per year were using the port by 1853. The canal company had hoped that the opening of the Grand Western Canal in 1838 and the Chard Canal in 1842 would increase traffic significantly, but their impact was marginal.

==== Canal takeover by railway company ====
The problem for the canal company was that the extension and docks had been paid for via a mortgage, and despite commercial success, the interest payments on the mortgage were crippling. In 1846 the company obtained an Act to convert the canal into a railway, although its powers were never used. Trade halved as railway competition increased, and the company was in the hands of receivers by the early 1850s.

In 1866 the Bristol and Exeter Railway stepped in and bought the entire stock of the canal company. The main attraction was the dock, with its large volume of coal traffic, but they purchased both the canal and the dock for £64,000, under the terms of an act of Parliament obtained that year, which included a requirement that there should always be "a good and sufficient water communication between the towns of Taunton and Bridgwater". Unlike many such acquisitions, the canal was seen as a useful adjunct to the railway network, and was maintained in good order for several years, with the Conservators of the River Tone continuing their annual inspections, and reporting any defects to the railway company.

==== Decline ====
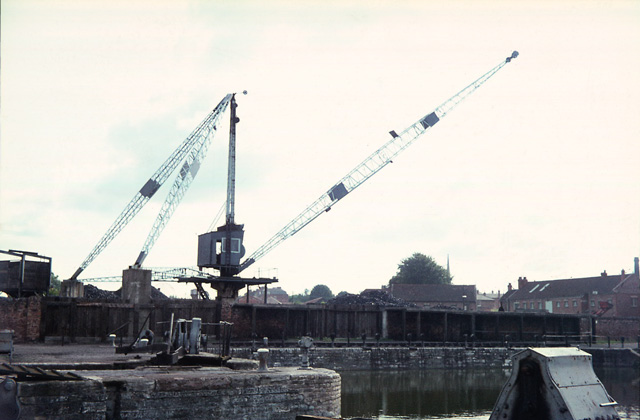
A crane located on the southside of Bridgwater Docks, 1968

The importance of shipping and the docks started to decline after 1886, the year in which the opening of the Severn Tunnel caused a severe drop in coal imports by sea. The situation worsened as the railways were extended into Somerset and beyond, and new steam-powered ships became too big for the port.

The last commercial boats used the canal in 1907, from Bridgwater dock to a wharf in North Town, Taunton, and the canal was effectively closed. The canal, which had by this time passed from the B&ER into the control of the Great Western Railway, had fallen into disrepair due to lack of trade by the beginning of World War I.

Control of the docks and canal passed into public ownership with the Transport Act 1947, both consolidated initially under British Railways. The Inland Waterways Association started to take an active interest in the restoration of the canal from 1952, but this was resisted by the British Transport Commission, who padlocked the lock gates to prevent them being used. Despite this, a team of seven men was employed to maintain the infrastructure through this period. The maintenance of the channel enabled the canal to become one of the first to be used for the commercial transport of potable water, which was pumped from the River Tone at Taunton and then transported via the canal to Durleigh reservoir for consumption in Bridgwater, from 1962 onwards.

==== Closure of docks ====
By the mid-1950s, the total Port of Bridgwater was importing some 80,050 to 106,800 tonnes (78,790 to 105,110 long tons) of cargo; mainly sand and coal by tonnage, followed by timber and flour. It was also exporting some 7,300 tonnes (7,200 long tons) of bricks and tiles. But the brick and tile industry was in terminal decline, and in the mid-1960s owner British Railways decided that they were commercially non-viable. Offered for sale to any buyer; however, with no takers, the last coal was imported on 31 July 1971.

== Berths and quays ==
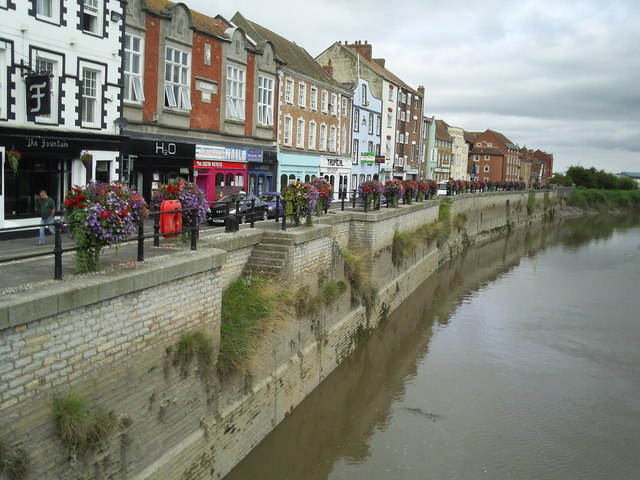
The former West Quay within the town of Bridgwater. Some of the buildings show Dutch architectural influence, showing how far regular trade routes led from the town

Although today all berths and wharfs are owned by Somerset Council, commercially they are operated by private owners via a leasing arrangement.

=== Town bridge and quays ===
The River Parrett was navigable, with care, by 400-to-500-tonne (390-to-490-long-ton) vessels to the site of where Bridgwater Town Bridge is now located. This allowed from medieval times onwards for Hamstone to be transported from Ham Hill to West Quay in the then village.

From 1200AD the first bridge was constructed, the lowest dry-foot crossing point on the River Parrett. After the formation of the Port of Bridgwater, quays to the east and west of the river were built in 1424; another quay, the Langport slip, was built in 1488 upstream of the Town Bridge. A Customs House was sited on West Quay, with some of the surviving buildings having Dutch architecture influence, showing how far regular trade routes led from the town. On East Quay there was a dry dock, launching slips and a boat yard. The quays were a trans-shipping point, with barges navigating the Parrett as far as Langport and (via the River Yeo) to Ilchester. After 1827, it was also possible to transfer goods to Taunton via the Bridgwater and Taunton Canal at Huntworth.

Due to the port, ship building was also an important industry, and around 140 ships were built during the 19th century by companies including David Williams, Joseph Gough, Watsons and William Lowther. F J Carver and Son owned a small dry dock on East Quay and constructed the last ship to be built in the town — the Irene. The former associated industry of rope making is commemorated in street furnishings and paving on East Quay and in the name of Ropewalk street.

=== Docks ===
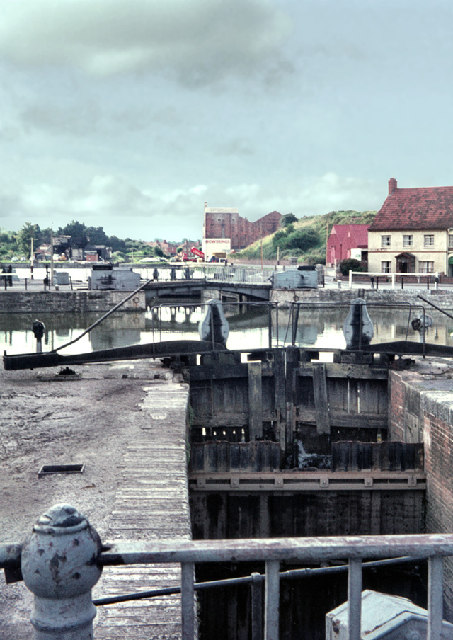
View across sea-locks across the virtually derelict Bridgwater Docks, 1968

A floating harbour, known as the "docks" was constructed between 1837 and 1841, when the canal was extended through Bridgwater to the floating harbour. The resultant excavated spoil material was stored on the north side on the docks site, creating what became known as the "mump". Much of the mump was removed in the 1980s to make way for the redevelopment on the north side of the dock.

The berths were accessed from the river via sea locks with a maximum size of 180 by 31 feet (54.9 by 9.4 m). From 1844 the docks had a steam-powered, cable-towed wrought iron drag-dredger, Bertha, similar to the one Brunel had designed for Bristol Harbour. The dock area contained flour mills, timber yards and chandlers. The docks opened on 25 March 1841, with volumes resultantly reaching a peak between 1880 and 1885; with an average of 3,600 ships per year entering the port. Peak tonnage occurred in 1857, with 142 vessels totalling 17,800 tonnes (17,500 long tons).

In the short term, the opening of the docks increased the profitability of the Bridgwater and Taunton Canal, which carried 81,650 tonnes (80,360 long tons) of cargo in 1840. This peaked in 1847 at 88,000 tonnes (87,000 long tons) of cargo; however, by the mid-1850s the canal was bankrupt due to competition from both the Bristol and Exeter (B&ER) and Somerset Central Railways. An end to the unequal competition came in 1867 when the B&ER purchased the canal.

==== Marina redevelopment ====
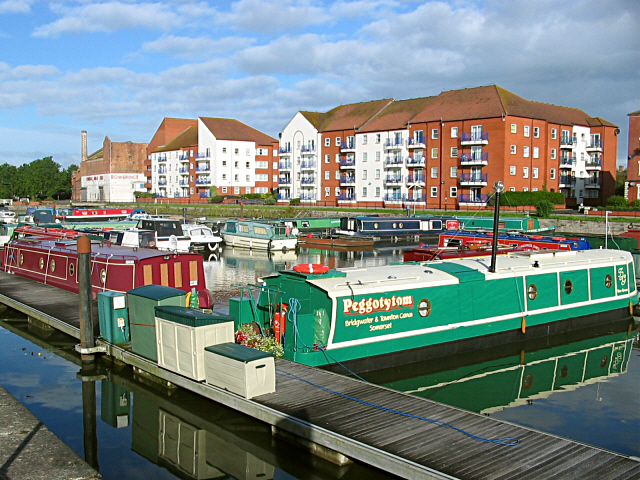
View across the modern Bridgwater Docks, a marina complex holding leisure craft

The Countryside Act 1968 provided a framework for Somerset County Council to start the restoration of the canal as a leisure facility. The port was transferred in ownership from British Railways to Sedgemoor District Council (Sedgemoor DC) in 1972, who also became the recognised pilotage authority when the Pilotage Act 1987 came into effect.

In the 1980s Sedgemoor DC began redevelopment of the now abandoned docks area. The dock water area became a leisure marina, only accessible to the then being-rebuilt canal with no navigable connection to the River Parrett, as the canal still transports drinking water for the people of Bridgwater. The former B&ER railway bridge became macadam-covered, linking the A39 road more directly over the A38 and southwards towards Minehead, thereby avoiding passing through the town centre. Locally this also allowed easier access to the former quays, for their subsequent redevelopment as private housing.

Today the entire docks facility, including: the tidal basin; locks; quaysides; bridges and fittings; and the 1850s constructed warehouse, now converted into apartments; are all listed buildings. The only commercially active industry located at the docks is Bowering's Animal Feed Mill.

Canal refurbishment was completed in 1994, when the canal was reopened as navigable throughout. The towpath forms part of Sustrans' National Cycle Network route NCR-3 which connects Bath and Cornwall.

=== Clink Yard ===
The Clink Yard were a series of new wharves built to the north of the new Clink bridge. This was an industrial area, with brick and clay tile makers.

=== Combwich Pill ===
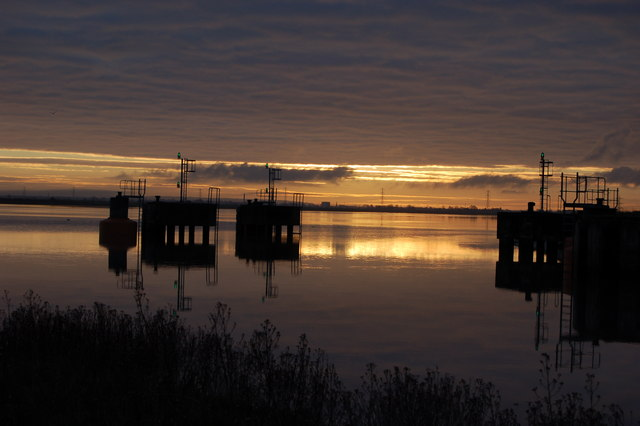
Combwich Pill harbour at dawn

Combwich Pill, a small creek near the mouth of the river, had been used for shipping since the 14th century. From the 1830s, with the development of the brick and tile industry in the Combwich area, the wharf was used by two local brickyards to import coal and export tiles to Wales and parts of Gloucestershire. This traffic ceased in the 1930s; and in the late 1950s the wharf was taken over and upgraded by the Central Electricity Generating Board (CEGB) to bring in heavy materials for the Hinkley Point A and later Hinkley Point B nuclear power stations. Construction of Hinkley Point A nuclear power station was ordered in 1957, with a scheduled completion date of 1960, but it was not completed until 1965. This was followed in 1967 by the construction of Hinkley Point B nuclear power station, which began operation in 1976.

Hinkley Point A nuclear power station closed for maintenance in 1999 and it was announced in 2000 that it would not reopen; it is currently being decommissioned. Two new power stations, Hinkley Point C nuclear power station, have been proposed by EDF Energy and an application for development consent submitted to the Infrastructure Planning Commission on 31 October 2011. Site clearance and preparation work, known as "preparatory work", has begun, but not construction work. With Hinkley Point B transferred into the ownership of EDF Energy, they now own the lease on the wharf.

=== Dunball ===
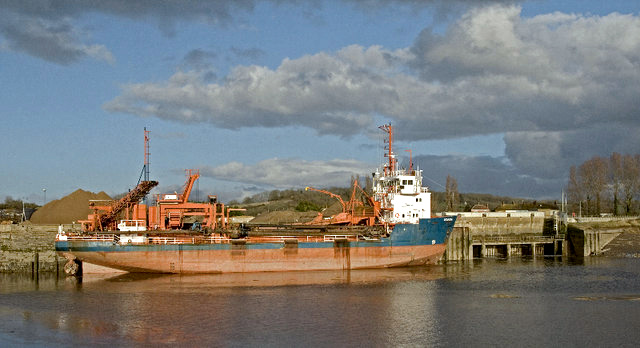
A cargo boat moored at Dunball wharf, being attended to by cranes and others machines, as it unloads its marine dredging cargo. To the right is Dunball clyce where the King's Sedgemoor Drain flows into the River Parrett

Dunball wharf was built in 1844 by Bridgwater coal merchants, and was formerly linked to the Bristol and Exeter Railway by a rail track which crossed the A38. The link was built in 1876 by coal merchants, and was originally operated as a horse-drawn tramway. In 1875, the local landowner built The Dunball Steam Pottery & Brick & Tile Works adjacent to the wharf.

Today, Dunball is the main wharf of the port, where Amey plc operate the main berth, handling aggregates imports. AG Watts Shipping lease the second berth handling agricultural imports/exports, building materials and the occasional passenger vessel, most often the PS Waverley and MV Balmoral on their annual summer visit.

== Linking transport ==
Both Bridgwater docks and the wharf at Dunball had during their peak operations links to the local railway system. Dunball wharf was linked to the Bristol and Exeter Railway (B&ER) via Dunball railway station, which had opened in 1873. Due to the flat nature of the local land, the B&ER branch lines were required to cross the A38 road on the level via road crossings, with the crossing at Dunball protected by a man with a red flag.

The Bristol and Exeter Railway Act had allowed for a branch to the river at Bridgwater, but this was never constructed. Instead, the Corporation of Bridgwater built a tramway from the B&ER's Bridgwater railway station to the Clink Yard wharves on the eastern side of the River Parrett. Crossing both the busy Bristol Road and Church Street on level crossings, it was opened in 1845 and worked by horses. The B&ER took over the tramway in 1859 and rebuilt it for locomotive operation in 1867. After construction of the canal extension and new docks, the former tramway was extended across the river via a "telescopic" bridge to the docks. The bridge was of an unusual design that had to move to allow ships to pass upstream at high tide; first part of the bridge was rolled aside and then the middle section was pulled clear of the navigation channel into the space vacated by the first.

The Somerset Central Railway (SCR) branch line from Bridgwater North railway station to Edington was opened in 1890. It closed to passengers on 29 November 1952 and to goods on 1 October 1954. On 27 June 1954 a new connection was made from Clink Yard to the S&DJR station goods yard, to allow goods traffic to reach the site after the closure of the former S&DJR Bridgwater branch line.

The Beeching Report in the 1960s saw the cessation of trains and subsequent removal of track from both sets of wharfs. Dunball railway station was closed to both passengers and goods in 1964, whilst the extension to the tramway branch was closed on 2 January 1967. Short goods trains still departed from Bridgwater railway station to service the timber merchants and engineering yards until the 1970s, when the tracks across the A38 were also lifted. The former Bridgwater North railway station site has been occupied for about 25 years by the J Sainsbury supermarket.

Today the residual stub-line acts as a loading and unloading point for nuclear fuel from Hinkley Point. The Parrett Bridge is still in position and serves as a footbridge but no longer moves. One of the last steam locomotives from the branch, ex-Cardiff Railway 0-4-0ST 1338 was taken to Bleadon and Uphill railway station for preservation but, following the closure of the museum there, has now been moved to the Didcot Railway Centre.

== Present ==
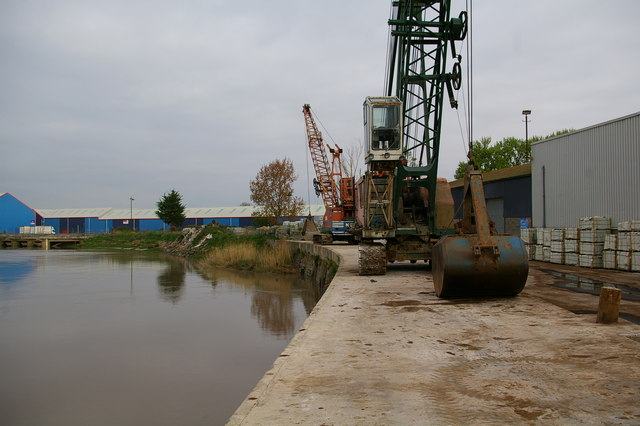
View along Dunball wharf, May 2006

The Drove Bridge which marks the current extent of the Port of Bridgwater, is the nearest to the mouth and the newest road bridge to cross the river. With a span of 184 feet (56 m), the bridge was constructed as part of the Bridgwater Northern Distributor road scheme (1992), and provides a navigable channel which is 66 feet (20 m) wide with 8.2 feet (2.5 m) headroom at normal spring high tides.

Although ships no longer dock in the town of Bridgwater, 90,213 tonnes (99,443 short tons) of cargo was handled within the port authority's area in 2006, with average cargo per vessel of over 1,300 tonnes in 2003, compared with only 400 tonnes in 1989. Sedgemoor DC acted as the Competent Harbour Authority for the port until it was abolished in 2023 and replaced with Somerset Council. They provided pilotage services for all boats over 98 feet (30 m) using the river since 1988, when it took over the service from Trinity House subsequent to the Pilotage Act 1987. Pilotage is important because of the constant changes in the navigable channel resulting from the large tidal range, which can exceed 39 feet (11.9 m) on spring tides.

Today most commercial shipping travels upriver as far as Dunball wharf, where the ARC wharf handles stone products, mainly marine sand and gravels dredged in the Bristol Channel. Marine sand and gravel accounted for 55,754 tonnes (61,458 short tons) of the total tonnage of 90,213 tonnes (88,788 long tons) using the Port facilities in 2006, with salt products accounting for 21,170 tonnes (20,840 long tons) in the same year.

The roll-on roll-off berth at Combwich, leased to and operated by Hinkley Point, is used occasionally for the transfer of heavy goods for the two existing nuclear power stations. With the possible future construction of the two Hinkley Point C nuclear power stations by EDF Energy, it is proposed that Combwich wharf be employed to transfer heavy goods to the sites. That will require that the existing berth is refurbished. Combwich Pill is the only site where recreational moorings are available in the estuary.

== Sources ==
- Dunning, R. W., ed. (1992). Andersfield, Cannington, and North Petherton Hundreds (Bridgwater and Neighbouring Parishes). The Victoria History of the County of Somerset. Vol. VI. Oxford: Oxford University Press for the University of London Institute of Historical Research. ISBN 0-19-722780-5.
- Farr, Grahame (1954). Somerset Harbours. London: Christopher Johnson.
- Fitzhugh, Rod (1993). Bridgwater and the River Parrett: in old photographs. Stroud: Alan Sutton Publishing. ISBN 0-7509-0518-2.
- Hadfield, Charles (1967). The Canals of South West England. David and Charles. ISBN 0-7153-4176-6.
- Hannah, Leslie (1982). Engineers, Managers, and Politicians: The First Fifteen Years of the Nationalised Electricity Supply in Britain. Baltimore: The Johns Hopkins University Press. ISBN 0-8018-2862-7.
- Haskell, Tony (1994). By Waterway to Taunton. Somerset: Somerset Books. ISBN 0-86183-260-4.
- Hawkins, Desmond (1982). Avalon and Sedgemoor. Gloucester: Alan Sutton Publishing. ISBN 978-0-86299-016-9.
- Harrison, J.D. (1990) [1981]. The Bridgwater Railway. Locomation Papers (LP132) (Second expanded ed.). The Oakwood Press. ISBN 0-85361-403-2.
- Lawrence, J.F.; Lawrence, J.C. (2005). A History of Bridgwater. Chichester: Phillimore. ISBN 1-86077-363-X.
- MacDermot, E T (1931). History of the Great Western Railway, volume II 1863-1921. London: Great Western Railway.
- Murless, Brian J (2000). Somerset Brick & Tile Manufacturers: A Brief History & Gazetteer. SIAS Survey no. 13. Taunton: The Somerset Industrial Archaeological Society. ISBN 0-9533539-2-3.
- Oakley, Mike (2002). Somerset Railway Stations. Stanbridge: Dovecote Press. ISBN 978-1-904349-09-9.
- Otter, R. A. (1994). Civil Engineering Heritage: Wales and West Central England. Thomas Telford Publishers. ISBN 0-7277-1971-8.
