= GHQ Line =

Defence line built in the United Kingdom during World War II

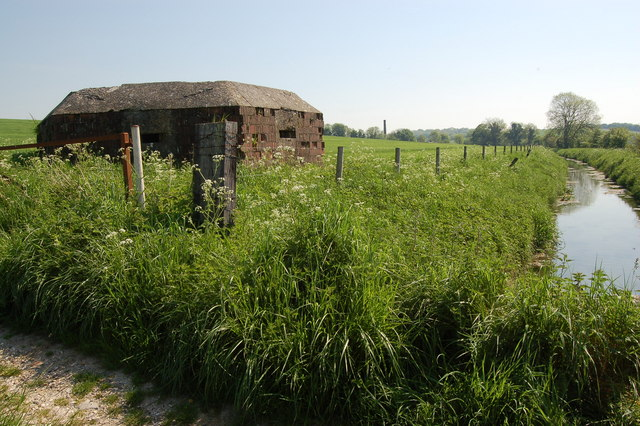
A FW3/22 type pillbox in Wiltshire, near the Kennet and Avon Canal

The GHQ Line (General Headquarters Line) was a defence line built in the United Kingdom during World War II to contain an expected German invasion.

The British Army had abandoned most of its equipment in France after the Dunkirk evacuation. It was therefore decided to build a static system of defensive lines around Britain, designed to compartmentalise the country and delay the Germans long enough for more mobile forces to counter-attack. Over 50 defensive lines were constructed across the country. After the coastal defences, the GHQ Line was the longest and most important, designed to protect London and the industrial heart of Britain, and was considered to be the last chance of defence.

The "green" section of the GHQ Line ran from the northern end of the Taunton Stop Line near Highbridge in Somerset, along the River Brue, across the Mendips from Wells and following the railway from Masbury into the Wellow valley. This joined the "blue" line which followed the Kennet and Avon Canal to Reading. The green line continued from Bradford-on-Avon along the river to Malmesbury where it met the "red" line which ran to Abingdon, along the Thames to Pangbourne and rejoined the blue line at Theale. The green line continued to Avening then down the valley to Framilode, protecting the strategic areas of Bristol, Avonmouth, and Sharpness. The eastern line was to run inland of the coast from Essex to Edinburgh but was not completed. London was protected by the concentric rings of the Outer London Defence Ring.

On the section of the line in Essex, between Great Chesterford and Canvey Island, the defences were made up of around 400 FW3 type concrete pillboxes, which were part of the British hardened field defences of World War II. Well over 100 pillboxes still exist on this section in 2026, with around 40 highly visible FW3 Type 22, 24, 26, 27 and 28 boxes between the Rettendon Turnpike and Howe Green, mostly alongside the A130 road. Many more FW3s are still in place north of Chelmsford along the Chelmer Valley and towards Great Dunmow.

== See also ==
- British anti-invasion preparations of World War II
- British hardened field defences of World War II
- British military history of World War II
- Coquet Stop Line
- Taunton Stop Line
- Tyne Stop Line

In other countries:

- Alpine Wall
- Maginot Line
- Siegfried Line
