= Bertha (drag boat) =

Steam-powered boat built in 1844

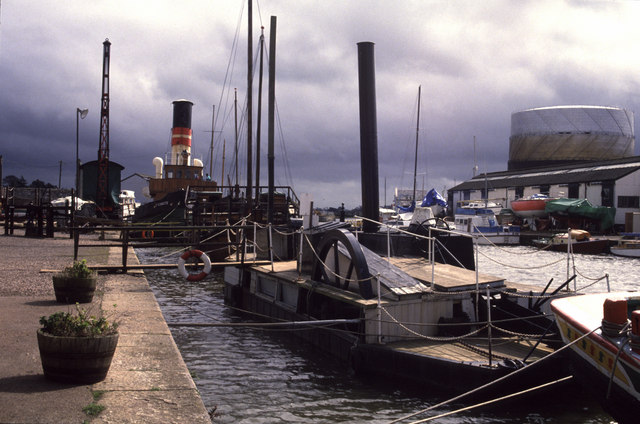
- Bertha at the Exeter Maritime Museum in 1989

History

- Name: Bertha
- Owner: Great Western Railway; British Railways; Exeter Maritime Museum
- Builder: G. Lunnel & Co, Bristol
- Laid down: 1844
- Status: Museum ship; Being restored at World of Boats at Eyemouth

General characteristics
- Tonnage: 60^{a}
- Length: 50 feet (15 m)
- Beam: 15.5 feet (4.7 m)

Bertha is a steam-powered boat built in 1844 to remove silt from the Port of Bridgwater in Somerset, England. It is the oldest operational steam vessel in Britain, and possibly in the world. It is part of the National Historic Fleet.

The boat was built, of riveted iron, in Bristol by G. Lunnel & Co, copying a design by John McLean, and developed by Isambard Kingdom Brunel to deal with silt in the Floating Harbour. It is a bed leveler or plough dredger, with a large metal blade, which could be lowered at the stern of the boat, below the water, similar to a bulldozer on land.

Bertha is 50 feet (15 m) long and 15.5 feet (4.7 m) wide, with a tonnage of 60 tons.^{a} The power is from a coal-fired single-cylinder steam engine providing steam at 40 pounds per square inch (280 kPa). A large flywheel and drive shaft drove a single-reduction spur wheel drive. It moved by being pulled along chains anchored on the quay.

Bertha worked in Bridgwater Docks, after the connection of the Bridgwater and Taunton Canal to the River Parrett, from 1844 until 1969. The vessel was initially owned by the Great Western Railway and then British Railways. She was then taken to the Exeter Maritime Museum, where she was shown working with the help of John Selby (welder and fabricator in Spaxton, Somerset). In 1997 it moved to the World of Boats at Eyemouth, where it was restored. The Eyemouth Maritime Museum closed and Bertha is now in Bristol, but not on public display.

== Notes ==
1.^a It is unclear which type of ton is being referred to in the sources where a tonnage of 60 is reported. Gross register tonnage (GRT) represents the total internal volume of a vessel, where one register ton is equal to a volume of 100 cubic feet (2.83 m3)
