= Coquet Stop Line =

Historic defensive structures in Northumberland

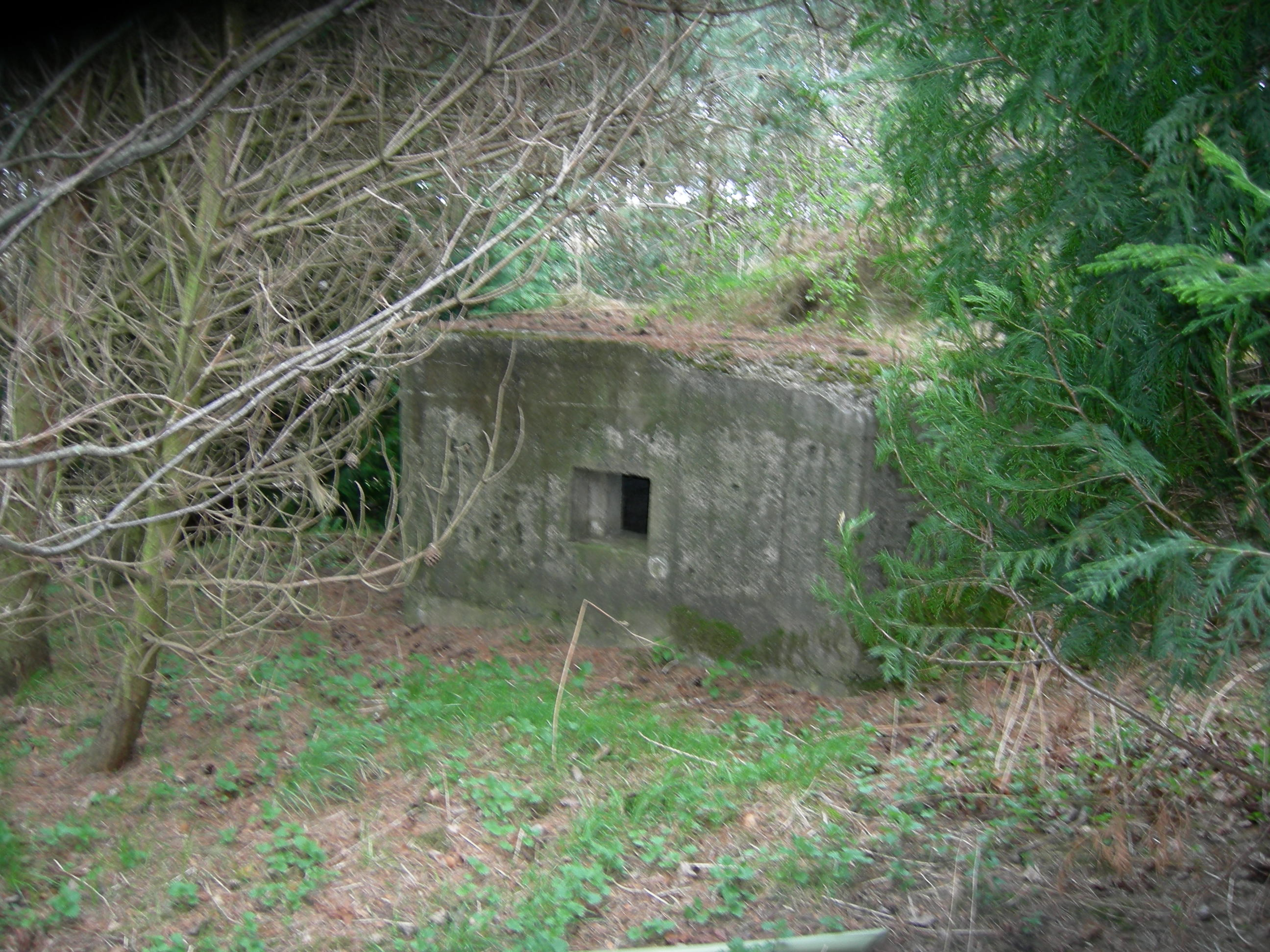
Pillbox P305 Catheugh Plantation from the south side, obscured by trees planted since the war

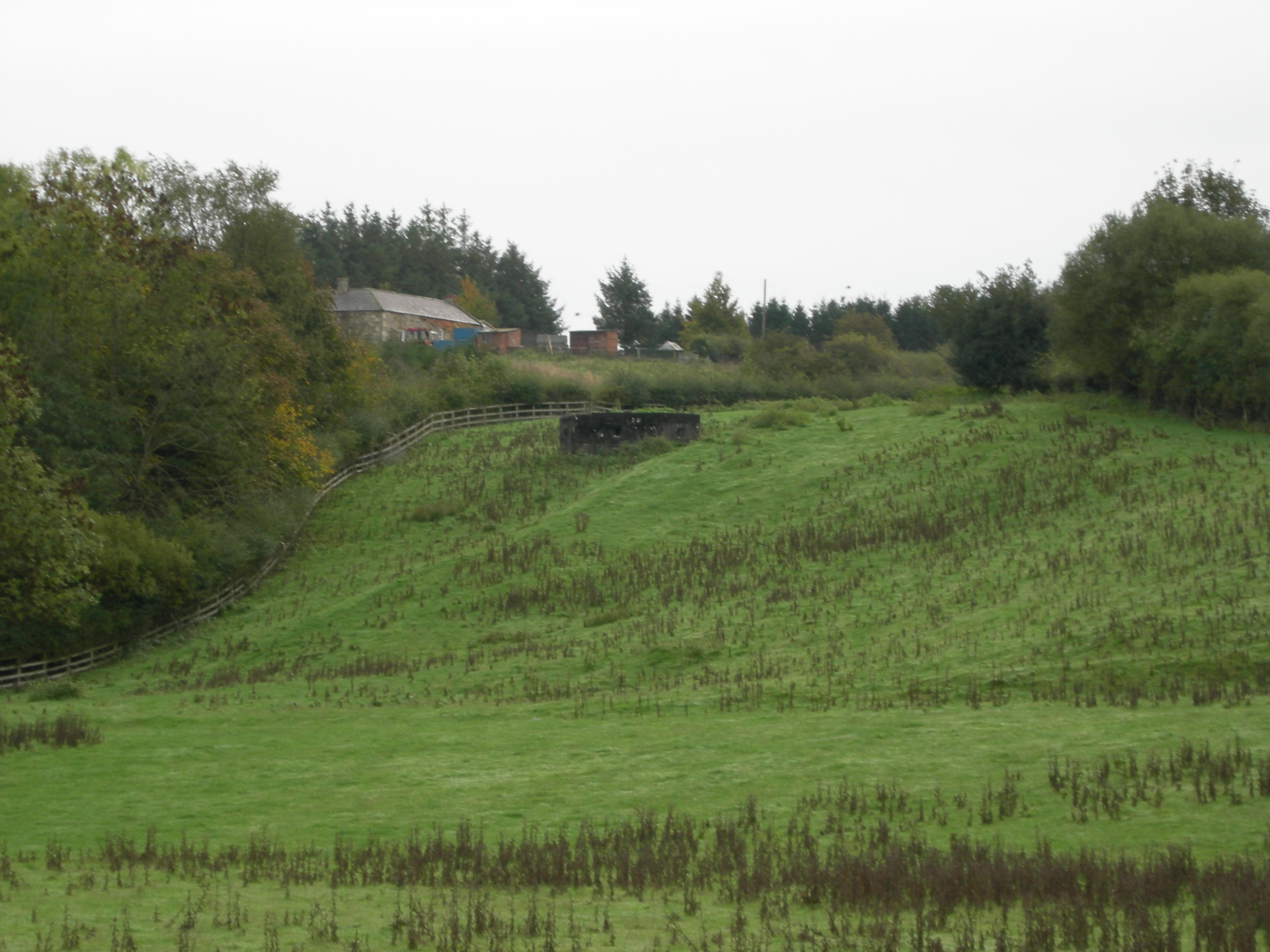
Pillbox P306 Weldon Bridge from the former A697, looking south-east

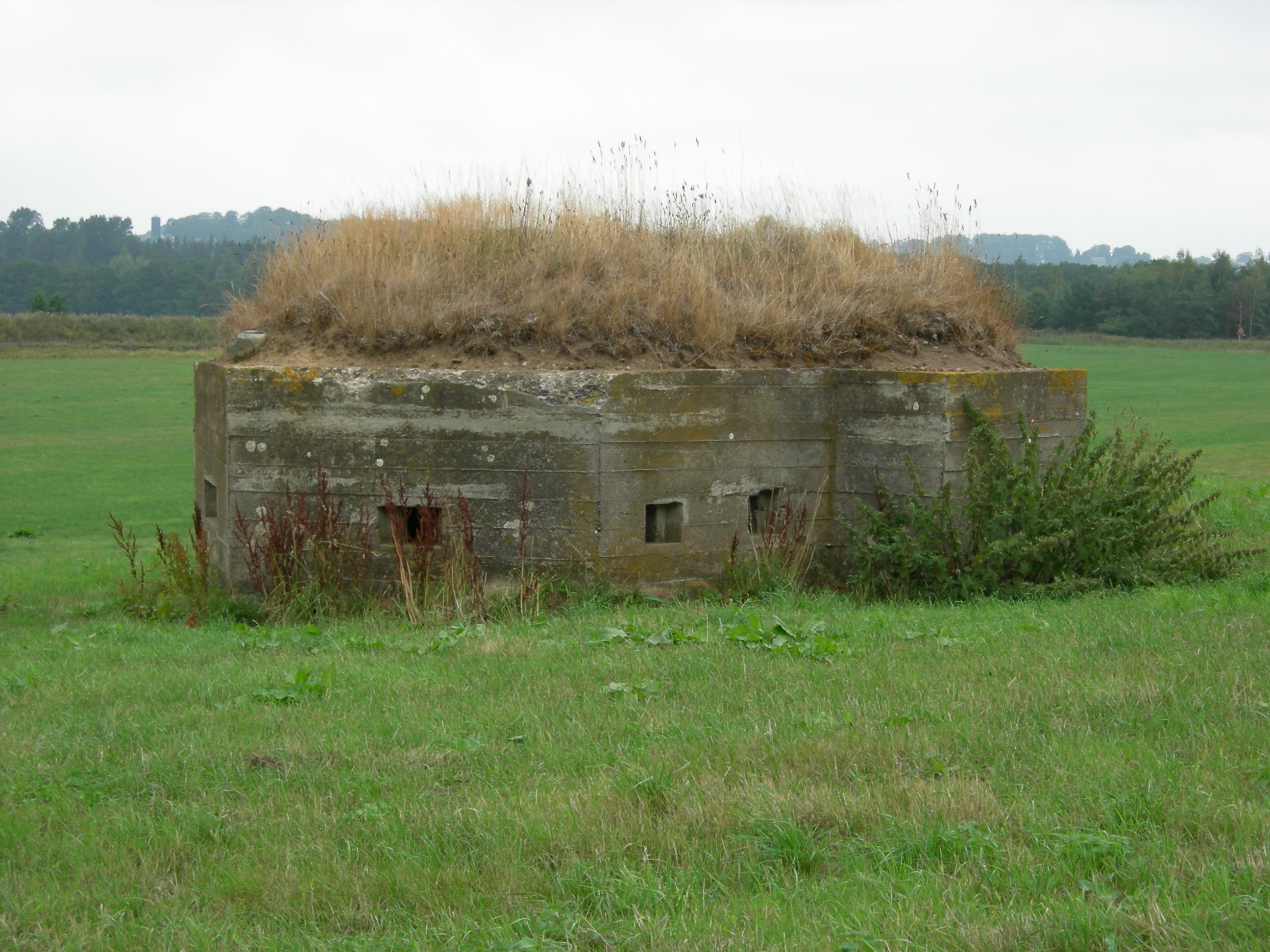
Pillbox P319 Bickerton from a minor road, looking east

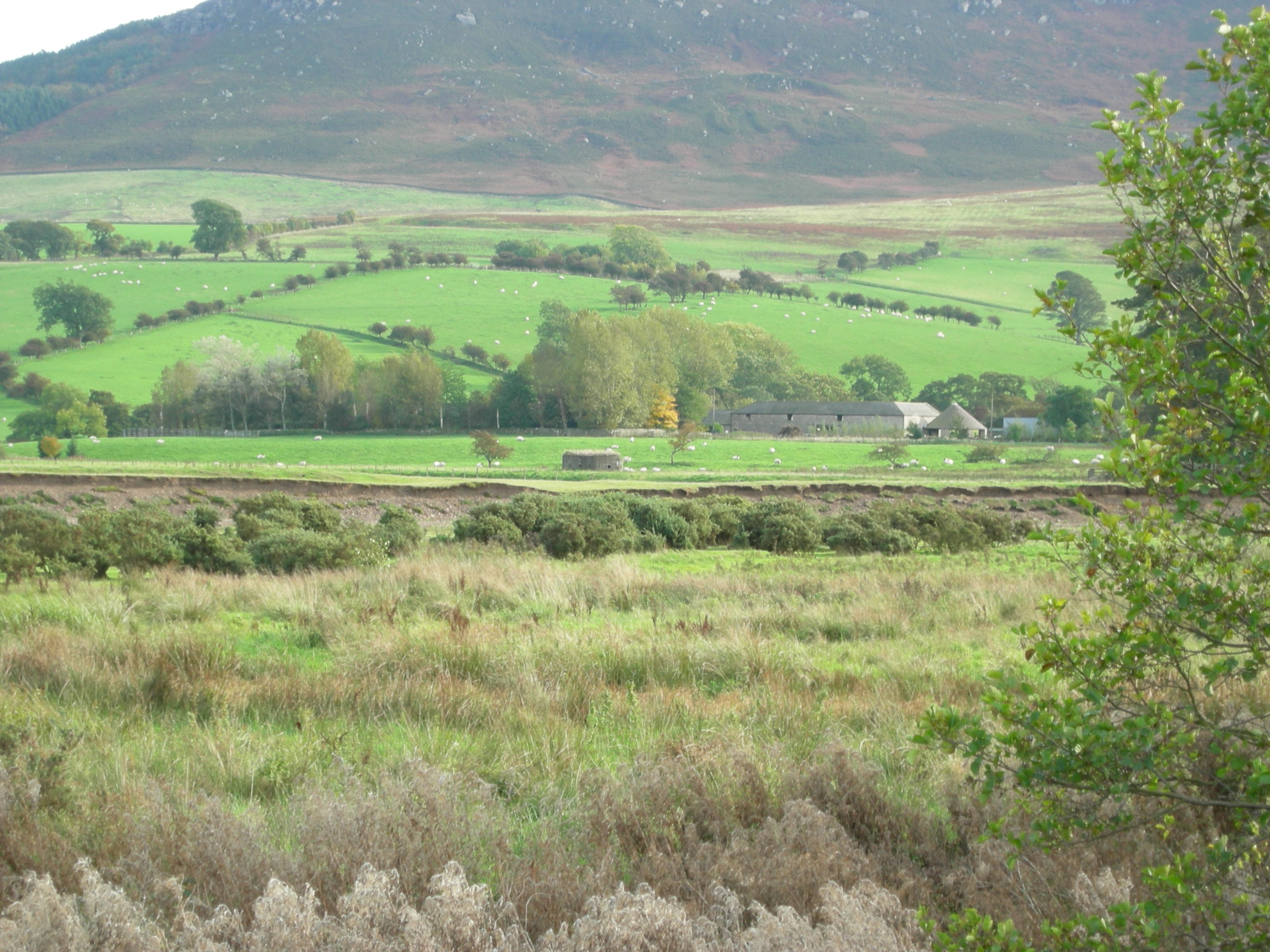
Pillbox P320 Bickerton from across the River Coquet, looking south

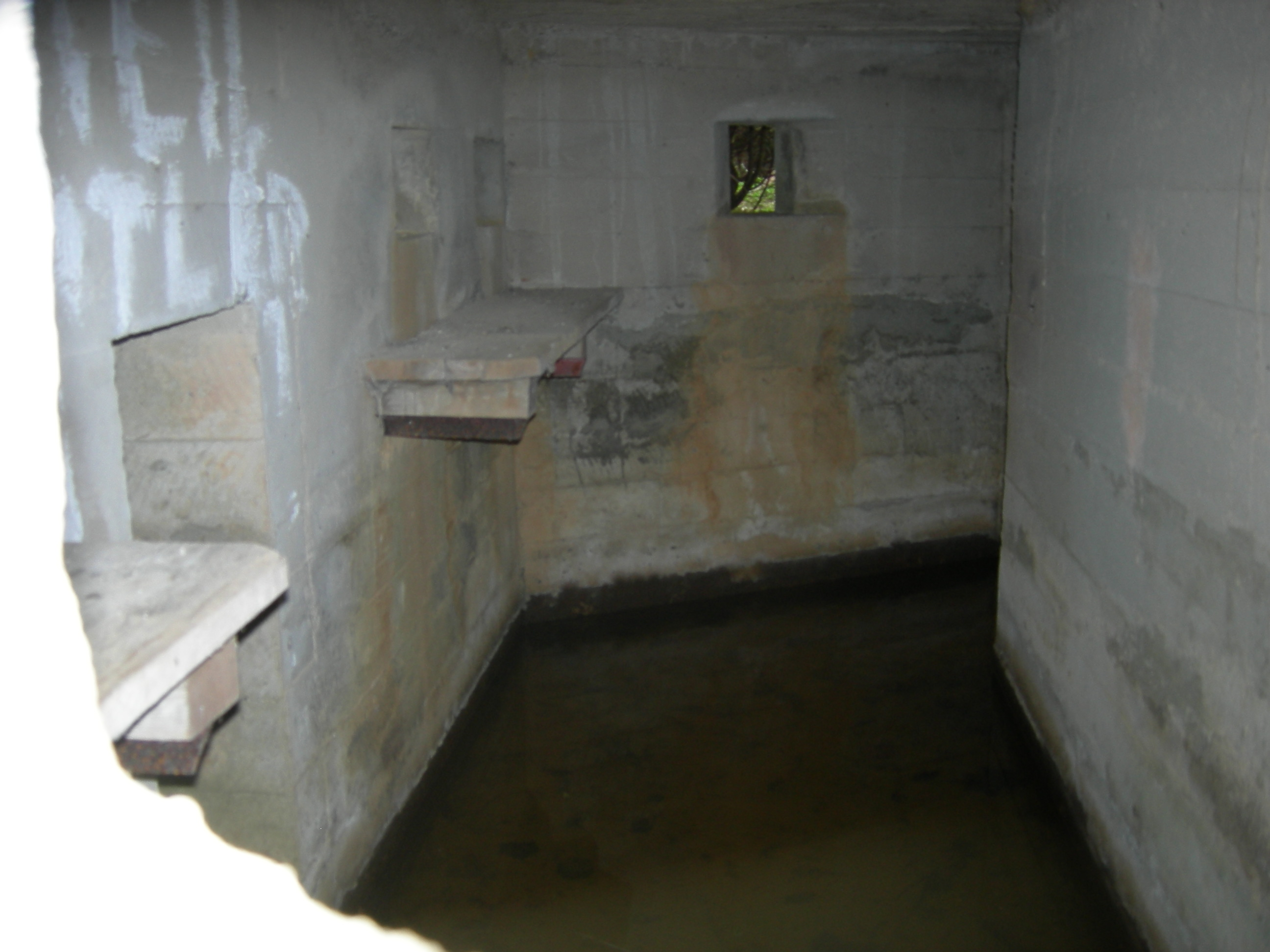
Well-preserved interior of Pillbox on the Coquet Stop Line – note graffito over the doorway, daubed in the same whitewash as the P-ID numbers: 'Heil Hitler'

The Coquet Stop Line, which ran from Amble in Northumberland up the valley of the River Coquet, formed part of the defences constructed to meet the threat of a Nazi invasion during the Second World War. It was intended to slow the advance of the German army from the north to give time for a field army to assemble on the Tyne Stop Line around 30 miles to the south.

The Coquet Stop Line was made up of a string of pillboxes, with a consistent shape that has been referred to as the "Coquet line type" or more accurately "Lozenge" type, and is only found in the North East and parts of Yorkshire. They tend to have open ground in front, often the river or its floodplain, while to the rear, where the entrance is, efforts were made to provide cover for a retreating force.

A few of these pillboxes have been lost: one on the approach to Felton village and another on the west side of the A1 at West Moor have gone. The remains of a sandbag pillbox on the north side of Amble Harbour lie opposite a large concrete block that was built for a harbour chain. There is a brick "lozenge" near the football pitch in Warkworth, though this is more likely part of the "Coastal Crust".

== Other pillboxes in the area ==
There are several other pillboxes on the Coquet, although these were probably not built as part of the Stop Line. One sandbag "beehive" type pillbox is in a garden just behind the Cross Keys public house in Thropton. It covers the west approach to the Wreigh Burn road bridge. It was built by the 250th Field Company of Royal Engineers. They built many sandbag pillboxes in the area between July and September 1940 but the concrete pillboxes were put out to local tender.

There is another pillbox near Morwick on the west side of the east coast main line. It is rectangular, half brick and half concrete, and was probably built to defend the railway viaduct or to protect the soldiers who would have been ordered to blow up the viaduct in the event of an invasion. The viaduct would have had to be kept open as long as possible to allow rolling stock to be moved.

A unique pillbox can be found by the road from Amble to Warkworth at Gloster Hill. This is a stone-fronted pillbox in the shape of an old cottage (similar to one at Hemscott Hill, Cresswell). It has a stone and concrete front and the rest is made up of sandbags.

The pillboxes at Brainshaugh and West Thirston may not be part of the Coquet Stop Line, as their identification numbers are out of sequence with the others. They may have formed an inland stop line running north to south. The pillboxes at Hazon, Brainshaugh, Morwick, West Thirston, Earsdon, Longhirst, Bothal Barns and East Moor (and possibly Eshott) form a line with the pillboxes approximately two miles apart.

There is a further modified lozenge pillbox in Rothbury. It is a standard "lozenge" except for an alteration to the porch and door, which were built on the left hand side as opposed to the rear. The pillbox is well hidden on the south side of the river. It is almost opposite the Whitton road bridge and was sited to defend the bridge. The front three embrasures are just above ground level, with left and right one having been letterboxed. The pillbox has no identification number so it may not be part of the stop line. It is at grid reference NU0560 0160.

== Locations of pillboxes ==
The following pillboxes have been firmly identified as part of the Coquet Stop Line. They are listed from east to west. The listing of a pillbox here does not imply any right to visit the sites, which are almost all on private land.

ID	Location	Grid reference	Notes
P454	West Thirston	NZ19009990	
P305	Catheugh Plantation	NZ14909950	
P306	Weldon Bridge	NZ13919833	
P307	Brinkheugh	NZ12509830	
P308	Middleheugh, Brinkburn Priory	NZ11459850	
P309	Pauperhaugh	NZ09859945	
P310	Brinkburn Station	NZ08759960	
P311	Rothbury school area		Removed
P312	Cartington near Rothbury	NU06760041	This is on Garleigh Moor, not in Cartington itself, which is near Snitter to the NW
P313	Carterside near Rothbury	NU04560100	
P314	Newtown	NU03560105	
P315	Ryehill	NU02150159	
P318	Little Tosson	NU00860140	
P319	Bickerton	NU00080066	
P320	Bickerton	NT99320042	
P321	Hepple	NY98489979	Significant subsidence due to river
P322	Hepple	NT97770002	
P323	Harehaugh	NT97249996	
P---	Brainshaugh (north of the river)	NU20400340	
P583	Morwick	NU23300330	
P---	Rothbury	NU05600160	

== See also ==
- British anti-invasion preparations of World War II
- British hardened field defences of World War II
- Taunton Stop Line
- GHQ Line
- Outer London Defence Ring
- Bridgwater and Taunton Canal
