= Outer London Defence Ring =

Early World War II fortification

Coordinates: 51.230°N 0.398°W

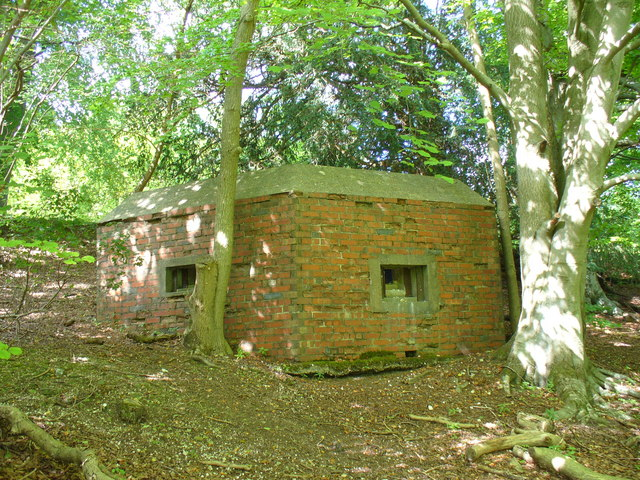
A pill box forming part of the southern section of the Outer London Defence Ring on the North Downs near Westcott, Surrey.

The Outer London Defence Ring was a defensive ring built around London during the early part of the Second World War. It was intended as a defence against a German invasion, and was part of a national network of similar "Stop Lines".

In June 1940, under the direction of General Edmund Ironside, concentric rings of anti-tank defences and pillboxes were constructed in and around London. They comprised: The London Inner Keep, London Stop Line Inner (Line C), London Stop Line Central (Line B) and London Stop Line Outer (Line A). The Outer London Ring was the strongest and best developed of these, mainly because it could be constructed in open countryside. Work on all the lines was halted weeks later by Ironside's successor, General Alan Brooke, who favoured mobile warfare above static defence.

The ring used a mixture of natural rivers and artificial ditches up to 20 feet (6 m) wide and 12 feet (4 m) deep, encircling London completely.

North of London the ring followed a path similar to the route now taken by the M25 motorway, from Watford, following the River Colne, through Potters Bar, Cuffley, Nazeing, then running south through Epping Forest, Loughton and Chigwell. Many pillboxes and anti-tank traps are still visible at points along the ring, but in the majority of places the ditch is no longer visible, covered by the M25 or London suburbs.

== Gallery ==
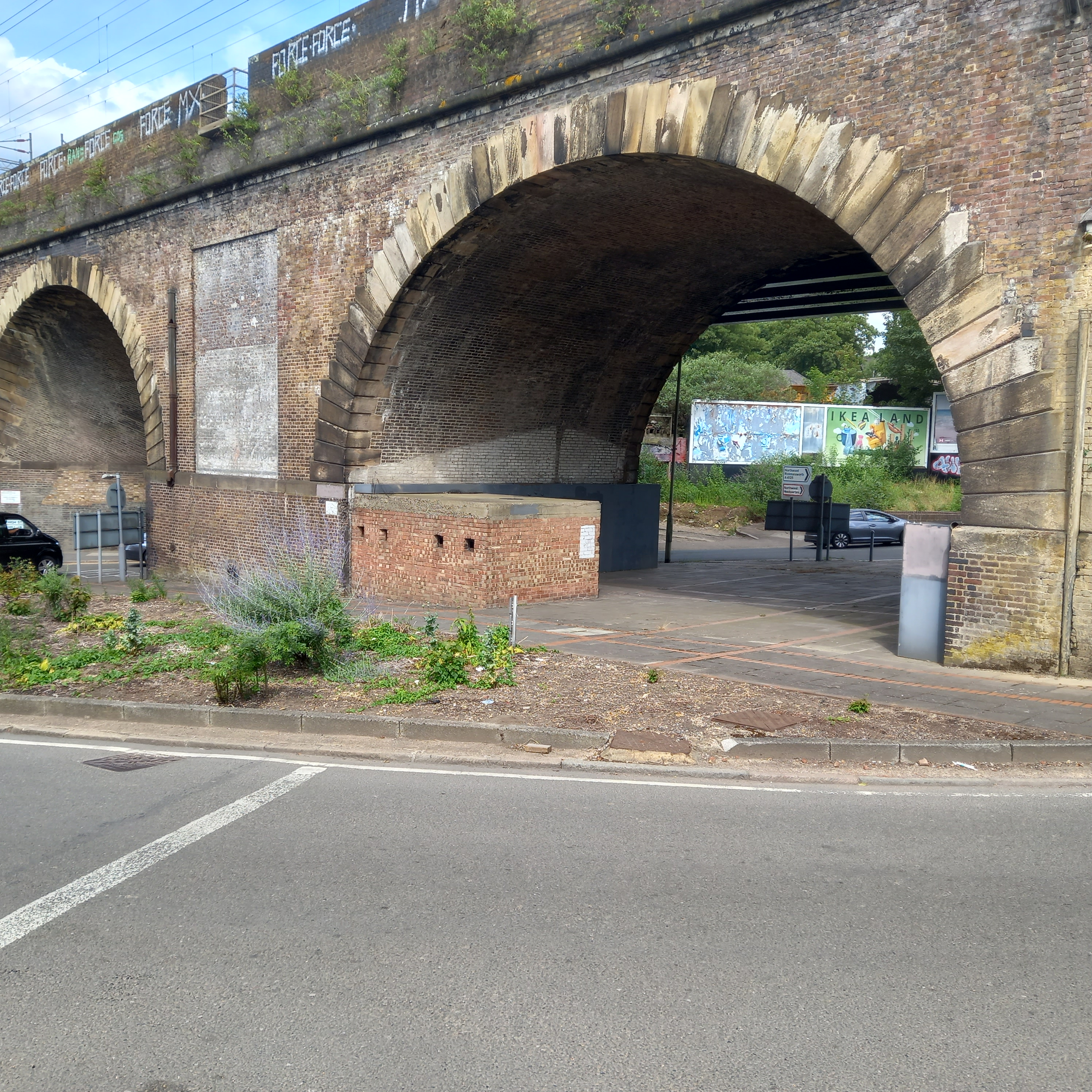
A pillbox under the Bushey Arches Railway Viaduct in Watford, overlooking the River Colne which formed part of the London Stop Line Outer.

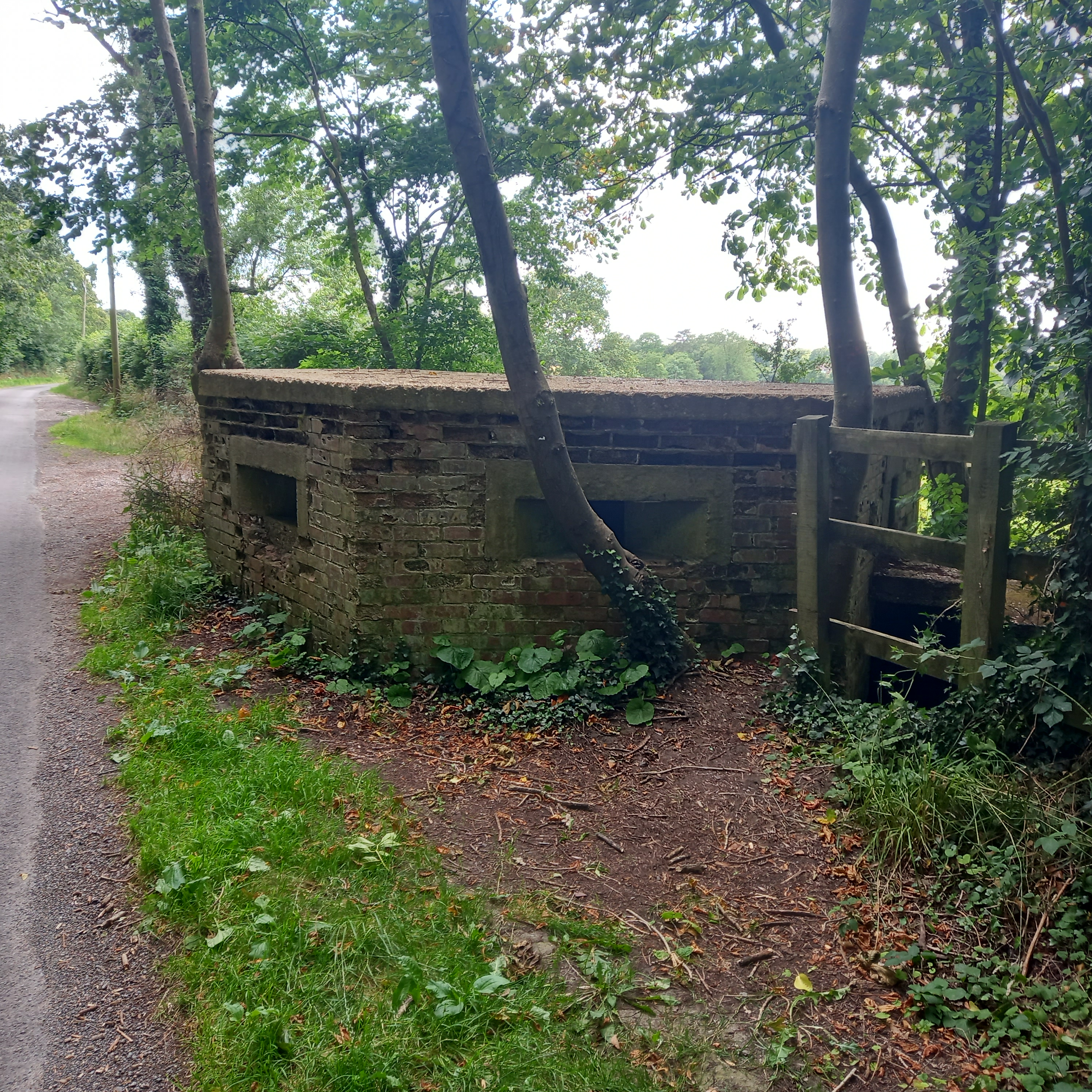
A pillbox in Shenley, Hertfordshire, close to the site of an anti-tank ditch, now filled-in.

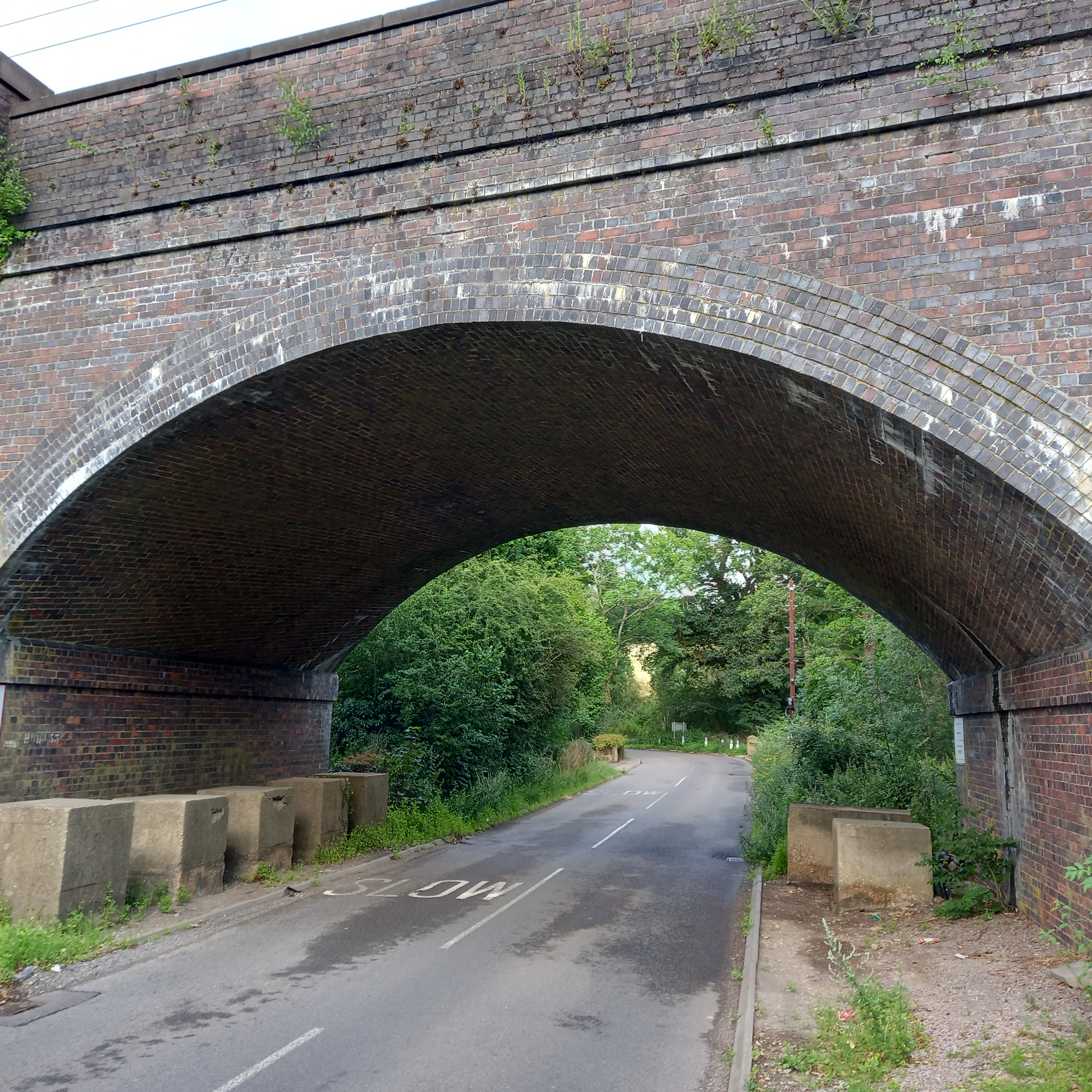
Anti-tank blocks near Newgate Street, Hertfordshire, where the defence line followed a railway embankment.

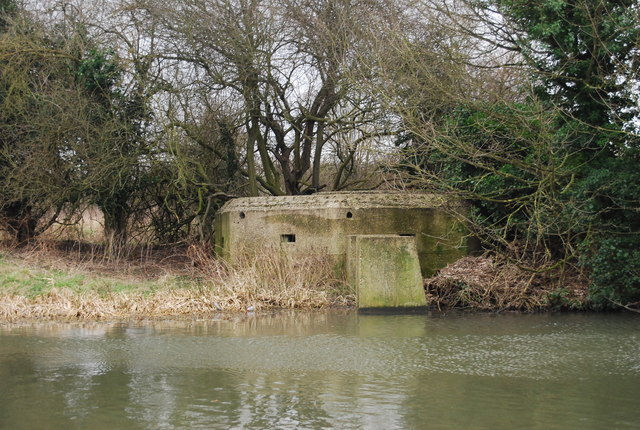
A pillbox on the Lee Navigation near Nazeing in Essex.

== See also ==
- Fortifications of London
- British anti-invasion preparations of World War II
- GHQ Line
- Taunton Stop Line
- Coquet Stop Line
- London Defence Positions - a Victorian approach to the same problem.
- Traffic and Environmental Zone, the "ring of steel" established in the City of London in the 1990s as a defence against terrorism.
