= Taunton Stop Line =

World War II defensive line in south west England

Coordinates: 51.0°N 3.0°W

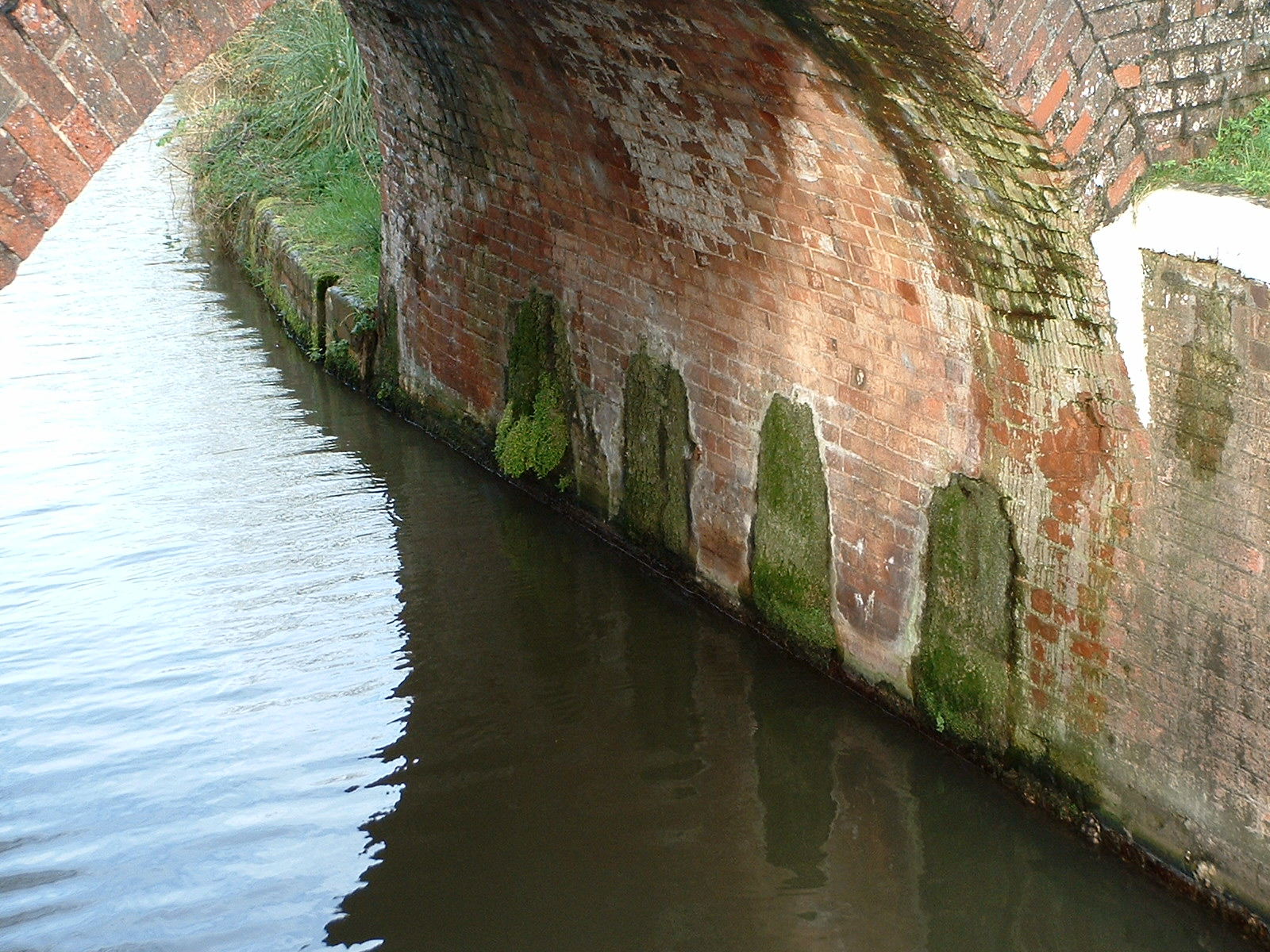
Demolition chambers under a bridge over the Bridgwater and Taunton Canal—later filled with concrete and now appearing larger than they were originally

The Taunton Stop Line was a World War II defensive line in southwest England. It was designed "to stop an enemy's advance from the west and in particular a rapid advance supported by armoured fighting vehicles (up to the size of a German medium tank) which may have broken through the forward defences."

== History ==
The Taunton Stop Line was one of more than fifty similar defensive lines that were constructed around England in WWII, all designed to compartmentalise the country to contain any breakthrough until reinforcements could arrive. Stop Lines used a combination of geography and construction to make continuous defences. The innermost and longest was the GHQ Line. They were constructed as part of a package of field fortifications planned under the leadership of General Sir Edmund Ironside, the newly appointed Commander-in-Chief, Home Forces.

The Taunton Stop Line ran north–south for nearly 50 miles (80 km) through Somerset, Dorset and Devon, from Seaton to Axminster to Chard along the River Axe, then along the Great Western Railway to Ilminster, the railway and Chard Canal to Taunton, the Bridgwater and Taunton Canal to Bridgwater, and the River Parrett to the coast near Highbridge. Highbridge was also the starting point for the east–west GHQ Line.

Aside from the obstacles created by canals, rivers and railway embankments, by early 1942 the line was defended by 309 light machine gun pillboxes (typically for the Bren gun), 61 medium machine gun emplacements (typically for the Vickers machine gun), 21 static anti-tank gun emplacements (equipped with ex-World War I naval six-pound guns), along with numerous anti-tank obstacles in the form of concrete posts, cubes and pyramids, while charge chambers were cut into bridges ready for demolition. Other armaments used included Boys Anti-tank Rifle and mobile QF 2 pounder guns.

To reinforce the line and deny access to the major east–west routes that passed through the line, in 1941 twelve "Defensive Islands" were added to the line under a plan devised by General Brooke, who succeeded Ironside. These included Bridgwater and Creech St Michael.

Two divisions from GHQ Home Forces Reserve were originally assigned to man the line, although from the autumn of 1940 the Home Guard were increasingly used.

Today, many concrete pillboxes and other fortifications remain intact, and can be seen along the length of the line.

== Gallery ==
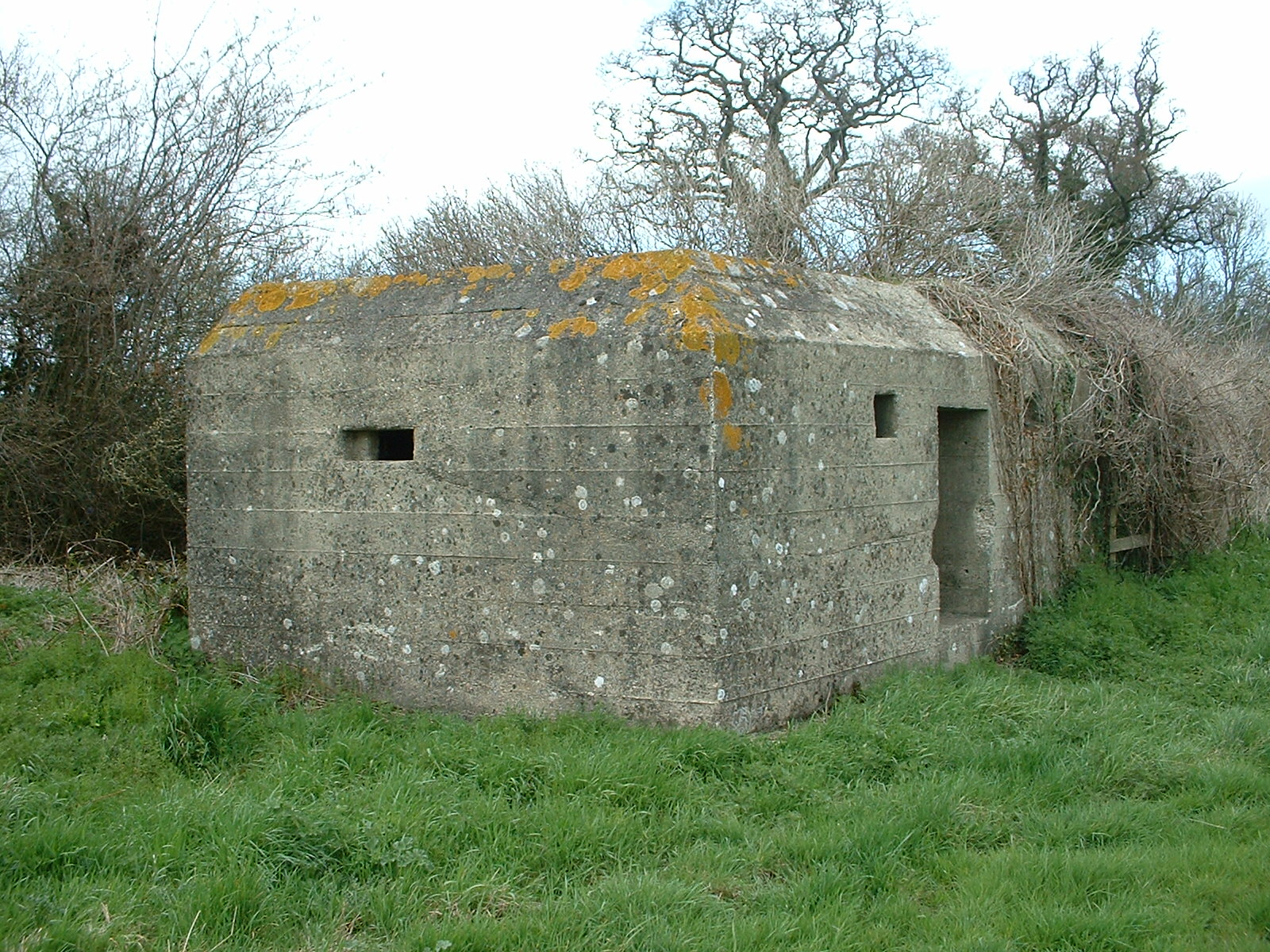
Pillbox on Taunton Stop Line.

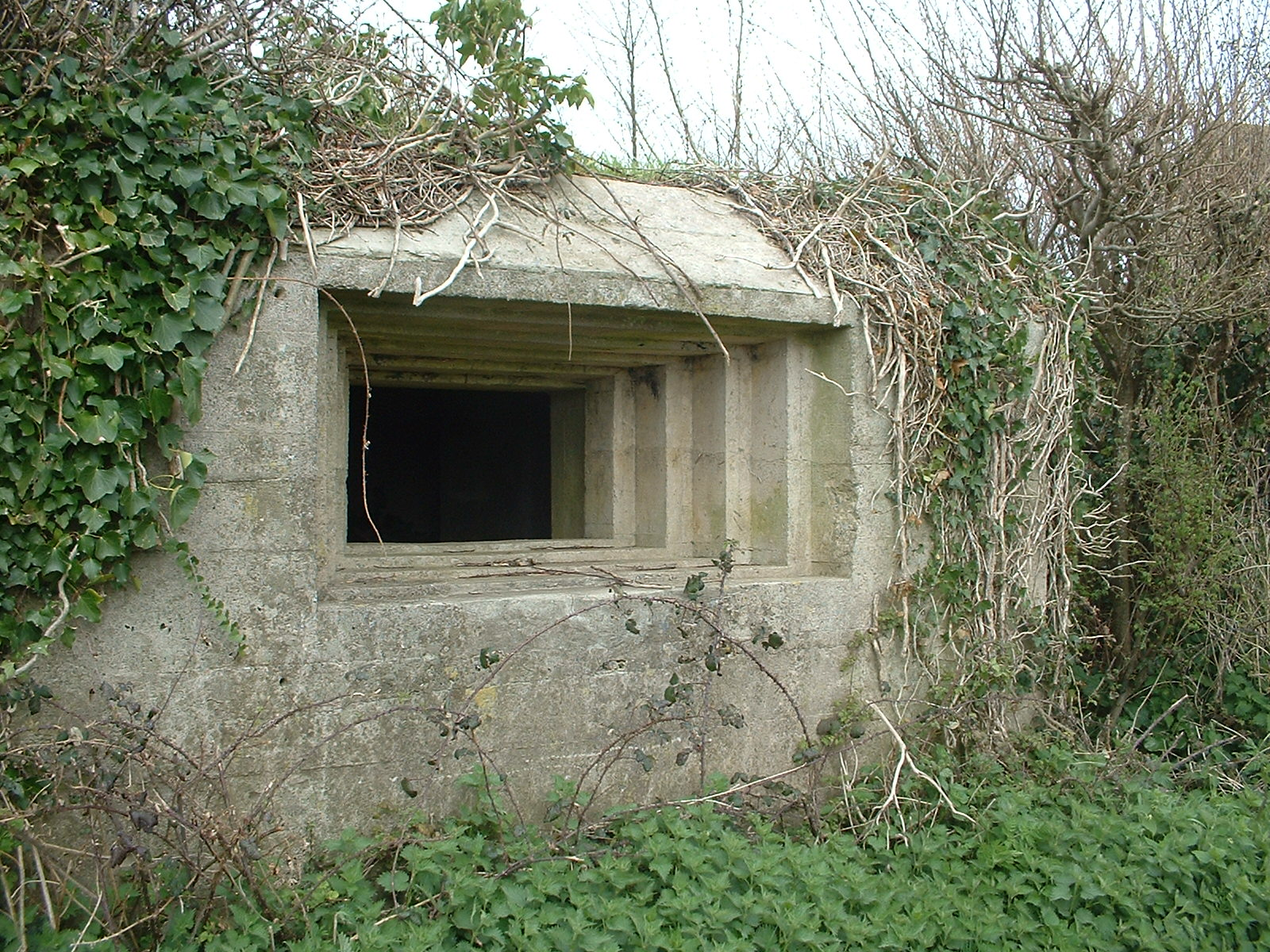
Vickers medium machine gun emplacement with large, stepped embrasure. Along the Taunton Stop Line these are typically found in pairs.

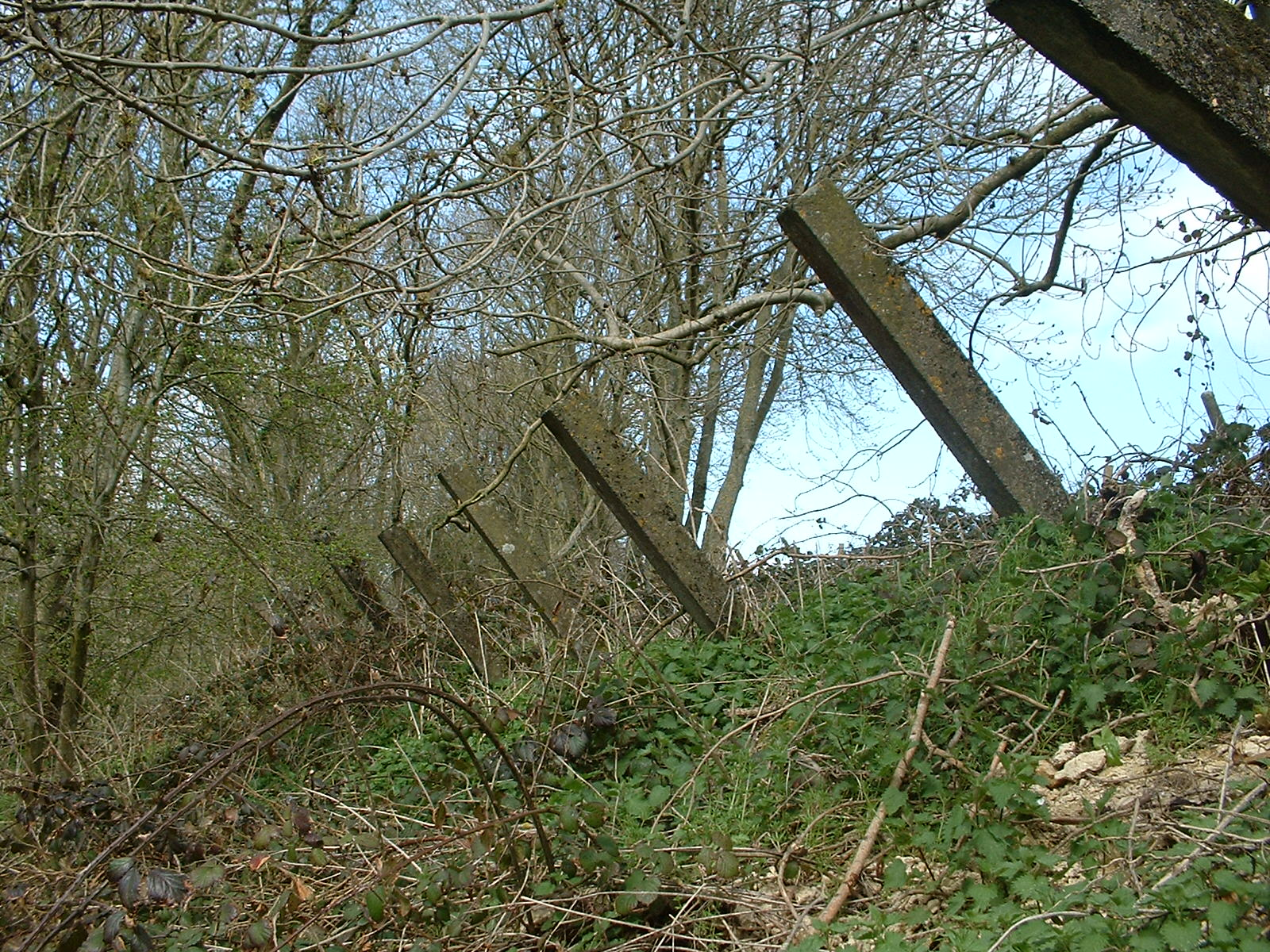
Anti-tank posts each about 8 inches (20 cm) square and projecting about 6 feet (1.8 m), made from reinforced concrete, at the top of the eastern side of a steep railway cutting. They were intended to stop enemy tanks climbing the steep side of the cutting.

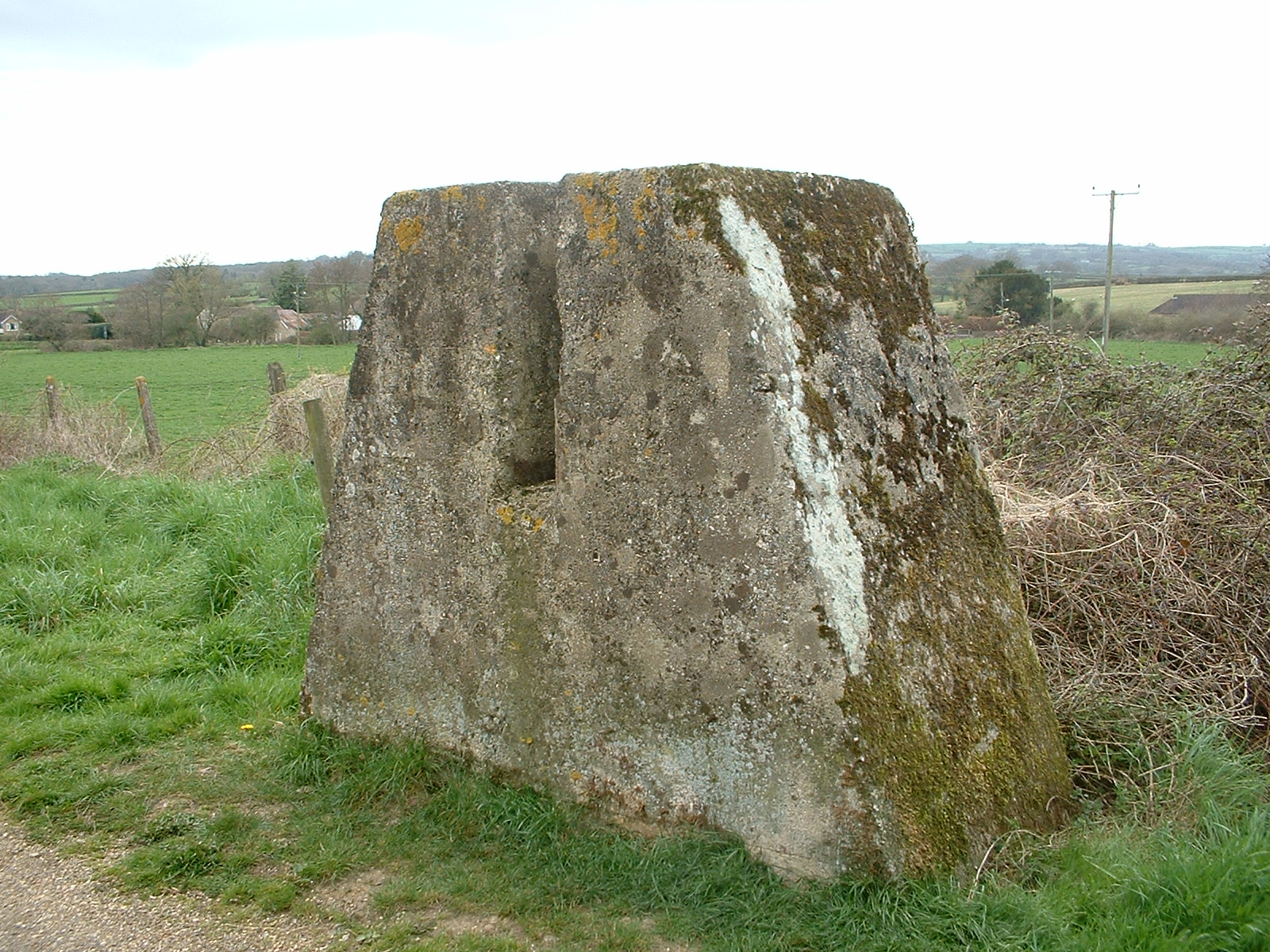
One of a pair of blocks that allowed the railway line to be blocked quickly by inserting a barrier such as a section of rail. The rail block was intended to stop enemy tracked vehicles from travelling along the railway route. The mass of concrete stands on a foundation and is about 5 feet (1.5 m) high.

== See also ==
- British anti-invasion preparations of World War II
- British hardened field defences of World War II
- GHQ Line
- Coquet Stop Line
- Outer London Defence Ring
- Bridgwater and Taunton Canal
