= Bridgwater Canalside Centre =

Coordinates: 51°06′N 2°59′W

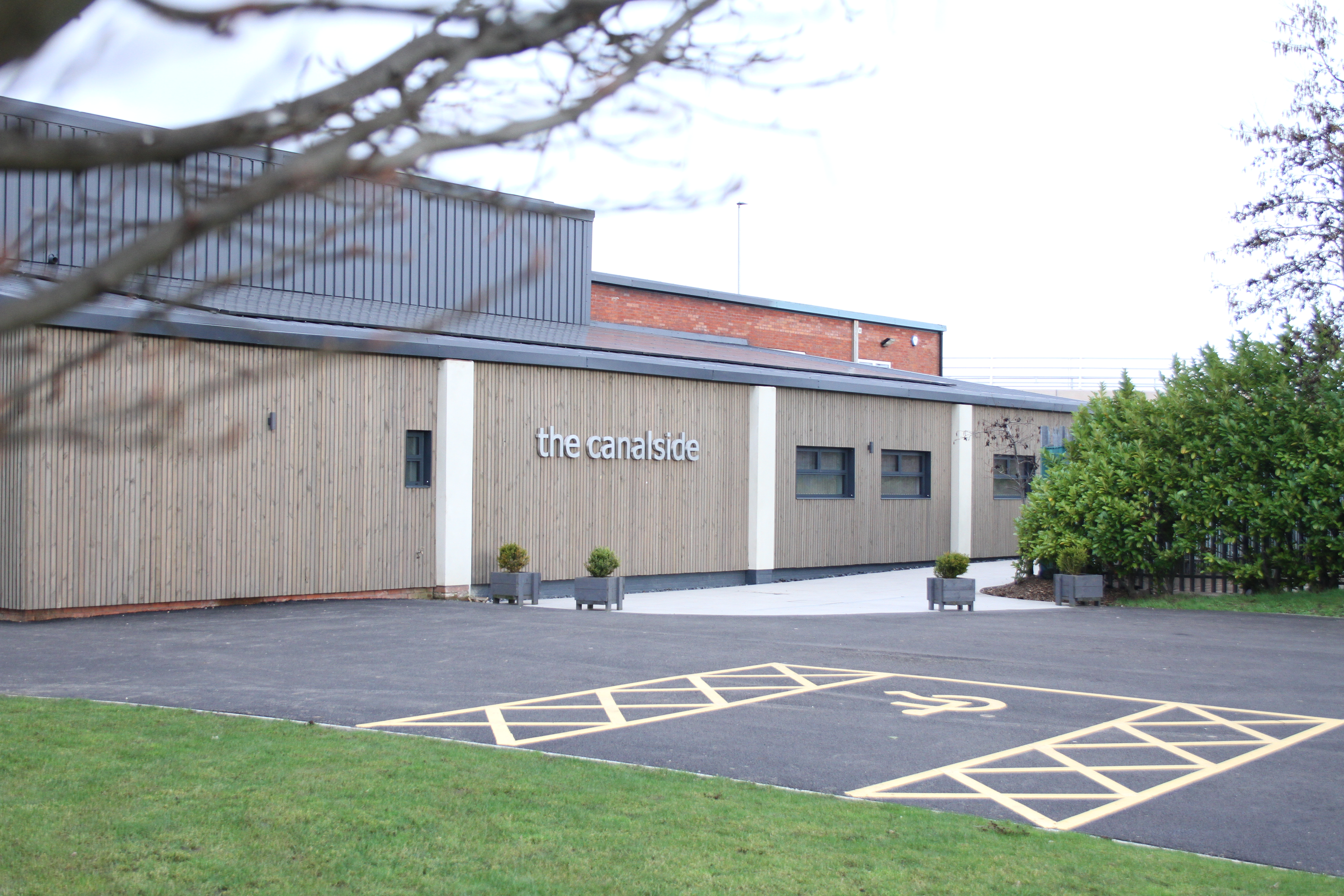
The Canalside Conference Centre

The Bridgwater Canalside Centre was renamed 'The Canalside' in February 2008 and is a facility located near to the village of Huntworth on the outskirts of Bridgwater in Somerset, England.

The site was formerly known as the Hinkley Point Sports and Social Club and was owned by British Energy until it was bought by a charity called Brunstad Christian Church - Huntworth. It is currently operated by Somerset Solutions Ltd. The property is less than a mile from Junction 24 of the M5 motorway. It is situated alongside the Bridgwater and Taunton Canal and adjacent to large areas of farmland.

The entire site is approximately 8 acres (32,000 m^{2}) and comprises 7,000 sq ft (650 m^{2}) building complex containing, large conference hall, function rooms, commercial kitchen and ancillary rooms. Outside there are 2 full-sized football pitches, flood-lit tennis courts, children's play areas and parking for around 100 cars.

It was launched in 2006 as a venue for conferences and training, functions, entertainment as well as a range of sport and community activities.

The property is used by the Somerset and Sedgemoor District Councils as well as the National Health Service. It has also been the venue of match between the world darts champions in June 2007 and a Paul Stockman event in October 2007. The Bridgwater Canalside Centre is also used as a parking site for the annual Bridgwater carnival, the profits of which are donated to charity.

In 2008, the venue was host to Our NHS Our Future — led by top surgeon Lord Ara Darzi from the Ministry of Health and the NHS Review, a week later.
