= Tyne Stop Line =

The Tyne Stop Line, which ran from the Rede Valley in Northumberland to Newcastle upon Tyne, formed part of the defences constructed to meet the threat of a Nazi invasion during World War II. Part of a network of such features, the Tyne Stop Line formed what would have been the principal defensive front for North East England against any attack coming from the north.

In the event of invasion, the intention was that the advancing German forces would have been held up at the Coquet Stop Line 30 miles to the north in Northumberland, enabling the British GHQ field army to take up positions on the Tyne. In the event of the Tyne line being overwhelmed, defending forces were to withdraw to the Derwent Stop Line, 10 miles or so to the south.

== Tyne Stop Line defensive plan ==
As soon as an invasion was confirmed, members of the 280th Field Company, Royal Engineers (based in Yorkshire), would rapidly advance north via Durham, Leadgate, Ebchester and Hexham and blow up more than 100 road, rail and foot bridges on the Tyne from the Rede Valley to Scotswood. The holes for the charges were already drilled (and the traces of many can still be seen to this day). Road approaches were to be mined and blocked by craters. The major bridges at Newcastle were to be mined but not blown up until the last minute; this was to enable any withdrawal of British forces southwards. One exception was the Swing Bridge, which was to be disabled.

Militarily Tyneside itself would be divided into eighteen districts, each with its own detailed plan of action. Beaufront Castle, between Hexham and Corbridge, was designated as the regional HQ. Industrialists met with the Regional Commissioner and the Military to arrange a scorched earth plan for Tyneside's major industries. Each was given a code word and, on receipt of their particular word, all machinery in their premises would be disabled by removing essential parts. Other signals, such as the ringing of church bells, would activate other plans: makeshift road blocks would appear all over Tyneside, in Newcastle itself at the West Road, Nuns Moor Road, Fenham Hall Drive, Shields Road, Walker Road, Heaton Road and Chillingham Road, for example; electricity would be cut by exploding charges at nodal points on the network; L.N.E.R. locomotives would disappear along country lines south of the Tyne (such as the Victoria Garesfield branch line) and then be disabled; on the Tyne and along the coast docks would be blocked and machinery disabled; fuel stores would be destroyed; the ferry landings at North and South Shields would be blown up and the ferries scuttled; and all major explosive and ammunition dumps would have their stocks either blown up or otherwise destroyed.

A network of local HQs and supply stores were set up at locations such as Manors Railway Station, the Royal Grammar School and the Newcastle Co-op premises on Newgate Street.

== See also ==
British anti-invasion preparations of World War II

Public Record Office/National Archives document PRO/WO 199/1516

Tyne & Wear Archives Service document T136-102: "Home Guard Explosive Stores"

"Twentieth Century Fortifications in England" Vols 1–3, Council for British Archaeology reports 1996
