= Huntworth =

Hamlet in Somerset, England

Coordinates: 51.105688°N 2.979790°W

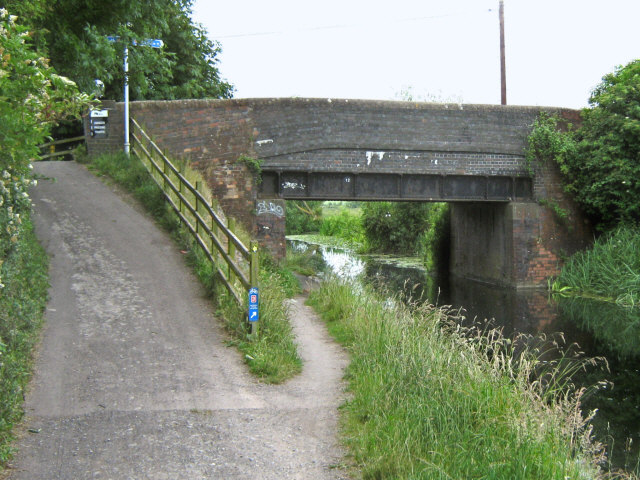
- Huntworth Bridge over the Bridgwater and Taunton Canal

- Location within Somerset
- OS grid reference: ST315345
- Civil parish: North Petherton
- Unitary authority: Somerset Council
- Ceremonial county: Somerset
- Region: South West
- Country: England
- Sovereign state: United Kingdom
- Post town: BRIDGWATER
- Postcode district: TA5, TA6, TA7
- Dialling code: 01278
- Police: Avon and Somerset
- Fire: Devon and Somerset
- Ambulance: South Western
- UK Parliament: Bridgwater

Huntworth is a small hamlet and farming community (population approximately 50), within the civil parish of North Petherton 1 mile (1.6 km) east of the M5 motorway 3 miles (4.8 km) from Bridgwater, Somerset, England.

Huntworth was in the news on 5/12/19 as it was the epicentre of a 3.2 magnitude earthquake.

== Canal ==
When the Bridgwater and Taunton Canal was opened in 1827 it joined the River Parrett by a lock at Huntworth, where a basin was constructed, but in 1841 the canal was extended to a floating harbour in Bridgwater, and the Huntworth link was filled in. The canal and river were not re-connected at this point when the canal was restored, because the Parrett is by then a salt water river laden with silt, whereas the canal contains fresh water. Not only is there a risk of silt entering the canal, but the salt water cannot be allowed to contaminate the fresh, as the canal is still used for the transport of drinking water for Bridgwater's population.

== Beam Wireless Station ==
The Imperial Wireless Chain, also known as the Empire Wireless Chain, was a strategic international wireless telegraphy communications network, created to link the countries of the British Empire.

Between 1929 and 1940 Huntworth was the site of the "Bridgwater" Beam Wireless Station, which received HF communications from Drummondville and Yamachiche in Canada, and Kliphevel (now Klipheuwel) and Milnerton in South Africa, working with an associated transmitter station at Bodmin.

Each aerial for the Beam Wireless Station stretched to nearly half a mile (0.78 km) long, and consisted of a row of five 277 feet (84 m) high lattice masts, erected in a line at 640-foot (200 m) intervals and at right angles to the overseas receiving station. These were topped by a cross-arm measuring 10 feet high by 90 feet wide (3m x 27.4m), from which the vertical wires of the aerial were hung, forming a 'curtain antenna'.

Although the site has long since closed, and all the equipment has been removed, the facility is remembered in the naming of 5 properties in the village as Beam Wireless Station.

== Manor ==
The manor of Huntworth was acquired in the late 13th century by the de Popham family of Popham, Hampshire, which senior family died out in the male line on the death of Sir Stephen Popham (c. 1386 – 1444), five times MP for Hampshire. The Popham family of Huntworth was more prominent and longer-lived than the Pophams of Popham. The most prominent member of the Huntworth line was Sir John Popham (1531–1607), Lord Chief Justice of England from 1592 until his death. His monument survives in the nearby Church of St John the Baptist in Wellington.

== Present Day ==
The Bridgwater Canalside Centre provides an entertainment and meeting venue.

== Geography ==
Screech Owl is the name of an 11.7 hectares (29 acres) local nature reserve. It is a wetland area which supports a variety of birds, bats and small mammals.
