= Conservators =

In certain areas of England, conservators are statutory bodies which manage areas of countryside for the use of the public.

== Establishment, role and powers ==
Conservators are bodies corporate generally established, and granted their powers, by a scheme made under the Commons Act 1876 (39 & 40 Vict. c. 56) or by a local act of Parliament.

The exact role and powers of each group of conservators are defined by their establishing act and vary, but in general terms their role is to:

- regulate and manage their area for public recreation,
- protect the rights of commoners (if applicable) and
- conserve the natural beauty of their area.

Conservators often have the power to manage the land, and the trees, plants and animals on it, to provide recreation facilities, to control activity within their area, regulate navigation on waterways and to make byelaws.

== Membership ==
Membership of boards of conservators varies according to the terms of the individual legislation that established them. Examples of types of member include those:

- elected by commoners or local residents
- appointed by local councils
- appointed by universities
- appointed by a lord of the manor

== Future ==
The Commons Act 2006 provided for the establishment of commons councils to manage common land. Those provisions of the act are not yet in force, but the Department of the Environment, Food and Rural Affairs (DEFRA) plans to bring them into force in the spring of 2009. The commons councils established under the act will have a similar role to that of existing conservators. According to DEFRA's website, commons councils will only be established where there is a local wish and will not be imposed. Where a commons council is established, the act provides powers for DEFRA to alter or remove existing management arrangements (which could include Conservators) where they might conflict with the functions granted to a new commons council.

== Examples of conservators ==
- Conservators of Ashdown Forest
- Malvern Hills Conservators
- Conservators of the River Cam
- Banstead Commons Conservators
- Wimbledon and Putney Commons Conservators
- Tumbridge Wells Commons Conservators
- Mitcham Common Conservators
- Shenfield Common Conservators
- Epsom and Walton Downs Conservators
- Mousehold Heath Conservators
- Conservators of Therfield Heath and Greens
- Oxshott Heath Conservators
- Chislehurst and St Paul's Cray Commons Conservators
- The Common Council of the City of London is the Conservator of Epping Forest
- Cleeve Common Board of Conservators

== Similar bodies ==
- Dartmoor Commoners' Council
- Greenham and Crookham Commons Commissioners
