= Bridgwater and Taunton Canal =

Canal in south-west England

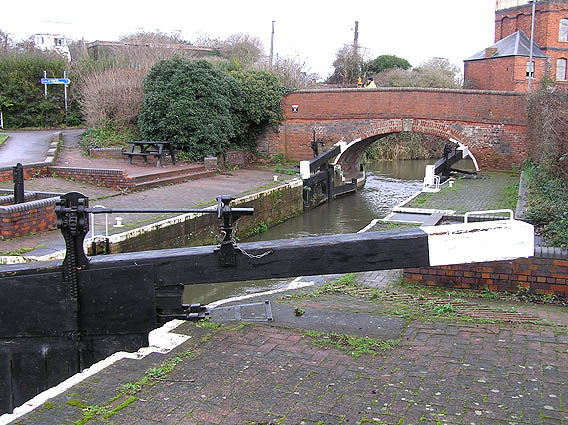
- Firepool Lock, where the canal joins the River Tone
- Interactive map of Bridgwater and Taunton Canal

Specifications
- Length: 14.5 miles (23.3 km)
- Maximum boat length: 51 ft 10 in (15.80 m)
- Maximum boat beam: 13 ft 7 in (4.14 m)
- Locks: 7 (originally 6)
- Status: Navigable
- Navigation authority: Canal and River Trust

History
- Original owner: Bridgwater and Taunton Canal Company
- Principal engineer: James Hollinsworth
- Date of act: 1811, 1824
- Date of first use: 1827
- Date completed: 1841
- Date closed: 1907
- Date restored: 1994

Geography
- Start point: Taunton
- End point: Bridgwater Docks
- Connects to: isolated

The Bridgwater and Taunton Canal is a canal in the south-west of England between Bridgwater and Taunton, opened in 1827 and linking the River Tone to the River Parrett. There were a number of abortive schemes to link the Bristol Channel to the English Channel by waterway in the 18th and early 19th centuries. These schemes followed the approximate route eventually taken by the Bridgwater and Taunton Canal, but the canal was instead built as part of a plan to link Bristol to Taunton by waterway.

The early years of operation were marred by a series of legal disputes, which were resolved when the Bridgwater and Taunton Canal Company and the Conservators, who managed the River Tone Navigation, agreed that the canal company should take over the Tone Navigation. The canal originally terminated at a basin at Huntworth, to the east of Bridgwater, but was later extended to a floating harbour at Bridgwater Docks on its western edge. Financially this was a disaster, as the extension was funded by a mortgage, and the arrival of the railways soon afterwards started the demise of the canal. The canal was rescued from bankruptcy by the Bristol and Exeter Railway in 1866.

Despite commercial traffic ceasing in 1907, the infrastructure was maintained in good order, and the canal was used for the transport of potable water from 1962. The Countryside Act 1968 provided a framework for Somerset County Council to start the restoration of the canal as a leisure facility, which was completed in 1994, when the canal was reopened throughout. Bridgwater Docks have been restored as a marina, but there is no navigable connection to the River Parrett, as the canal still transports drinking water for the people of Bridgwater.

== History ==
Prior to the building of the canal, navigation between the towns of Bridgwater and Taunton was possible by using the River Parrett and the River Tone. The Tone had been improved by its conservators, who had obtained acts of Parliament; the River Tone Navigation Act 1698 (10 Will. 3. c. 8) in 1699 and the River Tone Improvement Act 1707 (6 Ann. c. 70) in 1707; which had allowed them to straighten and dredge the river and parts of the Parrett, and to build locks and half-locks to manage the water levels. The initial work was completed by 1717, although further improvements including more locks continued to be made until the early 19th century.

=== Precursors ===
From 1768 there were a number of grand schemes proposed, all with the aim of linking the Bristol Channel to the English Channel by a waterway, thereby avoiding the need to navigate by sea around Cornwall and Devon. James Brindley was the first to survey a route, which would have run from the Bristol Channel to Exeter, following the course of the River Tone for part of its route. In 1769, Robert Whitworth looked at a shorter route from Bridgwater Bay to Seaton, following the River Parrett and the River Axe. He was asked to reassess the route in the 1790s. William Jessop surveyed a route between Taunton and Exeter in 1794, while another group proposed a canal linking Bristol, Nailsea, Bridgwater and Taunton, which was surveyed by William White. Jessop's assistant, Josiah Easton, suggested a route from Uphill (on the Bristol Channel) to Seaton, again in 1794, and the previous two schemes sought parliamentary approval as the Grand Western Canal and the Bristol and Western Canal, respectively. Only the first was authorised, as the Grand Western Canal Act 1796 (36 Geo. 3. c. 46), but the economic downturn caused by the Napoleonic Wars meant that construction did not begin immediately.

Bristol and Taunton Canal Navigation Act 1811
- Act of Parliament
- Parliament of the United Kingdom
- Long title: An Act for making a Navigable Canal from the River Avon, at or near Morgan's Pill, in the Parish of Easton in Gordano otherwise Saint George's, in the County of Somerset, to or near the River Tone, in the Parish of Saint James in Taunton, in the said County, and a certain navigable Cut therein described.
- Citation: 51 Geo. 3. c. lx

Dates
- Royal assent: 14 May 1811

Text of statute as originally enacted

Bristol and Taunton Canal Navigation Act 1824
- Act of Parliament
- Parliament of the United Kingdom
- Long title: An Act to abridge, vary, extend and improve the Bristol and Taunton Canal Navigation; and to alter the Powers of an Act of the Fifty first Year of His late Majesty, for making the said Canal.
- Citation: 5 Geo. 4. c. cxx

Dates
- Royal assent: 17 June 1824

John Rennie surveyed the line for a ship canal from the mouth of the River Parrett to Seaton in 1810, which was designed for ships of 120 long tons (120 t), but it was felt that the economic situation would not support the projected expenditure of over £1 million. He then considered a more modest proposal, based on the original Bristol and Western plans, and the scheme, now renamed the Bristol and Taunton Canal, was authorised by an act of Parliament, the Bristol and Taunton Canal Navigation Act 1811 (51 Geo. 3. c. lx) dated 14 May 1811. The company had powers to raise £420,000 in shares and an additional £150,000 if required, but economic concerns meant that the project did not start immediately. Powers for the Bristol to Bridgwater section lapsed in 1815, but work finally commenced in 1822, to be halted by an injunction because the authorised route was not being followed. A further act, the Bristol and Taunton Canal Navigation Act 1824 (5 Geo. 4. c. cxx) of 17 June 1824, authorised the revised route, and changed the name of the project to the Bridgwater and Taunton Canal Company. The predicted costs for the construction of the shorter canal were £34,145, as opposed to £429,990 for the longer scheme.

Three further schemes were proposed before the idea of a Channel-to-Channel link was abandoned. James Green proposed a tub-boat canal in 1822, capable of handling 5-long-ton (5.1 t) boats, which would have used inclines instead of locks, and would have cost £120,000. Thomas Telford revived the idea of a ship canal in 1824, which would have taken over the line of the Bridgwater and Taunton Canal – enabling 200-long-ton (200 t) boats to reach the south coast – at a cost of £1.75 million. This was authorised in 1825, but no further action occurred. Finally, a barge canal between Bridgwater and Beer, costing £600,000, was proposed in 1828, but enthusiasm for large canal schemes was waning, and the advent of iron-hulled steamships meant that the risks of navigation around the south-west peninsula were reduced.

=== Construction ===
Construction of the canal began in 1822, with James Hollinsworth as the engineer and John Easton as the senior surveyor. The Bristol and Taunton scheme had incorporated a high-level crossing of the River Parrett, but the shortened canal would now join the Parrett at Huntworth, where a basin was to be constructed. This change of route resulted in the Reverend Robert Gray obtaining an injunction, and work on the lower half of the canal stopped until the new route could be properly authorised by the Bristol and Taunton Canal Navigation Act 1824. By this time, the estimated cost had risen to £60,000. Below Durston, the canal was cut into the clay subsoil, the clay forming a naturally waterproof channel; but from Durston to Taunton the canal bed had to be puddled with clay to make it watertight, as the underlying ground was shale.

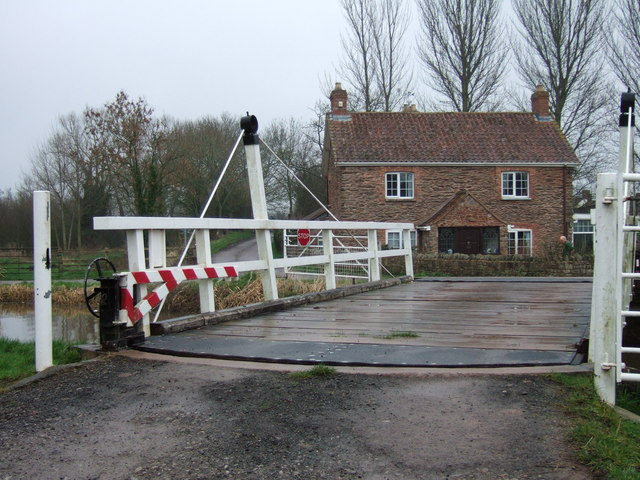
Fordgate swing bridge, rebuilt in December 1987, and the third fixed bridge to be reinstated

The canal was to be about 12 miles (19 km) long. It included a 700-yard (640 m) embankment at Lyng, which was 40 feet (12 m) high, two short cuttings, eleven brick-built bridges to carry roads over the canal, and more than twelve timber swing bridges, built to provide accommodation crossings for farms which had been divided by the line of the canal. The lock at Firepool (Taunton) had a set of reverse-facing gates, to prevent the canal draining if the level of the River Tone dropped. There were four more locks on the main line, and a lock at the entrance to Huntworth Basin. One final lock connected the basin to the river, and again it had a set of reverse-facing gates, so that the basin could be drained at low tide, and the low level retained for maintenance if required. A system of paddle gearing – using metal ball weights at the top and metal cylinder weights at the bottom – is unique to the Bridgwater and Taunton Canal. Over fifty culverts were built to carry streams and drainage ditches under the canal. The work was completed with no recorded incidents of serious injury or death among the workforce.

By mid-1826, the canal company had insufficient funds to complete the work, and a special meeting authorised the taking out of a mortgage to cover the £15,000 deficit. The canal was an obvious competitor to the River Tone Navigation, which was managed by the Conservators of the River Tone, a legal body created for that purpose by in 1699 by the River Tone Navigation Act 1698 (10 Will. 3. c. 8). There was animosity between the company and the conservators, with the company maintaining that they had a right to use the Tone to reach the centre of Taunton, and the conservators maintaining that they did not. The canal was scheduled to be opened on 1 January 1827, but the opening was delayed until 3 January, as the connection to the River Tone was not made until 2 January. The opening celebrations were hampered by snow and bitter cold weather.

=== Operation ===
Bridgwater and Taunton Canal Navigation Act 1832
- Act of Parliament
- Parliament of the United Kingdom
- Long title: An Act to explain and amend Two Acts, of the Fifty-first Year of His late Majesty King George the Third and the Fifth Year of His late Majesty King George the Fourth, relative to the Bridgewater and Taunton Canal Navigation.
- Citation: 2 & 3 Will. 4. c. xliii

Dates
- Royal assent: 23 May 1832

Other legislation
- Relates to: Bristol and Taunton Canal Navigation Act 1811; Bristol and Taunton Canal Navigation Act 1824

Text of statute as originally enacted

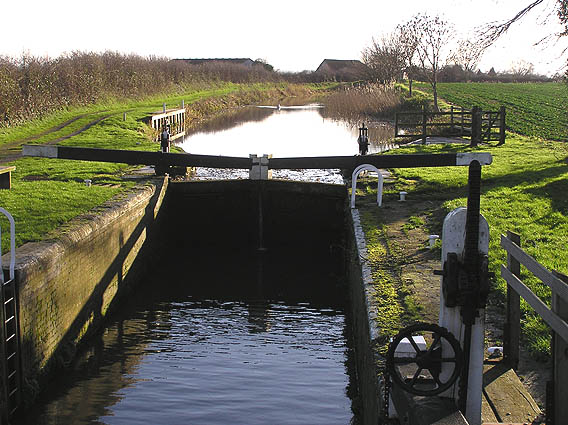
Standard's Lock

The early years of the new canal were marred by legal disputes with the Conservators of the River Tone. The connection to the Tone at Taunton had been made forcibly, by the canal company breaching the bank of the river. In August 1827 they announced that they were taking over the Tone, and evicted William Goodland, the river superintendent, from his cottage. Despite a ruling by the Court of King's Bench that their action was illegal, the canal company held on to the river until a High Court judgment in February 1830. The conservators promptly built a dam, to prevent boats reaching the river and water entering the canal, which they removed after further legal action and an order of the Chancery Court. Reconciliation finally came in late 1831, when the two parties proposed a new act of Parliament to authorise the sale of the Tone Navigation to the canal company. The Bridgwater and Taunton Canal Navigation Act 1832 (2 & 3 Will. 4. c. xliii) was obtained in July 1832, and required the canal company to erect a new iron bridge to replace the existing North Town Bridge, which hampered access to the wharfs in Taunton. They also had powers to construct a lock and a short length of canal at French Weir, to connect with the Grand Western Canal, while the conservators were allowed to conduct an annual inspection of the canal, and to resume their ownership of the river if the canal was not maintained in good order.

Bridgwater and Taunton Canal Navigation Act 1837
- Act of Parliament
- Parliament of the United Kingdom
- Long title: An Act to enable the Company of Proprietors of the Bridgewater and Taunton Canal Navigation to continue the Line of the Canal below the Town of Bridgewater, and for varying the Powers of the several Acts relative to the said Canal.
- Citation: 7 Will. 4 & 1 Vict. c. xi

Dates
- Royal assent: 21 April 1837

Text of statute as originally enacted

At the Bridgwater end, navigation onto the River Parrett was not easy, and the Corporation of Bridgwater had commissioned a number of surveys to construct a floating harbour. All came to nothing, but in 1836 the Bristol and Exeter Railway Company obtained an act of Parliament, the Bristol and Exeter Railway Act 1836 (6 & 7 Will. 4. c. xxxvi), to construct a railway which would pass through Bridgwater. Subsequently, the canal company, in order to protect their trade, sought their own act of Parliament to construct a floating harbour to the west of Bridgwater, and to extend the canal to join it. The Bridgwater and Taunton Canal Navigation Act 1837 (7 Will. 4 & 1 Vict. c. xi) was obtained on 21 April 1837, and the works were started. The construction work involved a deep cutting from Albert Street to West Street, a short tunnel at West Street. There it entered Bridgwater Docks, which consisted of:

- Inner basin that covered 4 acres (1.6 ha)
- Outer basin covering 0.5 acres (0.20 ha)

The two basins were connected by a lock, whilst towards the river a ship lock consisting of a single 40-foot (12 m) gate, and a barge lock, consisting of a pair of 14-foot (4.3 m) gates. The whole outer basin could be used as a lock by larger ships up to 600 tons. The estimated cost of £25,000 for the scheme escalated to nearly £100,000, most of which was raised by mortgage.

Bridgwater and Taunton Canal and Stolford Railway and Harbour Act 1846
- Act of Parliament
- Parliament of the United Kingdom
- Long title: An Act to enable the Bridgewater and Taunton Canal Company to make a Railway from Bridgewater to the Bristol Channel at or near Stolford in the County of Somerset, with Branches therefrom, and to make a Harbour at or near Stolford.
- Citation: 9 & 10 Vict. c. cxlv

Dates
- Royal assent: 3 July 1846

The new facilities were opened on 25 March 1841, after which the basin and locks at Huntworth were filled in. Trade increased from 90,000 long tons (91,000 t) in 1840, before the harbour opened, to 120,000 long tons (120,000 t) shortly afterwards. Around 2,400 vessels per year were using the port by 1853. The canal company had hoped that the opening of the Grand Western Canal in 1838 and the Chard Canal in 1842 would increase traffic significantly, but their impact was marginal. Despite commercial success, the interest payments on the mortgage were crippling, and in 1846 the company obtained an act of Parliament, the Bridgwater and Taunton Canal and Stolford Railway and Harbour Act 1846 (9 & 10 Vict. c. cxlv), to convert the canal into a railway, although its powers were never used. Trade halved as railway competition increased, and the company was in the hands of receivers by the early 1850s.

Bridgwater and Taunton Canal Act 1866
- Act of Parliament
- Parliament of the United Kingdom
- Long title: An Act to authorize the Transfer to the Bristol and Exeter Railway Company of the Undertaking of the Bridgewater and Taunton Canal and Stolford Railway and Harbour Company; and for other Purposes.
- Citation: 29 & 30 Vict. c. xcvi

Dates
- Royal assent: 28 June 1866

In 1866 the Bristol and Exeter Railway stepped in and bought the canal. The main attraction was the dock, with its large volume of coal traffic, but they purchased both the canal and the dock for £64,000, under the terms of the Bridgwater and Taunton Canal Act 1866 (29 & 30 Vict. c. xcvi), which included a requirement that there should always be "a good and sufficient water communication between the towns of Taunton and Bridgwater". Unlike many such acquisitions, the canal was seen as a useful adjunct to the railway network, and was maintained in good order for several years, with the Conservators of the River Tone continuing their annual inspections, and reporting any defects to the railway company.

=== Decline ===
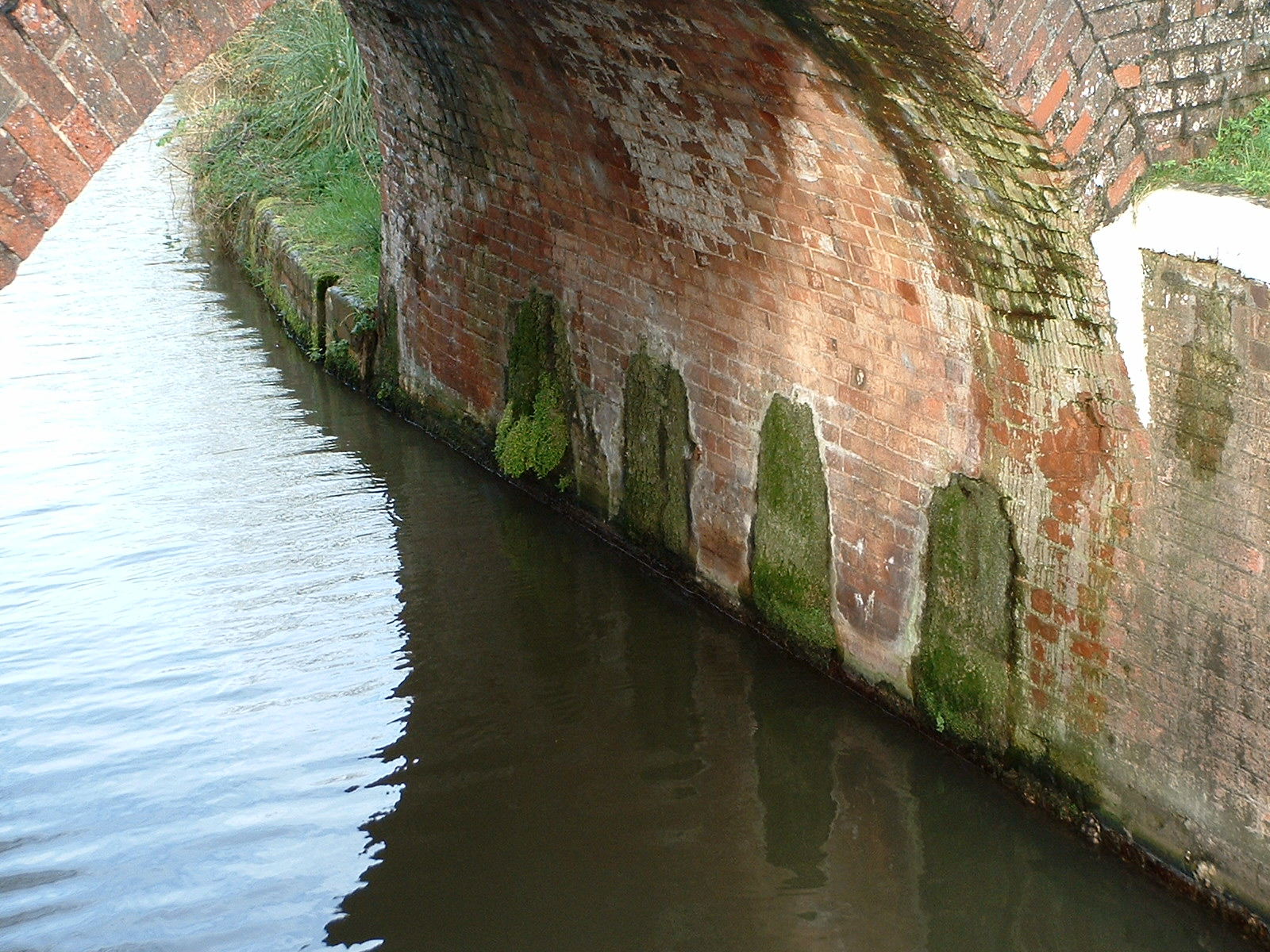
Demolition chambers under a bridge over the Bridgwater and Taunton Canal – they were later filled with concrete and now appear larger than they originally were.

The canal was increasingly affected by water supply problems. The main source of water was the River Tone, although this was not fed into the canal at Firepool, in order to ensure that the mills on the upper section could function. Instead water was pumped out of the river at Creech, by the Charlton Pumping Station, where the river and canal were only 300 yards (270 m) apart. Large volumes of water were discharged from the canal every fortnight, when the Bridgwater Dock was scoured, in order to free it from silt, while the Railway Company was extracting water to supply the station and steam locomotive sheds at Taunton. During the summer months there was often not enough water to go round.

The canal gradually became clogged with weed, and the railway took much of the trade. Between 1870 and 1874, income dropped from £2,500 to £1,700. Three years later, the Bristol and Exeter Railway merged with the Great Western Railway. The new owners were remote, and were more interested in the water supply for Taunton station and for the Bridgwater Dock, than running the canal as a going concern, with the result that the canal deteriorated further. The Conservators continued their annual inspections, but had little hope of any improvements being made.

The opening by the Great Western Railway of the Severn Tunnel in 1886 brought further decline, for the imports of coal and slate from South Wales to Bridgwater Dock and the canal could now be moved more directly. The provision in 1902 of water troughs on the railway near Creech, to enable non-stop trains to pick up water, required another 100,000 imperial gallons (450 m^{3}) a day, which was extracted from the Tone. The remaining traffic moved to the railway, the last commercial boats used the canal, from Bridgwater dock to a wharf in North Town, Taunton, in 1907, and the canal was effectively closed.

=== Closure ===
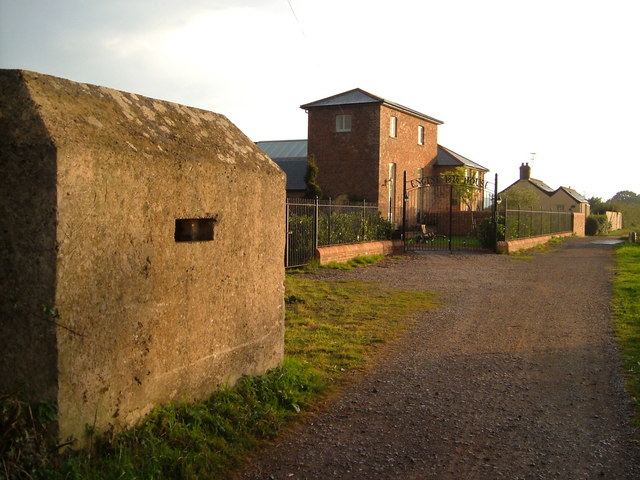
A pillbox which formed part of the Taunton Stop Line, with Creech engine house, Charlton, in the background

After the First World War the canal remained in a state of limbo – with minimal maintenance by the railway company – and was the haunt of fishermen and walkers. The Conservators continued their annual inspections, and the infrastructure remained in remarkably good order, compared to many other closed canals. The section near Creech St Michael was even used for swimming lessons for the local school children in the 1930s.

During the Second World War the route of the canal was employed as part of the Taunton Stop Line, a defensive line which followed the course of canals and railway embankments from the mouth of the Parrett to Seaton on the south coast. All permanent bridges were mined with demolition chambers. Hamp Bridge was prepared for demolition with four small charge chambers under the east side of the arch containing a total of 30 lb (14 kg) of the explosive, ammonal. Anti-tank obstacles were placed at bridge sites or locks to hinder bridging operations. All of the swing bridges were removed, but were then replaced with fixed timber bridges at towpath level. Only essential maintenance was carried out, to ensure a water supply for fire-fighting and to prevent flooding. Although the physical structure of the canal was not damaged by enemy action, all of the company records and traffic receipts, together with those of the Bristol and Exeter Railway, were destroyed during a bombing raid.

Control of the canal passed into public ownership with the Transport Act 1947. Despite concerted efforts, the Conservators could not make any progress with the removal of the fixed low-level bridges, which prevented maintenance from being carried out. The Inland Waterways Association started to take an active interest in the restoration of the canal from 1952, but this was resisted by the British Transport Commission, who padlocked the lock gates to prevent them being used. Despite this, a team of seven men was employed to maintain the infrastructure through this period. The maintenance of the channel enabled the canal to become one of the first to be used for the commercial transport of water, which was pumped from the canal to Durleigh reservoir from 1962 onwards.

The canal was absorbed by the British Waterways Board in 1962. The Conservators carried out an annual inspection in 1965, the first since 1947, but had to use a motor coach for most of the journey, as the locks were unusable. With the passing of the Transport Act 1968, the canal was classified as a remainder waterway – little more than a drainage channel. Only essential maintenance to keep it safe was to be carried out. Soon afterwards, part of the cutting wall between West Street and Albert Street collapsed, and although the bed of the canal was cleared to ensure water could reach the dock, the towpath remained blocked for another nine years. Bridgwater Docks, which had been used by a small amount of coastal shipping, were finally closed in 1971: the connection at the docks was stopped up, and the British Waterways Board were granted permission to cease maintaining the canal for navigation.

== Restoration ==
From the late 1960s, there was a growing awareness of the benefits of retaining the canal. The Inland Waterways Association produced a report, entitled The Bridgwater and Taunton Canal - Waterway with a Future, suggesting that the canal had the potential for development as a linear Country Park, and the County Planning Officer for Somerset County Council produced a second report, suggesting that funds should be made available for maintenance and restoration, which the County Council duly adopted. The Countryside Act 1968 provided a framework for such action, and a visit in 1971 to see the work being done on the Monmouthshire and Brecon Canal as part of the creation of the Brecon Beacons National Park convinced the Council of the wisdom of such a course of action. By 1974, Higher and Lower Maunsel locks, which are listed buildings, had been refurbished by the British Waterways Board, with funding from the County Council. Funding for towpath maintenance and weed cutting was also provided.

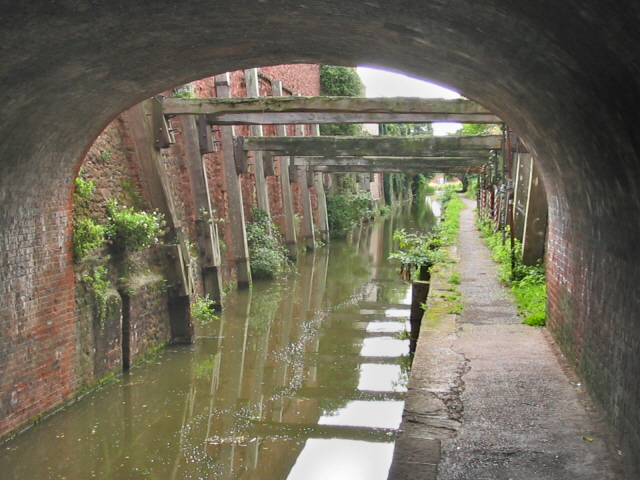
The canal emerging from the tunnel beneath West Street, showing the timbers used to shore up the cutting walls after their partial collapse in 1968

In December 1974, the council bought Bridgwater Dock from British Railways. The concrete wall across the barge lock was removed, but there was no intention to restore the ship lock. By 1980, the council had invested over £50,000 in the restoration, which included Kings and Standards locks, and the bottom gates of Newtown Lock. Some bridges had been raised, but only to 4 feet (1.2 m), which allowed canoeing, but prevented bigger boats from using the waterway. Work on the deep cutting between West Street and Albert Street started in September 1978, jointly funded by the county council and Sedgemoor District Council, using direct labour, while a Manpower Services Commission scheme to dredge the canal from the dock to the cutting and to widen the towpath was funded by the District Council in 1981.

The condition of the swing bridge at Bathpool caused a change in policy. There were objections to the plan to replace it with a fixed bridge with limited headroom, and the planning application was deferred. By 1983, a six-year plan to restore the canal was fully costed, and it was adopted by the British Waterways Board, the county council, Sedgemoor District Council and Taunton Deane Borough Council in the following year. The scheme was supported by the West Country Branch of the Inland Waterways Association, who offered the services of the Waterway Recovery Group, to do some of the work. The swing bridges at Crossways, Boat and Anchor, and Fordgate were rebuilt, and by 1987, 4.5 miles (7.2 km) of canal were available for navigation. After some teething problems, it was decided that many of the rest of the accommodation bridges would be raised to give 8 feet (2.4 m) of headroom, rather than rebuilding them as swing bridges. Restoration of the bridges at the Taunton end continued during the early 1990s, and the canal was finally re-opened in 1994.

== Current use ==
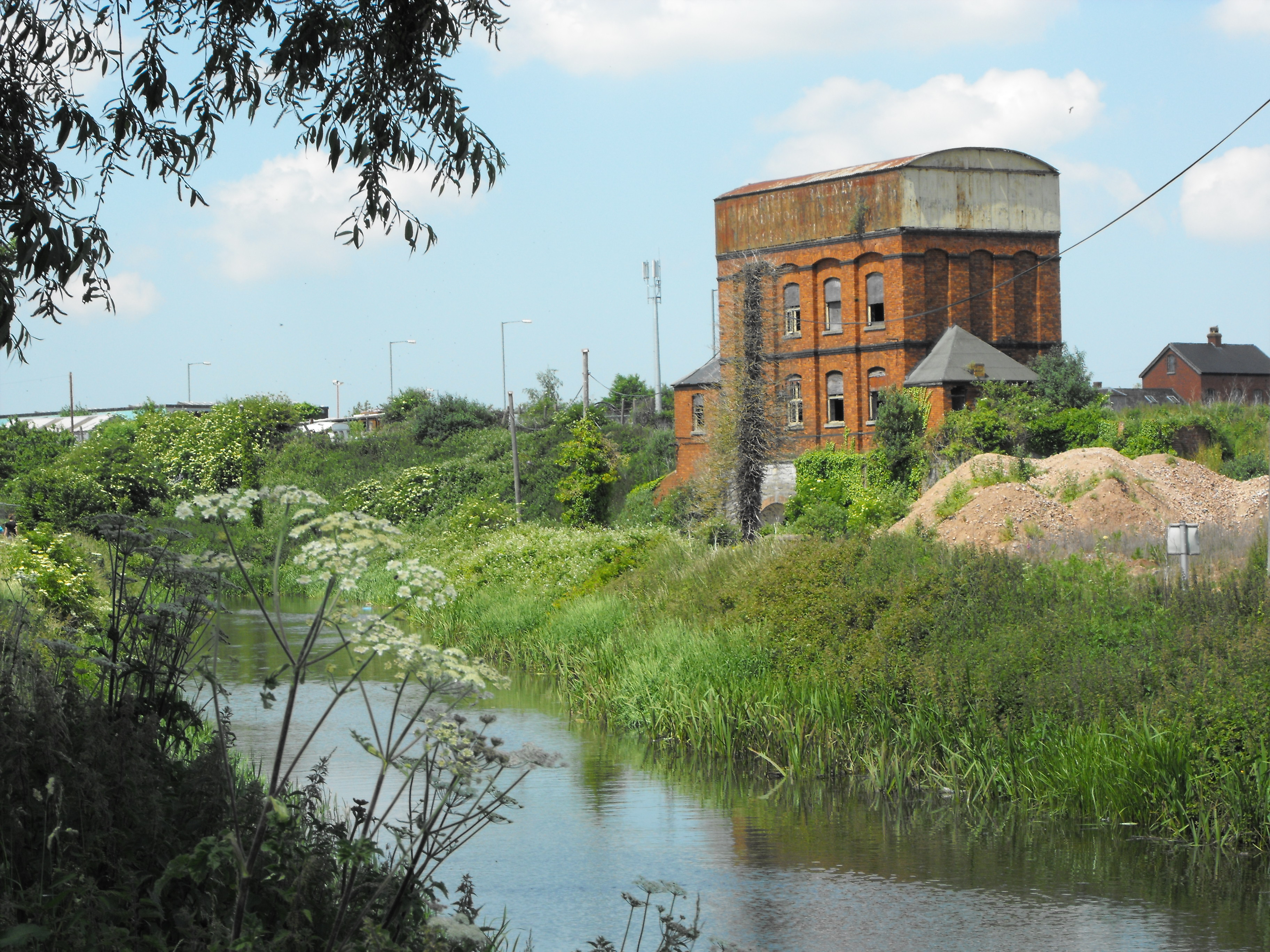
The canal in Taunton at its end, near the old railway depot

Boating on the canal is encouraged, although the lack of a link to the River Parrett at Bridgwater is restrictive. At this point, the Parrett is a salt water river, and is laden with silt, whereas the canal contains fresh water. Not only is there a risk of silt entering the canal, but the salt water cannot be allowed to contaminate the fresh, as the canal is still used for the transport of drinking water for the population of Bridgwater. The canal forms part of the local flood relief system, in winter taking water from the River Tone at Taunton and discharging it into the Parrett at a sluice in the western fringe of Bridgwater, near the Bridgwater Canalside Centre.

Bridgwater Docks, in which the tidal basin, locks, quaysides, bridges and fittings are listed buildings, is now a marina, emptied of boats in 2021, and the old warehouse, built in 1840–50 has been converted into apartments, with new apartment blocks built nearby. The only commercially active industry located at the docks was Bowering's Animal Feed Mill, until its closure in 2020. The towpath forms part of Sustrans' National Cycle Network route NCR-3 connecting Bath and Cornwall, and attracts numerous travellers. Plans have been proposed for the upgrading of the towpath and development of a visitor centre at Maunsel.

During 2020, the boats were ordered to leave the docks at Bridgwater, however as of 2023, there has been a £5m grant to restore the docks and canal.

== The Somerset Space Walk ==
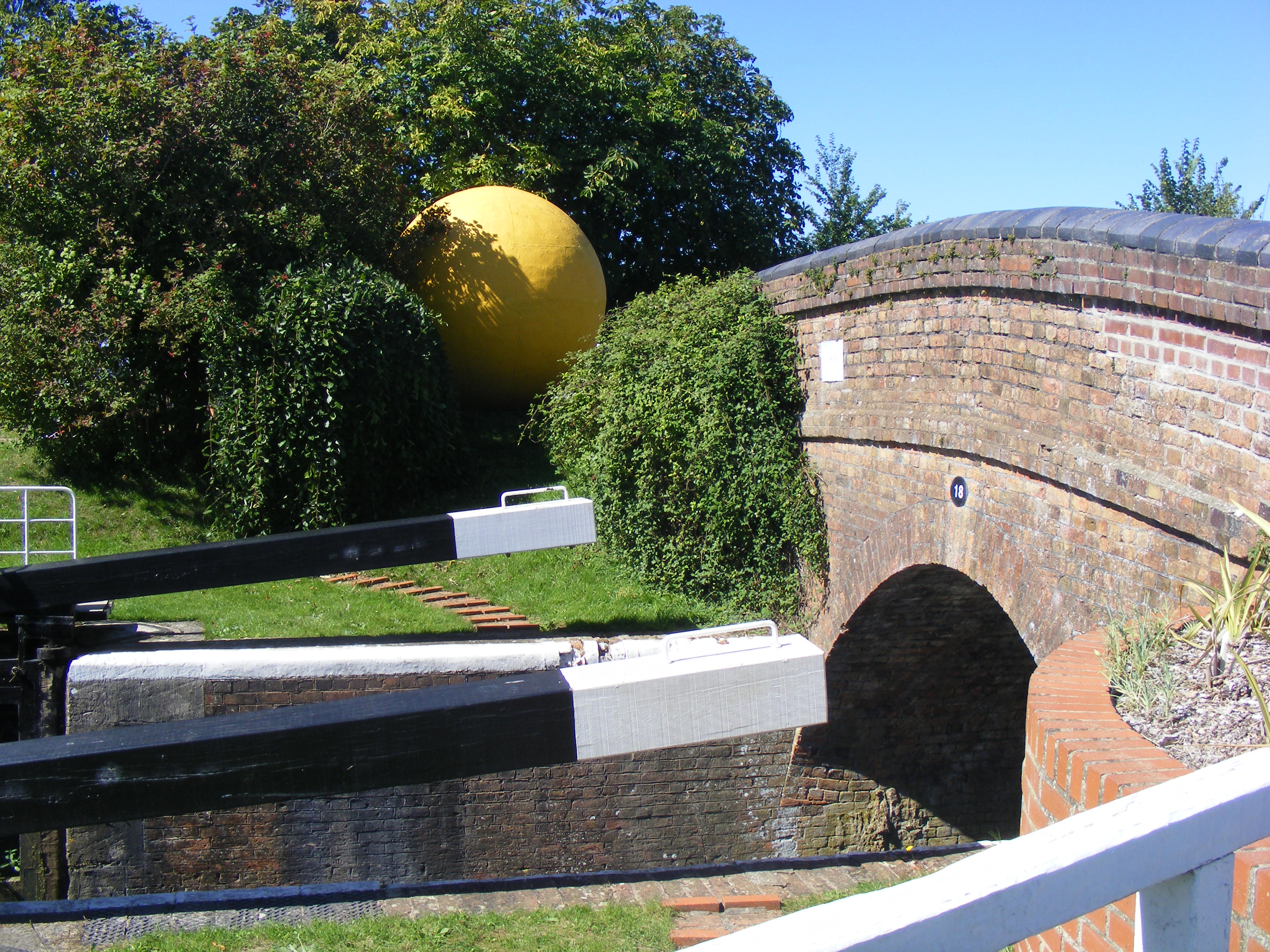
Maunsel Lock, showing the model of the Sun at the centre of the two sets of planets

The Taunton-Bridgwater canal is also home to an installation termed the 'Somerset Space Walk', a scale model (530 million:1) of the Solar System centred around the 'Sun' at Maunsel lock with the planets located along the towpath in both directions. The Space Walk was designed by local man, Pip Youngman, in order to demonstrate the scale of the Solar System in an interactive way. The trail can be walked either from Taunton's Brewhouse Theatre to Maunsel Lock (Pluto to the Sun) or from Bridgwater's Morrison's Supermarket to Maunsel Lock (also Pluto to the Sun) or of course, vice versa. From Pluto to the Sun from either town is an 11-kilometre (6.8 mi) walk.

== Route ==
Point	Coordinates (Links to map resources)	OS Grid Ref	Notes
Firepool Lock	51.022°N 3.098°W	ST230253	Junction with River Tone
Chard Canal Junction	51.026°N 3.043°W	ST269256	defunct
Creech Pumping Station	51.030°N 3.018°W	ST287261	derelict
Higher Maunsel Lock	51.059°N 2.989°W	ST307293	
Lower Maunsel Lock	51.063°N 2.989°W	ST307297	
Kings Lock	51.077°N 2.993°W	ST305313	
Standards Lock	51.081°N 2.977°W	ST316317	
Fordgate swing bridge	51.089°N 2.970°W	ST32163263	
Huntworth Basin	51.115°N 2.987°W	ST309355	defunct
Bridgwater Docks	51.132°N 3.005°W	ST297375	No connection with River Parrett

== See also ==
- Canals of the United Kingdom
- History of the British canal system

== Bibliography ==
- Cumberlidge, Jane (2009). Inland Waterways of Great Britain (8th Ed.). St Ives, Cambridgeshire: Imray Laurie Norie and Wilson Ltd. ISBN 978-0-85288-355-6.
- Hadfield, Charles (1985) [1967]. The Canals of South West England (2nd ed.). Newton Abbot, Devon: David and Charles. ISBN 978-0-7153-4176-6.
- Hardcastle, Peter (2006). "Bridgwater and Taunton Canal - the roots". Somerset4u. Archived from the original on 1 October 2008.
- Harrison, Samuel Bealey; Henry, Jeremy (1835). An Analytical Digest of All the Reported Cases Determined in the House of Lords, the Several Courts of Common Law, in Banc and at Nisi Prius, and the Court of Bankruptcy: And Also the Crown Cases Reserved ... Together with a Full Selection of Equity Decisions, with the Manuscript Cases ... Desilver, Thomas. Archived from the original on 24 December 2016.
- Haskell, Tony (1994). By Waterway to Taunton. Somerset: Somerset Books. ISBN 978-0-86183-260-6.
- Haskell, Tony (2007). By Waterway to Taunton: The Bridgwater and Taunton Canal. Stroud: Tempus Publishing. ISBN 978-0-7524-4267-9.
- Otter, R. A. (1994). Civil Engineering Heritage. Thomas Telford Publishers. ISBN 978-0-7277-1971-3.
- Priestley, Joseph (1831). "Historical Account of the Navigable Rivers, Canals, and Railways of Great Britain". Archived from the original on 12 March 2016.
