= Operation Lucid =

1940 British anti-invasion fire ship plan

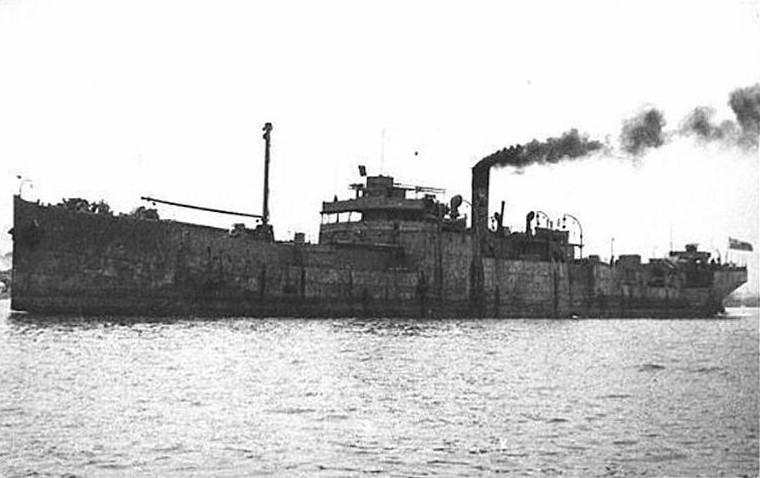
- RFA War Nawab
- Planned: 1940–1941
- Planned by: United Kingdom
- Objective: Defence of Britain against German invasion
- Executed by: Royal Navy
- Outcome: Cancelled

Operation Lucid was a British plan to use fire ships to attack invasion barges that were gathering in ports on the northern coast of France in preparation for a German invasion of Britain in 1940. The attack was initiated several times in September and October that year but unreliable ships and unfavourable weather caused the plan to be aborted on each occasion.

== Inception ==
Following the fall of France in July 1940, the Germans threatened to invade Britain. The British Government made strenuous efforts to meet the invasion and also sought to attack the Germans before any landings took place. As invasion barges were seen to gather in French ports along the English Channel, the Royal Air Force (RAF) was sent to attack them by bombing.

Experiments by the Petroleum Warfare Department (PWD) aimed to burn the invasion barges before they could reach the English shore. The first idea was simply to explode a vessel filled with oil, and this was tried at Maplin Sands where a Thames oil tanker, Suffolk, with 50 t (49 long tons) of petroleum was blown up in shallow water. Another idea was that oil should be held in place on the water by a trough formed from coir matting. A machine formed the trough from a flat mat as it was paid out over the stern of a ship. Trials with the Ben Hann produced a flaming ribbon 880 yd (800 m) × 6 ft (1.8 m) that could be towed at 4 kn (4.6 mph; 7.4 km/h). Neither idea proved workable.

Suffolk provided a trial for a more ambitious scheme to burn invasion barges before they left port. The plan was first floated in early June and July 1940 and became known as Operation Lucid. Lucid had the backing of Churchill. The idea of using fire ships against Hitler's invasion just as the English had attacked the Spanish Armada in 1588 appealed to Churchill's sense of history. Recalling a pre-emptive attack by Sir Francis Drake, Churchill said that just as Drake had "singed the King of Spain's beard", he wanted to "singe Mr Hitler's moustache".

== Preparation ==
Captain Augustus Agar, an officer of the Royal Navy, who had been awarded the Victoria Cross (VC) in 1918, was chosen to lead the operation. Agar chose Morgan Morgan-Giles as his staff officer because of his experience with setting explosive charges.

Oil tankers were required for the operation but these were in short supply. Only the "oldest crocks laid up in our rivers and creeks which had not been to sea for years and were useless except for scrap metal" could be spared. Workers were put to the task of coaxing three of these old crocks back into service. Time was of the essence and Agar regretted that for the sake of secrecy he could not tell the workmen what the ships were for, he was certain that they would have worked more enthusiastically had they known the truth. A rumour was put about that they were to be used as blockships. Another problem with secrecy was the difficulty in acquiring reliable motor-boats on which the crew would escape; there was an unwillingness to release good boats to equip ancient oilers and there was a last minute panic to get speed-boats. Oakfield (the former War Africain), and Royal Fleet Auxiliary (RFA) ships RFA War Nawab and War Nizam, having been laid up for years, were now coaxed back into service but they were slow – less than six knots – and unreliable.

The Palmers Shipbuilding and Iron Company had built War Nizam in 1918 and War Nawab in 1919. Both ships were 412 ft (126 m) long and 52 ft 4 in (15.95 m) abeam with a draft of 25 ft 7 in (7.80 m) and a gross register tonnage of 5,586 for Nawab and 5,605 for Nizam. Oakfield had been built in 1918 with a grt of 5,218, 401 ft (122 m) long and 52 ft 3 in (15.93 m) abeam.

The ships were quickly made ready and each filled with 2,000–3,000 long tons (2,000–3,000 t) Agar's Special Mixture a cocktail of 50 per cent heavy fuel oil, 25 per cent diesel oil and 25 per cent petrol developed by the PWD. The leaky bulkheads caused the engine rooms of War Nawab to fill with fumes that caused men to pass out and later resulted in the harbourmaster concluding that the crew were drunk. To this lethal load, bundles of cordite, gun cotton and old depth charges were added to give the ships more punch. The idea was to sail at night until the fire ships were near the entrances of the target ports. All but two or three of the crew would be taken off, detonation timers would be set and each ship put to its final heading towards a harbour mouth. The remaining crew would escape in a motor boat at the last minute. When the explosives detonated, the fire ship's hold would rupture and with a ship in, or as close as possible to, the harbour mouth, a slick of burning fuel would be drawn into the harbour by the rising tide.

Chief Petty Officer Ronald Apps recalled,

In July 1940, I joined a Royal Fleet Auxiliary tanker – the War African – that was anchored off Sheerness for an idea that I have always assumed was thought up by Churchill. These tankers were filled up with fuel oil and there were mines and detonators down in the holds. The idea was that we would run them over to Boulogne and about five or six miles out of the harbour, we would set the controls and lash them – with the boilers going full bore – and run them into Boulogne harbour and let them blow up, to destroy the potential German invasion fleet. It was called Operation Lucid and we spent four weeks preparing. We practised setting the controls and evacuating the ship with two speedboats alongside us which had been commandeered from Southend. These speedboats were remarkable things. They could go at 35 or 40 knots and the idea was that at the blowing of a whistle, we had to rush down, get in the boats and we were away. Those four weeks were a bit hairy because the tanker was full up with fuel oil when it came to us and it was primed and ready to explode and there were air raids at night. When you're in a tanker, sitting on all this explosive material and the Germans are coming over and dropping bombs, it's not very ... shall I say 'sleep inspiring' experience. I got round to the idea that I had to sleep or I wouldn't be able to walk around the next day.

— [ellipsis in original]

== Execution and cancellation ==
Late in the afternoon of 26 September 1940, War Nizam and Oakfield set sail from Sheerness and headed towards Calais and War Nawab set sail from Portsmouth to Boulogne. A diversionary bombardment by the RAF was also ordered against Ostend. A number of destroyers, motor torpedo boats and other vessels escorted the fireships. Agar commanded the operation from the destroyer HMS Campbell. An unfavourable wind blew up and Oakfield soon dropped out; a little later War Nizam suffered boiler problems, leaving only War Nawab to continue. Unwilling to sacrifice the element of surprise and under orders from Churchill not to hesitate to call things off if the plan did not go well, Agar cancelled the operation. The recall reached Nawab 7 nmi (8.1 mi; 13 km) from Boulogne. Another attempt was made on 3 October, this was thwarted by bad weather, as was an attempt for the following night. On the night of 7/8 October, an acoustic mine damaged an escorting destroyer with Agar on board; the convoy scattered and the destroyer limped home. Plans were made for another attempt in early November but by then Hitler had postponed Operation Sealion and the Admiralty correspondingly postponed Operation Lucid. The plan was revived in the spring of 1941 but never put into action.

War Nawab continued in service as an oil hulk until being broken up in 1958. In 1962, her ship's bell was remounted on the quarterdeck of the Royal New Zealand Navy's Sea Cadet unit based at Wanganui on New Zealand's North Island.

== See also ==
- List of Royal Fleet Auxiliary ship names
- British anti-invasion preparations of World War II
- SS Sansinena
