= British anti-invasion preparations of the Second World War =

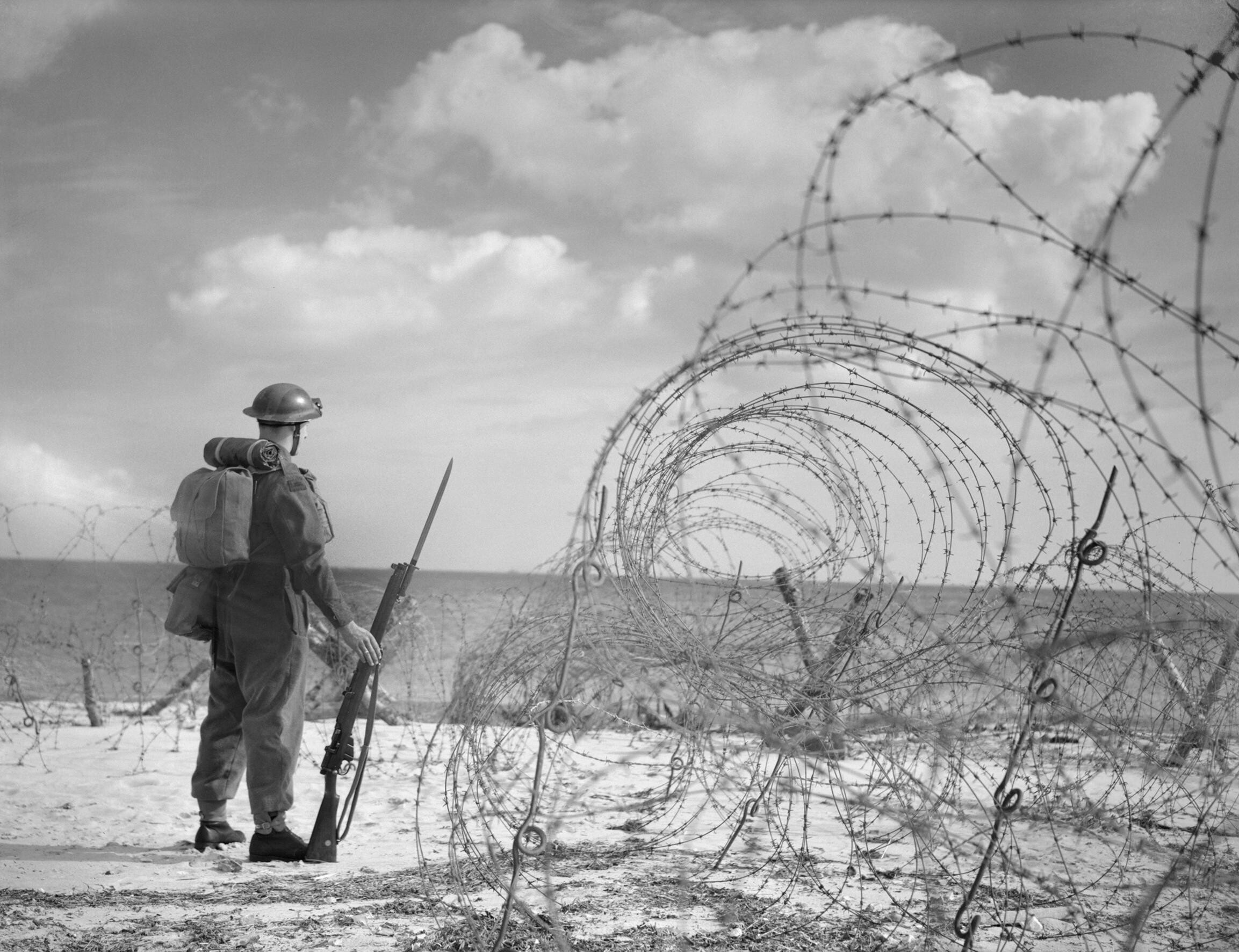
A British soldier on a beach in Southern England, 7 October 1940

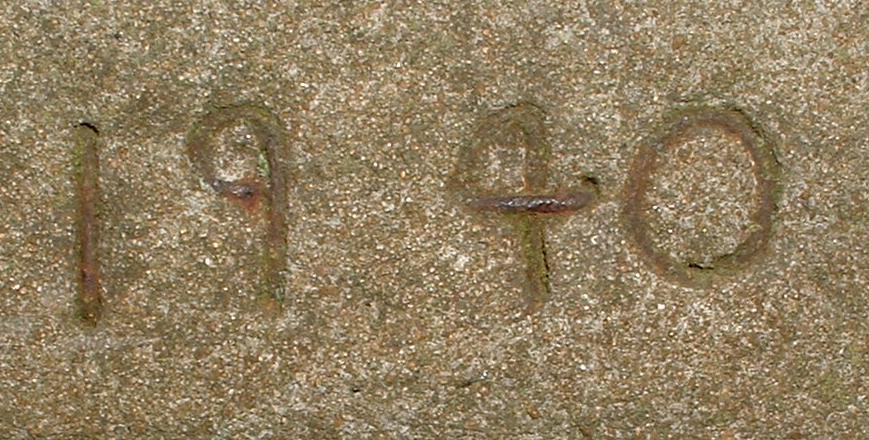
Detail from a pillbox embrasure

British anti-invasion preparations of the Second World War entailed a large-scale division of military and civilian mobilisation in response to the threat of invasion (Operation Sea Lion) by German armed forces in 1940 and 1941. The British Army needed to recover from the defeat of the British Expeditionary Force in France, and 1.5 million men were enrolled as part-time soldiers in the Home Guard. The rapid construction of field fortifications transformed much of the United Kingdom, especially southern England, into a prepared battlefield. Sea Lion was never taken beyond the preliminary assembly of forces. Today, little remains of Britain's anti-invasion preparations, although reinforced concrete structures such as pillboxes and anti-tank cubes can still be commonly found, particularly in the coastal counties.

== Political and military background ==
On 1 September 1939, Germany invaded Poland; two days later, Britain and France declared war on Germany, launching the Second World War. Within three weeks, the Red Army of the Soviet Union invaded the eastern regions of Poland in fulfilment of the secret Molotov–Ribbentrop Pact with Germany. A British Expeditionary Force (BEF) was sent to the Franco-Belgian border, but Britain and France did not take any direct action in support of the Poles. By 1 October, Poland had been completely overrun. There was little fighting over the months that followed. In a period known as the Phoney War, soldiers on both sides trained for war and the French and British constructed and manned defences on the eastern borders of France.

However, the British War Cabinet became concerned about exaggerated intelligence reports, aided by German disinformation, of large airborne forces which could be launched against Britain. At the insistence of Winston Churchill, then the First Lord of the Admiralty, a request was made that the Commander-in-Chief, Home Forces, General Sir Walter Kirke, should prepare a plan to repel a large-scale invasion. Kirke presented his plan on 15 November 1939, known as "Plan Julius Caesar" or "Plan J-C" because of the code word "Julius" which would be used for a likely invasion and "Caesar" for an imminent invasion. Kirke, whose main responsibility was to reinforce the BEF in France, had very limited resources available, with six poorly trained and equipped Territorial Army divisions in England, two in Scotland and three more in reserve. With France still a powerful ally, Kirke believed that the eastern coasts of England and Scotland were the most vulnerable, with ports and airfields given priority.

On 9 April 1940, Germany invaded Denmark and Norway. This operation preempted Britain's own plans to invade Norway. Denmark surrendered immediately, and, after a short-lived attempt by the British to make a stand in the northern part of the country, Norway also fell. The invasion of Norway was a combined forces operation in which the German war machine projected its power across the sea; this German success would come to be seen by the British as a dire portent. On 7 and 8 May 1940, the Norway Debate in the British House of Commons revealed intense dissatisfaction with, and some outright hostility toward, the government of Prime Minister Neville Chamberlain. Two days later Chamberlain resigned and was succeeded by Churchill.

On 10 May 1940, Germany invaded France. By that time, the BEF consisted of 10 infantry divisions in three corps, a tank brigade and a Royal Air Force detachment of around 500 aircraft. The BEF and the best French forces were pinned by the German attack into Belgium and the Netherlands, but were then outflanked by the main attack that came behind them through the Ardennes Forest by highly mobile Panzer divisions of the Wehrmacht, overrunning any defences that could be improvised in their path. In fierce fighting, most of the BEF were able to avoid being surrounded by withdrawing to a small area around the French port of Dunkirk. With the Germans now on the coast of France, it became evident that an urgent reassessment needed to be given to the possibility of having to resist an attempted invasion of Britain by German forces.

== British armed forces ==
=== British Army ===
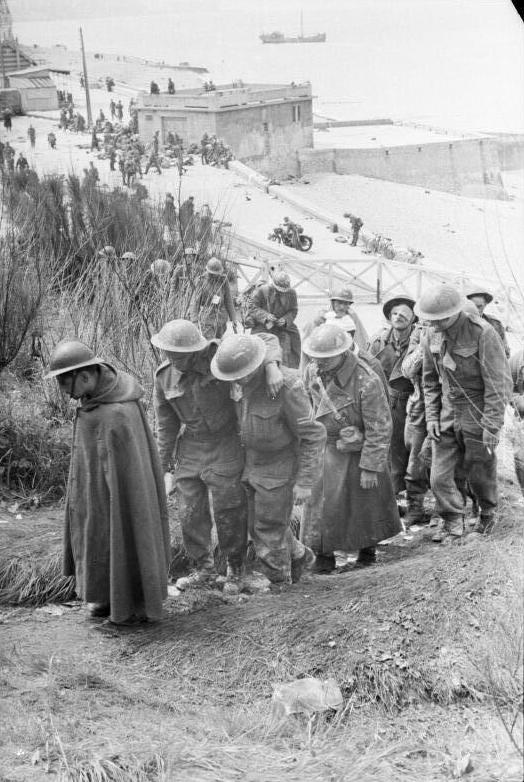
Captured British and French soldiers help one another on the staircase up to the cliff at Veules-les-Roses, June 1940.

The evacuation of British and French forces (Operation Dynamo) began on 26 May with air cover provided by the Royal Air Force at great cost. Over the following ten days, 338,226 French and British soldiers were evacuated to Britain. Most of the personnel were brought back to Britain, but many of the army's vehicles, tanks, guns, ammunition and heavy equipment and the RAF's ground equipment and stores were left behind. Some soldiers even returned without their rifles. A further 215,000 were evacuated from ports south of the Channel in the more organised Operation Aerial during June.

In June 1940 the British Army had 22 infantry divisions and one armoured division. The infantry divisions were, on average, at half strength, and had only one-sixth of their normal artillery. Over 600 medium guns, both 18/25-pdr and 25-pounders, and 280 howitzers were available, with a further hundred 25-pounders manufactured in June. Over 300 4.5-inch howitzers – 900 were modified in 1940 alone – and some 60-pounder howitzers and their modified 4.5-inch version as well as antiquated examples of the 6-inch howitzer were recovered from reserve after the loss of current models in France. These were augmented with several hundred additional 75 mm M1917 guns and their ammunition from the US. Some sources also state the British army was lacking in transport (just over 2,000 Universal Carriers were available, rising to over 3,000 by the end of July). There was a desperate shortage of ammunition such that little could be spared for training.

Records show that the British possessed over 290 million rounds of .303 ammunition of various types on 7 June, rising to over 400 million in August. VII Corps was formed to control the Home Forces' general reserve, and included the 1st Armoured Division. In a reorganisation in July, the divisions with some degree of mobility were placed behind the "coastal crust" of defended beach areas from The Wash to Newhaven in Sussex. The General Headquarters Reserve was expanded to two corps of the most capable units. VII Corps was based at Headley Court in Surrey to the south of London and comprised the 1st Armoured Division and 1st Canadian Division with the 1st Army Tank Brigade. IV Corps was based at Latimer House to the north of London and comprised 2nd Armoured Division, the 42nd (East Lancashire) Infantry Division and the 43rd (Wessex) Infantry Division. VII Corps also included a brigade, which had been diverted to England when on its way to Egypt, from the 2nd New Zealand Expeditionary Force. Two infantry brigades and corps troops including artillery, engineers and medical personnel from the 6th Australian Division were also deployed to the country between June 1940 and January 1941 as part of the Second Australian Imperial Force in the United Kingdom.

The number of tanks in Britain increased rapidly between June and September 1940 (mid-September being the theoretical planned date for the launch of Operation Sea Lion) as follows:

Tanks in Britain
Date	Light	Cruiser	Infantry
10 Jun 1940	292	0	74
1 Jul 1940	265	118	119
4 Aug 1940	336	173	189
To Egypt	−52	−52	−50
27 Aug 1940	295	138	185
15 Sept 1940	306	154	224

These figures do not include training tanks or tanks under repair.

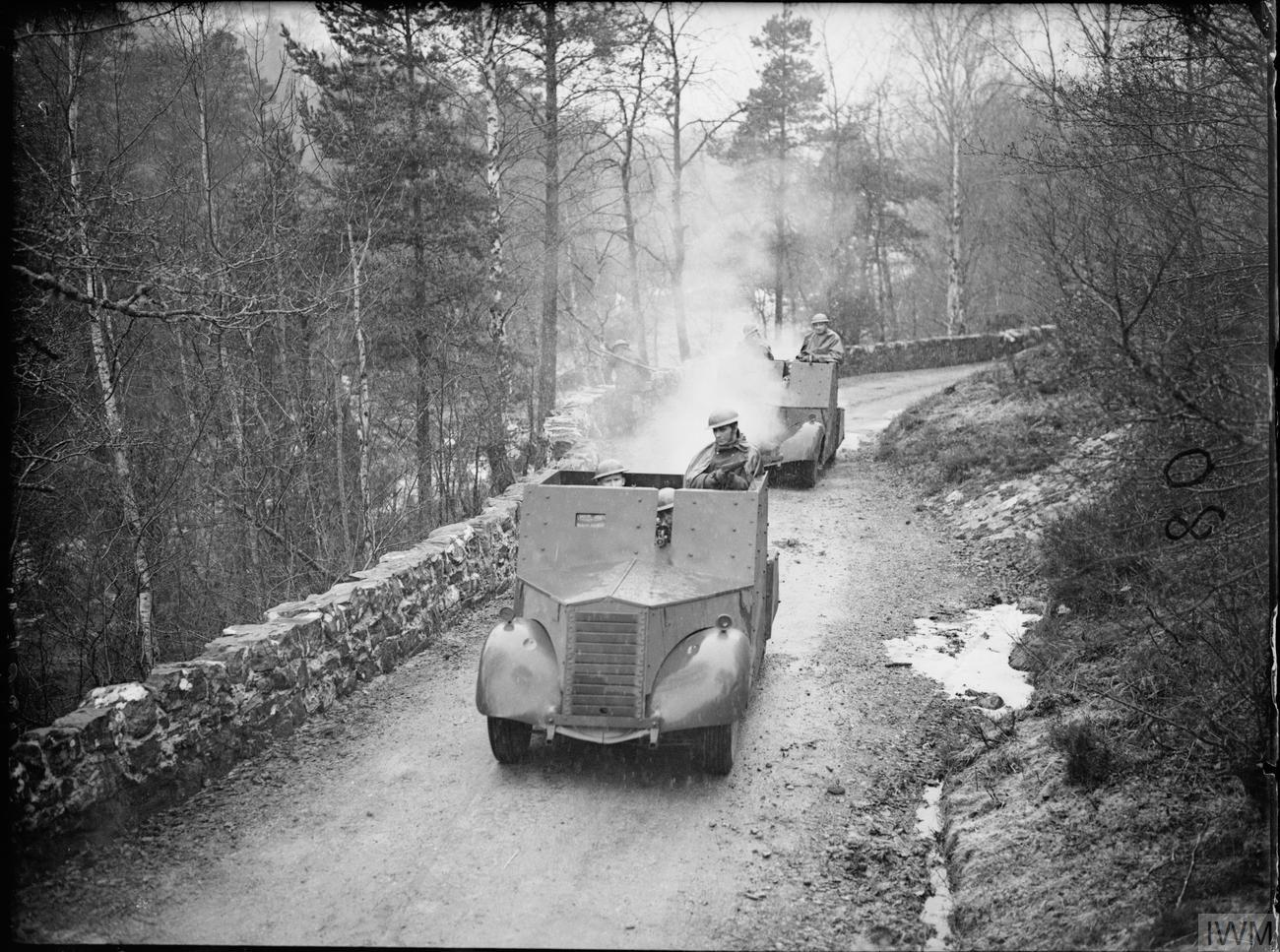
Standard Mk II Beaverette light reconnaissance cars manned by members of the Home Guard in the Highlands of Scotland, 14 February 1941

The light tanks were mostly the Mark VIB and the cruiser tanks were Mark I , Mark II and Mk IVs. The infantry tanks included 27 obsolete Matilda Is but the rest were almost all the capable Matilda II. The first Valentine infantry tanks were delivered in May 1940 for trials and 109 had been built by the end of September. In the aftermath of Dunkirk some tank regiments, such as the 4th/7th Royal Dragoon Guards, were expected to go into action as infantry armed with little more than rifles and light machine guns. In June 1940 the regiment received the Beaverette, an improvised armoured car developed by order of the Minister of Aircraft Production Lord Beaverbrook, and former holiday coaches for use as personnel carriers. It did not receive tanks until April 1941 and then it was the problematic Covenanter cruiser tank.

Churchill stated "in the last half of September we were able to bring into action on the south coast front sixteen divisions of high quality of which three were armoured divisions or their equivalent in brigades". It is significant that the British Government felt sufficiently confident in Britain's ability to repel an invasion (and in its tank production factories) that it sent 154 tanks (52 light, 52 cruiser and 50 infantry) to Egypt in mid-August. At this time, Britain's factories were almost matching German output in tanks, that by 1941, they surpassed.

=== Home Guard ===
On 14 May 1940, Secretary of State for War Anthony Eden announced the creation of the Local Defence Volunteers (LDV) – later to become known as the Home Guard. Far more men volunteered than the government expected and by the end of June, there were nearly 1.5 million volunteers. There were plenty of personnel for the defence of the country, but there were no uniforms (a simple armband had to suffice) and equipment was in critically short supply. At first, the Home Guard was armed with guns in private ownership, knives or bayonets fastened to poles, Molotov cocktails and improvised flamethrowers.

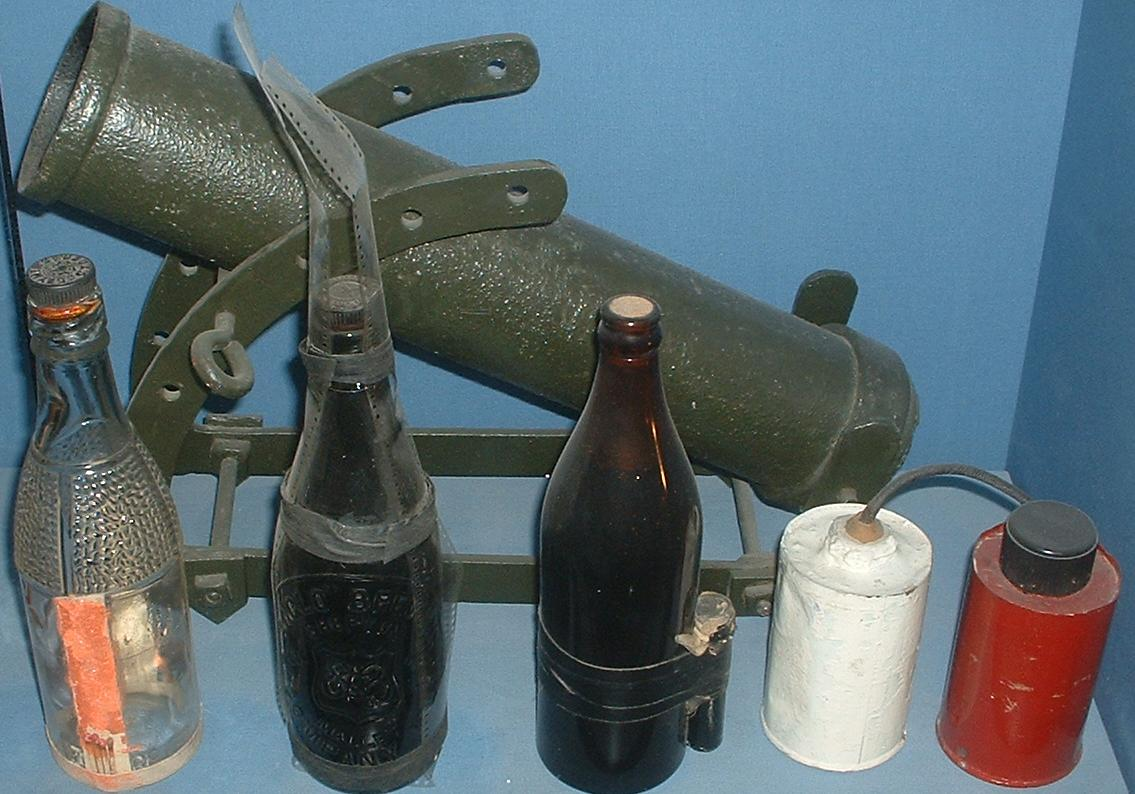
Home Guard improvised weapons

By July 1940 the situation had improved radically as all volunteers received uniforms and a modicum of training. 500,000 modern M1917 Enfield Rifles, 25,000 M1918 Browning Automatic Rifles and millions of rounds of ammunition were bought from the reserve stock of the U.S. armed forces, and rushed by special trains directly to Home Guard units. New weapons were developed that could be produced cheaply without consuming materials that were needed to produce armaments for the regular units. An early example was the No. 76 Special Incendiary Grenade, a glass bottle filled with highly flammable material of which more than six million were made.

The sticky bomb was a glass flask filled with nitroglycerin and given an adhesive coating allowing it to be glued to a passing vehicle. In theory, it could be thrown, but in practice it would most likely need to be placed – thumped against the target with sufficient force to stick – requiring courage and good fortune to be used effectively. An order for one million sticky bombs was placed in June 1940, but various problems delayed their distribution in large numbers until early 1941, and it is likely that fewer than 250,000 were produced.

A measure of mobility was provided by bicycles, motorcycles, private vehicles and horses. A few units were equipped with armoured cars, some of which were of standard design, but many were improvised locally from commercially available vehicles by the attachment of steel plates. By 1941 the Home Guard had been issued with a series of "sub-artillery", a term used to describe hastily produced and unconventional anti-tank or infantry support weapons, including the Blacker Bombard (an anti-tank spigot mortar throwing a 20 lb 'bomb'), the Northover Projector (a black-powder mortar), and the Smith Gun (a small smoothbore artillery gun that could be towed by a private motorcar).

=== Royal Air Force ===
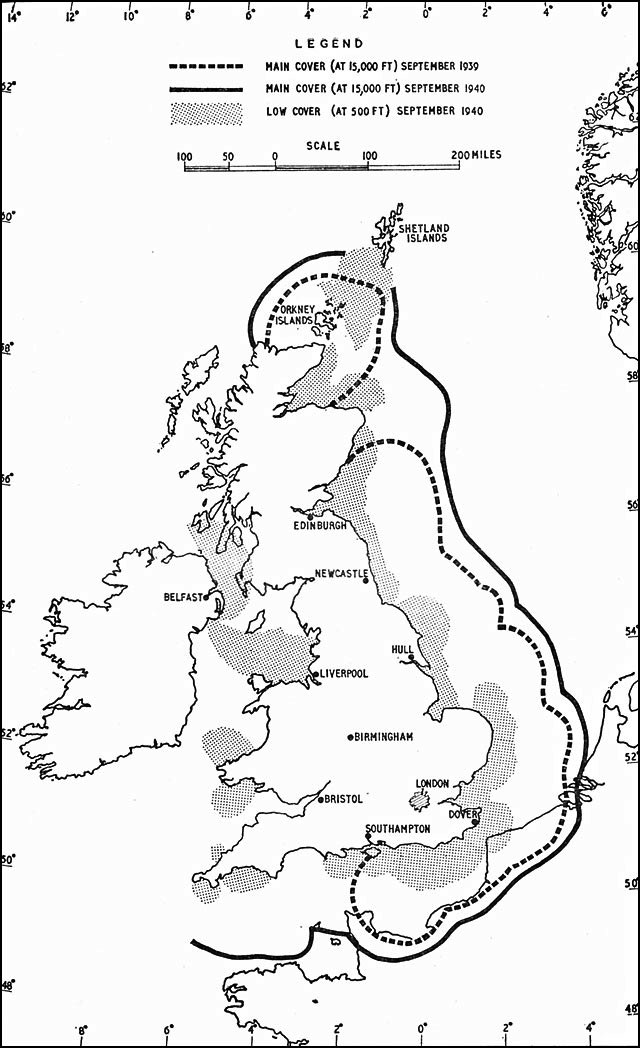
Chain Home radar coverage. High-level coverage in September 1939 (dashed lines) and September 1940 (solid lines).

In mid-1940, the principal concern of the Royal Air Force, together with elements of the Fleet Air Arm, was to contest the control of British airspace with the German Luftwaffe. For the Germans, achieving at least local air superiority was an essential prerequisite to any invasion and might even break British morale, forcing them to sue for peace.

If the German air force had prevailed and attempted a landing, a much-reduced Royal Air Force would have been obliged to operate from airfields well away from the southeast of England. Any airfield that was in danger of being captured would have been made inoperable and there were plans to remove all portable equipment from vulnerable radar bases and completely destroy anything that could not be moved. Whatever was left of the RAF would have been committed to intercepting the invasion fleet in concert with the Royal Navy – to fly in the presence of an enemy that enjoys air superiority is very dangerous. However, the RAF would have kept several advantages, such as being able to operate largely over friendly territory, as well as having the ability to fly for longer as, until the Germans were able to operate from airfields in England, Luftwaffe pilots would still have to fly significant distances to reach their operational area.

A contingency plan called Operation Banquet required all available aircraft to be committed to the defence. In the event of invasion almost anything that was not a fighter would be converted to a bomber – student pilots, some in the very earliest stages of training, would use around 350 Tiger Moth and Magister trainers to drop 20 lb (9.1 kg) bombs from rudimentary bomb racks.

Shortly before the outbreak of the Second World War the Chain Home radar system began to be installed in the south of England, with three radar stations being operational by 1937. Although the German High Command suspected that the British may have been developing these systems, Zeppelin detection and evaluation flights had proved inconclusive. As a result, the Germans underestimated the effectiveness of the expanding Chain Home radar system, which became a vital piece of Britain's defensive capabilities during the Battle of Britain. By the start of the war, around 20 Chain Home stations had been built in the UK; to supplement these and detect aircraft at lower altitudes, the Chain Home Low was also being constructed.

=== Royal Navy ===
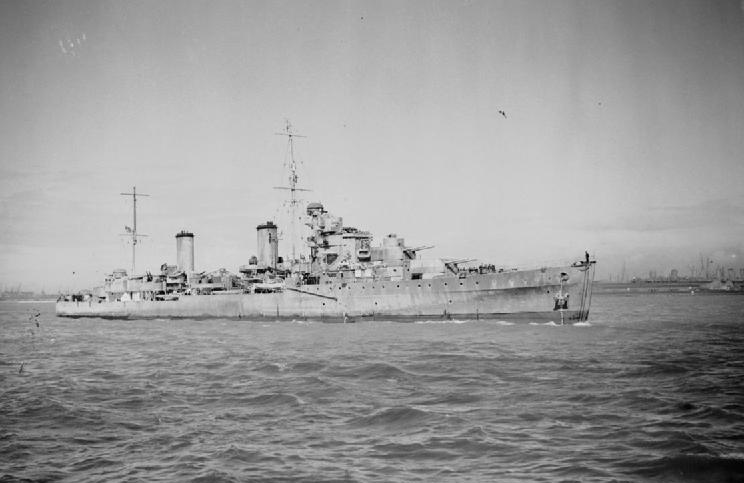
The light cruiser HMS Aurora that bombarded Boulogne on 8 September 1940

Although much larger with many more ships, the Royal Navy, unlike the Kriegsmarine, had many commitments, including against Japan and guarding Scotland and Northern England. The Royal Navy could overwhelm any force that the German Navy could muster but would require time to get its forces in position since they were dispersed, partly because of these commitments and partly to reduce the risk of air attack. On 1 July 1940, one cruiser and 23 destroyers were committed to escort duties in the Western Approaches, plus 12 destroyers and one cruiser on the Tyne and the aircraft carrier Argus (I49). More immediately available were ten destroyers at the south coast ports of Dover and Portsmouth, a cruiser and three destroyers at Sheerness on the River Thames, three cruisers and seven destroyers at the Humber, nine destroyers at Harwich, and two cruisers at Rosyth. The rest of the Home Fleet – five battleships, three cruisers and nine destroyers – was based far to the north at Scapa Flow. There were, in addition, many corvettes, minesweepers, and other small vessels. By the end of July, a dozen additional destroyers were transferred from escort duties to the defence of the homeland, and more would join the Home Fleet shortly after.

At the end of August, the battleship HMS Rodney was sent south to Rosyth for anti-invasion duties. She was joined on 13 September by her sister ship HMS Nelson, the battlecruiser HMS Hood, three anti-aircraft cruisers and a destroyer flotilla. On 14 September, the old battleship HMS Revenge was moved to Plymouth, also specifically in case of invasion. In addition to these major units, by the beginning of September the Royal Navy had stationed along the south coast of England between Plymouth and Harwich, 4 light cruisers and 57 destroyers tasked with repelling any invasion attempt, a force many times larger than the ships that the Germans had available as naval escorts.

== Field fortifications ==
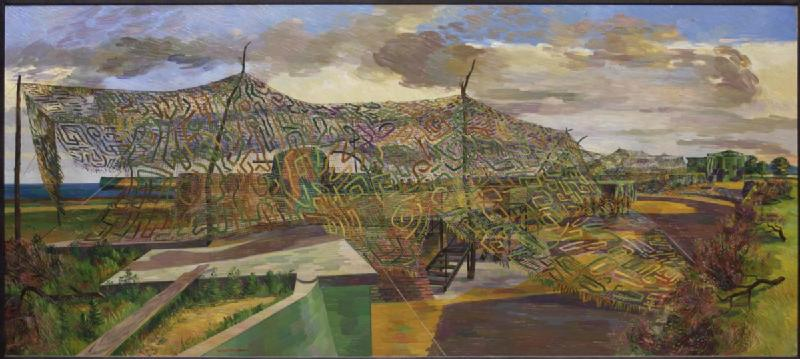
British coastal artillery in September 1940; painting by Barnett Freedman

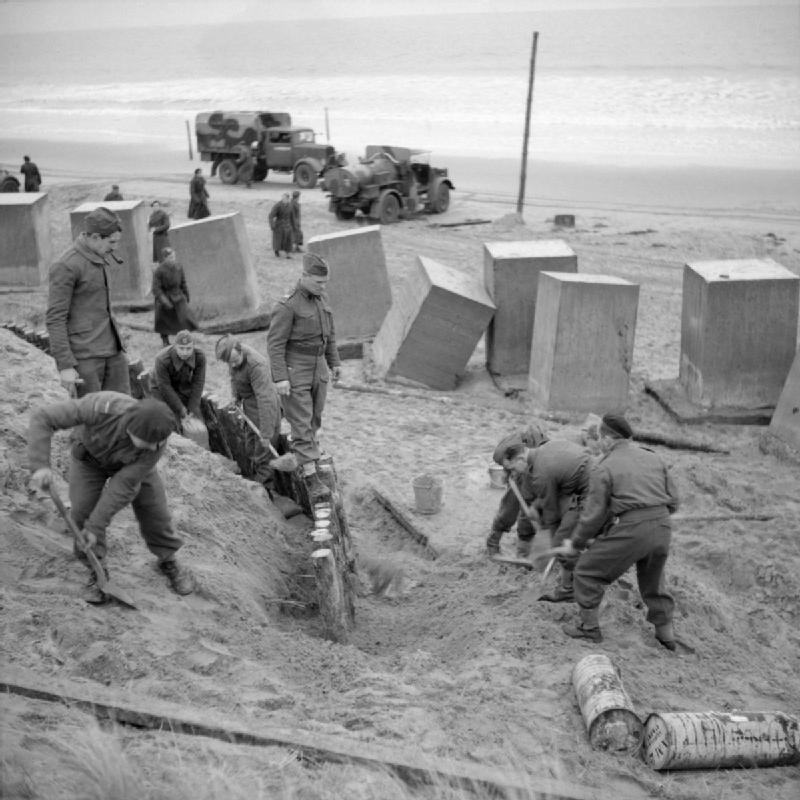
Engineers of the 1st Rifle Brigade (1st Polish Corps) constructing beach defences at Tentsmuir in Scotland. The concrete blocks were used as anti-tank obstacles.

The British engaged upon an extensive program of field fortification. On 27 May 1940 a Home Defence Executive was formed under General Sir Edmund Ironside, Commander-in-Chief, Home Forces, to organise the defence of Britain. At first defence arrangements were largely static and focused on the coastline (the coastal crust) and, in a classic example of defence in depth, on a series of inland anti-tank 'stop' lines. The stop lines were designated command, corps and divisional according to their status and the unit assigned to man them. The longest and most heavily fortified was the General Headquarters anti-tank line, GHQ Line. This was a line of pill boxes and anti-tank trenches that ran from Bristol to the south of London before passing to the east of the capital and running northwards to York. The GHQ line was intended to protect the capital and the industrial heartland of England. Another major line was the Taunton Stop Line, which defended against an advance from England's south-west peninsula. London and other major cities were ringed with inner and outer stop lines.

Military thinking shifted rapidly. Given the lack of equipment and properly trained men, Ironside had little choice but to adopt a strategy of static warfare, but it was soon perceived that this would not be sufficient. Ironside has been criticised for having a siege mentality, but some consider this unfair, as he is believed to have understood the limits of the stop lines and never expected them to hold out indefinitely.

Churchill was not satisfied with Ironside's progress, especially with the creation of a mobile reserve. Anthony Eden, the Secretary of State for War, suggested that Ironside should be replaced by General Alan Brooke (later Viscount Alanbrooke). On 17 July 1940 Churchill spent an afternoon with Brooke during which the general raised concerns about the defence of the country. Two days later Brooke was appointed to replace Ironside. (Note: Churchill's account suggests that the afternoon meeting and Brooke's promotion occurred on the same day, but Brooke's diary entry indicates a two-day delay.)

Brooke's appointment saw a change in focus away from Ironside's stop lines, with cement supplies limited Brooke ordered that its use be prioritised for beach defences and "nodal points". The nodal points, also called anti-tank islands or fortress towns, were focal points of the hedgehog defence and expected to hold out for up to seven days or until relieved.

=== Coastal crust ===
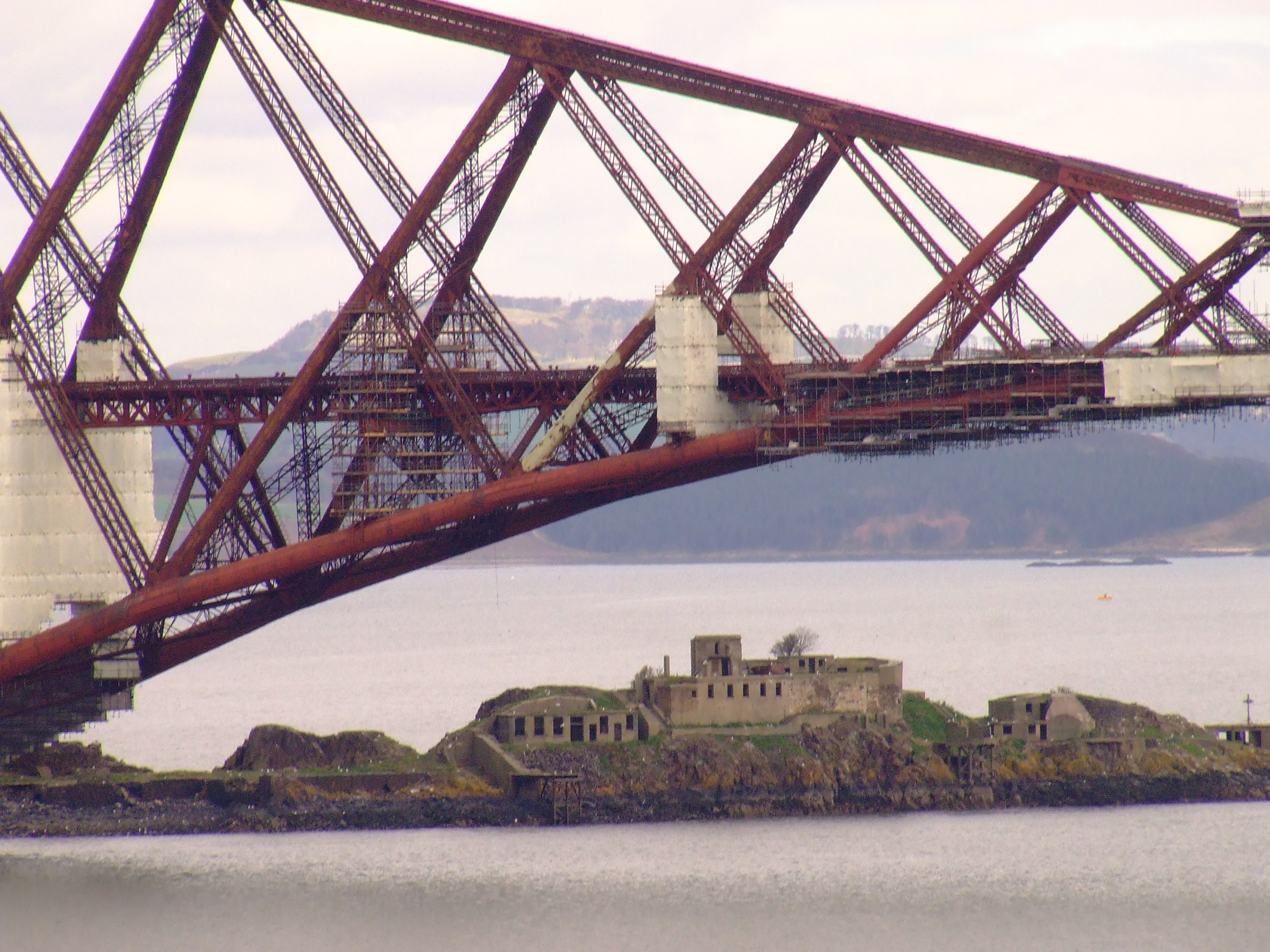
Fortifications on the island of Inchgarvie, just below the Forth Bridge

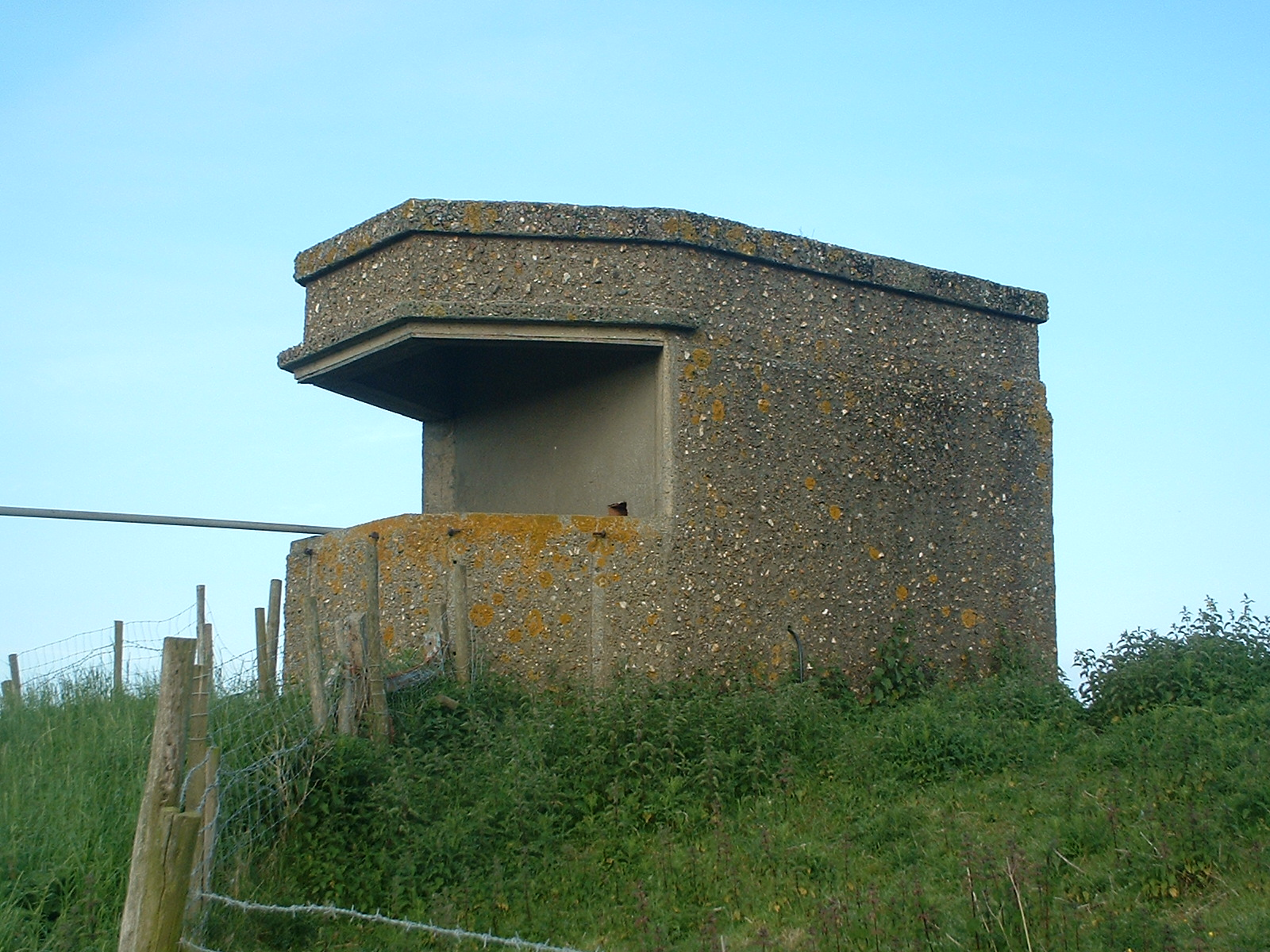
Coastal searchlight emplacement

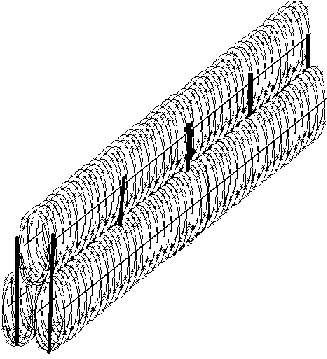
Concertina wire

The areas most vulnerable to an invasion were the south and east coasts of England. In all, a total of 153 Emergency Coastal Batteries were constructed in 1940 in addition to the existing coastal artillery installations, to protect ports and likely landing places. They were fitted with whatever guns were available, which mainly came from naval vessels scrapped since the end of the First World War. These included 6 inch (152 mm), 5.5 inch (140 mm), 4.7 inch (120 mm) and 4 inch (102 mm) guns. Some had little ammunition, sometimes as few as ten rounds apiece. At Dover, two 14 inch (356 mm) guns known as Winnie and Pooh were employed. There were also a few land-based torpedo batteries.

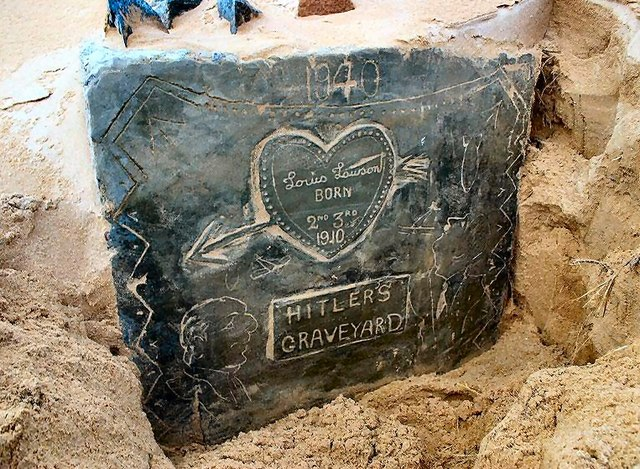
Anti-tank concrete cube on the beach at Newburgh, Fife. It is carved with graffiti, including the words "HITLER'S GRAVEYARD".

Beaches were blocked with entanglements of barbed wire, usually in the form of three coils of concertina wire fixed by metal posts, or a simple fence of straight wires supported on waist-high posts. The wire would also demarcate extensive minefields, with both anti-tank and anti-personnel mines on and behind the beaches. On many of the more remote beaches this combination of wire and mines represented the full extent of the passive defences.

Portions of Romney Marsh, which was the planned invasion site of Operation Sea Lion, were flooded and there were plans to flood more of the Marsh if the invasion were to materialise.

Piers, ideal for landing troops, and situated in large numbers along the south coast of England, were disassembled, blocked or otherwise destroyed. Many piers were not repaired until the late 1940s or early 1950s.

Where a barrier to tanks was required, Admiralty scaffolding (also known as beach scaffolding or obstacle Z.1) was constructed. Essentially a fence of scaffolding tubes 9 feet (2.7 m) high, the scaffolding was placed at low water so tanks could not get a good run at it. Admiralty scaffolding was deployed along hundreds of miles of vulnerable beaches.

The beaches themselves were overlooked by pillboxes of various types. These were sometimes placed low down to get maximum advantage from enfilading fire, whereas others were elevated to resist capture. Searchlights were installed at the coast to illuminate the sea surface and the beaches for artillery fire.

Many small islands and peninsulas were fortified to protect inlets and other strategic targets. In the Firth of Forth in east central Scotland, Inchgarvie was heavily fortified with several gun emplacements, which can still be seen. This provided invaluable defence from seaborne attacks on the Forth Bridge and Rosyth Dockyard, approximately a mile upstream from the bridge. Further out to sea, Inchmickery, 1.6 miles (2.6 km) north of Edinburgh, was similarly fortified. Remnants of gun emplacements on the coast to the north, in North Queensferry, and south, in Dalmeny, of Inchmickery also remain.

=== Lines and islands ===
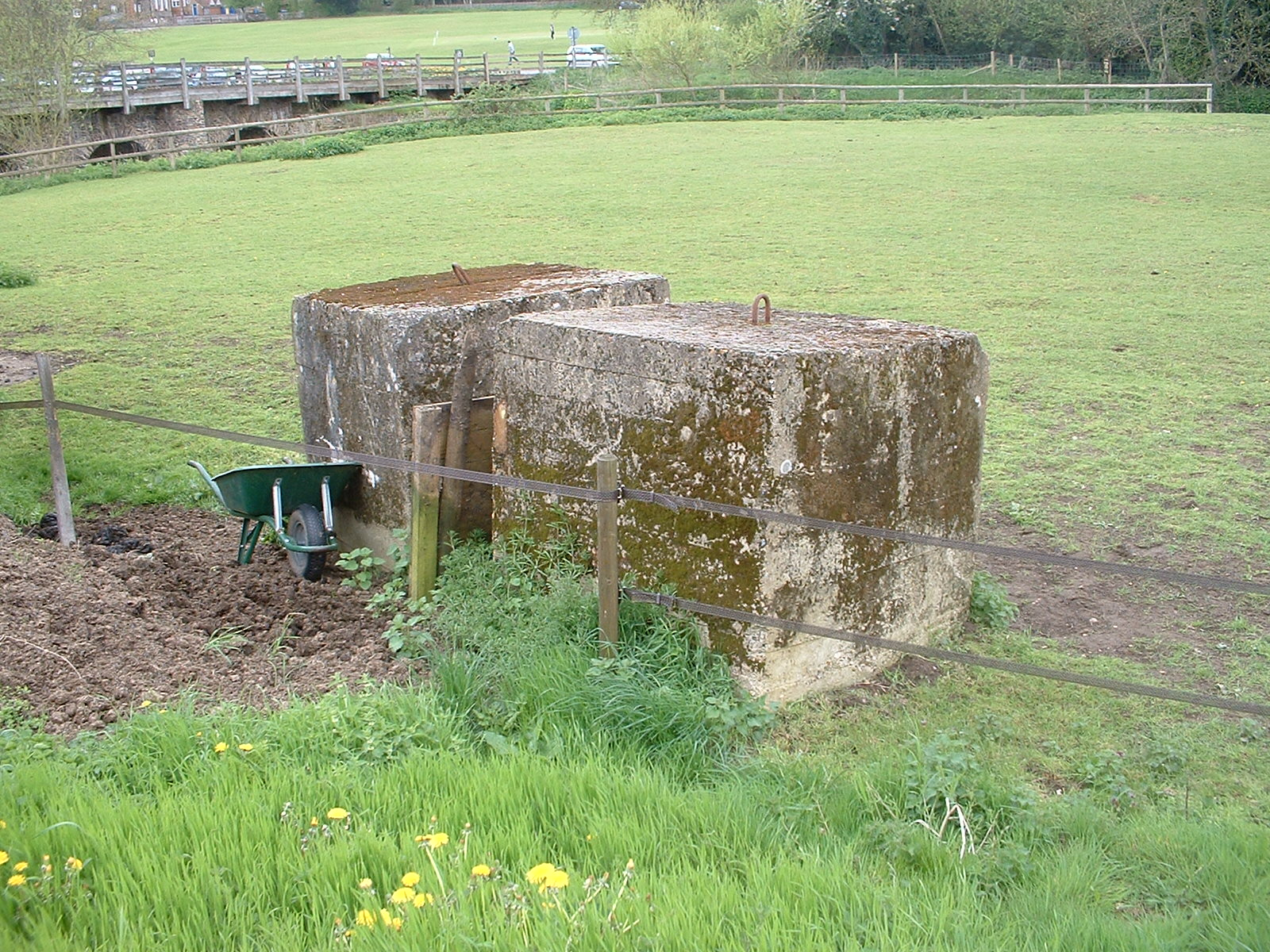
Anti-tank cubes

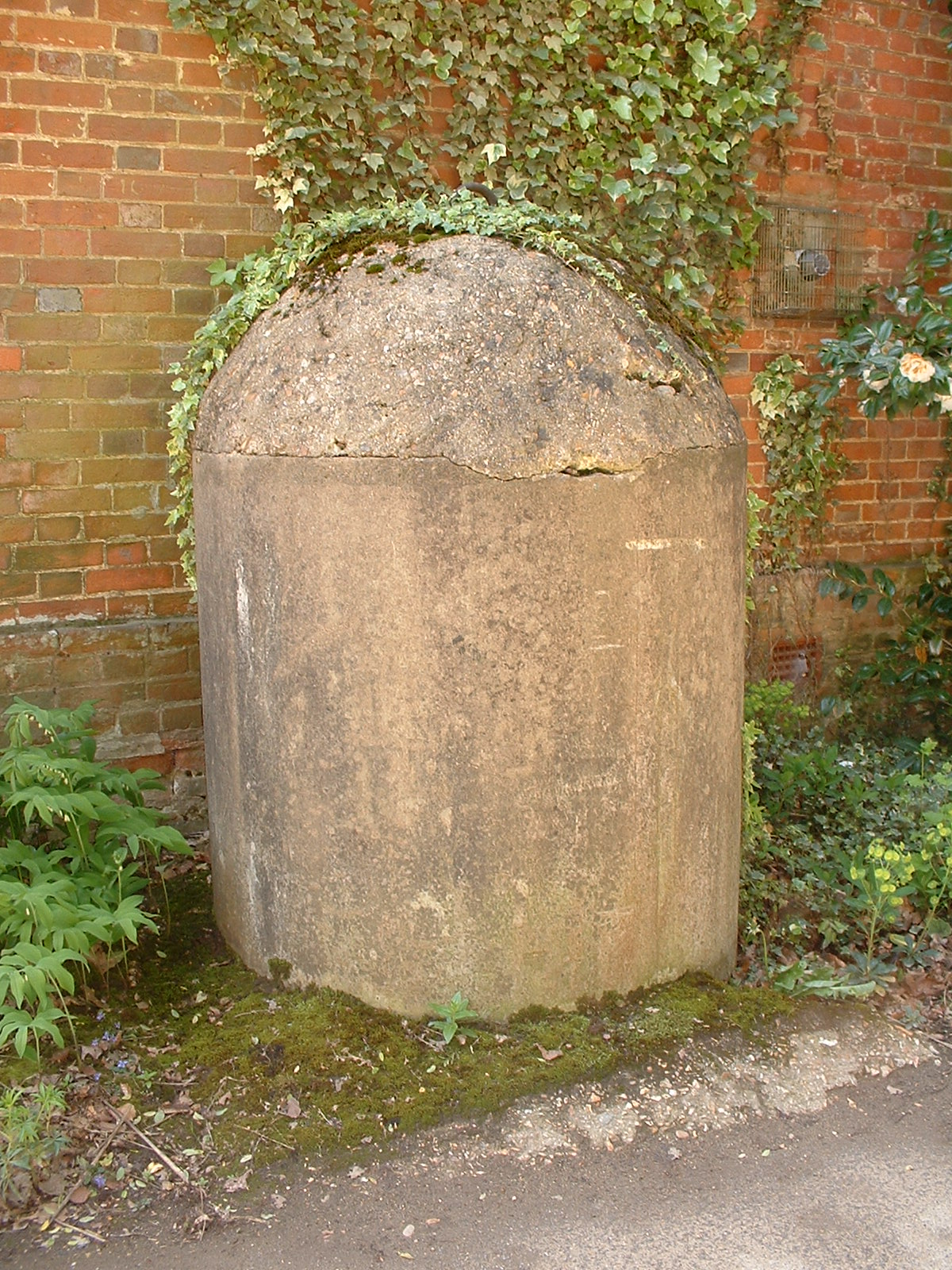
Anti-tank cylinder

The primary purpose of the stop lines and the anti-tank islands that followed was to hold up the enemy, slowing progress and restricting the route of an attack. The need to prevent tanks from breaking through was of key importance. Consequently, the defences generally ran along pre-existing impediments to tanks, such as rivers, canals, railway embankments and cuttings, thick woods and other natural obstacles. Where possible, previously well-drained land was allowed to flood, making the ground too soft to support even tracked vehicles.

Thousands of miles of anti-tank ditches were dug, usually by mechanical excavators, but occasionally by hand. They were typically 18 feet (5.5 m) wide and 11 feet (3.4 m) deep and either trapezoidal or triangular in section, with the defended side being especially steep and revetted with whatever material was available.

Elsewhere, tank barriers were made of massive reinforced concrete obstacles, either cubic, pyramidal or cylindrical. The cubes generally came in two sizes: 5 or 3.5 feet (1.5 or 1.1 m) high. In a few places, anti-tank walls were constructed – essentially continuously abutted cubes.

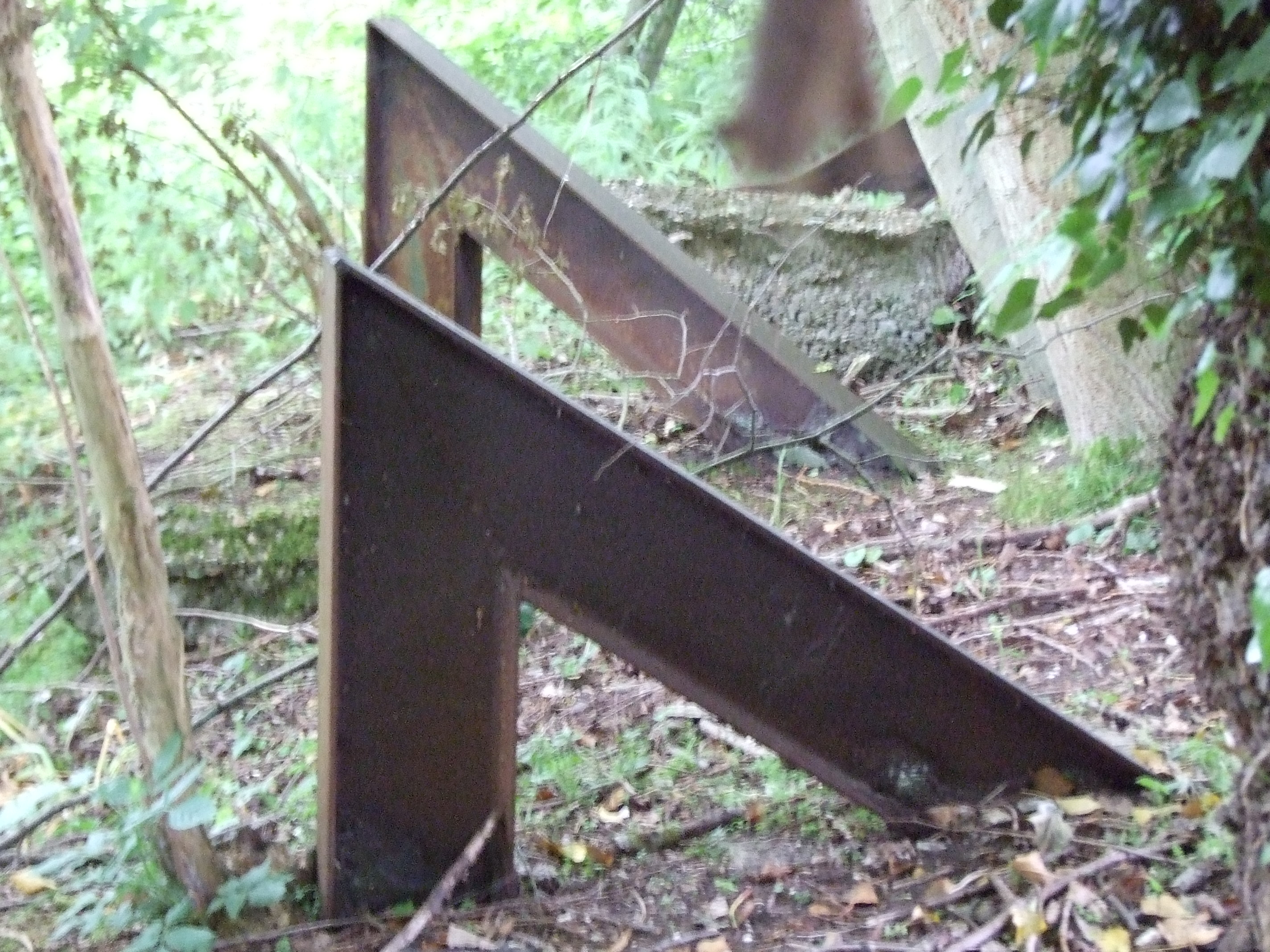
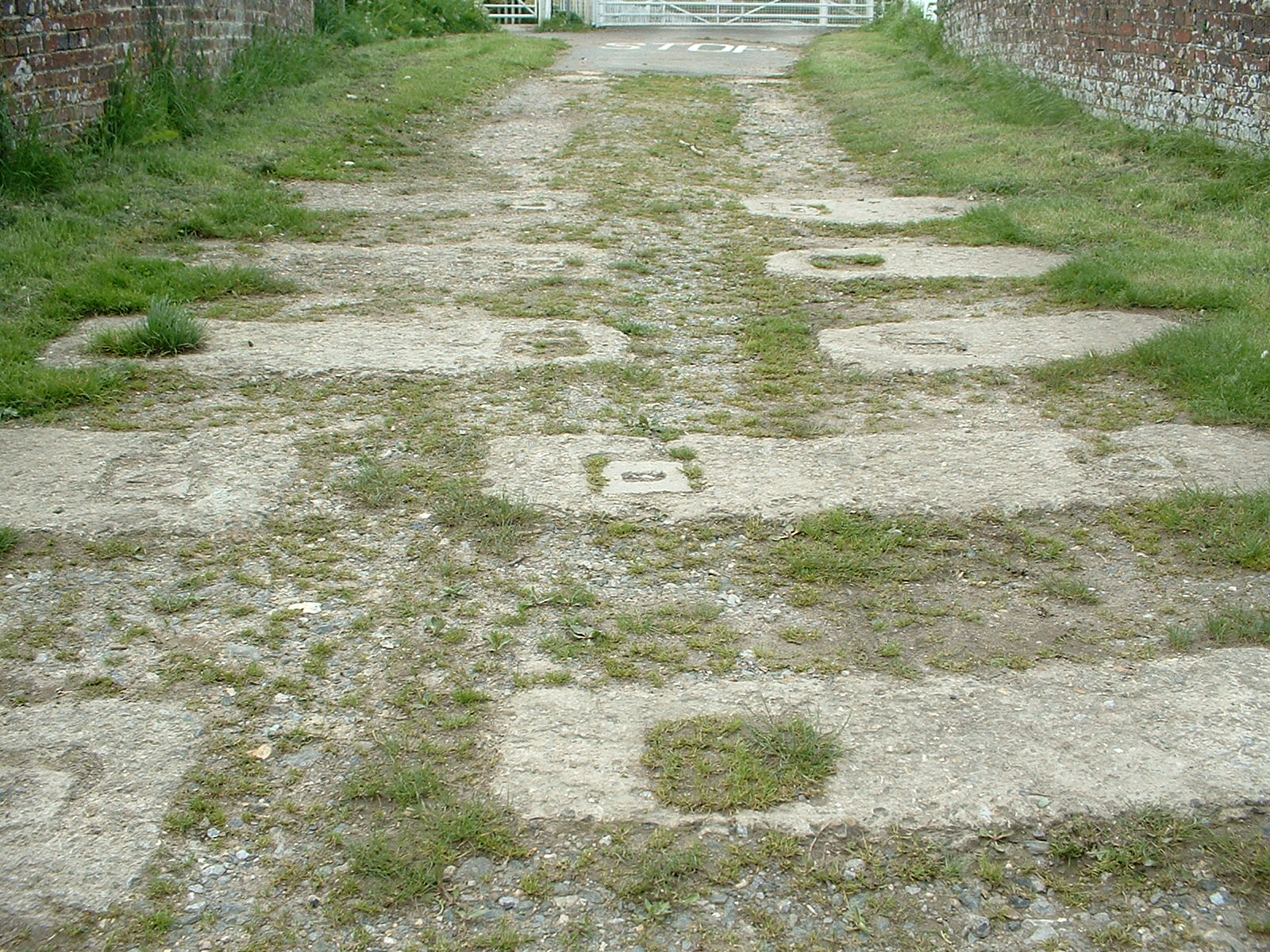
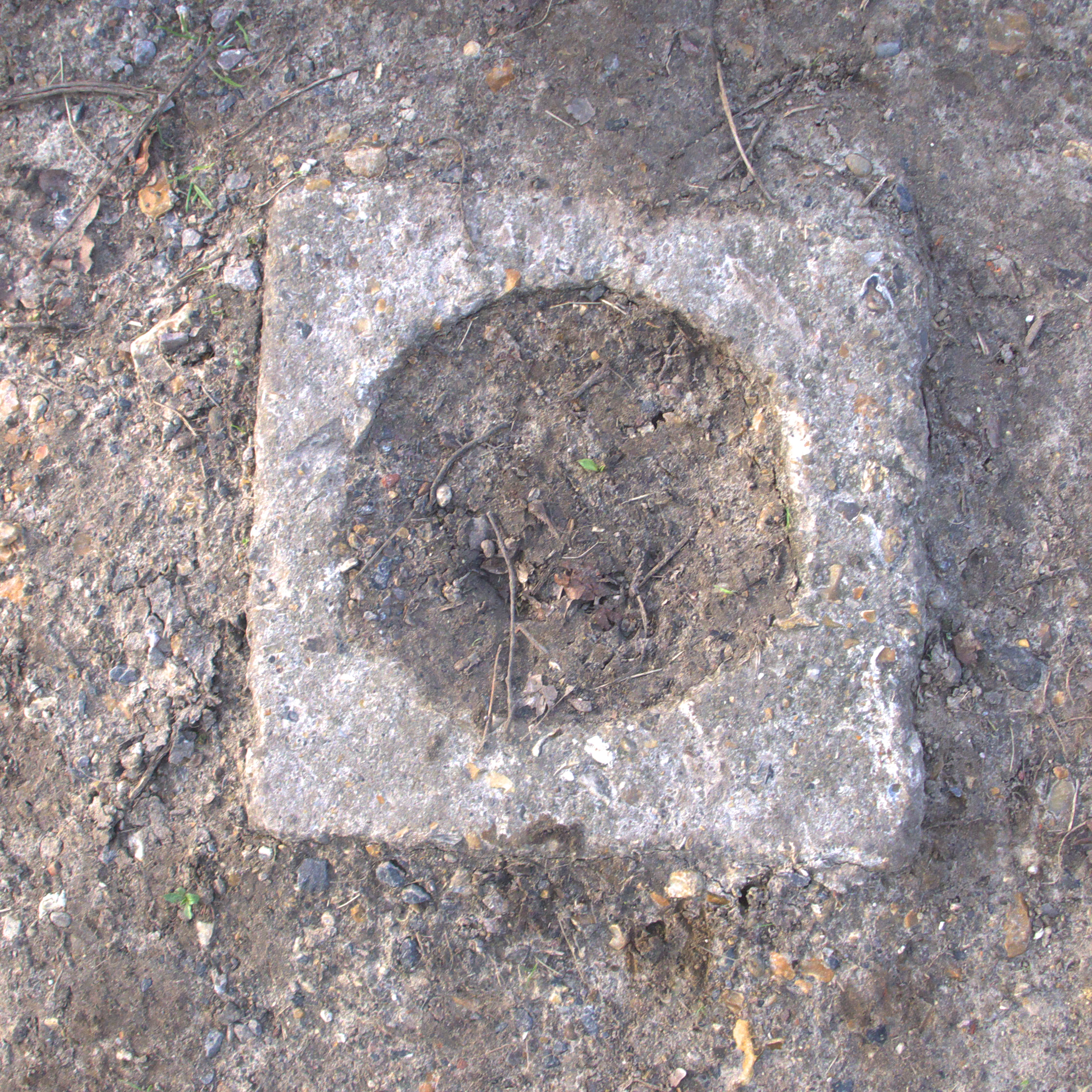
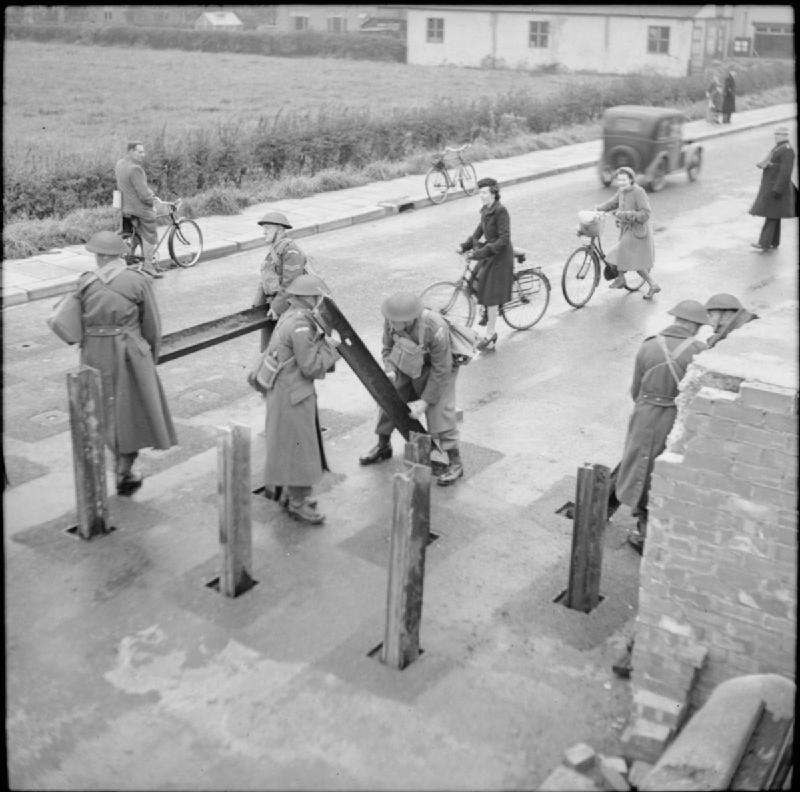
Top left: 'Hair pins' at Narborough, Norfolk. Top right: Sockets for a hedgehog removable roadblock on a bridge over the Kennet and Avon Canal. Bottom left: Sockets for anti-tank mines on a bridge over the Basingstoke Canal. Bottom right: Home Guard soldiers in York prepare a roadblock by inserting metal girders into pre-dug holes in the road, 2 November 1941.

Large cylinders were made from a section of sewer pipe 3 to 4 feet (91 to 122 cm) in diameter filled with concrete typically to a height of 4 to 5 feet (1.2 to 1.5 m), frequently with a dome at the top. Smaller cylinders cast from concrete are also frequently found.

Pimples, popularly known as dragon's teeth, were pyramid-shaped concrete blocks designed specifically to counter tanks which, attempting to pass them, would climb up exposing vulnerable parts of the vehicle and possibly slip down with the tracks between the points. They ranged in size but were typically 2 feet (61 cm) high and about 3 feet (91 cm) square at the base. There was also a conical form.

Cubes, cylinders and pimples were deployed in long rows, often several rows deep, to form tank barriers at beaches and inland. They were also used in smaller numbers to block roads. They frequently sported loops at the top for the attachment of barbed wire. There was also a tetrahedral or caltrop-shaped obstacle, although it seems these were rare.

Where natural tank barriers needed only to be augmented, concrete or wooden posts sufficed.

Roads offered the enemy fast routes to their objectives and consequently were blocked at strategic points. Many of the road-blocks formed by Ironside were semi-permanent. In many cases, Brooke had these removed altogether, as experience had shown they could be as much of an impediment to friends as to foes. Brooke favoured removable blocks.

The simplest of the removable roadblocks consisted of concrete anti-tank cylinders of various sizes but typically about 3 feet (0.91 m) high and 2 feet (61 cm) in diameter; these could be manhandled into position as required. Anti-tank cylinders were to be used on roads, and other hard surfaces; deployed irregularly in five rows with bricks or kerbstones scattered nearby to stop the cylinders moving more than 2 ft (0.61 m). Cylinders were often placed in front of socket roadblocks as an additional obstacle. One common type of removable anti-tank roadblock comprised a pair of massive concrete buttresses permanently installed at the roadside; these buttresses had holes and/or slots to accept horizontal railway lines or rolled steel joists (RSJs). Similar blocks were placed across railway tracks because tanks can move along railway lines almost as easily as they can along roads. These blocks would be placed strategically where it was difficult for a vehicle to go around – tank obstacles and mines being positioned as required – and they could be opened or closed within a matter of minutes.

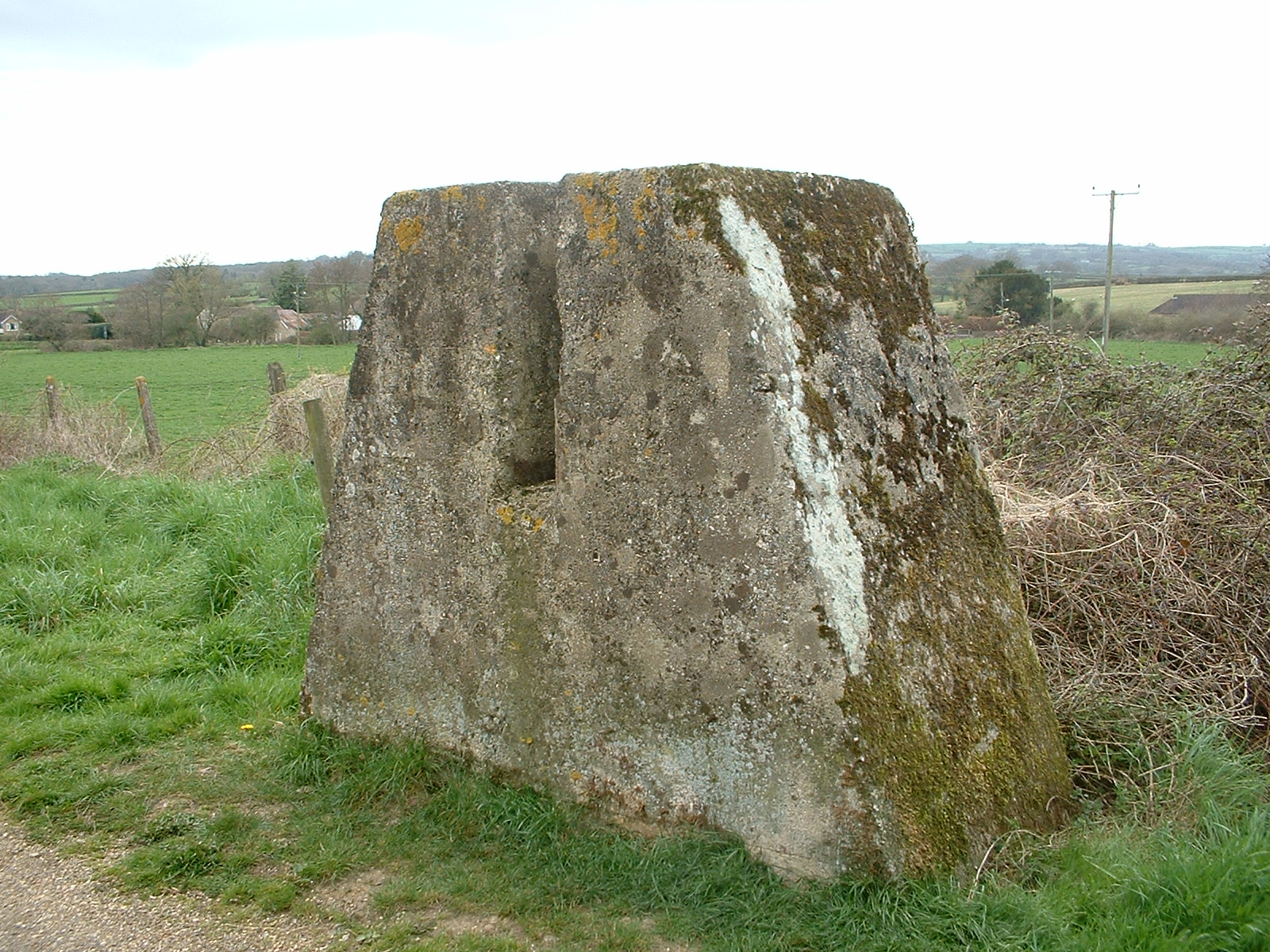
Removable roadblock buttress on the Taunton Stop Line

There were two types of socket roadblocks. The first comprised vertical lengths of railway line placed in sockets in the road and was known as hedgehogs. The second type comprised railway lines or RSJs bent or welded at around a 60° angle, known as hairpins. In both cases, prepared sockets about 6 inches (152.40 mm) square were placed in the road, closed by covers when not in use, allowing traffic to pass normally.

Another removable roadblocking system used mines. The extant remains of such systems superficially resemble those of hedgehog or hairpin, but the pits are shallow: just deep enough to take an anti-tank mine. When not in use the sockets were filled with wooden plugs, allowing traffic to pass normally.

Bridges and other key points were prepared for demolition at short notice by preparing chambers filled with explosives. A Depth Charge Crater was a site in a road (usually at a junction) prepared with buried explosives that could be detonated to instantly form a deep crater as a tank obstacle. The Canadian pipe mine (later known as the McNaughton Tube after General Andrew McNaughton) was a horizontally bored pipe packed with explosives – once in place this could be used to instantly ruin a road or runway. Prepared demolitions had the advantage of being undetectable from the air – the enemy could not take any precautions against them, or plot a route of attack around them.

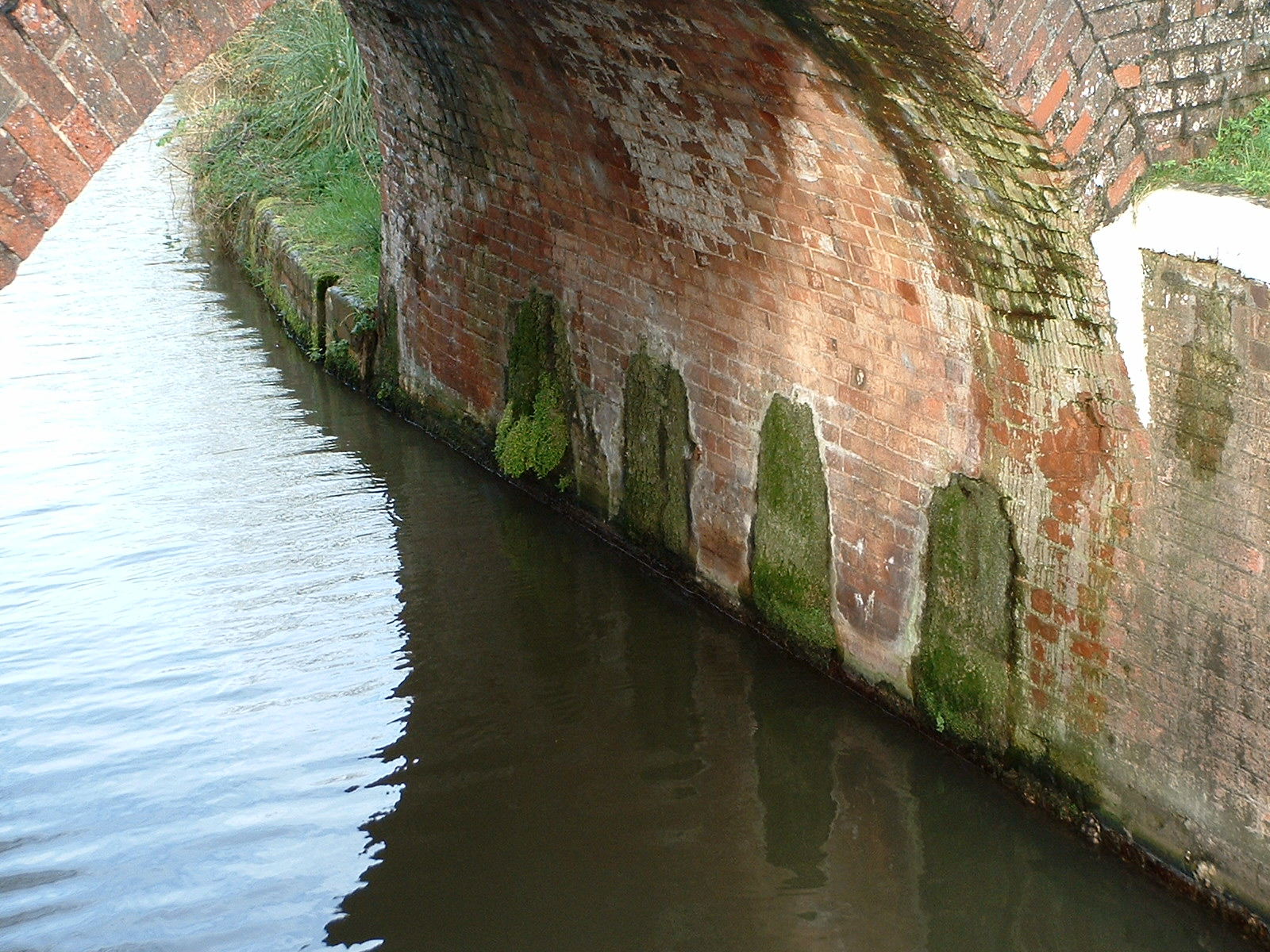
Demolition chambers under a bridge over the Bridgwater and Taunton Canal – later filled with concrete

Crossing points in the defence network – bridges, tunnels and other weak spots – were called nodes or points of resistance. These were fortified with removable road blocks, barbed wire entanglements and land mines. These passive defences were overlooked by trench works, gun and mortar emplacements, and pillboxes. In places, entire villages were fortified using barriers of Admiralty scaffolding, sandbagged positions and loopholes in existing buildings.

Nodes were designated 'A', 'B' or 'C' depending upon how long they were expected to hold out. Home Guard troops were largely responsible for the defence of nodal points and other centres of resistance, such as towns and defended villages. Category 'A' nodal points and anti-tank islands were usually garrisoned by regular troops.

The rate of construction was frenetic: by the end of September 1940, 18,000 pillboxes and numerous other preparations had been completed. Some existing defences such as mediaeval castles and Napoleonic forts were augmented with modern additions such as dragon's teeth and pillboxes; some Iron Age forts housed anti-aircraft and observer positions. About 28,000 pillboxes and other hardened field fortifications were constructed in the United Kingdom of which about 6,500 still survive. Some defences were disguised and examples are known of pillboxes constructed to resemble haystacks, logpiles and innocuous buildings such as churches and railway stations.

=== Airfields and open areas ===
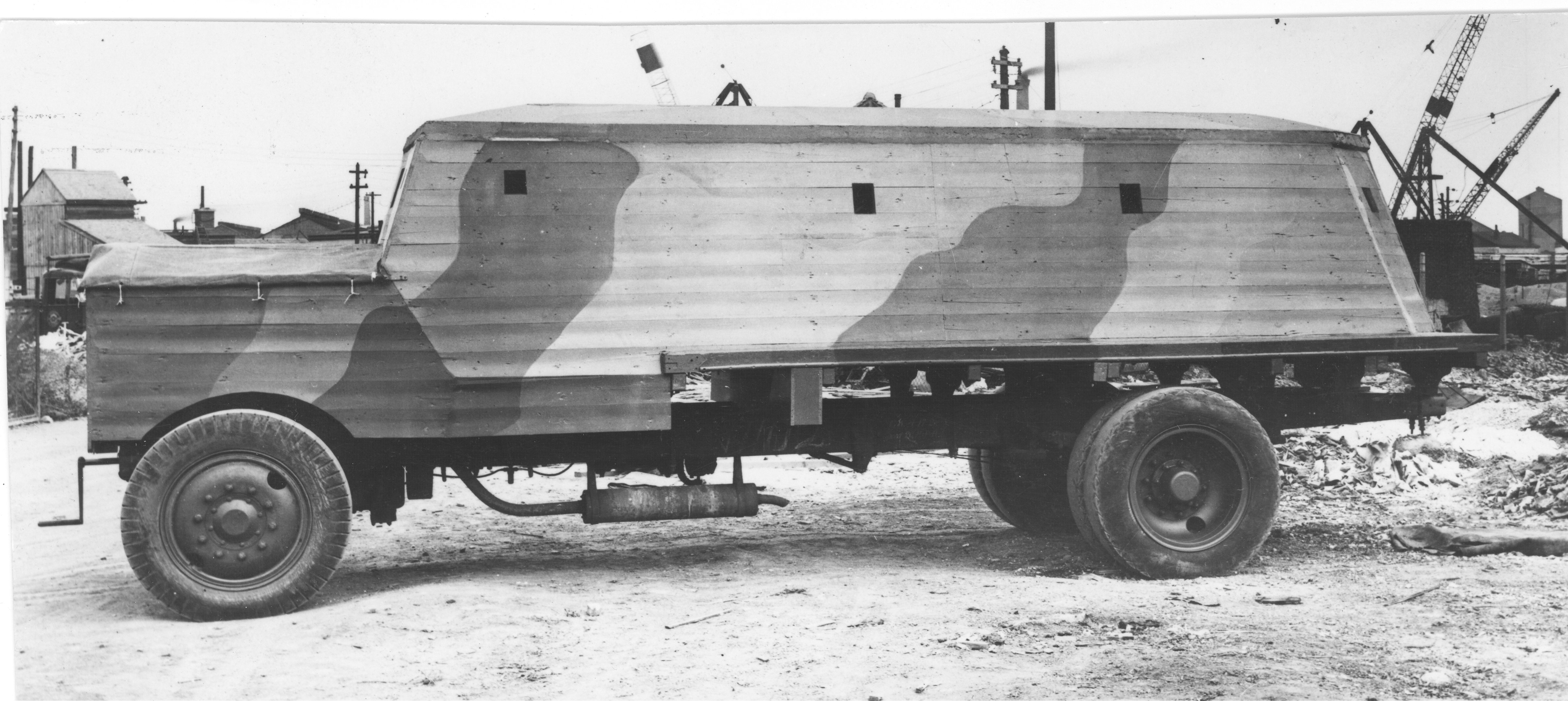
Bison concrete armoured lorry

Open areas were considered vulnerable to invasion from the air: a landing by paratroops, glider-borne troops or powered aircraft which could land and take off again. Open areas with a straight length of 500 yards (460 m) or more within five miles (8 km) of the coast or an airfield were considered vulnerable. These were blocked by trenches or, more usually, by wooden or concrete obstacles, as well as old cars.

Securing an airstrip would be an important objective for the invader. Airfields, considered extremely vulnerable, were protected by trench works and pillboxes that faced inwards towards the runway, rather than outwards. Many of these fortifications were specified by the Air Ministry and defensive designs were unique to airfields – these would not be expected to face heavy weapons so the degree of protection was less and there was more emphasis on all-round visibility and sweeping fields of fire. It was difficult to defend large open areas without creating impediments to the movement of friendly aircraft. Solutions to this problem included the pop-up Picket Hamilton fort – a light pillbox that could be lowered to ground level when the airfield was in use.

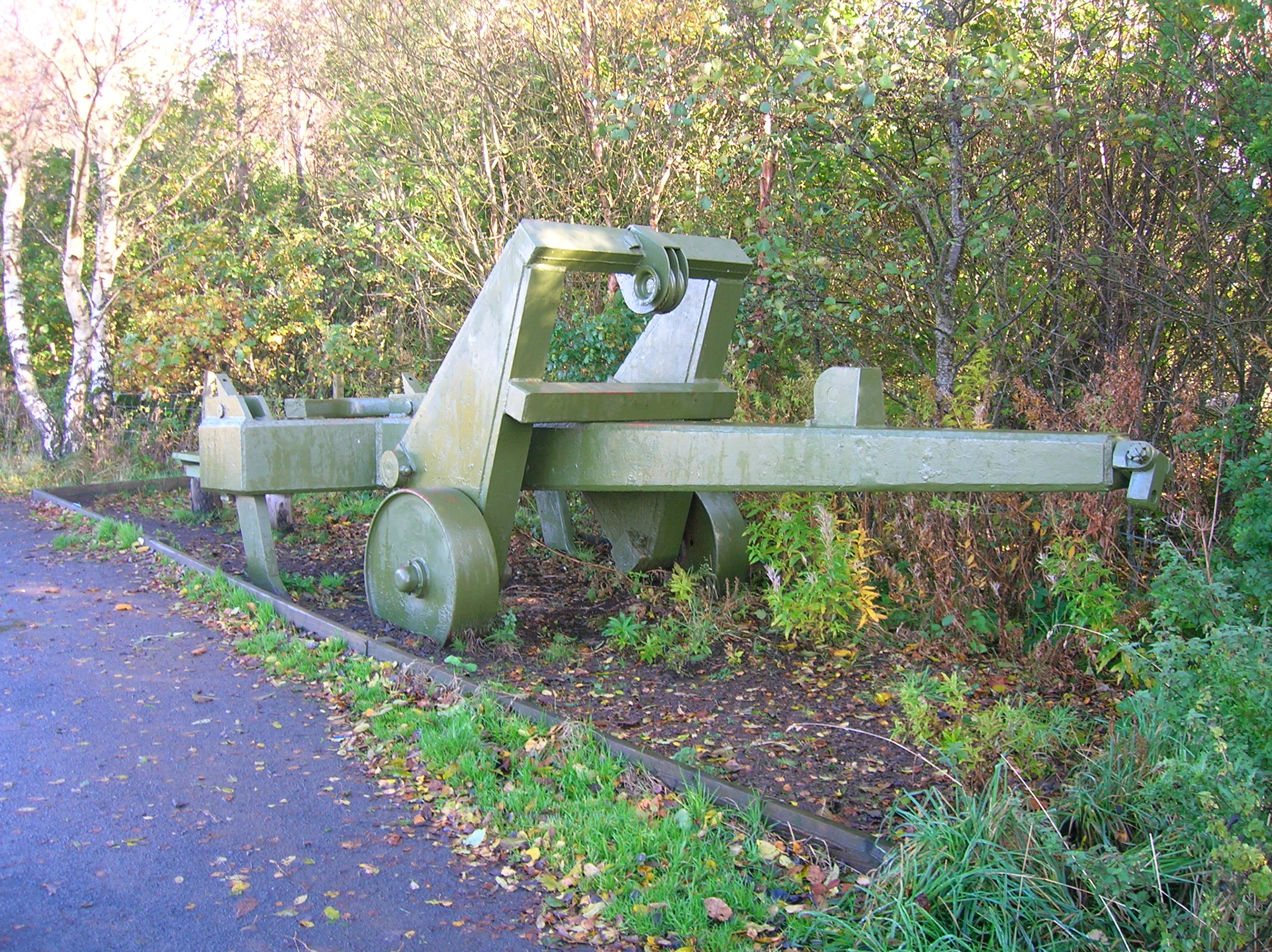
The Canadian runway 'plough'

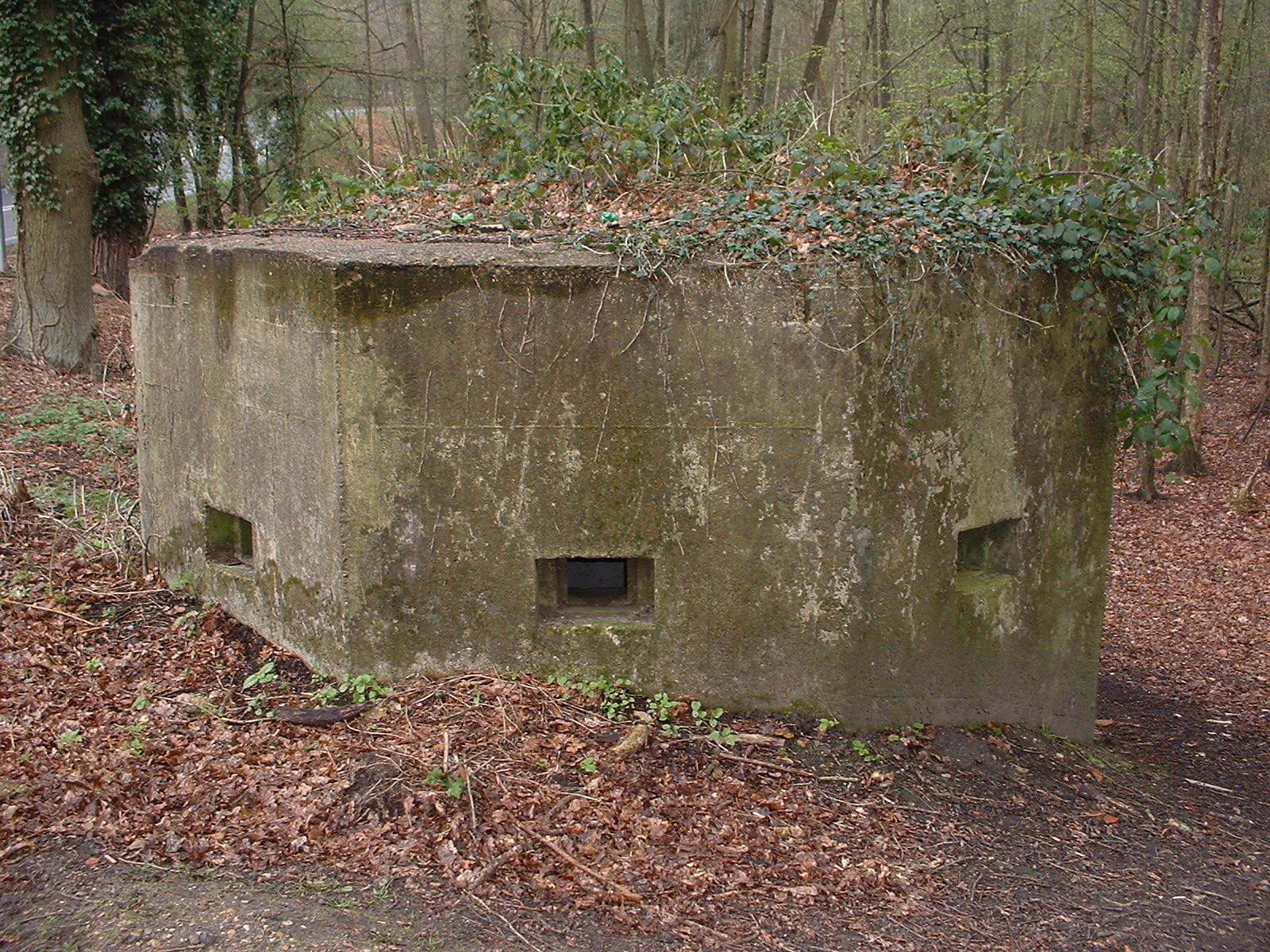
Pillbox type FW3/22

Another innovation was a mobile pillbox that could be driven out onto the airfield. This was known as the Bison and consisted of a lorry with a concrete armoured cabin and a small concrete pillbox on the flat bed. Constructed in Canada, a 'runway plough', assembled in Scotland, survives at Eglinton Country Park. It was purchased by the army in World War II to rip up aerodrome runways and railway lines, making them useless to the occupying forces, if an invasion took place. It was used at the old Eglinton Estate, which had been commandeered by the army, to provide its army operators with the necessary experience. It was hauled by a powerful Foden Trucks tractor, possibly via a pulley and cable system.

== Other defensive measures ==
Other basic defensive measures included the removal of signposts, milestones (some had the carved details obscured with cement) and railway station signs, making it more likely that an enemy would become confused. Petrol pumps were removed from service stations near the coast and there were careful preparations for the destruction of those that were left. Detailed plans were made for destroying anything that might prove useful to the invader such as port facilities, key roads and rolling stock. In certain areas, non-essential citizens were evacuated. In the county of Kent, 40% of the population was relocated; in East Anglia, the figure was 50%.

Perhaps most importantly, the population was told what was expected from them. In June 1940, the Ministry of Information published If the Invader Comes, what to do – and how to do it. It began:

The Germans threaten to invade Great Britain. If they do so they will be driven out by our Navy, our Army and our Air Force. Yet the ordinary men and women of the civilian population will also have their part to play. Hitler's invasions of Poland, Holland and Belgium were greatly helped by the fact that the civilian population was taken by surprise. They did not know what to do when the moment came. You must not be taken by surprise. This leaflet tells you what general line you should take. More detailed instructions will be given you when the danger comes nearer. Meanwhile, read these instructions carefully and be prepared to carry them out. [Emphasis as in original].

The first instruction given quite emphatically is that, unless ordered to evacuate, "the order ...[was]... to 'stay put'". The roads were not to be blocked by refugees. Further warnings were given not to believe rumours and not to spread them, to be distrustful of orders that might be faked and even to check that an officer giving orders really was British. Further: Britons were advised to keep calm and report anything suspicious quickly and accurately; deny useful things to the enemy such as food, fuel, maps or transport; be ready to block roads – when ordered to do so – "by felling trees, wiring them together or blocking the roads with cars"; to organise resistance at shops and factories; and, finally: "Think before you act. But think always of your country before you think of yourself".

On 13 June 1940, the ringing of church bells was banned; henceforth, they would only be rung by the military or the police to warn that an invasion – generally meaning by parachutists – was in progress.

More than passive resistance was expected – or at least hoped for – from the population. Churchill considered the formation of a Home Guard Reserve, given only an armband and basic training on the use of simple weapons, such as Molotov cocktails. The reserve would only have been expected to report for duty in an invasion. Later, Churchill wrote how he envisaged the use of the sticky bomb, "We had the picture in mind that devoted soldiers or civilians would run close up to the tank and even thrust the bomb upon it, though its explosion cost them their lives [Italics added for emphasis]." The prime minister practised shooting, and told wife Clementine and daughter in law Pamela that he expected them each to kill one or two Germans. When Pamela protested that she did not know how to use a gun, Churchill told her to use a kitchen butcher knife as "You can always take a Hun with you". He later recorded how he intended to use the slogan "You can always take one with you."

In 1941, in towns and villages, invasion committees were formed to cooperate with the military and plan for the worst should their communities be isolated or occupied. The members of committees typically included representatives of the local council, the Air Raid Precautions service, the fire service, the police, the Women's Voluntary Service and the Home Guard, as well as officers for medicine, sanitation and food. The plans of these committees were kept in secret War Books, although few remain. Detailed inventories of anything useful were kept: vehicles, animals and basic tools, and lists were made of contact details for key personnel. Plans were made for a wide range of emergencies, including improvised mortuaries and places to bury the dead. Instructions to the invasion committees stated: "... every citizen will regard it as his duty to hinder and frustrate the enemy and help our own forces by every means that ingenuity can devise and common sense suggest."

At the outbreak of the war there were around 60,000 police officers in the United Kingdom, including some 20,000 in London's Metropolitan Police. Many younger officers joined the armed forces and numbers were maintained by recruiting "war reserve" officers, special constables and by recalling retired officers. As well as their usual duties the police, who are a generally unarmed force in Britain, took on roles checking for enemy agents and arresting deserters.

On the same day as the Battle of Dunkirk, Scotland Yard issued a memorandum detailing the police use of firearms in wartime. This detailed the planned training for all officers in the use of pistols and revolvers, as it was decided that even though the police were non-combatant, they would provide armed guards at sites deemed a risk from enemy sabotage, and defend their own police stations from enemy attack. A supplementary secret memorandum of 29 May also required the police to carry out armed motorised patrols of 2–4 men, if invasion happened, though it noted the police were a non-combatant force and should primarily be carrying out law enforcement duties. These arrangements led to high level political discussions; on 1 August 1940 Lord Mottisone, a former cabinet minister, telephoned Churchill to advise that current police regulations would require officers to prevent British civilians resisting the German forces in occupied areas. Churchill considered this unacceptable and he wrote to the home secretary, John Anderson, and Lord Privy Seal, Clement Attlee, asking for the regulations to be amended. Churchill wanted the police, ARP wardens and firemen to remain until the last troops withdrew from an area and suggested that such organisations might automatically become part of the military in case of invasion. The War Cabinet discussed the matter and on 12 August Churchill wrote again to the home secretary stating that the police and ARP wardens should be divided into two arms, combatant and non-combatant. The combatant portion would be armed and expected to fight alongside the Home Guard and regular forces and would withdraw with them as necessary. The non-combatant portion would remain in place under enemy occupation, but under orders not to assist the enemy in any way even to maintain order. These instructions were issued to the police by a memorandum from Anderson on 7 September, which stipulated that the non-combatant portion should be a minority and, where possible, made up of older men and those with families.

Because of the additional armed duties the number of firearms allocated to the police was increased. On 1 June 1940 the Metropolitan Police received 3,500 Canadian Ross Rifles of First World War vintage. A further 50 were issued to the London Fire Brigade and 100 to the Port of London Authority Police. Some 73,000 rounds of .303 rifle ammunition were issued, together with tens of thousands of .22 rounds for small bore rifle and pistol training. By 1941 an additional 2,000 automatic pistols and 21,000 American lend-lease revolvers had been issued to the Metropolitan Police; from March 1942 all officers above the rank of inspector were routinely armed with .45 revolvers and twelve rounds of ammunition.

== Guns, petroleum and poison ==
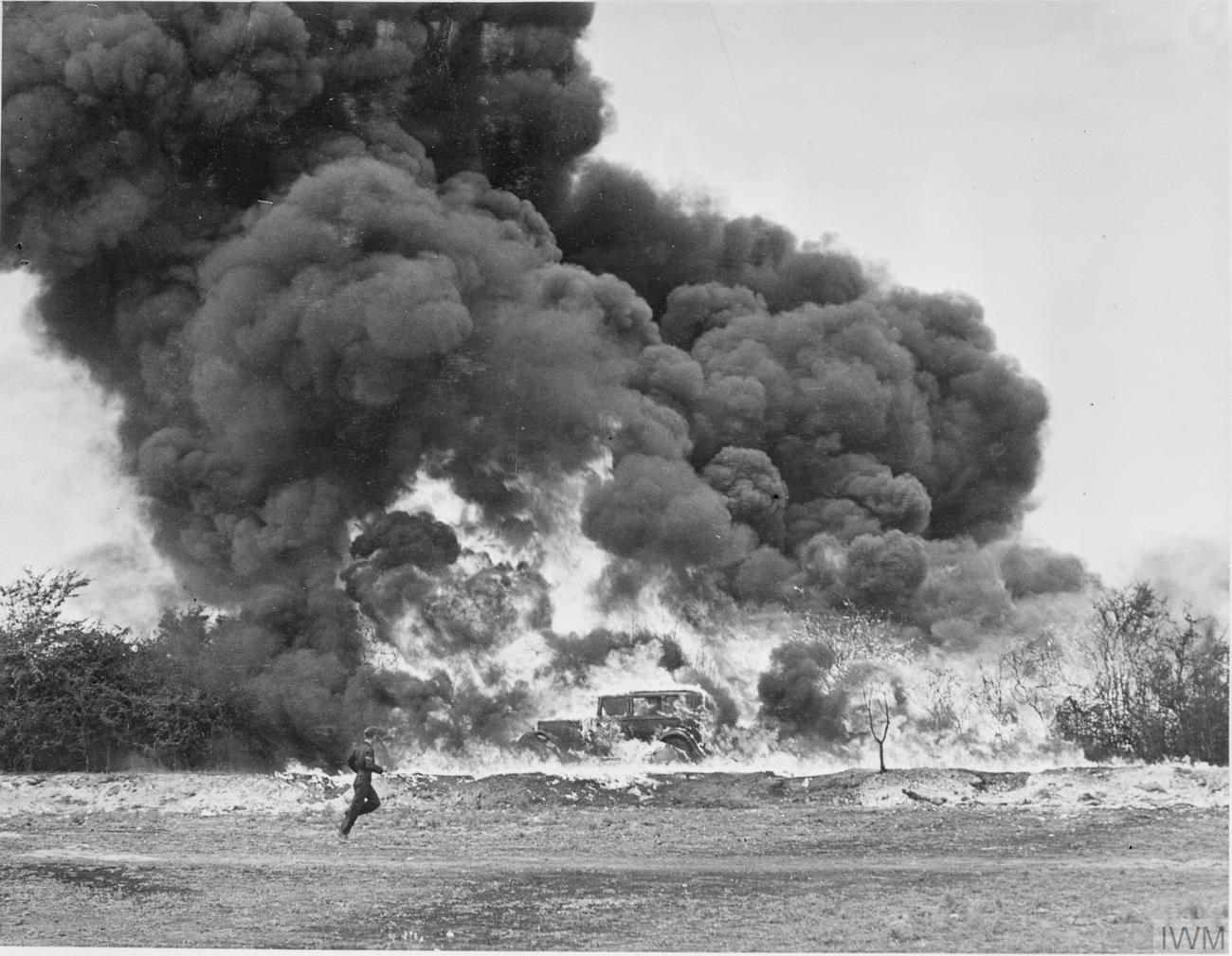
A flame fougasse demonstration somewhere in Britain. A car is surrounded in flames and a huge cloud of smoke c. 1940.

In 1940, weapons were critically short; there was a particular scarcity of anti-tank weapons, many of which had been left in France. Ironside had only 170 2-pounder anti-tank guns but these were supplemented by 100 Hotchkiss 6-pounder guns dating from the First World War, improvised into the anti-tank role by the provision of solid shot. By the end of July 1940, an additional nine hundred 75 mm field guns had been received from the US – the British were desperate for any means of stopping armoured vehicles. The Sten submachine gun was developed following the fall of France, to supplement the limited number of Thompson submachine guns obtained from the United States.

One of the few resources not in short supply was petroleum oil; supplies intended for Europe were filling British storage facilities. Considerable effort and enthusiasm was put into making use of petroleum products as a weapon of war. The Army had not had flame-throwers since the First World War, but a significant number were improvised from pressure greasing equipment acquired from automotive repair garages. Although limited in range, they were reasonably effective.

A mobile flame trap comprised surplus bulk storage tanks on trucks, the contents of which could be hosed into a sunken road and ignited. A static flame trap was prepared with perforated pipes running down the side of a road connected to a 600-imperial-gallon (2,730 L; 720 US gal) elevated tank; some 200 of these traps were installed. Usually, gravity sufficed but in a few cases a pump assisted in spraying the mixture of oil and petrol.

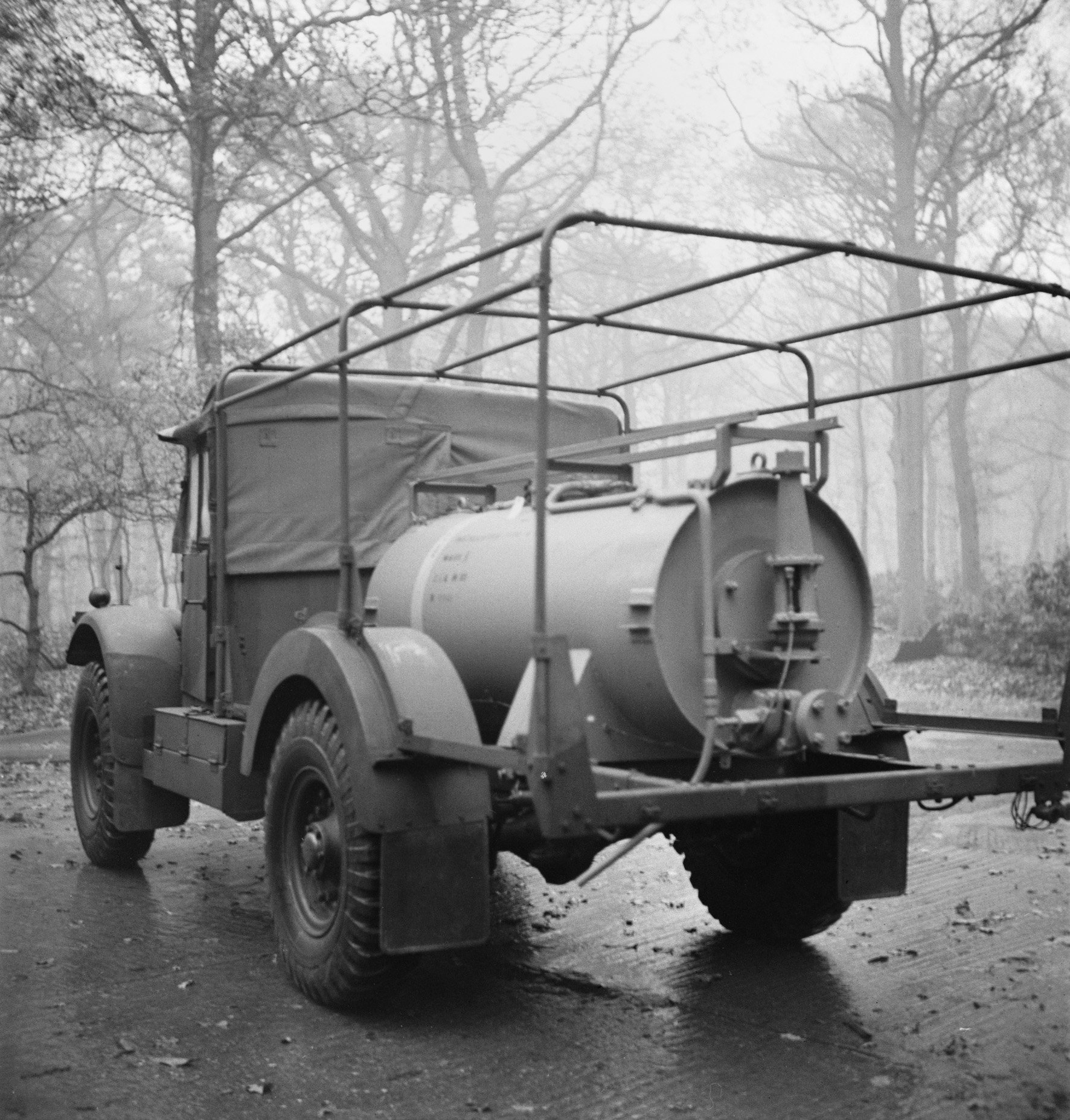
Chemical warfare bulk contamination vehicle c. 1940

A flame fougasse comprised a 40-gallon light steel drum (Note: Although the standard capacity is 44 imperial gallons (55 US gallons), historical records generally refer to 40-gallon drums and sometimes 50-gallon drums apparently interchangeably.) filled with petroleum mixture and a small, electrically detonated explosive. This was dug into the roadside with a substantial overburden and camouflaged. Ammonal provided the propellant charge, it was placed behind the barrel and, when triggered, caused the barrel to rupture and shoot a jet of flame 10 feet (3.0 m) wide and 30 yards (27 m) long. They were usually deployed in batteries of four barrels and would be placed at a location such as a corner, steep incline or roadblock where vehicles would be obliged to slow.

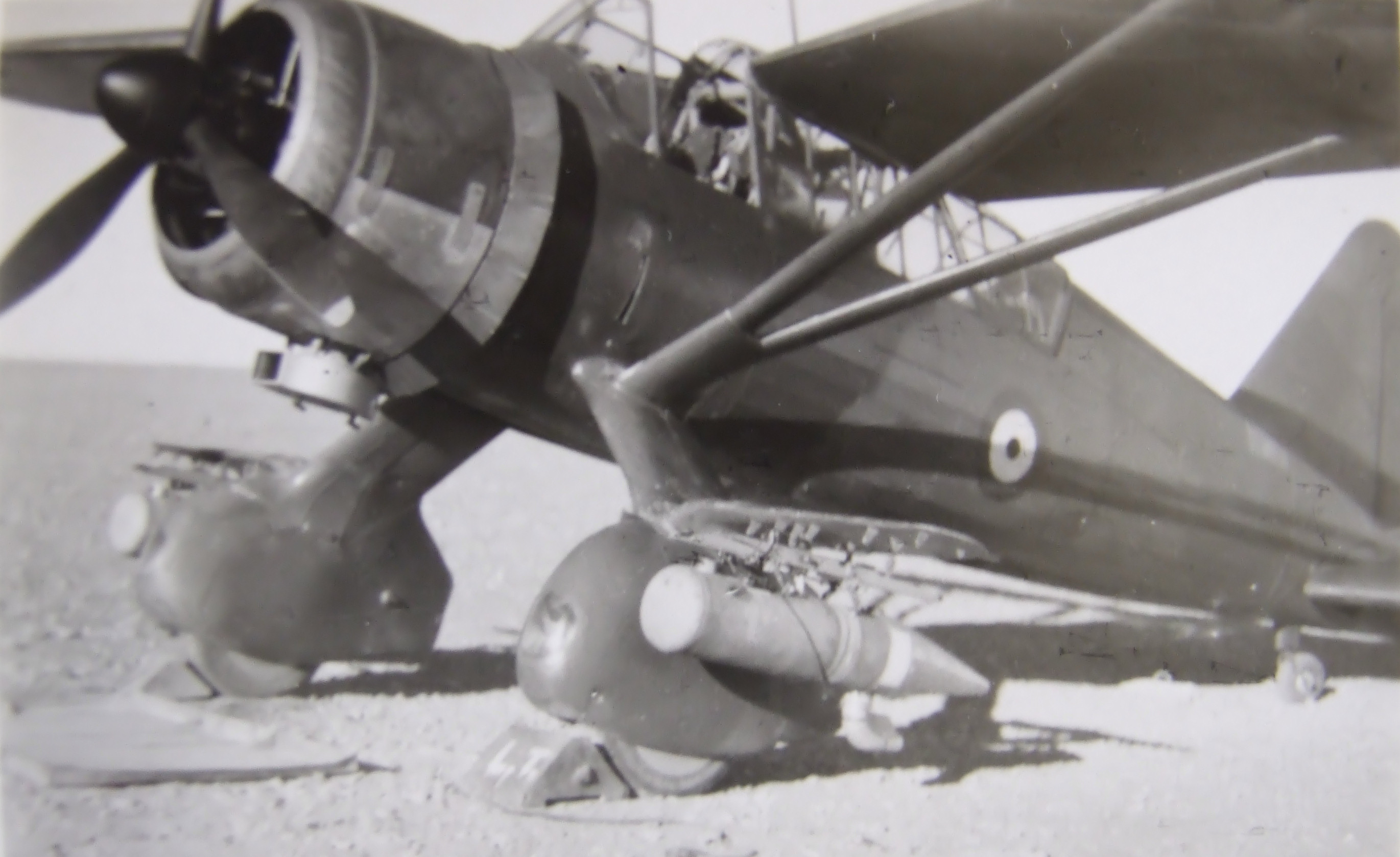
Westland Lysander aircraft prepared for gas spraying c. 1940

Variants of the flame fougasse included the demigasse, a barrel on its side and left in the open with explosive buried underneath; and the hedge hopper: a barrel on end with explosive buried underneath a few inches deep and slightly off centre. On firing, the hedge hopper barrel was projected ten feet (3.0 m) into the air and over a hedge or wall behind which it had been hidden. 50,000 flame fougasse barrels were installed at 7,000 sites mostly in southern England and at a further 2,000 sites in Scotland.

Early experiments with floating petroleum on the sea and igniting it were not entirely successful: the fuel was difficult to ignite, large quantities were required to cover even modest areas and the weapon was easily disrupted by waves. However, the potential was clear. By early 1941, a flame barrage technique was developed. Rather than attempting to ignite oil floating on water, nozzles were placed above high-water mark with pumps producing sufficient pressure to spray fuel, which produced a roaring wall of flame over, rather than on, the water. Such installations consumed considerable resources and although this weapon was impressive, its network of pipes was vulnerable to pre-landing bombardment; General Brooke did not consider it effective. Initially ambitious plans were cut back to cover just a few miles of beaches. The tests of some of these installations were observed by German aircraft; the British capitalised on this by dropping propaganda leaflets into occupied Europe referring to the effects of the petroleum weapons.

It seems likely the British would have used poison gas against troops on beaches. General Brooke, in an annotation to his published war diaries, stated that he "... had every intention of using sprayed mustard gas on the beaches". Mustard gas was manufactured as well as chlorine, phosgene and Paris Green. Poison gases were stored at key points for use by Bomber Command and in smaller quantities at many more airfields for use against the beaches. Bombers and crop sprayers would spray landing craft and beaches with mustard gas and Paris Green.

== Deception and disinformation ==
In addition to hiding real weapons and fortifications, steps were taken to create the impression of the existence of defences that were not real. Drain pipes stood in place of real guns, dummy pillboxes were constructed, and uniformed mannequins kept an unblinking vigil.

Volunteers were encouraged to use anything that would delay the enemy. A young member of the Home Guard (LDV) recalled:

In the villages use was made of any existing walls or buildings, loopholes for firing or passing heavy chains and cables through to form barriers strong enough to slow down or stop soft skinned vehicles. The chains and cables could also be made into psychological barriers to tanks by attaching an imitation bomb to them, an impression which could be augmented by running a length of cable from it to a position out of sight of a tank commander. These positions could be made even more authentic by breaking up the surface immediately in front of the obstacle and burying an old soup plate, or similar object. For occasions where time did not permit the passing of cables and chains we had concrete cylinders the size of a 45 gallon oil or tar barrel ready to roll into a roadway or other gap. These generally had a large metal loop cemented into one end through which a cable could be passed to link several together. Again, suspicious looking parcels could be attached to strengthen the illusion.

In 1938, a section funded by MI6 was created for propaganda, headed by Sir Campbell Stuart. It was allocated premises at Electra House and was dubbed Department EH. On 25 September 1939, the unit was mobilised to Woburn Abbey where it joined a subversion team from MI6, known as Section D, and by July these teams became a part of the newly created Special Operations Executive (SOE). These SOE elements went on to form the core of the Political Warfare Executive in 1941. Their task was to spread false rumours and conduct psychological warfare. Inspired by a demonstration of petroleum warfare, one false rumour stated that the British had a new bomb: dropped from an aircraft, it caused a thin film of volatile liquid to spread over the surface of the water which it then ignited. Such rumours were credible and rapidly spread. American broadcaster William Shirer recorded large numbers of burns victims in Berlin; though it is not clear what he personally saw, it seems likely his reports were influenced by rumours. The interrogation of a Luftwaffe pilot revealed the existence of such weapons was common knowledge, and documents found after the war showed the German high command were deceived. The rumour seemed to take on a life of its own on both sides leading to persistent stories of a thwarted German invasion, in spite of official British denials. On 15 December 1940, The New York Times ran a story claiming that tens of thousands of German troops had been 'consumed by fire' in two failed invasion attempts.

== Planned resistance ==
The War Office did not treat the threat of invasion seriously until the collapse of France in May 1940. The Secret Intelligence Service had, however, been making plans for this eventuality since February 1940, creating the core of a secret resistance network across the country. This remained in existence until at least 1943 and comprised both intelligence and sabotage units. In May 1940, Section D also began to distribute arms dumps and recruit for a larger civilian guerrilla organisation called the Home Defence Scheme. This was deeply resented by the War Office who tasked MI(R) to create the Auxiliary Units as a military alternative.

Auxiliary Units were a specially trained and secret organisation that would act as uniformed commandos to attack the flanks and rear of an enemy advance. They were organised around a core of regular army 'scout sections', supported by patrols of 6–8 men recruited from the Home Guard. Although approval for the organisation had been given in June 1940, recruiting only began in early July. Each patrol was a self-contained cell, expected to be self-sufficient. There was, however, no means of communicating with them once they had gone to ground, which greatly reduced their strategic value. Each patrol was well-equipped and was provided with a concealed underground operational base, usually built in woodland and camouflaged. Auxiliary Units were only expected to operate during an organised military campaign, with an expected lifespan of 14 days. They were not, therefore, intended to operate as a long term resistance organisation. The latter was the responsibility of the Secret Intelligence Service Section VII, which would have only begun to expand its operations once the country had actually been occupied, thus confining knowledge of its existence only to those men and women who would have been available at the time.

In addition, the Auxiliary Units included a network of civilian Special Duties personnel, recruited to provide a short-term intelligence gathering service, spying on enemy formations and troop movements. Reports were to be collected from dead letter drops and, from 1941, relayed by civilian radio operators from secret locations. The wireless network only become operational from 1941 and was unlikely to survive more than a few days following invasion. Intelligence gathering after this period would be by the mobile patrols of the GHQ Liaison Unit ('Phantom'), which were staffed by skilled linguists and equipped with powerful wireless sets for direct communication with GHQ.

== Offensive anti-invasion operations ==
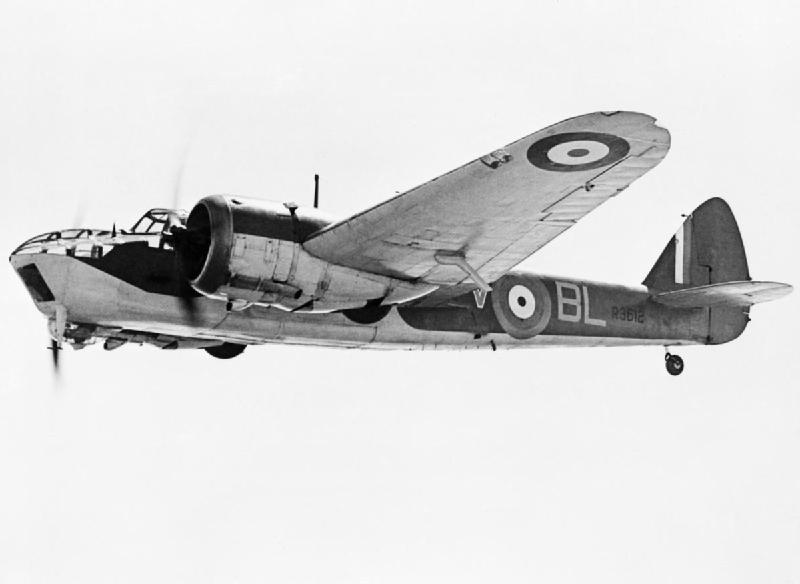
This Blenheim Mark VI bomber of No. 40 Squadron RAF was lost with its crew during a raid on German invasion barges at Ostend on 8 September 1940.

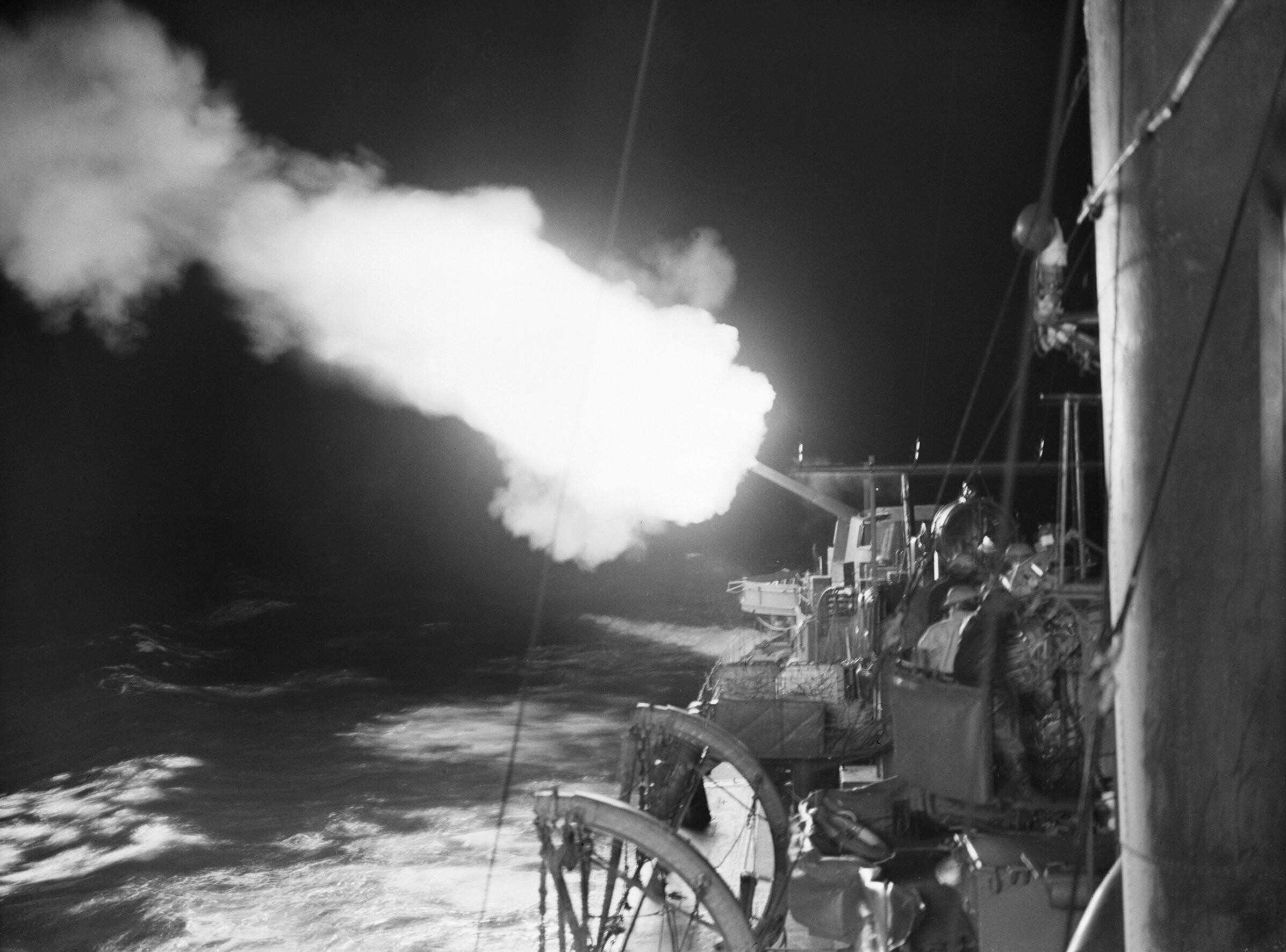
HMS Jupiter fires her 4.7-inch guns during Operation Medium, the bombardment of Cherbourg on 10 October 1940.

The War Cabinet and the Chiefs of Staff Committee were not content to sit and wait for the Germans to make the first move; considerable efforts were made to attack, by air and sea, the enemy shipping which had been assembled in occupied ports between The Hague and Cherbourg, starting in July 1940. These attacks became known as the "Battle of the Barges". Operations include:

- 12 August: Five Handley Page Hampdens attacked the Ladbergen Aqueduct on the Dortmund-Ems Canal. The waterway was blocked for ten days, impeding the movement of barges towards the Channel ports.
- 8 September: Two cruisers and ten destroyers swept along the French coast and bombarded Boulogne harbour. In a separate operation, three Motor Torpedo Boats attacked a convoy of small vessels off Ostend; two of the MTBs then entered the harbour and torpedoed two transport ships.
- 10 September: Three destroyers found a convoy of invasion transports off Ostend and sank an escort vessel, two trawlers that were towing barges and one large barge.
- 13 September: Three destroyers sent to bombard Ostend but the operation was cancelled due to bad weather. A further twelve destroyers swept parts of the French coast between Roches Douvres, Cherbourg, Boulogne and Cape Griz Nez. while an RAF bombing raid destroyed 80 barges at Ostend.
- 15 September: Sergeant John Hannah gained the Victoria Cross during a raid by RAF bombers on invasion barges at Antwerp; four transport ships were damaged.
- 17 September: A major attack by Bomber Command on ports along the occupied coast. 84 barges were damaged at Dunkirk.
- 26 September: Operation Lucid, a plan to send fire ships into the harbours at Calais and Boulogne to destroy invasion barges, was abandoned when War Nizam, one of the old tankers that were to be used, had engine failure and the other War Nawab was suffering so many leaks that she was unfit for sea.
- 30 September: The monitor HMS Erebus fired seventeen 15-inch shells onto Calais docks.
- 4 October: Second attempt at Operation Lucid, this time cancelled because of bad weather.
- 7 October: Third attempt at Lucid, cancelled when HMS Hambledon, the destroyer carrying the force commander, hit a mine and had to be towed home.
- 10–11 October: Operation Medium, the bombardment of invasion transports in Cherbourg. A concentrated RAF bombing raid during the night occupied the attention of German defences, allowing a Navy task force to approach to within gun range without detection. During the 18-minute bombardment, 120 15-inch shells were fired by the battleship HMS Revenge, and a total of 801 4.7-inch shells were fired by her escorting destroyers. German coastal artillery replied for 30 minutes without hitting any of the warships.

Between 15 July and 21 September, German sources stated that 21 transport vessels and 214 barges had been damaged by British air raids. These figures may have been under-reported.

== The threat recedes ==
Churchill was, at times, pessimistic about Britain's chances for victory, telling Hastings Ismay on 12 June 1940 that "[y]ou and I will be dead in three months' time". In mid-1940, an invasion attempt could have occurred at any time, but some times were more likely than others: The high tide, the phase of the moon and most of all, the weather were considerations. The weather usually deteriorates significantly after September, but an October landing was not out of the question. On 3 October, General Brooke wrote in his diary, "Still no invasion! I am beginning to think that the Germans may after all not attempt it. And yet! I have the horrid thought that he may still bring off some surprise on us".

The Battle of Britain had been won and on 12 October 1940, unknown to the British, Hitler rescheduled Sea Lion for early 1941. By then, the state of Britain's defences had much improved, with many more trained and equipped men becoming available and field fortifications reaching a high state of readiness. With national confidence rising, Prime Minister Churchill was able to say: "We are waiting for the long promised invasion. So are the fishes ..."

When Operation Barbarossa the German invasion of the Soviet Union, began on 22 June 1941, it came to be seen as unlikely that there would be any attempted landing as long as that conflict was undecided – from the British point of view, the matter hung in the balance. In July 1941, construction of field fortifications was greatly reduced and concentration given to the possibility of a raid in force rather than an invasion.

On 7 December 1941, a Japanese carrier fleet launched a surprise air attack on the American fleet at Pearl Harbor, leading to the United States entering the war on Britain's side. With America's Germany first strategy, resources flooded into Britain, ending the danger of invasion after two years. In 1944, the British Army retained an "abnormally large force of over 100,000 men for defence of the United Kingdom and other contingencies which could have been used in Normandy" claimed the American historian Carlo d'Este.

== Effectiveness ==
General Brooke frequently confided his concerns to his private diary. When published, he included additional annotations written many years later:

... I considered the invasion a very real and probable threat and one for which the land forces at my disposal fell far short of what I felt was required to provide any degree of real confidence in our power to defend these shores. It should not be construed that I considered our position a helpless one in the case of an invasion. Far from it. We should certainly have a desperate struggle and the future might well have hung in the balance, but I certainly felt that given a fair share of the fortunes of war we should certainly succeed in finally defending these shores. It must be remembered that if my diary occasionally gave vent to some of the doubts which the heavy responsibility generated, this diary was the one and only outlet for such doubts.

The question of whether the defences would have been effective in invasion is vexed. In mid-1940, the preparations relied heavily upon field fortifications. The First World War made it clear that assaulting prepared defences with infantry was deadly and difficult, but similar preparations in Belgium had been overrun by well-equipped German Panzer divisions in the early weeks of 1940 and with so many armaments left at Dunkirk, British forces were woefully ill-equipped to take on German armour. On the other hand, while British preparations for defence were ad hoc, so were the German invasion plans: a fleet of 2,000 converted barges and other vessels had been hurriedly made available and their fitness was debatable; in any case, the Germans could not land troops with all their heavy equipment. Until the Germans captured a port, both armies would have been short of tanks and heavy guns.

The later experiences of the Canadian Army during the disastrous Dieppe Raid of 1942, American forces on Omaha Beach on D-Day and taking on Japanese defenders on Pacific Islands showed that, under the right conditions, a defender could exact a terrible price from assaulting forces, significantly depleting and delaying enemy forces until reinforcements could be deployed to appropriate places via the sea and inland.

In the event of invasion, the Royal Navy would have sailed to the landing places, possibly taking several days. The German Kriegsmarine had, however, been severely depleted by the Norwegian campaign. It lost a heavy cruiser, a light cruiser, and almost a quarter of its destroyers; two heavy units, a Panzerschiff and a battlecruiser, were out of action due to torpedo damage. In late 1940, the Kriegsmarine was thus virtually bereft of heavy units to either provide gunfire support to a landing or to counter any intervention by the Royal Navy. It is now known that the Germans planned to land on the southern coast of England; one reason for this site was that the narrow seas of the English Channel could be blocked with mines, submarines and torpedo boats and thus prevent the Royal Navy from defending against an invasion. While German naval forces and the Luftwaffe could have extracted a high price from a defending Royal Navy, they could not have hoped to prevent interference with attempts to land a second wave of troops and supplies that would have been essential to German success – even if, by then, the Germans had captured a port essential for bringing in significant heavy equipment. In this scenario, British land forces would have faced the Germans on more equal terms than otherwise and it was only necessary to delay the German advance, preventing a collapse until the German land forces were, at least temporarily, isolated by the Royal Navy and then mounting a counterattack.

Scholarly consideration of the likely outcome of invasion, including the 1974 Royal Military Academy Sandhurst war game, agree that while German forces would have been able to land and gain a significant beachhead, intervention of the Royal Navy would have been decisive and, even with the most optimistic assumptions, the German army would not have penetrated further than GHQ Line and would have been defeated.

Following the failure to gain even local air superiority in the Battle of Britain, Operation Sea Lion was postponed indefinitely. Hitler and his generals were aware of the problems of an invasion. Hitler was not ideologically committed to a long war with Britain and many commentators suggest that German invasion plans were a feint never to be put into action.

While Britain may have been militarily secure in 1940, both sides were aware of the possibility of a political collapse. If the Germans had won the Battle of Britain, the Luftwaffe would have been able to strike anywhere in southern England and with the prospect of an invasion, the British government would have come under pressure to come to terms: the extensive anti-invasion preparations demonstrated to Germany and to the people of Britain that whatever happened in the air, the United Kingdom was both able and willing to defend itself.

== See also ==
- British pet massacre
- Coats Mission
- Eastbourne Redoubt, home of the Combined Service Museum
- Dymchurch Redoubt
- Operation Lucid
- Atlantic Wall
- British County Divisions, regular infantry divisions raised for static and coastal defence duties
